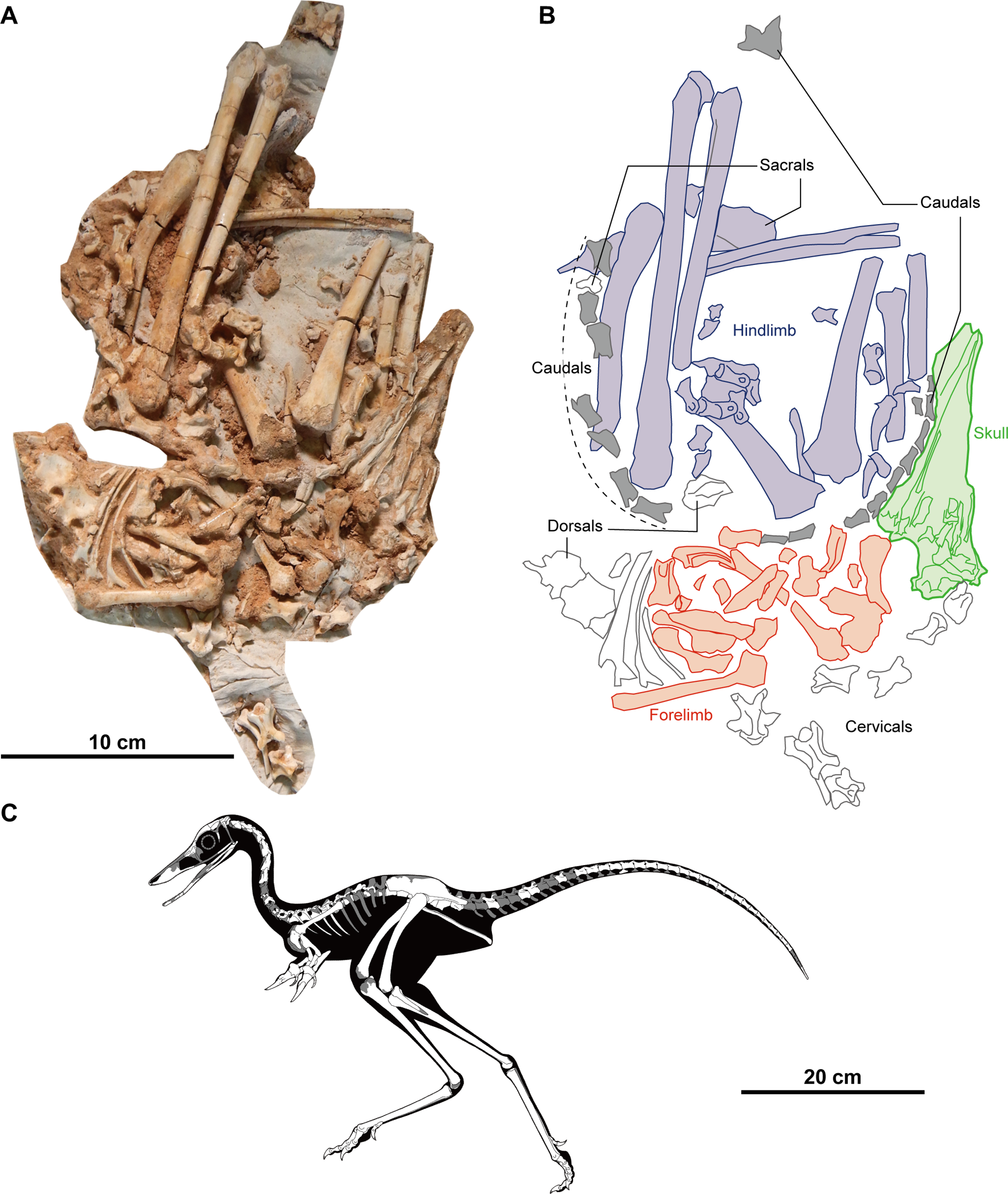
- Holotype specimen and skeletal reconstruction

Scientific classification
- Kingdom: Animalia
- Phylum: Chordata
- Class: Reptilia
- Clade: Dinosauria
- Clade: Saurischia
- Clade: Theropoda
- Family: †Alvarezsauridae
- Subfamily: †Parvicursorinae
- Genus: †Jaculinykus
- Species: †J. yaruui

Binomial name
- †Jaculinykus yaruui Kubo et al., 2023

= Jaculinykus =

Jaculinykus Temporal range: Late Cretaceous, 72–71 Ma

Genus of alvarezsaurid dinosaurs

Jaculinykus (meaning "Jaculus claw") is an extinct genus of alvarezsaurid theropod dinosaur from the Late Cretaceous Baruungoyot Formation of Mongolia. The genus contains a single species, J. yaruui, known from a nearly complete articulated skeleton including bones of the skull. Jaculinykus is notable for its unique hand, which has a hypertrophied first digit and greatly reduced second digit, which is intermediate between the tridactyl hand of Shuvuuia and monodactyl hand of Linhenykus.

== Discovery and naming ==
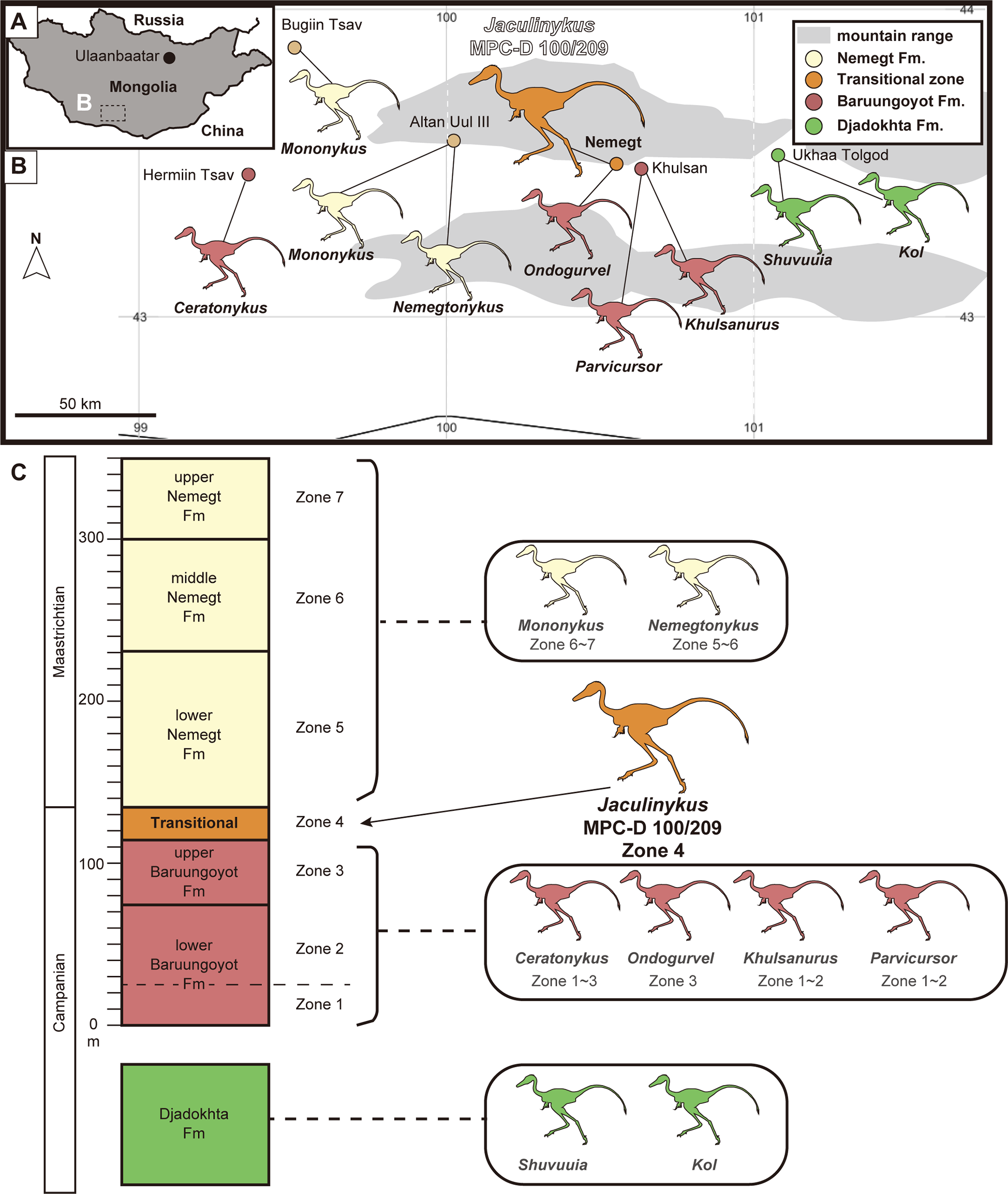
Occurrence of alvarezsaurids in Mongolia (Jaculinykus at center, zone 4)

The Jaculinykus holotype specimen, MPC-D 100/209, was discovered in sediments of the Baruungoyot Formation (Nemegt locality), of Ömnögovi Province, Mongolia. The specimen consists of a nearly complete skeleton with most of the skull.

In 2023, Kubo et al. described Jaculinykus yaruui as a new genus and species of parvicursorine alvarezsaurid based on these fossil remains. The generic name, "Jaculinykus", combines a reference to the Jaculus, a small dragon in Greek mythology with the Greek word "onykus," meaning "claw". The specific name "yaruui" is derived from "yaruu" ("яаруу"), the Mongolian word for "speedy" or "hasty".

== Classification ==
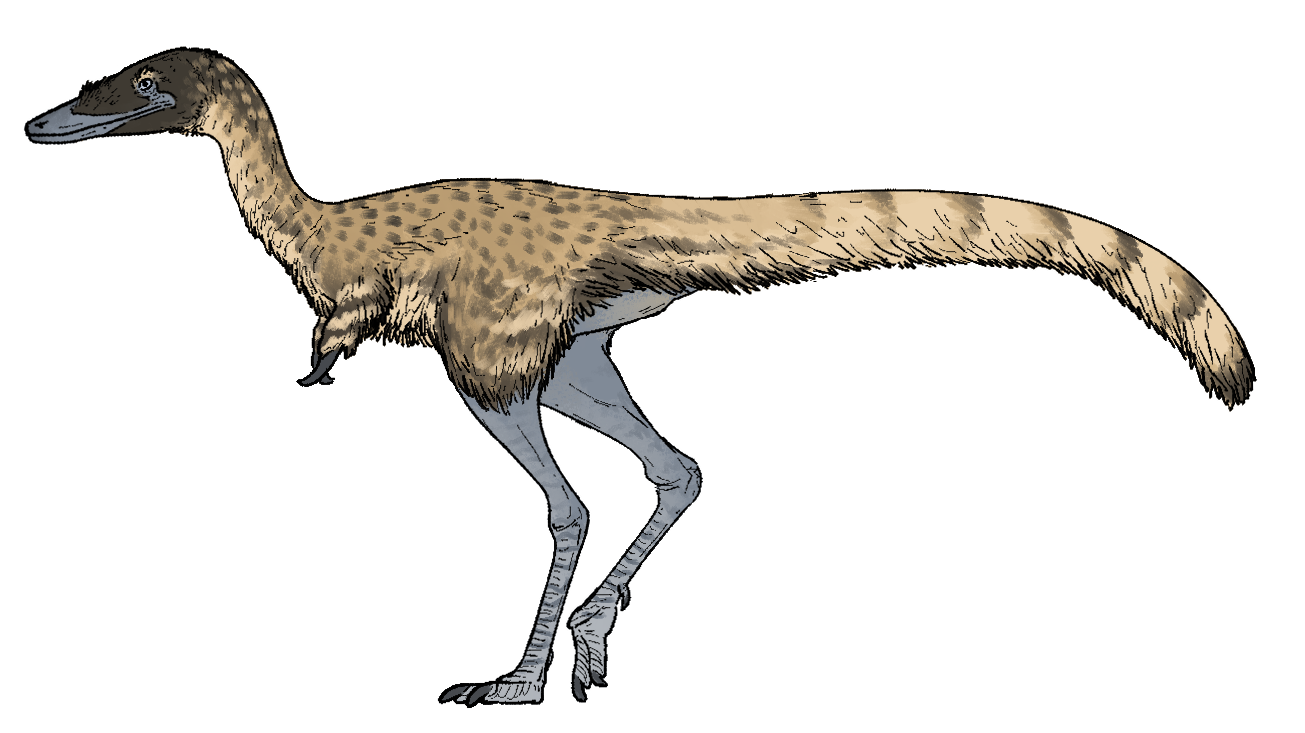
Life restoration

Jaculinykus was added to a phylogenetic analysis and found to be in the clade Parvicursorinae, in a clade consisting of all alvarezsaurs from the Nemegt Basin. The cladogram from Kubo et al. (2023) is shown below:

- Alvarezsauria
  - Aorun
  - - Haplocheirus
    - - - Xiyunykus
        - Tugulusaurus
      - - Bannykus
        - - Patagonykus
          - - Achillesaurus
            - Alvarezsauridae
              - Alvarezsaurus
              - - Albertonykus
                - - Qiupanykus
                  - - Nemegtonykus
                    - Parvicursorinae
                      - Dzharaonyx
                      - Khulsanurus
                      - - Linhenykus
                        - - Parvicursor
                          - Ceratonykus
                      - - - Xixianykus
                          - Albinykus
                          - Ondogurvel
                        - - Mononykus
                          - - Jaculinykus
                            - Shuvuuia

== Paleoecology ==
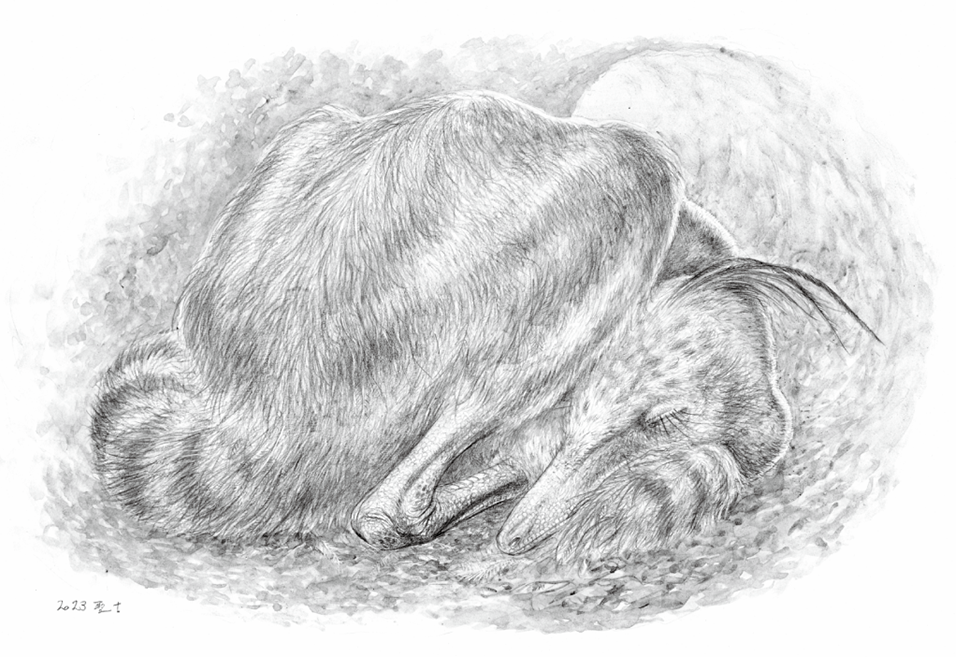
Restoration of the sleeping posture

Fossils of Ondogurvel, another parvicursorine alvarezsaurid, as well as fossils of Nemegtomaia, an oviraptorosaur, are also known from the Nemegt locality of the Mongolian Barun Goyot Formation. Other localities from the formation have yielded dinosaurs including additional alvarezsaurids (Ceratonykus, Khulsanurus, and Parvicursor), as well as dromaeosaurs (Hulsanpes, Kuru, and Shri devi), oviraptorosaurs (Conchoraptor and Heyuannia), a sauropod (Quaesitosaurus), ceratopsians (Bagaceratops and Breviceratops), a pachycephalosaur (Tylocephale), and ankylosaurs (Saichania, Tarchia, and Zaraapelta).
