= Trierarchuncus =

Trierarchuncus Temporal range: Late Cretaceous, 66.2–66 Ma
- Thumb claws of Trierarchuncus prairiensis

Scientific classification
- Kingdom: Animalia
- Phylum: Chordata
- Class: Reptilia
- Clade: Dinosauria
- Clade: Saurischia
- Clade: Theropoda
- Family: †Alvarezsauridae
- Subfamily: †Parvicursorinae
- Genus: †Trierarchuncus; Fowler et al., 2020
- Species: †T. prairiensis

Binomial name
- †Trierarchuncus prairiensis Fowler et al., 2020

Extinct genus of reptiles

Trierarchuncus (meaning "captain hook," after its single-clawed hands) is a monotypic genus of alvarezsaurid theropod which includes a single species, Trierarchuncus prairiensis, mainly known from fossils found in deposits of the Hell Creek Formation in Montana. It is the youngest known alvarezsaurid and one of the last non-avian dinosaurs, going extinct during the Cretaceous–Paleogene extinction event, which occurred approximately 66 million years ago.

== Discovery and naming ==
Hand claw 1 of Trierarchuncus prairiensis holotype MOR 6622

Hand claw 1 of Trierarchuncus prairiensis BDM 001, most complete known specimen

Trierarchuncus prairiensis model by Boban Filipović at Badlands Dinosaur Museum, Dickinson, ND

The first remains were discovered in Montana in 1980 and it was informally named as the "Hell Creek alvarezsaur" by Hutchinson and Chiappe (1998). The then unnamed species was not mentioned again until it was mentioned briefly in the 2018 Society of Vertebrate Paleontology abstract book. The species and genus were scientifically described by Denver Fowler and colleagues in 2020 based on three claw phalanges from MD-I-2, including the holotype MOR 6622, the distal end of a radius and fragmentary metatarsal.

The first part of the generic name, Trierarch, means "triarch" (the title of captain of the trireme in classical Greece), while the second, uncus, is translated from Latin as "hook"; it can thus be translated as "captain hook", although its describers do not explicitly make the connection with the Peter Pan character. The specific name means "from the prairie" and refers to the plains of eastern Montana where the remains were discovered.

New manual unguals from individuals of different maturity from the Hell Creek Formation were referred to this taxon by Freimuth & Wilson (2021). Potential specimens identified as cf. T. prairiensis (YPM VP 56916, YPM VP 57236 and YPM VP 57402) have been recovered from the Lance Formation in Wyoming.

== Description ==
Trierarchuncus was described by Fowler and colleagues based upon several differences, especially on the three phalanges, the radius and the metatarsals. Trierarchuncus is known from its arms, feet and toes. Like its relatives, Trierarchuncus would have been feathered, with short arms bearing one clawed digit, a bird-like head and long legs. Ontogenetic change based on unguals of different maturity indicate allometric growth.

== Classification ==
Cladogram according to Fowler et al., 2020, with clade names added by definition:

- Alvarezsauroidea
  - Aorun
  - - Haplocheirus
    - - - Tugulusaurus
        - Xiyunykus
      - - Bannykus
        - - Bonapartenykus
          - - Patagonykus
            - - Achillesaurus
              - Alvarezsauridae
                - Alvarezsaurus
                - - Albertonykus
                  - Parvicursorinae
                    - Shuvuuia
                    - Ceratonykus
                    - Kol
                    - Linhenykus
                    - Mononykus
                    - Trierarchuncus
                    - Parvicursor
                    - Albinykus
                    - Xixianykus

== Paleoecology ==
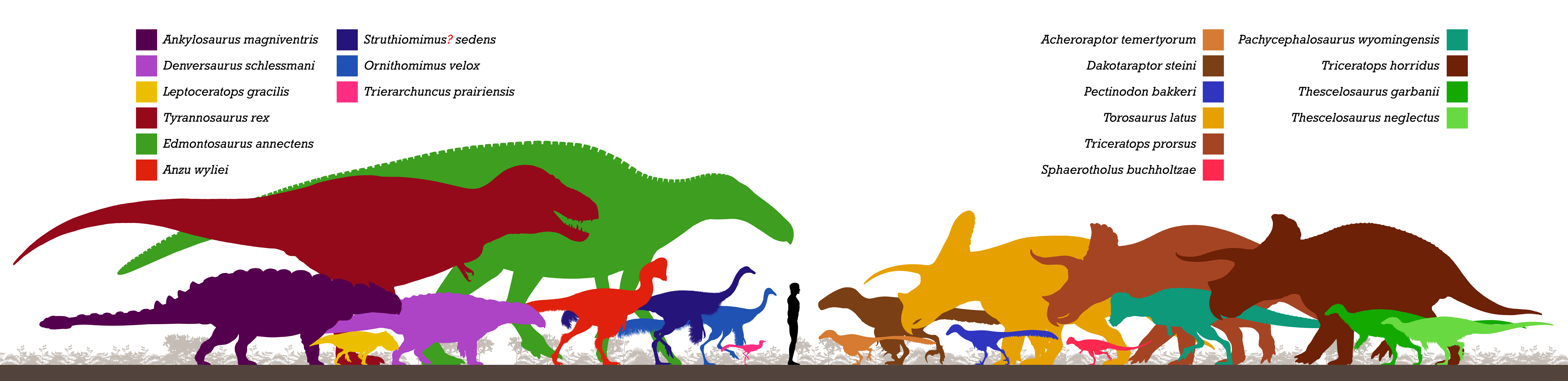
Hell Creek fauna; Trierarchuncus in light pink

Trierarchuncus represents one of the few known alvarezsaurids from North America. At 66 million years old, it is the youngest known alvarezsaurid and is one of the youngest non-avian dinosaurs in general, like its contemporaries Tyrannosaurus and Triceratops. Additionally, another Hell Creek alvarezsaurid, called "Ornithomimus" minutus, is known, but Fowler et al. did not refer it to Trierarchuncus.
