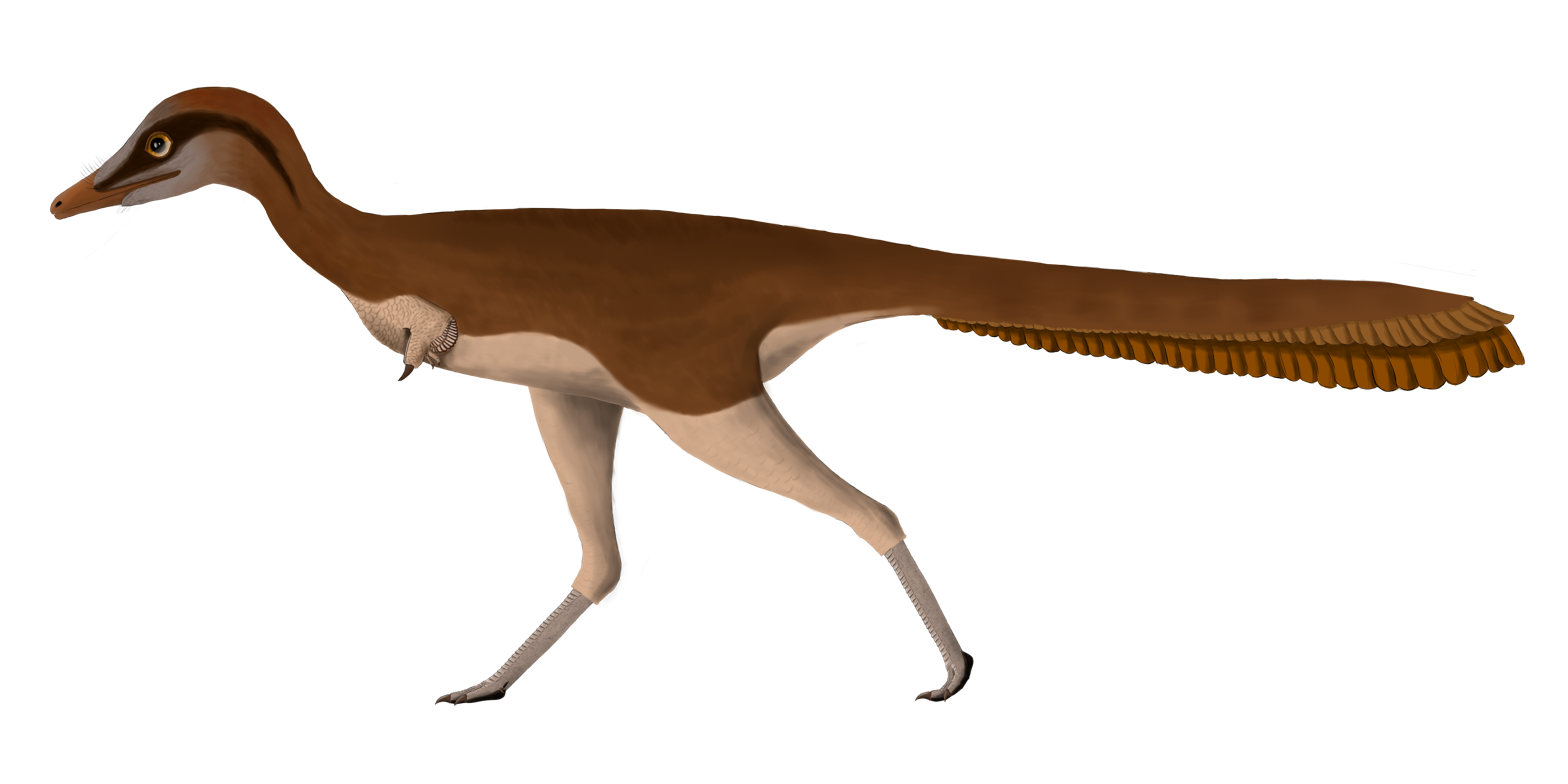
- Life reconstruction of O. alifanovi

Scientific classification
- Kingdom: Animalia
- Phylum: Chordata
- Class: Reptilia
- Clade: Dinosauria
- Clade: Saurischia
- Clade: Theropoda
- Family: †Alvarezsauridae
- Subfamily: †Parvicursorinae
- Genus: †Ondogurvel; Averianov & Lopatin, 2022
- Species: †O. alifanovi

Binomial name
- †Ondogurvel alifanovi Averianov & Lopatin, 2022

= Ondogurvel =

Ondogurvel Temporal range: Late Cretaceous, (Campanian), 72.1 Ma

Genus of alvarezsaurid dinosaur

Ondogurvel (meaning "egg lizard") is a genus of alvarezsaurid dinosaur from the Late Cretaceous (Campanian) Barun Goyot Formation in southern Mongolia. The type and only species is O. alifanovi, known from a partial skeleton consisting of fragments of two last dorsal vertebrae, three anterior sacral vertebrae, right ilium, left and right pubis and ischium, articulated right tibia, fibula, metatarsals II and IV, and phalanges IV-1 and IV-2, right carpometacarpus, left and right manual phalanx II-1, right femur, left pedal phalanx II-1, and fragments of unidentified phalanges.

== Discovery and naming ==
In 2022, the type species Ondogurvel alifanovi was named and described by Alexander O. Averianov and Alexey V. Lopatin. The generic name, "Ondogurvel" combines the Mongolian words өндөг ondo "egg" and гүрвэл gurvel "lizard". The specific name, "alifanovi" honors the late Russian paleontologist Vladimir Alifanov who found the holotype specimen (PIN 5838/1) in 1999.

== Description ==
Ondogurvel was a bipedal theropod. Like other parvicursorines, it had a robust humerus, and long hindlimbs suggesting a cusorial lifestyle. It is unique in that, unlike all other alvarezsaurids, it has metartarsals II and IV completely fused along their contact area.

The following differences from the Parvicursor, another parvicursorine from the Barun Goyot Formation, were identified by Averianov & Lopatin (2022):

- dorsally arcuate supraacetabular crest of the ilium;
- the tibia less curved labially in transverse plane;
- relatively shorter pedal phalanx II-1.

On the other hand, describers noted that the femora of Ondogurvel and Parvicursor are almost identical. Mickey Mortimer has suggested that Ondogurvel may be a junior synonym of Parvicursor, which is known only from a juvenile individual.

== Classification ==
Averianov and Lopatin (2022) place Ondogurvel in the alvarezsaurid subfamily Parvicursorinae which are classified by their manus morphology. They recovered that Ondogurvel formed a clade with Xixianykus and Albinykus which have proximally co-ossified metatarsals II and IV. The describing paper also proposes that the "drastic difference in the morphology of the carpometacarpus [across Parvicursorinae] may suggest a deep divergence between the parvicursorine lineages represented by [Dzharaonyx] – Linhenykus and Mononykus – Ondogurvel".

Phylogeny after Averianov & Lopatin (2022):

- Alvarezsauridae
  - Alvarezsaurus
  - - Achillesaurus
    - - Albertonykus
      - - - Qiupanykus
          - Nemegtonykus
        - Parvicursorinae
          - - Linhenykus
            - - Ceratonykus
              - Parvicursor
          - - - Mononykus
              - Shuvuuia
            - - Xixianykus
              - - Albinykus
                - Ondogurvel

== Paleoecology ==
Nemegtomaia, an oviraptorosaur, is also known from the Nemegt locality of the Mongolian Barun Goyot Formation. Other localities from the formation have yielded dinosaurs including other alvarezsaurids (Ceratonykus, Khulsanurus, and Parvicursor), as well as dromaeosaurs (Hulsanpes, Kuru, and Shri devi), oviraptorosaurs (Conchoraptor and Heyuannia), a sauropod (Quaesitosaurus), ceratopsians (Bagaceratops and Breviceratops), a pachycephalosaur (Tylocephale), and ankylosaurs (Saichania, Tarchia, and Zaraapelta).
