= Khulsanurus =

Khulsanurus Temporal range: Late Cretaceous, Campanian

Scientific classification
- Kingdom: Animalia
- Phylum: Chordata
- Class: Reptilia
- Clade: Dinosauria
- Clade: Saurischia
- Clade: Theropoda
- Family: †Alvarezsauridae
- Subfamily: †Parvicursorinae
- Genus: †Khulsanurus; Averianov & Lopatin, 2022

Type species
- †Khulsanurus magnificus Averianov & Lopatin, 2022

Extinct genus of dinosaurs

Khulsanurus (meaning "tail from Khulsan") is an extinct genus of alvarezsaurid theropod dinosaur from the Late Cretaceous Baruungoyot Formation of the Khulsan Locality in the Gobi Desert region of Mongolia. The type and only species is Khulsanurus magnificus.

== Description ==
Khulsanurus is known from a holotype containing partial vertebral series of the neck and tail, scapulocoracoids, a right humerus, a possible left humerus, and a left pubis. Distinguishing autapomorphies of this specimen include pleurocoel-, carotid process-, and epipophysis-less cervical vertebrae, prominent infrapostzygapophyseal fossa of the caudal vertebrae which also bear anteriorly pointing prezygapophyses.

== Classification ==
Averianov & Lopatin (2021) placed Khulsanurus in a polytomy with Albinykus, Ceratonykus, Linhenykus, Parvicursor, Xixianykus, Qiupanykus, Nemegtonykus, PIN 5838/1 (=Ondogurvel) and a clade containing Shuvuuia and Mononykus in a strict consensus tree using unweighted characters. However, Averianov & Lopatin (2021) also recovered it in a polytomy with only Albinykus, Xixianykus, PIN 5838/1 (=Ondogurvel), Mononykus and Shuvuuia in a consensus tree using implied weighting. Averianov & Sues (2022) conducted a phylogenetic analysis using implied weighting which recovered it in a similar position but with inclusion of a clade containing Linhenykus, Ceratonykus and Parvicuror and the exclusion of Qiupanykus and Nemegtonykus, while a 50% majority rule tree from the same analysis placed it within a polytomy with two clades.

A phylogenetic analysis conducted by Averianov & Sues (2022) is reproduced below.

- Alvarezsauridae
  - Alvarezsaurus
  - - Achillesaurus
    - - Albertonykus
      - - - Qiupanykus
          - Nemegtonykus
        - Parvicursorinae
          - Albinykus
          - Xixianykus
          - PIN 5838/1 (=Ondogurvel)
          - Khulsanurus
          - Dzharaonyx
          - - Mononykus
            - Shuvuuia
          - - Linhenykus
            - - Ceratonykus
              - Parvicursor

== Paleoenvironment ==
Khulsanurus was found in the Campanian Barun Goyot Formation, which was also home to many other animals, including mammals such as Catopsbaatar and Nemegtbaatar, squamates such as Estesia, Gobiderma, and Proplatynotia, and numerous dinosaurs, including ornithischians such as Saichania, Tarchia, Zaraapelta, Tylocephale, Bagaceratops, Breviceratops, and Udanoceratops; sauropods such as Quaesitosaurus; and theropods, including Conchoraptor, Heyuannia, Nemegtomaia, Hulsanpes, Kuru, Shri devi, Ceratonykus, Ondogurvel, Parvicursor, Gobipteryx, and Hollanda.
