= Manipulonyx =

Manipulonyx Temporal range: Late Cretaceous, Maastrichtian
- Reconstructed skeleton

Scientific classification
- Kingdom: Animalia
- Phylum: Chordata
- Class: Reptilia
- Clade: Dinosauria
- Clade: Saurischia
- Clade: Theropoda
- Family: †Alvarezsauridae
- Subfamily: †Parvicursorinae
- Genus: †Manipulonyx; Averianov, Lopatin & Atuchin, 2025
- Species: †M. reshetovi

Binomial name
- †Manipulonyx reshetovi Averianov, Lopatin & Atuchin, 2025

Genus of alvarezsaurid dinosaurs

Manipulonyx is an extinct genus of alvarezsaurid theropod dinosaurs known from the Late Cretaceous (Maastrichtian age) Nemegt Formation of Mongolia. The genus contains a single species, Manipulonyx reshetovi, known from a partial skeleton. This includes the most complete forelimb known from any member of the alvarezsaurid subfamily Parvicursorinae, including all of the proximal carpal bones. Like other alvarezsaurids, Manipulonyx bears an enlarged claw on the functionally-monodactyl hand, though it also has unique ossified spikes on the wrists. These have been interprested as adaptations for ovivory (egg-eating) with the small spikes used to help the animal grasp eggs, and the large claw used to puncture the egg before consumption.

== Discovery and naming ==
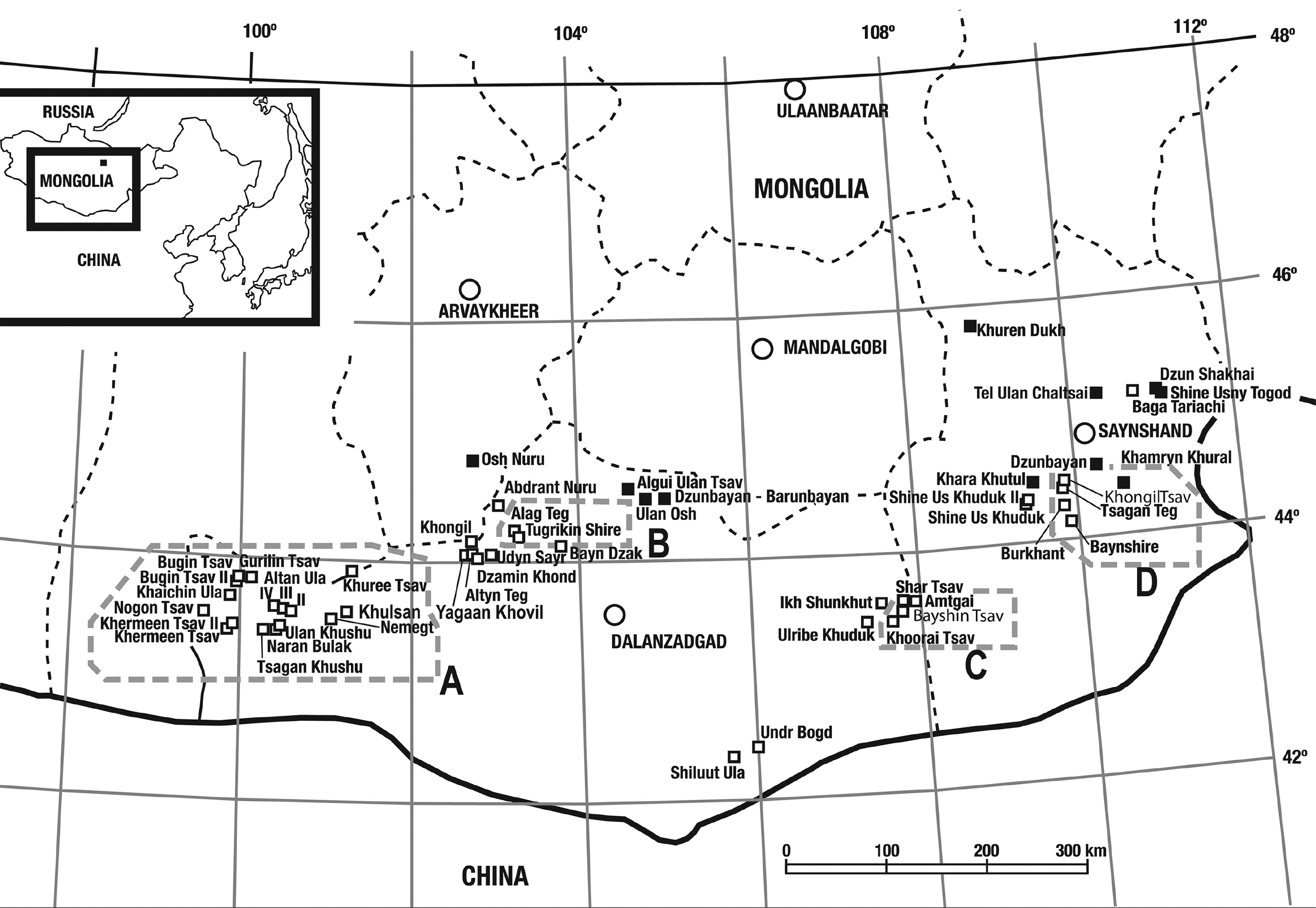
Mongolian Cretaceous fossil localities; Manipulonyx is known from the Khermeen Tsav locality in Area A (Nemegt Formation)

The Manipulonyx fossil material was discovered in 1979 by V. Yu. Reshetov in an outcrop of the Nemegt Formation ('Khermeen Tsav' locality, also spelled 'Hermiin Tsav') in the Gobi Desert of Mongolia. The specimen is housed in the Paleontological Institute of the Russian Academy of Sciences, where it is permanently accessioned as specimen PIN 3142/364. The specimen consists of several vertebrae (two cervicals, one dorsal, five sacrals, and five caudals), the left scapulocoracoid, much of both forelimbs, a partial pelvic girdle, and fragments from both hindlimbs.

In 2025, Alexander O. Averianov, Alexey V. Lopatin, and Andrey Atuchin described Manipulonyx reshetovi as a new genus and species of alvarezsaurid theropod based on these fossil remains, establishing PIN 3142/364 as the holotype specimen. The generic name, Manipulonyx, combines the Latin word manipulare, meaning 'to manipulate' or 'to handle', with the Greek word ὄνυξ (onyx), meaning 'claw'. The specific name, reshetovi, honors V. Y. Reshetov, the discoverer of the holotype.

== Description ==
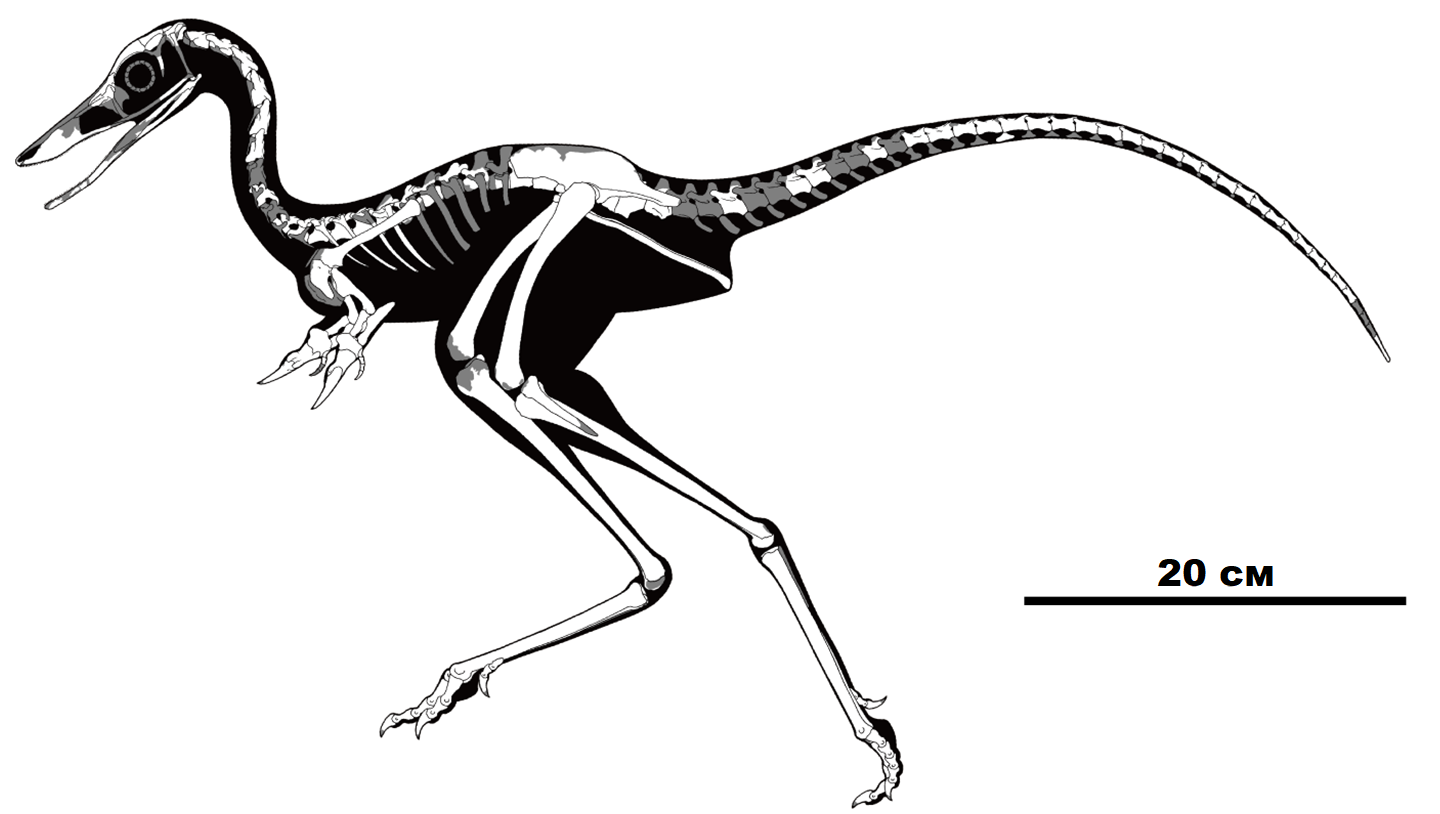
Reconstructed skeleton of Jaculinykus, a typical parvicursorine

As a parvicursorine, Manipulonyx would have been a small theropod with distinctive short forelimbs, comprising a robust humerus and functionally monodactyl (one-fingered) hand with a greatly enlarged ungual (claw). The hindlimbs are slender and elongated, likely an indicator of cursorial (running) behavior.

The forelimb of Manipulonyx is especially notable, as it is the most completely known of any parvicursorine. The proximal and distal (upper and lower) ends of the left humerus, as well as the distal end of the right humerus, are preserved. The radius and ulna are co-ossified (fused together), with a suture still visible separating the two. The olecranon process of the ulna is missing. Three carpals are preserved, the ulnare, intermedium, and radiale, articulating with the radius and ulna. The carpals are followed by the metacarpus, comprising three completely fused metacarpals. This forms a large, complex element with which several other bones articulate. Manipulonyx has three manual digits (fingers), two of which are greatly reduced and the third of which is extremely large. A claw was present on each digit, with the enlarged second digit (Note: The authors follow the "Frame Shift Hypothesis", which posits that the second finger in maniraptorans has the same structure as the first finger of basal theropods. The alternative hypothesis is that no frame shift occurred, and the finger indicated here as the second is instead the first.) exhibiting an especially large, curved morphology. In addition to the digits, three small, conical spikes are preserved around the metacarpus, facing forward, backward, and inward. While Manipulonyx is the first alvarezsaurid found with these spikes, other species likely had them based on articular surfaces observed on their metacarpi. Like the claws, these spikes were likely covered in a keratinous sheath, increasing their size.

=== Paleobiology ===
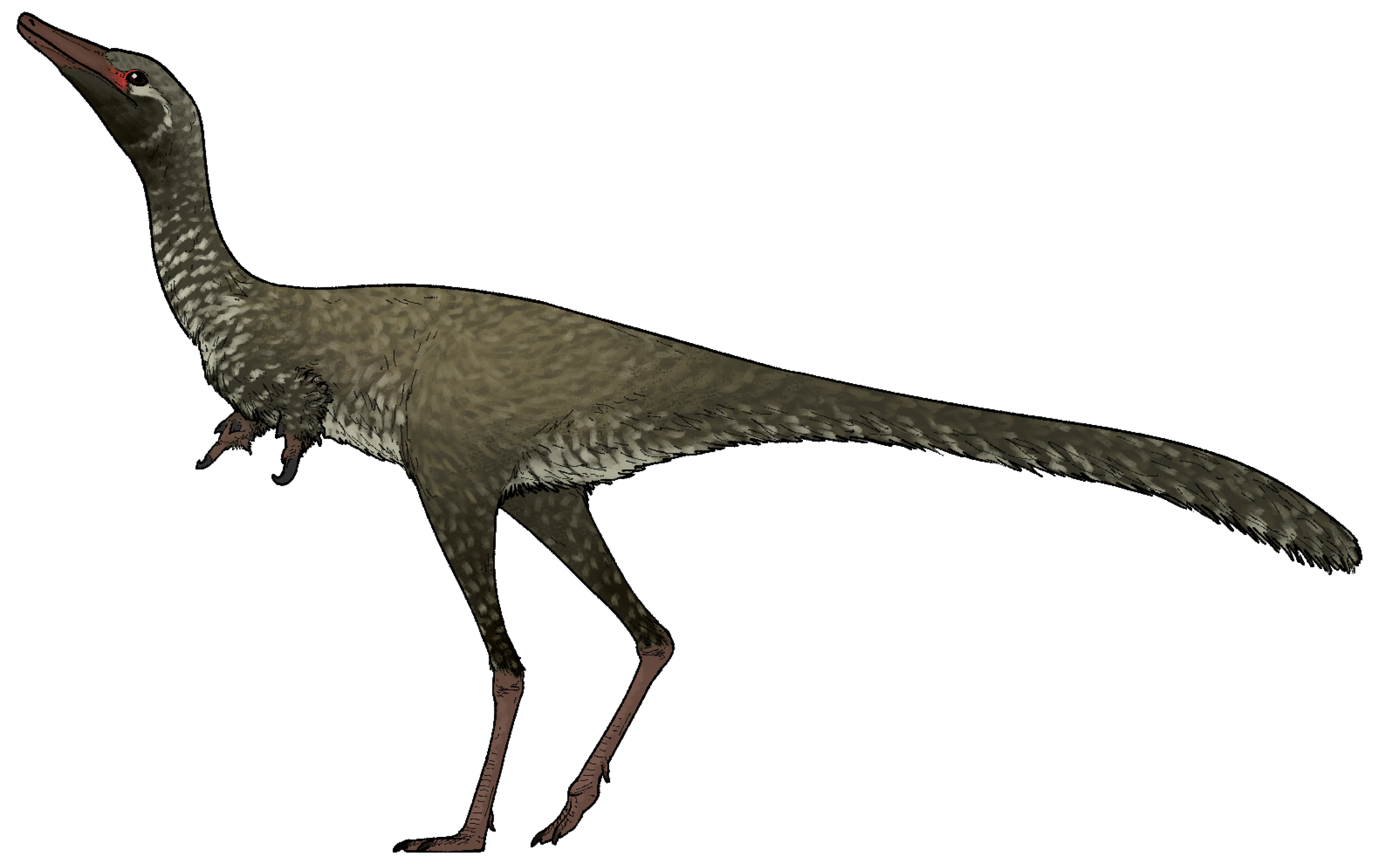
Life restoration

The distinctive hand and forelimb of Manipulonyx raises questions about the behavior and ecology of this taxon and other alvarezsaurids, a point debated by previous researchers. Several authors have interpreted alvarezsaurids as myrmecophagous animals, using their hypertrophied claws in a 'hook-and-pull' fashion to access the nests of ants and termites, similar to modern anteaters. In their 2025 description of Manipulonx, Averianov and colleagues disputed this hypothesis, noting that, due to the extreme size discrepancy between the arms and legs of alvarezsaurids, they would have been unable to conveniently reach the ground. Their cursorial-adapted hindlimbs are also inconsistent with fossorial (digging) habits, and their shortened forelimbs would not have been efficient for digging.

In their 2018 description of the alvarezsaurid Qiupanykus, Lü and colleagues proposed these animals were ovivorous based on the discovery of the specimen of this genus in association with oviraptorid eggshells. They suggested alvarezsaurids used their robust claws to break eggshells to be able to consume the egg's contents. Averianov et al. (2025) elaborated on this hypothesis based on the well-preserved forelimb of Manipulonyx. The region of the pectoral girdle where the humerus articulates is oriented posterolaterally (back and to the side), allowing both arms to more effectively grasp relatively large objects, such as an egg. A pronounced keeled sternum in parvicursorines indicates a stronger pectoralis muscle, improving their grasping abilities. The carpometacarpal spikes and vestigial fingers would have been used to support the egg, while the enlarged second claw would puncture the shell. Based on previous research suggesting nocturnal habits for the parvicursorine Shuvuuia, Averianov et al. concluded parvicursorines like Manipulonyx would have located dinosaur nests in the night, grabbed a single egg, and run away with it to a safe location before consumption. The optimal egg size to be grasped by an alvarezsaurid would be near the animal's body size.

The theory of nest-invading parvicursorines may explain the discovery of several members of this clade in association with dinosaur eggshells, including Manipulonyx, Qiupanykus, and the more distantly-related Bonapartenykus.

== Paleoenvironment ==
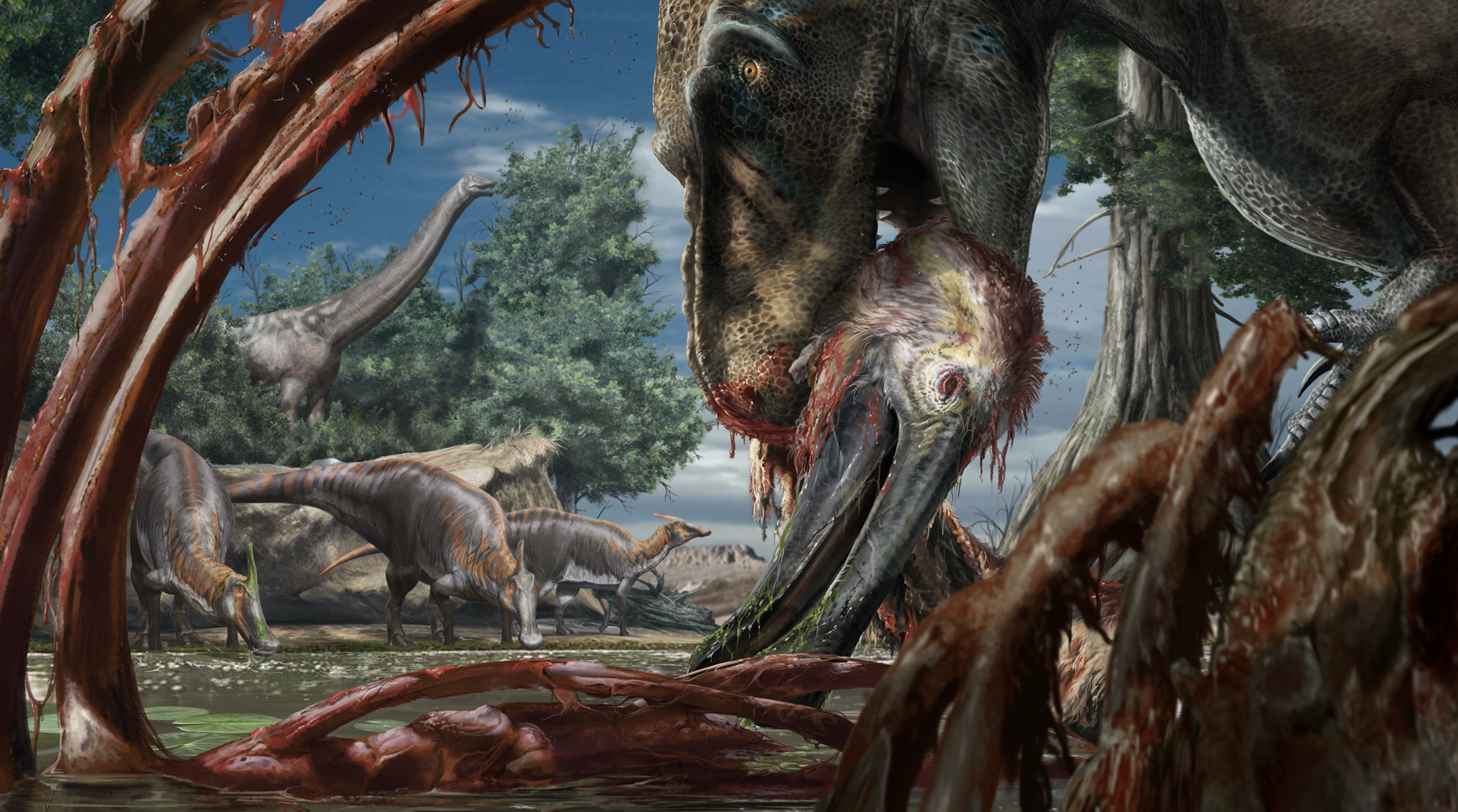
Restoration of the Nemegt Formation paleoenvironment, including a Tarbosaurus feeding on a Deinocheirus in the foreground, and the herbivorous Saurolophus and Nemegtosaurus in the background

Manipulonyx is known from the Nemegt Formation, which dates to the Maastrichtian age of the Late Cretaceous. It was found in the Khermeen Tsav locality, which has yielded the fossil remains of several other vertebrates, including diverse dinosaurs. Other theropods from this locality include the fellow alvarezsaurid Mononykus in addition to ornithomimids (Anserimimus and Gallimimus), the caenagnathid Elmisaurus, the therizinosaur Therizinosaurus, and the tyrannosaurid Tarbosaurus. Herbivorous dinosaurs include the titanosaurian sauropod Nemegtosaurus, ankylosaurids (Tarchia spp. and Zaraapelta), and the ornithopod Saurolophus angustirostris. Crocodylomorphs and several turtles (including Gobiapalone, Gravemys, and Mongolochelys) are also known.
