= Jaculus =

Mythological serpent

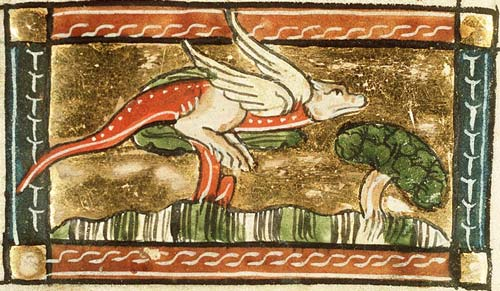

The jaculus (or iaculus, pl. jaculi, meaning "thrown" in Latin) is a small mythical serpent or dragon. It can be shown with wings and sometimes has front legs. It is also sometimes known as the javelin snake.

== In Greek mythology ==
It was said that the jaculus hid in the trees and sprang out at its victims. The force of it launching itself at the victim led to the association with javelins. Pliny described it as follows: "The jaculus darts from the branches of trees; and it is not only to our feet that the serpent is formidable, for these fly through the air even, just as though they were hurled from an engine."

Lucan also describes the attack of the jaculus in the Pharsalia. He explains that it is the wound caused by the jaculus hitting the victim that causes death. The jaculus does not kill with venom.

This is similar to Malagasy folklore concerning the fandrefiala, identified with Ithycyphus miniatus, a small snake with v-shaped markings on its head resembling a speartip. After carefully plotting its trajectory with the aid of thrown leaves, the fandrefiala is said to hurl itself at potential victims with enough force to break a metal pot; the impact of this collision inevitably proves fatal to both snake and target.

A jaculus is also found in the Old Norse romance Yngvars saga viðfǫrla. Here it is actually said to be an extremely large dragon (dreki). See Olson, Emil, ed. Yngvars saga viðfǫrla Jämte ett bihang om Ingvarsinskrifterna. Copenhagen: S. L. Møllers, 1912, p. 42.

The iaculus is described as a 'javelin-snake,' or a snake that flies from trees, in the medieval Aberdeen Bestiary.

== In the Renaissance ==
Leonardo da Vinci's notebooks mention an iaculus who leaps from trees and impales its victims: "Questa sta sopra le piante, e si lancia come dardo, e passa attraverso le fiere, e l’uccide.".

== In popular culture ==
- One of the units available in the 1999 turn-based strategy game Heroes of Might and Magic III from Fortress towns is the Jaculus-like Serpent Fly and its upgraded Dragon Fly form.
- Jaculi are briefly mentioned in Monsterology: The Complete Book of Fabulous Beasts, as Serpens volucer. Signs of the Jaculus are impaled prey, and pools of pink dung.
- In Yu-Gi-Oh!, the monster "Mecha Phantom Beast Jaculuslan" is partly based on a Jaculus.
- In the 2023 book Impossible Creatures by Katherine Rundell, the character Jacques is stated to be a small, tree-protecting Jaculus dragon.

== See also ==
- Chrysopelea — a genus of Southeast Asian flying snakes whose arboreal launching and gliding behavior resembles that attributed to the jaculus
- Jaculinykus — an alvarezsaurid theropod dinosaur genus named after the jaculus
- Hoop snake — a mythical creature known for rolling by grasping its tail in its mouth
