= Gregorio Álvarez (historian) =

Argentine historian, physician and writer

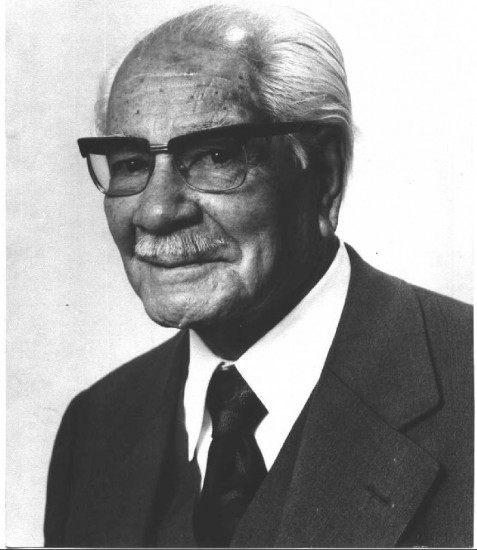
Gregorio Álvarez.

Gregorio Álvarez (28 November 1889, in Ranquilón, Ñorquín, Territory of Neuquén – 11 October 1986) was an Argentine historian, physician and writer.

== Biography ==
Álvarez became a teacher in 1910. In 1919, he graduated as a medical doctor at the University of Buenos Aires, specializing in dermatology. He was a founder of the Argentine Dermatological Association.

In 1950 he explored the Copahue hotsprings. He also made research on infantile eczema, obtaining the golden medal from Jammes Laboratories, Paris, in 1954.

Álvarez explored Neuquén Province on horseback, studying its culture.

The dinosaur genus Alvarezsaurus and the family Alvarezsauridae are named in his honour. He died on 11 October 1986 at the age of 96.
