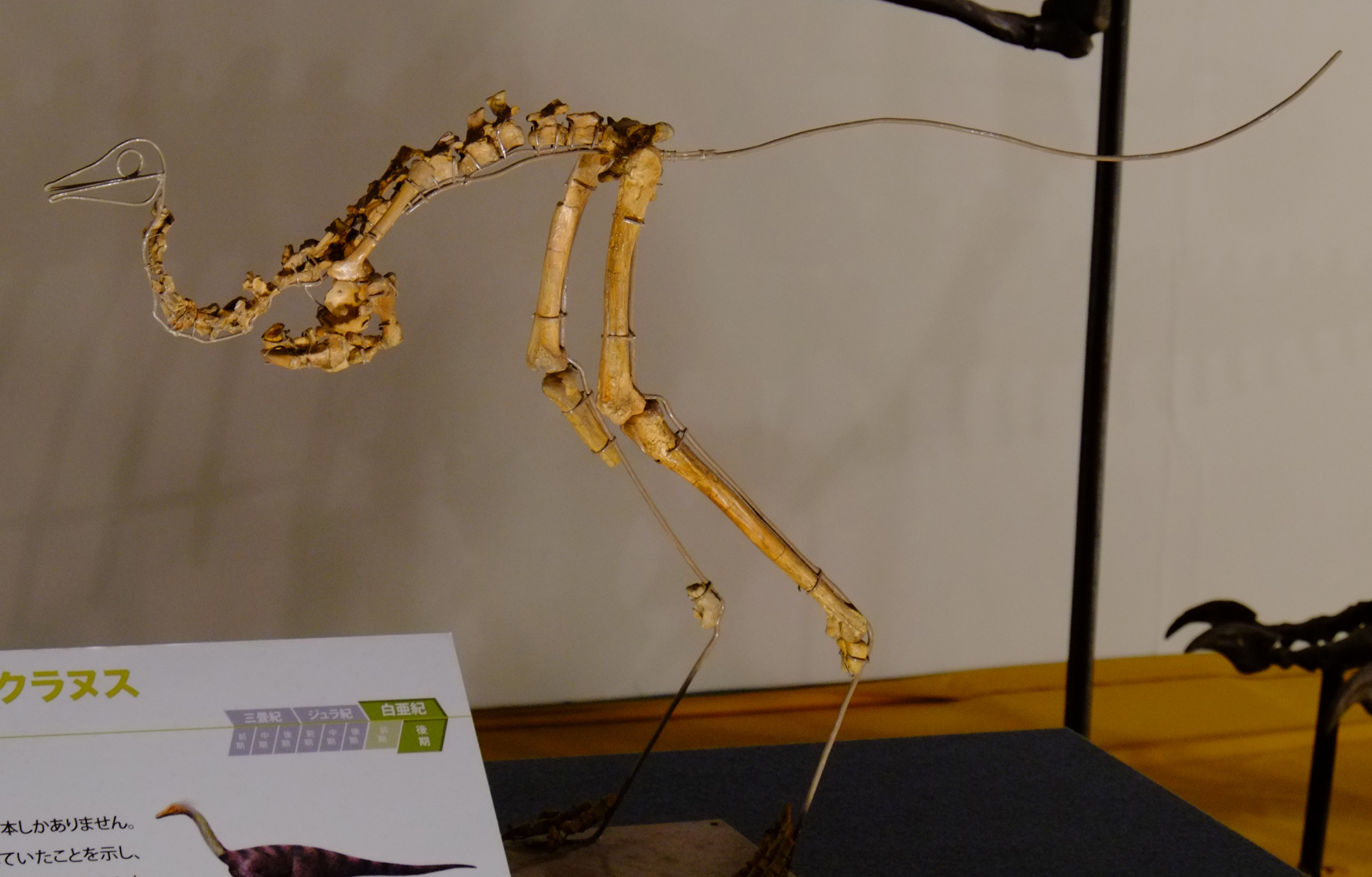
- Mounted holotype of Mononykus
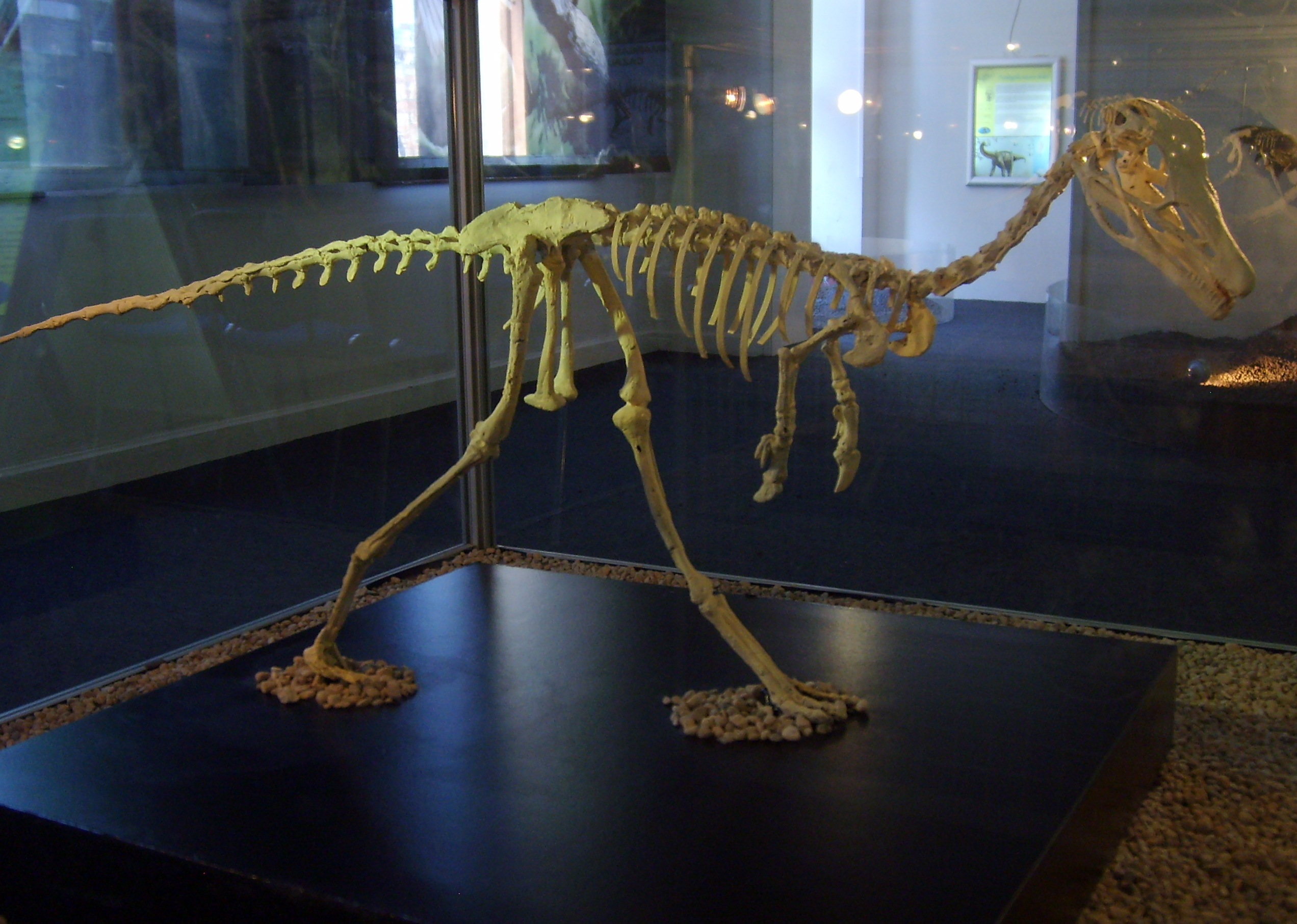
- Skeletal mount of Alvarezsaurus

Scientific classification
- Kingdom: Animalia
- Phylum: Chordata
- Class: Reptilia
- Clade: Dinosauria
- Clade: Saurischia
- Clade: Theropoda
- Superfamily: †Alvarezsauroidea
- Family: †Alvarezsauridae; Bonaparte, 1991

Type species
- †Alvarezsaurus calvoi Bonaparte, 1991

Subgroups
- †Achillesaurus?; †Alvarezsaurus; †Heptasteornis; †Patagonykinae?; †Bonapartenykus; †Patagonykus; †Parvicursorinae; †Dzharaonyx; †Jaculinykus; †Khulsanurus; †Kol; †Manipulonyx; †Nemegtonykus; †Ondogurvel; †Parvicursor; †Qiupanykus; †Trierarchuncus; †Ceratonykini; †Albinykus; †Ceratonykus; †Xixianykus; †Mononykini; †Albertonykus; †Linhenykus; †Mononykus; †Shuvuuia

Synonyms
- Bradycnemidae? Harrison & Walker, 1975 (in part); Parvicursoridae Karhu & Rautian, 1996; Mononykidae Chiappe et al., 1998

= Alvarezsauridae =

Alvarezsaurids Temporal range: Late Cretaceous, 97–66 Ma

Family of extinct long-legged dinosaurs

Alvarezsauridae is a family of small, long-legged dinosaurs. Although originally thought to represent the earliest known flightless birds, they are now thought to be an early diverging branch of maniraptoran theropods. Alvarezsaurids were highly specialized, with tiny, stout forelimbs ending in compact, bird-like hands. Their skeletons suggest that they had massive breast and arm muscles, possibly adapted for digging or tearing. They had long, tube-shaped snouts filled with tiny teeth. They have generally been interpreted as myrmecophagous, adapted to prey on colonial insects such as termites, with the short arms acting as effective digging instruments to break into nests. Alternative hypotheses of ovivory interpret the manus as specialized shell-cracking apparatuses, using the large claws and robust forelimbs to puncture eggs.

Alvarezsaurus, the type genus of the family, was named after the historian and physician Gregorio Álvarez. Fossils attributed to alvarezsaurids have been found in North America, South America, and Asia, and range in age from about 86 to 66 million years ago.

== History of study ==
Bonaparte (1991) described the first alvarezsaurid, Alvarezsaurus calvoi, from an incomplete skeleton found in Patagonia, Argentina. Bonaparte also named a family, Alvarezsauridae, to contain it. He argued that Alvarezsaurus might be most closely related to the ornithomimosaurs.

In 1993, Perle et al. described the next alvarezsaurid to be discovered, naming it Mononychus olecranus (meaning "one claw"). However, the spelling Mononychus was already in use by an extant beetle, so the name was changed to Mononykus a month later. Mononykus was initially described as a member of Avialae more advanced than Archaeopteryx, but the discovery of Patagonykus and reinterpretation of Alvarezsaurus created strong support for its inclusion in the Alvarezsauridae, and the subsequent inclusion of Alvarezsauridae within Avialae.

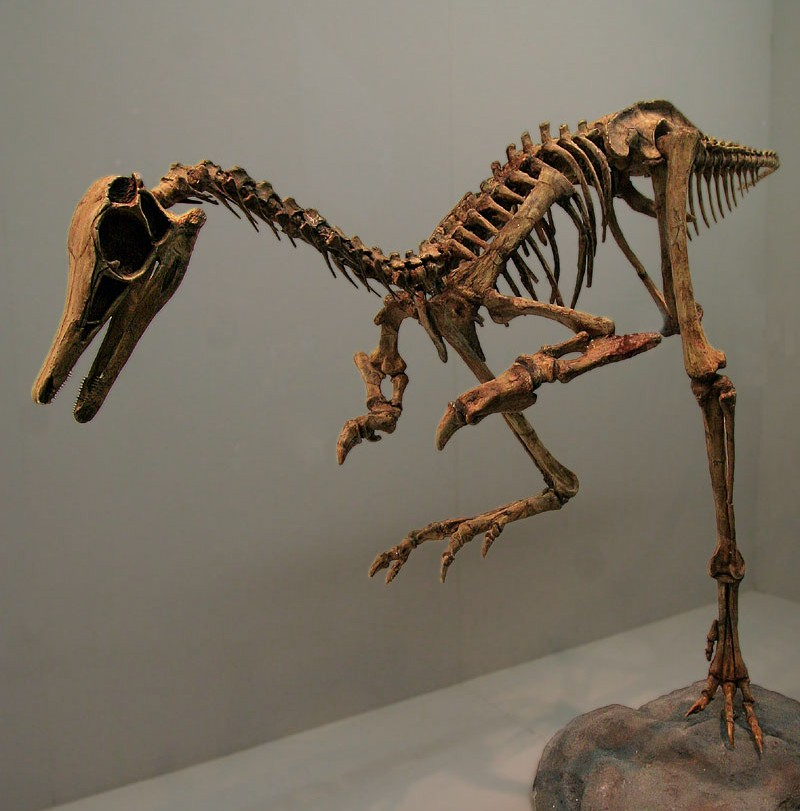
Reconstructed skeleton of Patagonykus puertai

Several researchers considered it unlikely that alvarezsaurids were members of Avialae. Similarities between birds and alvarezsaurids—like the keeled sternum—were argued to be examples of homoplasy, where the derived alvarezsaurids developed birdlike characters through convergent evolution rather than inheriting them from a common ancestor with birds. Sereno noted in 1997 that alvarezsaurids lack critical bird features, and in 1999 completed a new anatomical analysis of Dinosauria and found that alvarezsaurids were more parsimoniously related to the Ornithomimosauria.

However, when Chiappe et al. described the cranial material of Shuvuuia deserti in 1998, they found Alvarezsauridae to be a sister taxon to birds following Perle et al. Further cladistic analysis by Chiappe et al. refuted the avian placement, but still maintained its close relationship as an immediate outgroup to Aves. The 2010 description of the Chinese alvarezsauroid Haplocheirus sollers did not support this analysis, as Haplocheirus possesses more basal characteristics in line with non-avialan Maniraptorans.

== Description ==
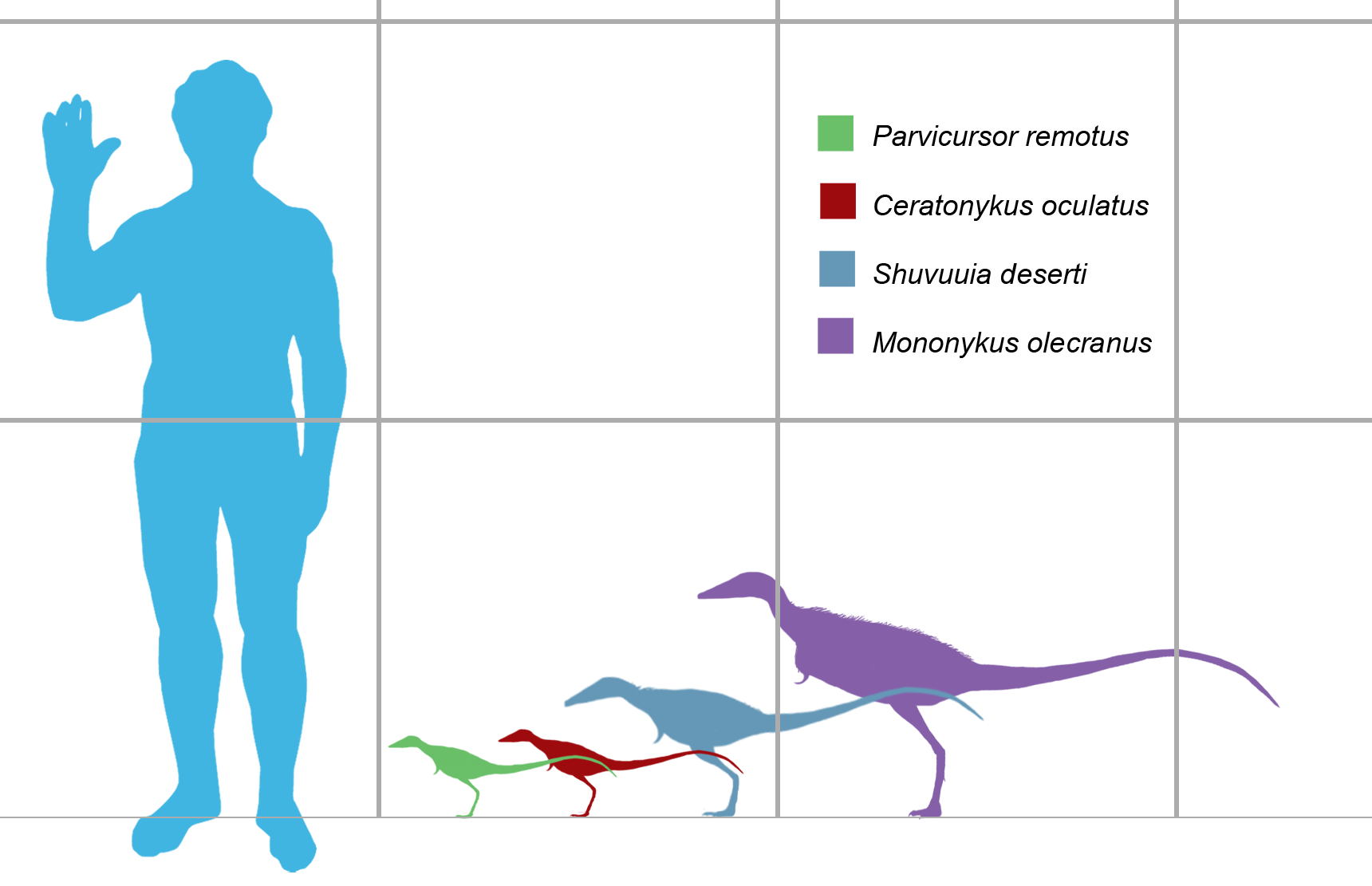
Size comparison of several parvicursorines: Parvicursor remotus (green), Ceratonykus oculatus (red), Shuvuuia deserti (blue), and Mononykus olecranus (violet).

Alvarezsaurids ranged from 50 centimetres (20 in) to 2 metres (6.6 ft) in length, although some possible members may have been larger, including the dubious European alvarezsaurid Heptasteornis that may have reached 2.5 metres (8.2 ft) long.

=== Feathers ===
At least one specimen of alvarezsaurid, from the species Shuvuuia deserti, preserved down-like, feathery integumental structures covering the fossil. Schweitzer et al. (1999) subjected these filaments to microscopic, morphological, mass spectrometric, and immunohistochemical studies and found that they consisted of beta-keratin, which is the primary protein in feathers.

== Lifestyle ==
The lifestyle of alvarezsaurids has been long debated. Chiappe hypothesized that their claws were used to strip vegetation, but numerous palaeontologists have suggested that they were used to break into ant and termite colonies instead. Studies of the tails in various alvarezsaurid genera suggest they were well-adapted for stabilization and balance, a feature that combined with the muscle moment arms of their forelimbs suggests that their ecological niches were similar to those of fossorial, myrmecophagous mammals such as aardvarks, pangolins, and anteaters. The arm anatomy, though, would require the animal to lie on its chest against a termite nest.

The long legs of alvarezsaurids appear to be built for speed, and the remarkable flexibility of their tails would allow them to make sharp turns while moving quickly. Such cursorial traits could feasibly apply to a fleeing prey species or an active predator. The large eye aperture of Shuvuuia and Haplocheirus suggest strong low-light vision, and the elongation of the cochlear in several alvarezsauroids duct may reflect well-developed hearing, both indicators of a nocturnal lifestyle. Because these traits are not exclusively beneficial to fossorial myrmecophages, alvarezsaurids may have had a more varied diet including other types of prey.

Alternative hypotheses for their lifestyle have been proposed. The proximity of the Qiupanykus holotype to possible oviraptorid eggs supports the hypothesis that advanced alvarezsaurids may also have specialized in nest raiding. The small fingers or spikes that accompany the large claw in several alvarezsaurids (such as in Manipulonyx) could have cradled the egg while the robust thumb claws punctured the shell.

== Classification ==
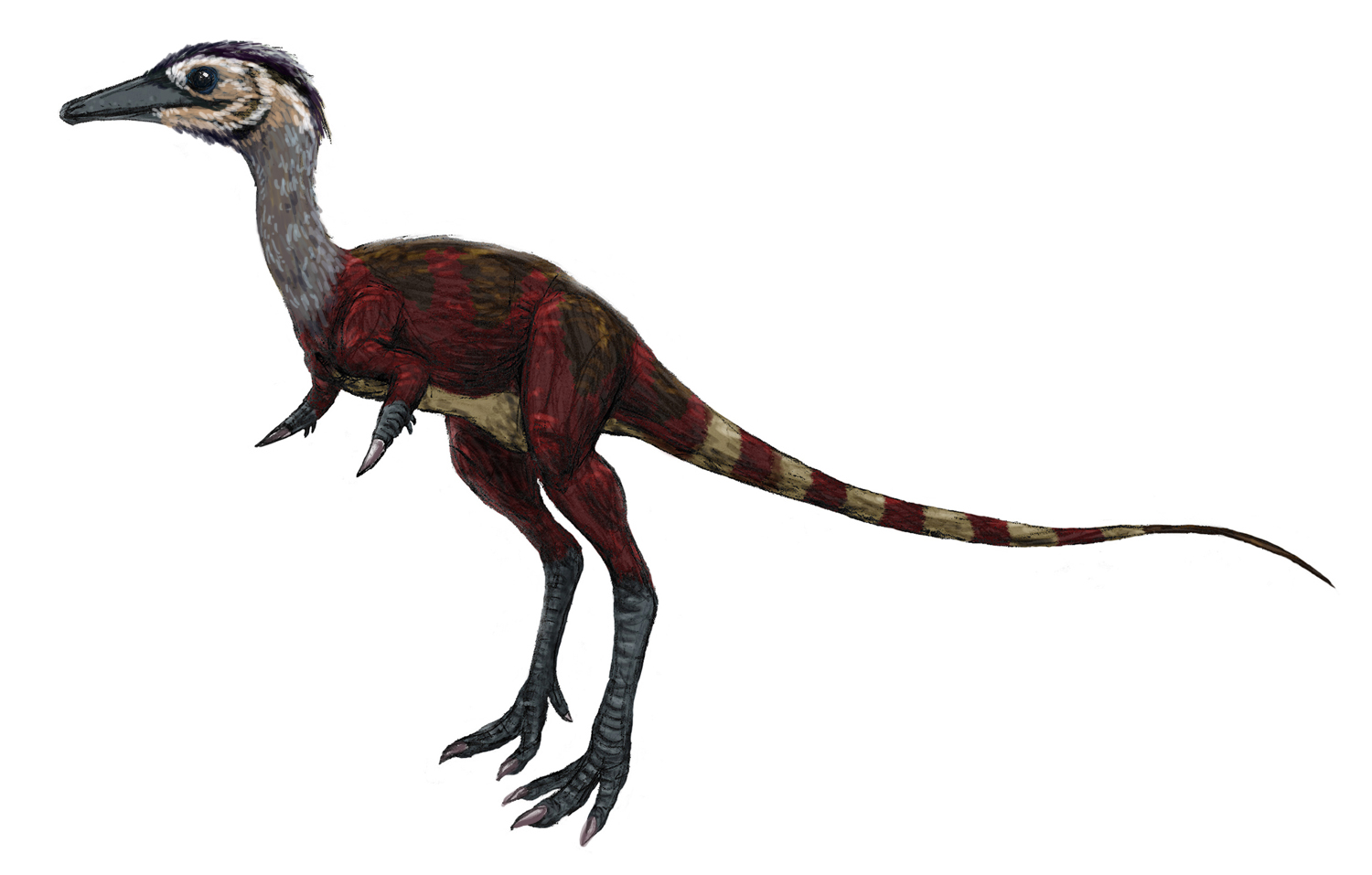
Life restoration of Shuvuuia deserti

Turner et al. (2007) place the alvarezsaurids as the most basal group in the Maniraptora, one step more derived than Ornitholestes and two more derived than the Ornithomimosauria. The alvarezsaurids are more primitive than the Oviraptorosauria.

Novas' description of Patagonykus demonstrated that it was a link between the more primitive (basal) Alvarezsaurus and the more advanced (derived) Mononykus and reinforced their monophyly. Parvicursor was discovered shortly after, and placed in its own family Parvicursoridae, and then Shuvuuia in 1998. Everything has since been lumped into Alvarezsauridae, with Mononykinae surviving as a subfamily.

There may be a relationship between the alvarezsaurids and the Ornithomimosauria as sister clades within either Thomas Holtz's Arctometatarsalia or Paul Sereno's Ornithomimiformes. The discovery of Haplocheirus, which exhibits transitional features between the more derived alvarezsaurids and other maniraptorans, particularly in relation to the skull structure and development of the hand, has provided further support for that relationship.

The taxonomy of the alvarezsaurids has been somewhat confused, due to different authors using different names for groups with the same definition. The family Alvarezsauridae was coined by Jose Bonaparte in 1991, but given no specific phylogenetic definition. Novas later defined the group as the most recent common ancestor of Alvarezsaurus and Mononykus plus all its descendants, though others, such as Paul Sereno, used a more inclusive definition, such as all dinosaurs closer to Shuvuuia than to modern birds. In 2009, Livezey and Zusi used the name Alvarezsauroidea for the total group of all alvarezsaurids, restricting the name Alvarezsauridae to the clade defined by Alvarezsaurus + Mononykus. This was followed by Choiniere and colleagues in 2010, who described the first non-alvarezsaurid alvarezsauroid, Haplocheirus. Some authors have used the name Mononykinae for the sub-group of alvarezsaurids including the advanced Mongolian species. However, Choiniere and colleagues argued that Parvicursorinae has priority, since its coordinate name under the ICZN Code, Parvicursoridae, was named earlier. Another subfamily, Patagonykinae, has been named to include the South American Patagonykus and Bonapartenykus, but a few recent studies have placed them just outside Alvarezsauridae, some of which do not even recover them in a single clade, making Patagonykinae turn out to be paraphyletic.

The cladogram below is the latest and most comprehensive analysis of alvarezsaurid evolution, following Meso et al. (2024).

- Alvarezsauridae
  - - Patagonykinae
      - Bonapartenykus ultimus
      - Patagonykus puertai
    - - Achillesaurus manazzonei
      - Alvarezsaurus calvoi
  - Parvicursorinae
    - Ceratonykus oculatus
    - - Khulsanurus magnificus
      - - Qiupanykus zhangi
        - - Dzharaonyx eski
          - - - Linhenykus monodactylus
              - Parvicursor remotus
            - Mononykini
              - Shuvuuia deserti
              - - Mononykus olecranus
                - - Ondogurvel alifanovi
                  - Albinykus baatar
