= Andrey Atuchin =

Russian paleoartist (born 1980)

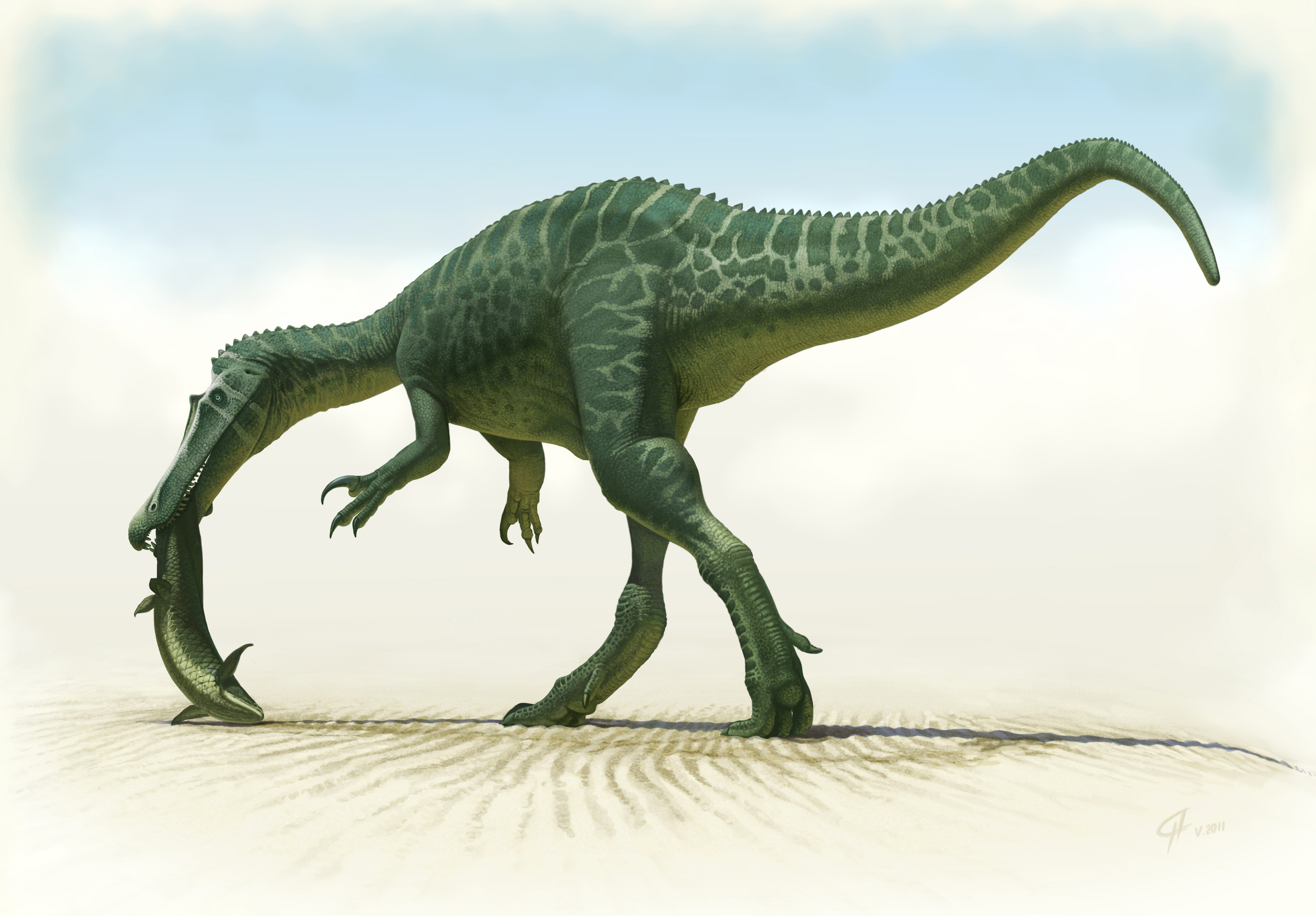
Life restoration of Baryonyx by Andrey Atuchin

Andrey Atuchin (born September 10, 1980) is a Russian paleoartist, illustrator and biologist who focuses on artistic reconstructions of extinct animals. He is known for his clean, detailed style reminiscent of classic National Geographic illustrations. Atuchin has collaborated with paleontologists all over the world in illustrating new species for papers and press releases, such as the 2014 feathered dinosaur Kulindadromeus zabaikalicus, as well as more recent discoveries including the pliosaur Luskhan itilensis, described in 2017, and the 2018 ankylosaur dinosaur Akainacephalus johnsoni.

Andrey won the Society of Vertebrate Paleontology's John J. Lanzendorf PaleoArt Prize in Scientific Illustration in 2020.

== Publications ==
- White, Steve (2017). Dinosaur Art II. Titan Books. pp. 76–97. ISBN 978-1785653988.
- Sadler, Christa (2016). Where Dinosaurs Roamed. Glen Canyon Natural History Association. pp. 1–160. ISBN 978-0-9622233-5-8.
- Molina-Pérez, Rubén (2016). Récords y curiosidades de los dinosaurios. LAROUSSE. pp. 1–288. ISBN 978-84-16641-15-4.
