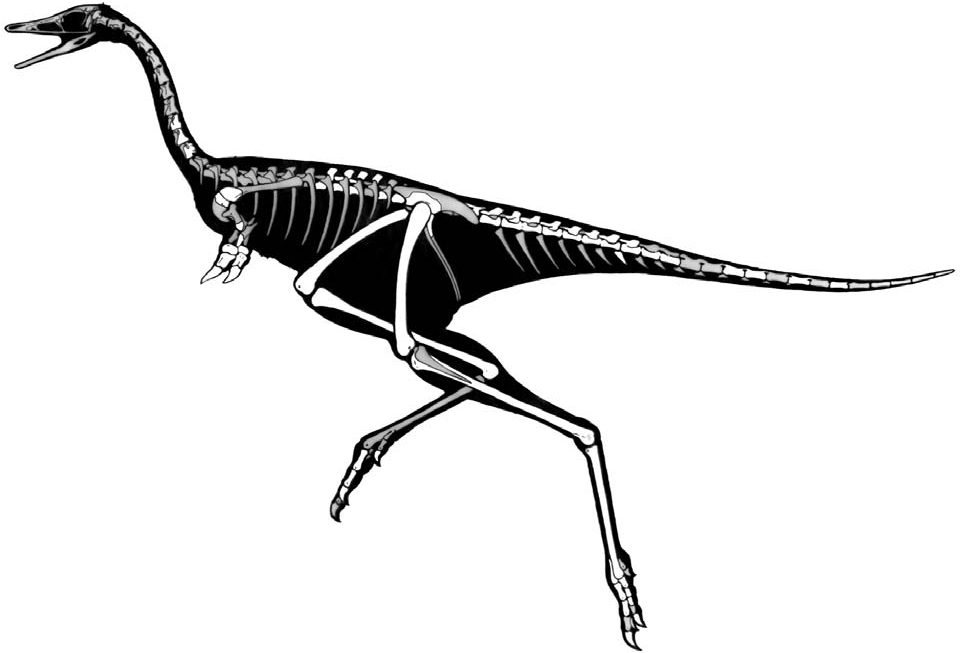
- Skeletal restoration, showing known parts in white

Scientific classification
- Kingdom: Animalia
- Phylum: Chordata
- Class: Reptilia
- Clade: Dinosauria
- Clade: Saurischia
- Clade: Theropoda
- Family: †Alvarezsauridae
- Subfamily: †Parvicursorinae
- Tribe: †Mononykini
- Genus: †Linhenykus; Xu et al., 2011
- Species: †L. monodactylus

Binomial name
- †Linhenykus monodactylus Xu et al., 2011

= Linhenykus =

Linhenykus Temporal range: Late Cretaceous, 75–71 Ma

Extinct genus of dinosaurs

Linhenykus is an extinct genus of alvarezsaurid theropod dinosaur from the Late Cretaceous of Inner Mongolia, China. It is the most basal known member of the Parvicursorinae. The genus gets its name from Linhe, a city near the site where the fossil was first found and Greek nykus, "claw". The specific name is derived from Greek monos, "single", and daktylos, "finger", a reference to the fact that it is the only known non-avian dinosaur to have had but a single digit.

== Description ==
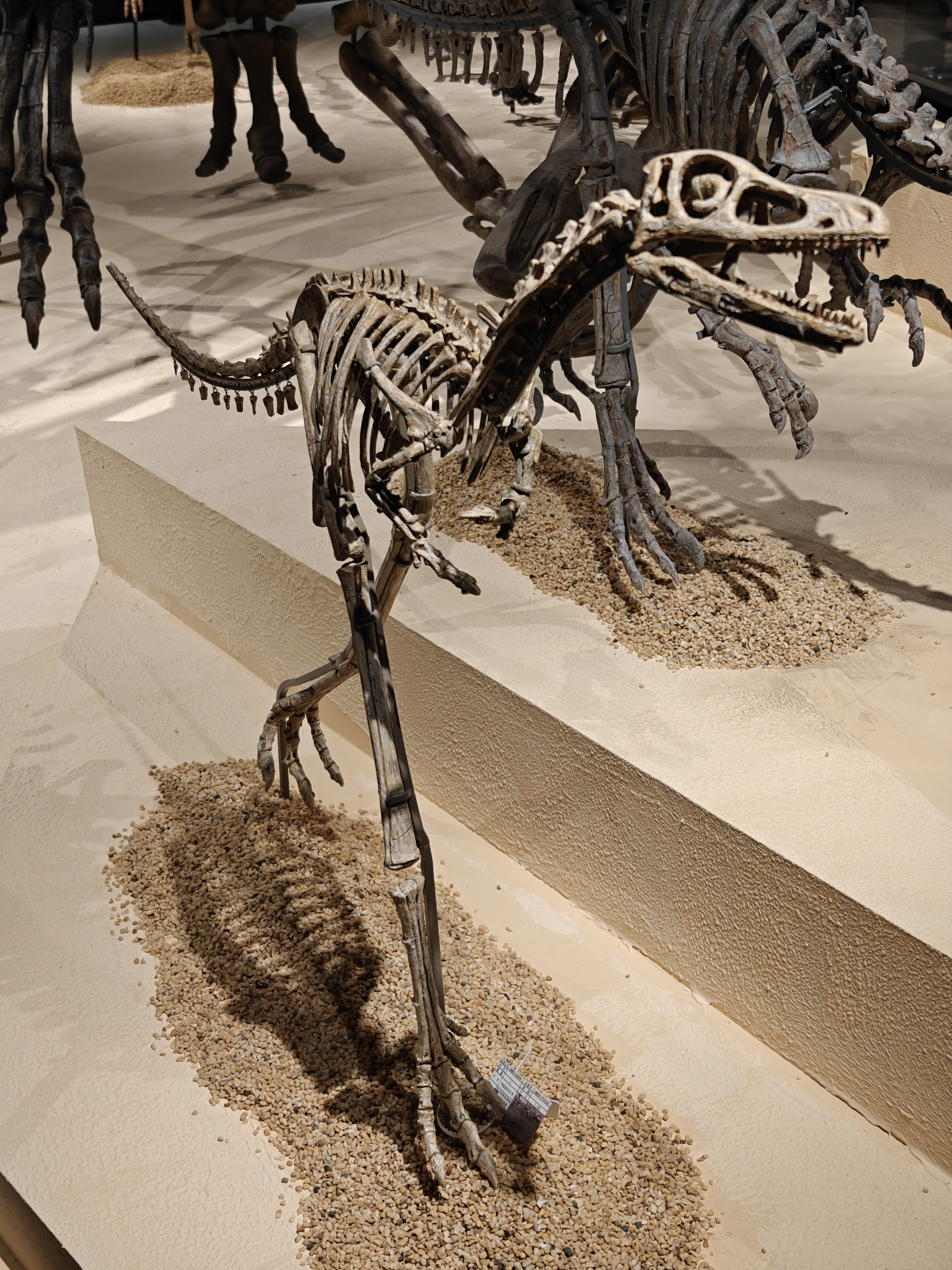
Mounted skeleton of L. monodactylus, incorporating holotype materials.

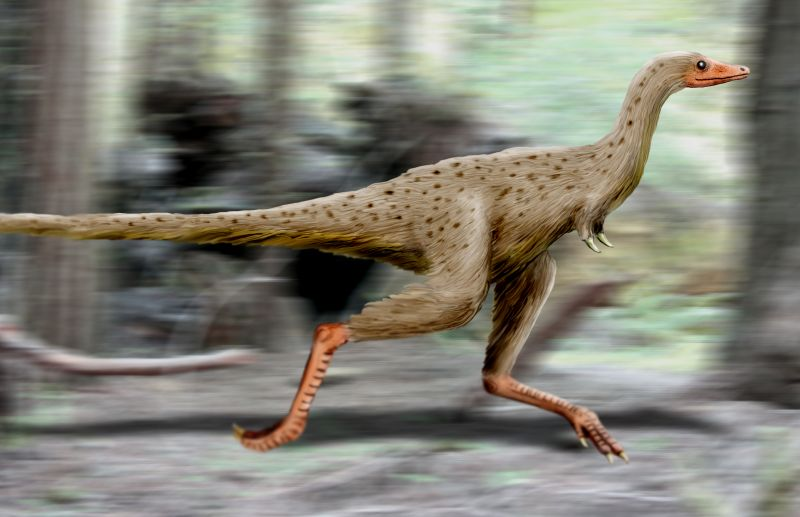
Reconstruction by Nobu Tamura.

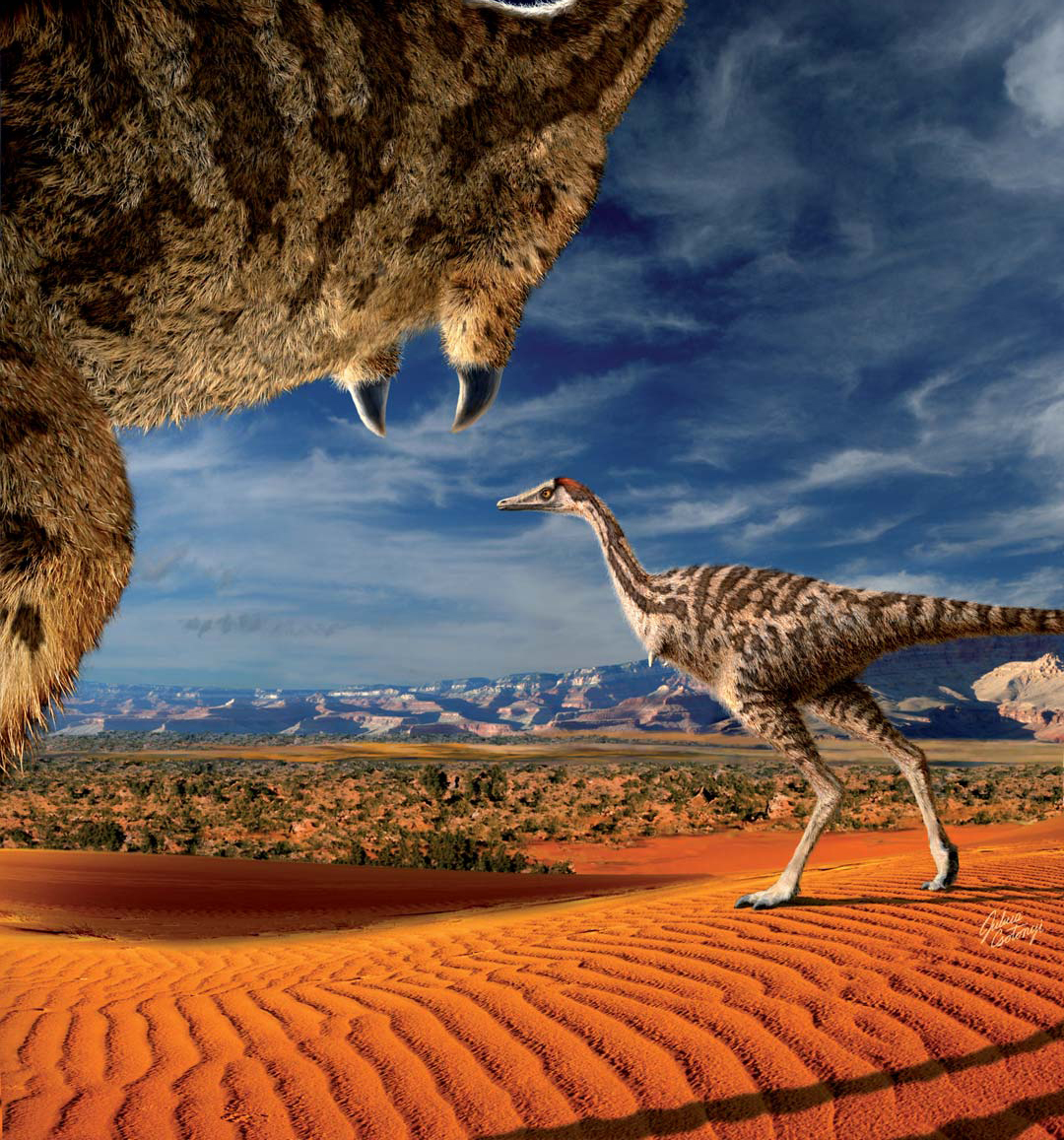
Reconstruction by Julius Csotonyi.

Linhenykus was a small dinosaur, measuring 50 cm (1.6 ft) long and weighing 500 g (18 oz). Its femur length is 7 centimetres (2.8 in).

Alvarezsauroids are known for their short forelimbs, each with a single greatly enlarged second digit. Although alvarezsaurids were once thought to have only a single digit on each forelimb, more recent evidence has shown that most species have reduced third and fourth digits. Linhenykus is the first known alvarezsaurid to have only a single, second digit. Although a reduced third metacarpal is present, the phalanges or finger bones of the third digit was entirely lost. The fourth metacarpal is not preserved in the Linhenykus holotype, but given that digit III is a reduced structure lacking phalanges, it is probable that this metacarpal is entirely absent in Linhenykus. Despite having the most reduced digits of any alvarezsauroid, Linhenykus was shown by cladistic analysis to have been a basal form as is indicated by the fact that its enlarged digit is not as large or robust as with more advanced forms.

Some scientists have suggested Linhenykus, like other alvarezsaurids, was insectivorous, using its claws to dig into ant and termite nests, similar to modern anteaters.

== Discovery ==
The fossil of Linhenykus was collected by Jonah N. Choiniere and Michael Pittman from the Late Cretaceous Wulansuhai Formation of Nei Mongol (Inner Mongolia), China. Biostratigraphic and lithographic correlations suggest that the formation dates to the Campanian and Maastrichtian stages, 75-71 Ma. Linhenykus is currently known from a partial skeleton, holotype IVPP V17608, including cervical, dorsal, sacral and caudal vertebrae, forelimb, hindlimbs, and pelvis, and a referred complete pes (anatomy). The genus was first described and named in the Proceedings of the National Academy of Sciences by Xu Xing, Corwin Sullivan, Pittman, Choiniere, David Hone, Paul Upchurch, Tan Qingwei, Xiao Dong, Lin Tan and Han Fenglu in 2011. In 2013, an osteological monograph of the genus was published which included a quantitative analysis of alvarezsauroid biogeography. The latter found statistically significant biogeographic reconstructions suggesting a dominant role for sympatric (or ‘within area’) events, combined with a mix of vicariance, dispersal and regional extinction.

It has been suggested that Linhenykus may be a junior synonym of Parvicursor, but this interpretation was rejected by the original authors and has not been adopted in subsequent research on alvarezsauroids.

== Classification ==
The cladogram below shows the phylogenetic position among alvarezsaurids following Makovicky, Apesteguía and Gianechini (2012).

- Alvarezsauridae
  - Alvarezsaurus calvoi
  - - Alnashetri cerropoliciensis
    - Bonapartenykus ultimus
    - Patagonykus puertai
    - - Linhenykus monodactylus
      - - - Albinykus baatar
          - Xixianykus zhangi
        - - Mononykus olecranus
          - Shuvuuia deserti
