= Achillesaurus =

Achillesaurus Temporal range: Santonian ~85 Ma

Scientific classification
- Kingdom: Animalia
- Phylum: Chordata
- Class: Reptilia
- Clade: Dinosauria
- Clade: Saurischia
- Clade: Theropoda
- Genus: †Achillesaurus
- Species: †A. manazzonei

Binomial name
- †Achillesaurus manazzonei Martinelli & Vera 2007

Extinct genus of dinosaurs

Achillesaurus is a genus of alvarezsaurid theropod dinosaur from the Santonian-aged (Late Cretaceous) Bajo de la Carpa Formation of Rio Negro, Argentina. It contains one species, Achillesaurus manazzonei.

== Discovery and naming ==
The holotype specimen of Achillesaurus, MACN-PV-RN 1116, was discovered in 1995 by a team of the Museo Argentino de Ciencias Naturales “Bernardino Rivadavia” led by Dr. José F. Bonaparte. It was found in the Paso Córdova Locality, Río Negro Province, northern Patagonia, where the Santonian-aged Bajo de la Carpa Formation outcrops.

Its genus name was chosen in reference to Achilles' heel, because diagnostic features are found there for these animals, while the species name honors Professor Rafael Manazzone, an amateur paleontologist whose knowledge of Patagonian fossils and localities assisted the researchers on their field trips.

== Description ==
The genus was a relatively large, basal alvarezsaurid, and a contemporary of Alvarezsaurus. It is only known from MACN-PV-RN 1116, a partial skeleton including a sacral vertebra, four tail vertebrae, part of the left thighbone, shin and foot, and the left ilium. Agustín Martinelli and Ezequiel Vera, who described the specimen, performed a phylogenetic analysis and found their new genus to be an alvarezsaurid with an unresolved relationship to Alvarezsaurus and more derived alvarezsaurids.

However, Makovicky, Apesteguía & Gianechini (2012) argued that Achillesaurus might actually be a junior synonym of Alvarezsaurus, which, according to the authors, "is known from the same formation and from which it [i.e. Achillesaurus] differs trivially."
