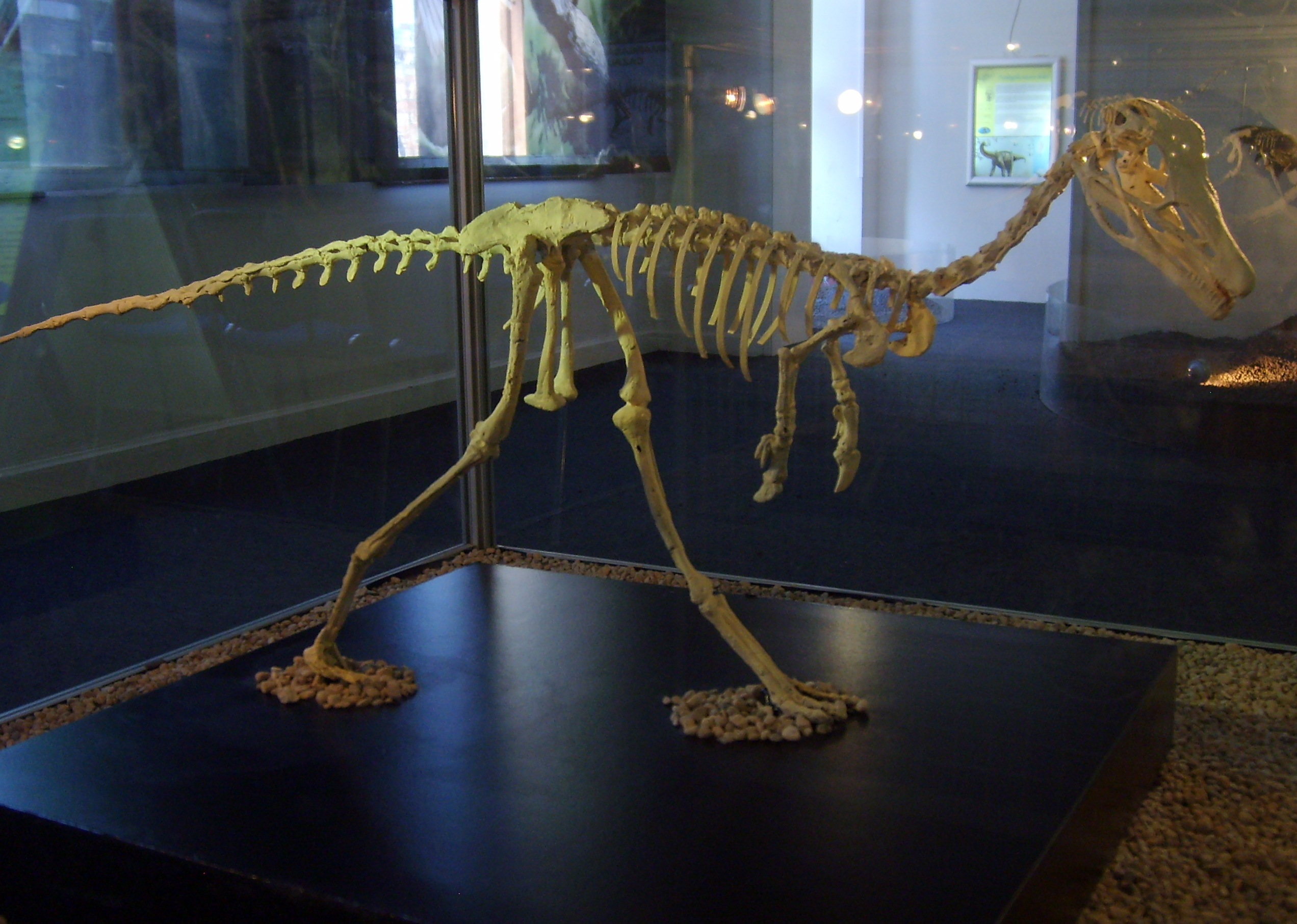
- Skeleton restoration

Scientific classification
- Kingdom: Animalia
- Phylum: Chordata
- Class: Reptilia
- Clade: Dinosauria
- Clade: Saurischia
- Clade: Theropoda
- Family: †Alvarezsauridae
- Genus: †Alvarezsaurus; Bonaparte, 1991
- Species: †A. calvoi

Binomial name
- †Alvarezsaurus calvoi Bonaparte, 1991

Synonyms
- Achillesaurus? Martinelli & Vera, 2007

= Alvarezsaurus =

Alvarezsaurus Temporal range: Late Cretaceous(Santonian), 86–83 Ma

Extinct genus of dinosaurs

Alvarezsaurus (/ˌælvərɛzˈsɔːrəs/; "Don Gregorio Alvarez's lizard") is a genus of alvarezsaurid dinosaur from the Late Cretaceous, living in Argentina approximately 86 - 83 million years ago. It was a small dinosaur, measuring 1–1.4 m (3.3–4.6 ft) long and weighing approximately 3 kg (6.6 lb). It was found in the Bajo de la Carpa Formation and was named by paleontologist José Bonaparte in 1991 after the historian Don Gregorio Alvarez. The type species is A. calvoi.

== Description ==
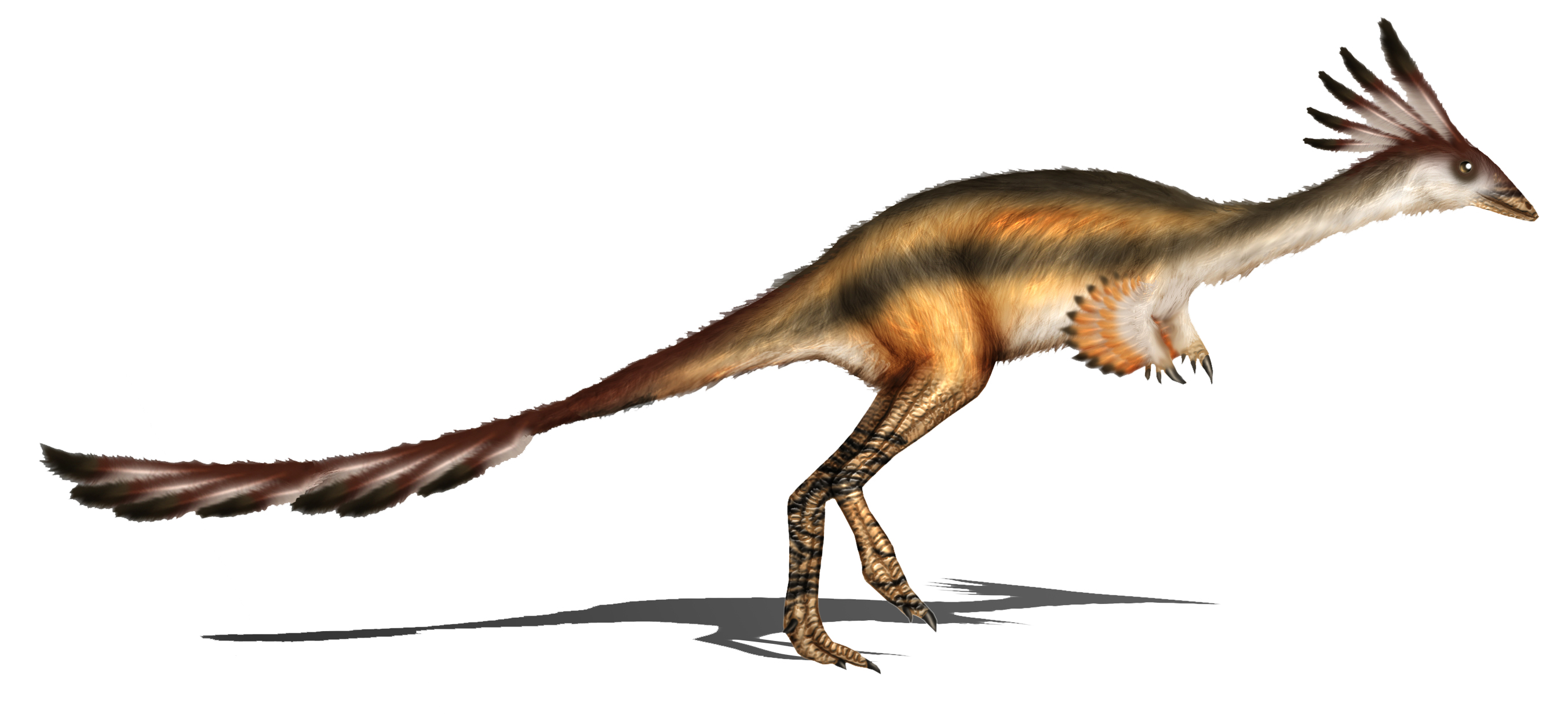
Restoration.

Growing to measure 1–1.4 m (3.3–4.6 ft) and weigh around 3 kg (6.6 lb), Alvarezsaurus was a bipedal theropod. Like other lightweight theropods, it had a long tail, and its leg structure suggests that it was a fast runner. The most proximal elements of Alvarezsaurus caudal vertebrae exhibited ventrally sharp centra and the transverse processes of these vertebrae were sub-triangular and laterodistally directed, features seen in other alvarezsaurids like Shuvuuia. Spinal processes were entirely absent or poorly developed, and each caudal vertebra supported short prezygapophyses. The scapula was visibly curved and proportionally smaller than those of other alvarezsaurids, and unlike its relatives Alvarezsaurus did not have a fused astragalus and calcaneum. It was unique in that its metatarsal III was its longest, followed by an unusually long metatarsal IV. It may have been insectivorous.

== Classification ==
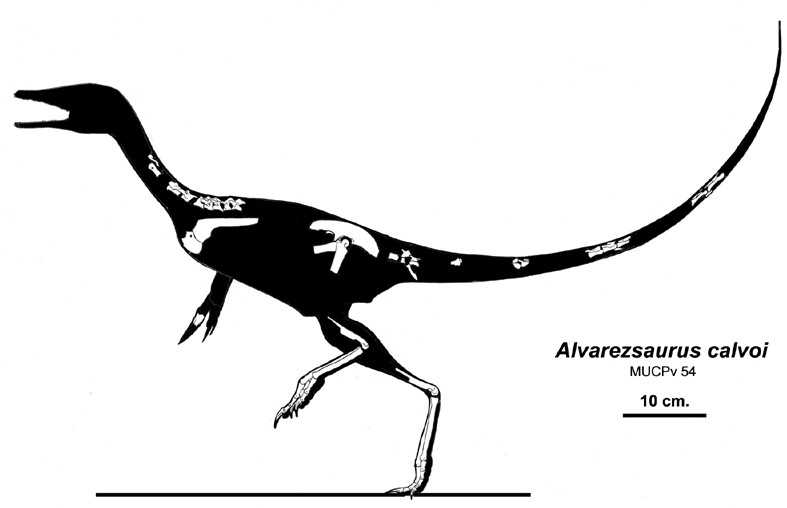
Skeletal diagram of known remains.

Alvarezsaurus is considered basal to better-known members of its family, such as Mononykus and Shuvuuia. It has been alternately classified with both non-avian theropod dinosaurs and early birds, but a move of the alvarezsaurids to be recognized as more closely related to neornithine birds proved controversial despite being supported by earlier studies. It was once believed that the Patagonian alvarezsaur taxa were the most basal of their family, but the discovery of a more basal member, Haplocheirus, disproved that when its fossils were discovered in China.
