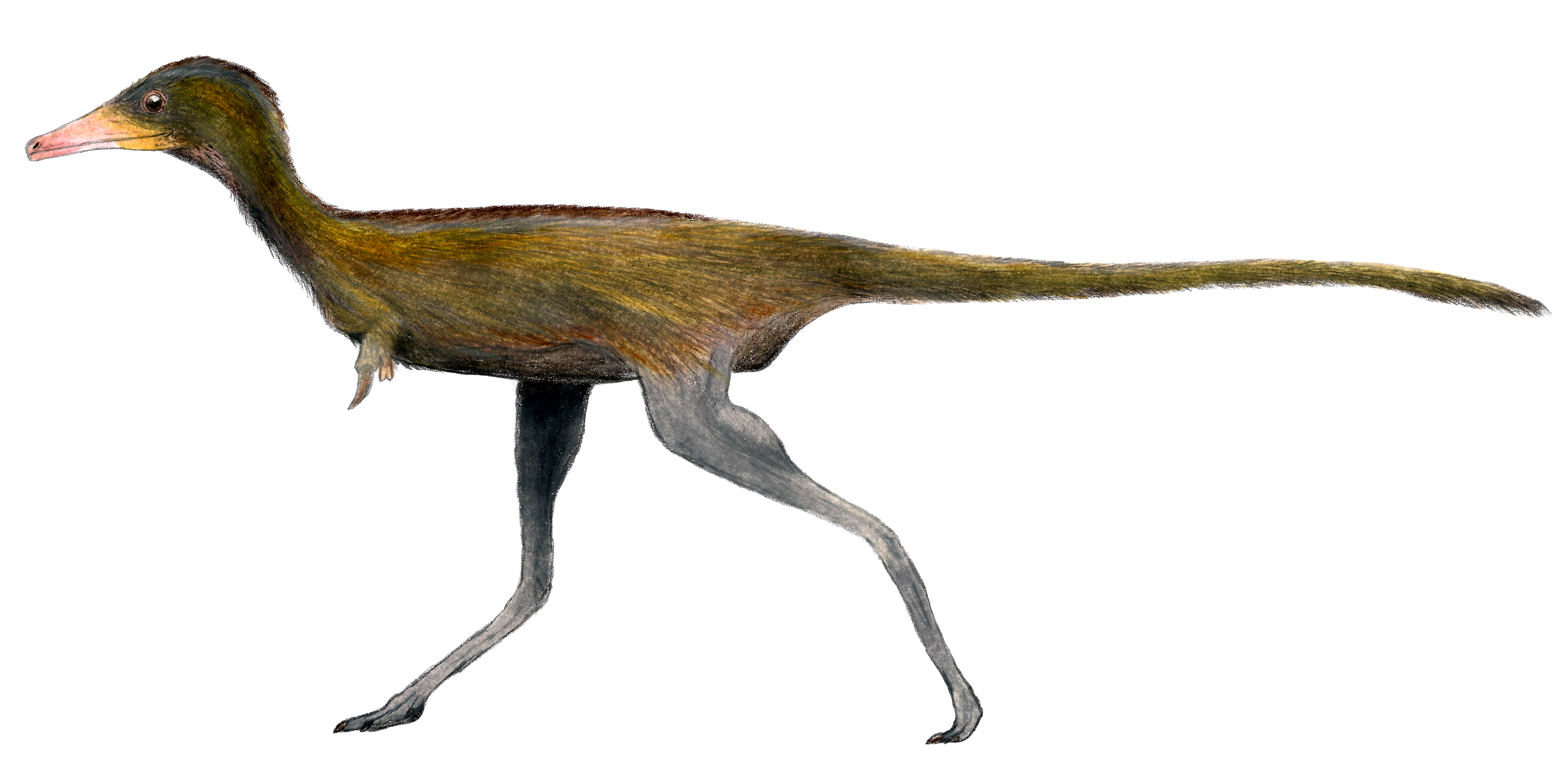
- Restoration

Scientific classification
- Kingdom: Animalia
- Phylum: Chordata
- Class: Reptilia
- Clade: Dinosauria
- Clade: Saurischia
- Clade: Theropoda
- Family: †Alvarezsauridae
- Genus: †Albinykus; Nesbitt et al., 2011
- Species: †A. baatar

Binomial name
- †Albinykus baatar Nesbitt et al., 2011

= Albinykus =

Albinykus Temporal range: Santonian ~85.8–84.9 Ma

Extinct genus of reptiles

Albinykus (meaning "Albin claw", after a term used by Mongolian shamans to describe light phenomena in the Gobi Desert) is a genus of alvarezsaurid dinosaur whose fossils have been found in the Late Cretaceous-aged (Santonian) Javkhlant Formation in the Gobi Desert of Mongolia. The type species, A. baatar, was named by Sterling J. Nesbitt, Julia A. Clarke, Alan H. Turner and Mark A. Norell in 2011.

Estimated at under 1 kilogram (2.2 lb) in weight, Albinykus was one of the smallest alvarezsaurs and among the smallest non avian dinosaurs. The body size of alvarezsaurs decreased throughout their evolutionary history, and Albinykus represents a particularly derived form. One distinguishing feature of Albinykus not seen in other alvarezsaurids is the complete fusion of the tarsals to other bones of the leg; the proximal tarsals are fused to the tibia bone of the lower leg and the distal tarsals are fused to the metatarsal bones of the foot.

The holotype skeleton of Albinykus, specimen IGM 100/3004 consisting of the pelvis and the hindlimbs, is postured in a sitting position with feet tucked underneath the body. This posture is similar to that of birds, an indication of the close relationship between nonavian maniraptoran dinosaurs and birds. Although oviraptorids and troodontids are known to have assumed this posture, the holotype of Albinykus is the first example of a crouching alvarezsaurid. Scientists are unsure about how the dinosaur died to keep it in the position it was in but it is possible Albinykus suffocated under sand.
