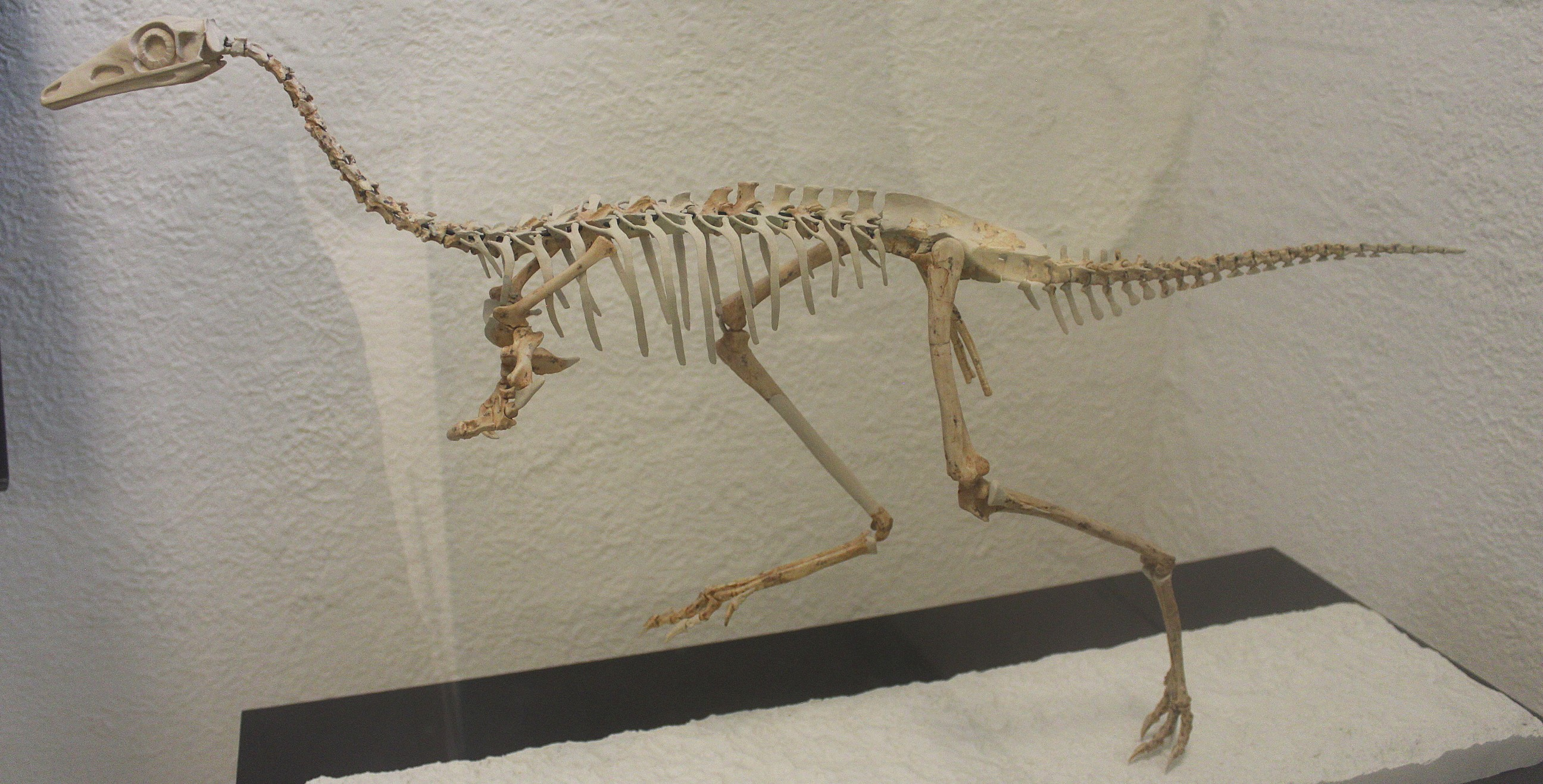
- Reconstructed skeleton at the American Museum of Natural History

Scientific classification
- Kingdom: Animalia
- Phylum: Chordata
- Class: Reptilia
- Clade: Dinosauria
- Clade: Saurischia
- Clade: Theropoda
- Family: †Alvarezsauridae
- Subfamily: †Parvicursorinae
- Tribe: †Mononykini
- Genus: †Mononykus; Perle et al., 1993

Type species
- †Mononykus olecranus Perle et al., 1993

Synonyms
- Mononychus olecranus Perle et al., 1993 (preoccupied generic name)

= Mononykus =

Mononykus Temporal range: Late Cretaceous, Maastrichtian

Extinct genus of dinosaurs

Mononykus (/məˈnɒnɪkəs/ mə-NON-ik-əs, sometimes /ˌmɒnoʊˈnaɪkəs/ MON-oh-NY-kəs; meaning "one claw") is a genus of alvarezsaurid dinosaur that lived during the Late Cretaceous in what is now Mongolia, specifically the Nemegt Formation. Mononykus was a very small theropod, estimated around 1 to 1.2 metres (3.3 to 3.9 ft) in length with a weight of 3.5 kilograms (7.7 lb). As in Shuvuuia, Mononykus likely developed a shaggy feathering. It was lightly built with long, thin legs and highly reduced and specialized forelimbs that were likely used for foraging termite mounds or other insect colonies.

== History of discovery ==
=== Accepted specimens ===
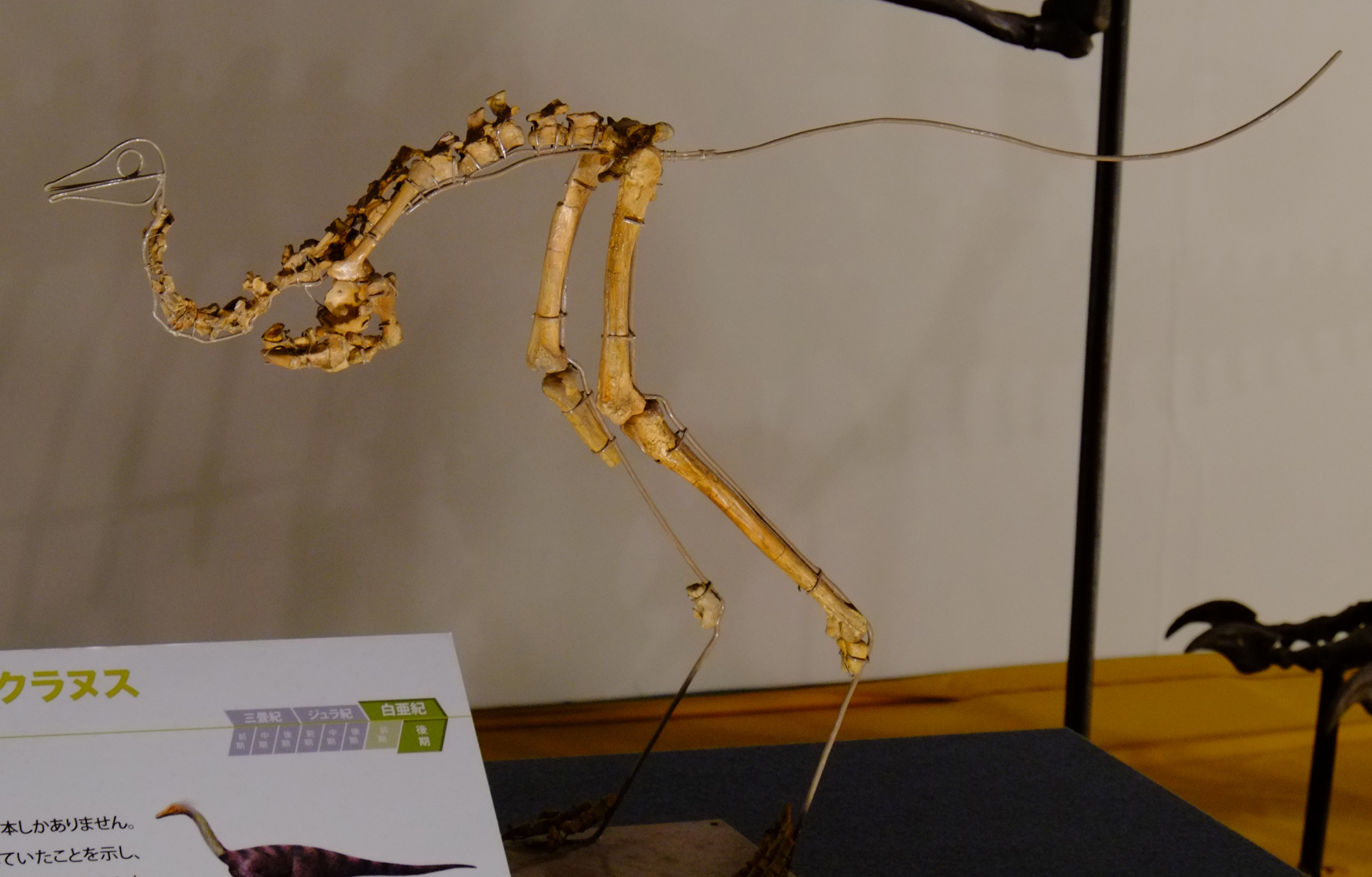
Mounted holotype at the Giga Dinosaur Exhibition 2017, Japan

The holotype specimen, catalog number MPC-D 107/6 (formerly IGM 107/6), was collected in 1987 from the Bügiin Tsav locality of the Nemegt Formation, Gobi Desert. This single specimen consists of a partial skeleton lacking a tail, and only small fragments of skull bones, including a complete braincase.

In 2019, Sungjin Lee and colleagues referred a new specimen from the Nemegt Formation, MPC-D 100/206. This specimen consists of seven caudal vertebrae with a partial left hindlimb, and was discovered on a low slope of the Altan Uul III locality in 2008 by an international team of the Korea-Mongolia International Dinosaur Expedition (KID). The team also found a small assemblage of theropod fossils comprising specimens from other taxa such as Gobiraptor and Nemegtonykus.

=== Reassigned fossils ===
Several other specimens were later misclassified as Mononykus, including specimens with partial tails (initially misinterpreted as being very short, though later specimens showed they were long and thin) and complete skulls showing a distinct, mostly toothless form. However, these specimens have since been reclassified in the new genus Shuvuuia. Because of this, many reconstructions of Mononykus in art and mounted skeletons in museums are in fact based mainly on Shuvuuia.

While Mononykus was formally described in the 1990s, it was reported that a specimen possibly belonging to this genus had already been unearthed by the Andrews expedition decades before. The specimen had been in the American Museum of Natural History collection, labeled simply as "bird-like dinosaur". However, given the reassignment of the other specimens to related genera, and the difference in age (the AMNH specimen is from the older Djadochta Formation), it is unlikely to be Mononykus.

== Taxonomy ==
Mononykus was originally named Mononychus in 1993, but later that year, it was renamed because the original name had already been used for a beetle named by Johann Schueppel, a German entomologist.

== Description ==
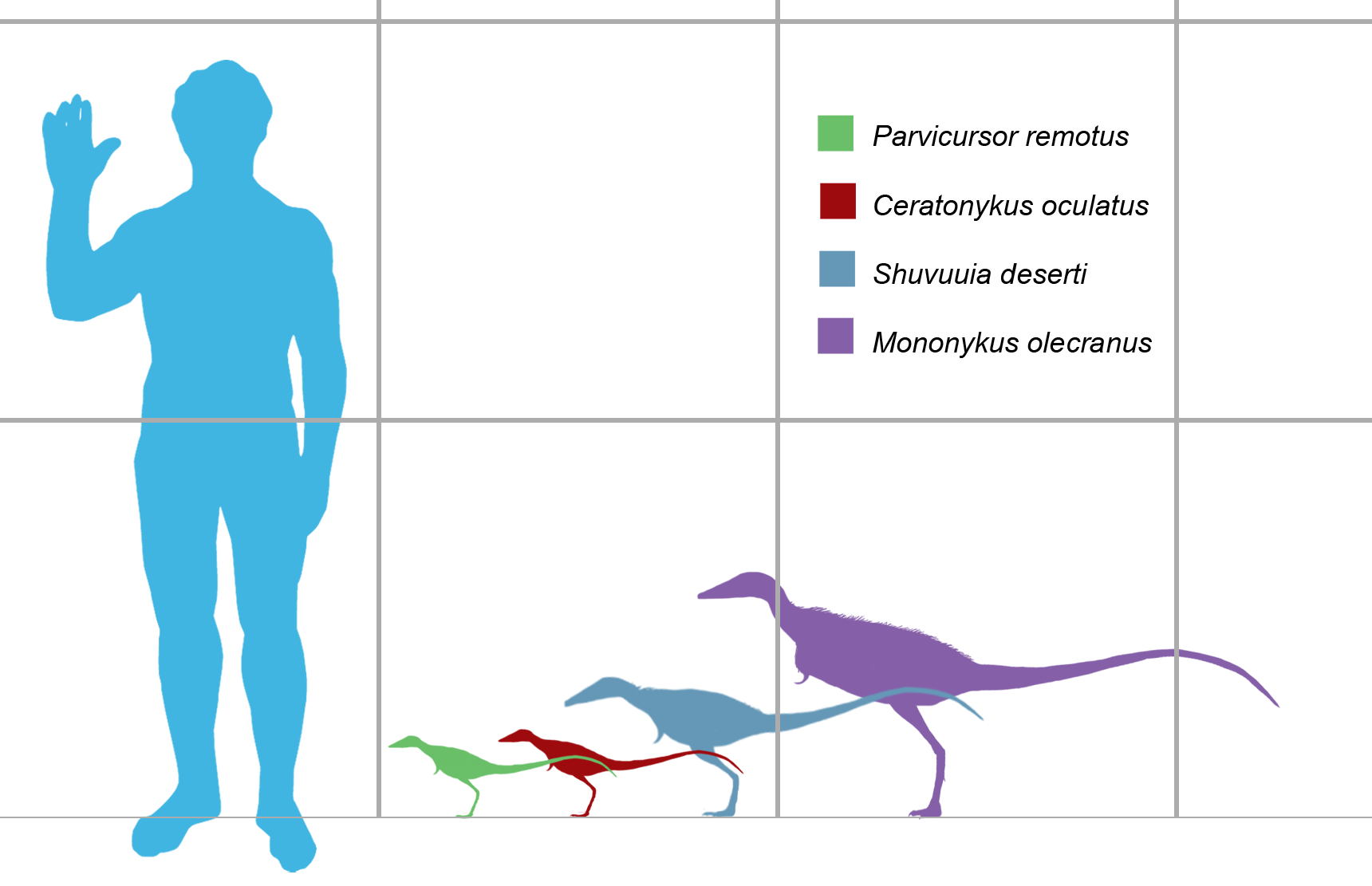
Size of Mononykus (in violet) compared to other alvarezsaurids

Mononykus was a small dinosaur around 1 to 1.2 metres (3.3 to 3.9 ft) long and weighing 3.5 kilograms (7.7 lb). Other characteristics include fused wrist bones similar to those of birds, and a keeled breastbone. It differed from close relatives Shuvuuia and Parvicursor in several details of its skeleton, including a pubic bone that is triangular in cross section, and different proportions in the toe bones. Mononykus likely had a covering of feathers, as in the fossils of its relative Shuvuuia feather traces were discovered, proving that Alvarezsauridae were among the theropod lineages with feathery or downy integument. The inner ear structures of Mononykus and its relatives closely resembles those of barn owls. For this reason it is possible Mononykus also had a facial disc of specialized feathers, similar to extant owls, that served to catch sound and direct it to the ears.

== Paleobiology ==
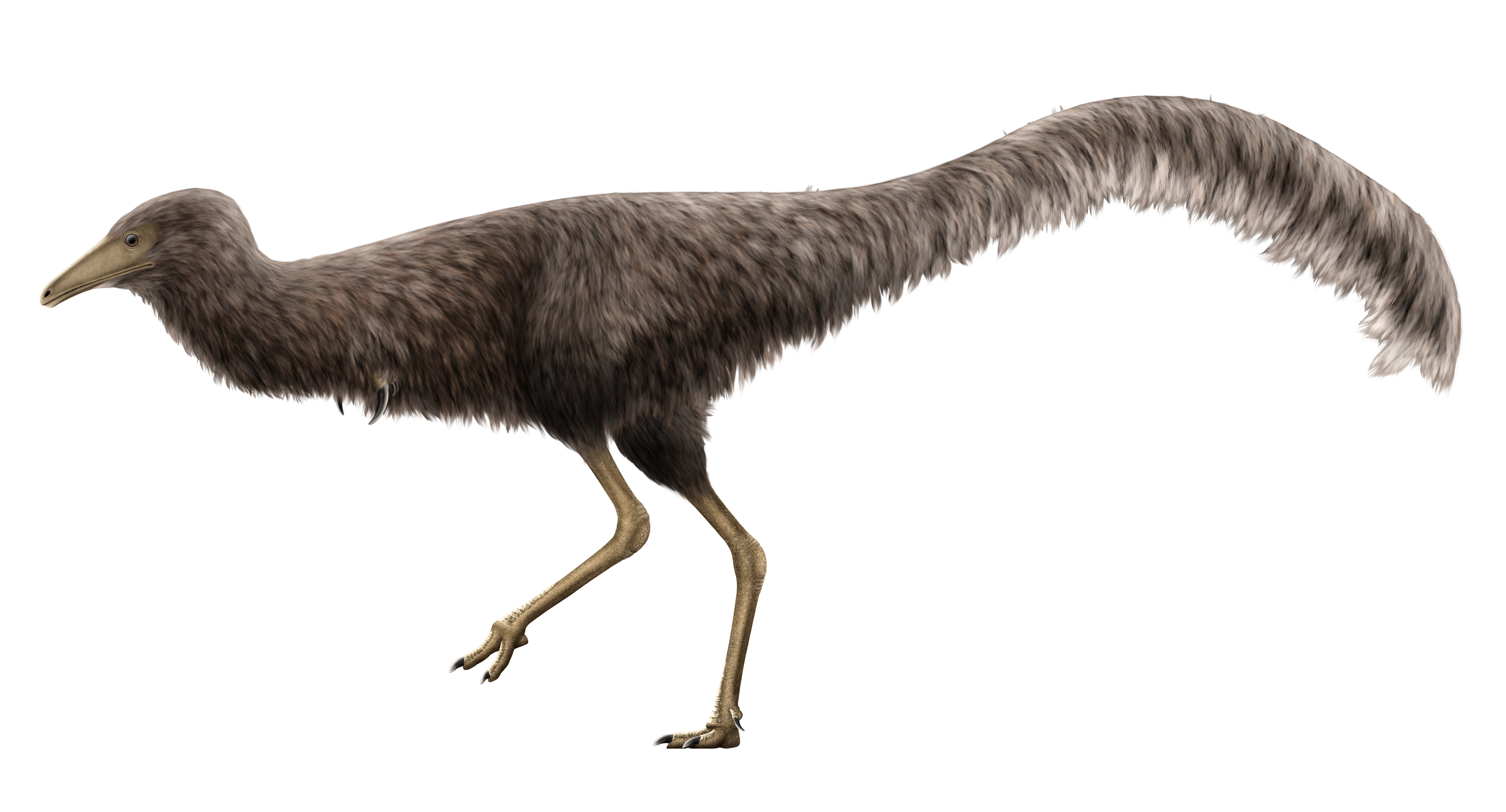
Life restoration

Mononykus was a member of the family Alvarezsauridae and, like its relatives, had very strange, stubby forearms with one large, approximately 7.5-centimetre (3.0 in) long claw (hence its name). The other two claws had disappeared (however, a close relative of Mononykus, Shuvuuia, had two vestigial claws, alongside one large claw). The purpose of these highly specialized arms is still a mystery, but some scientists have suggested they were used to break open termite mounds (like modern anteaters), and therefore it is possible that they fed primarily on insects.

In a 2001 study conducted by Bruce Rothschild and other paleontologists, 15 foot bones referred to Mononykus were examined for signs of stress fracture, but none were found.
