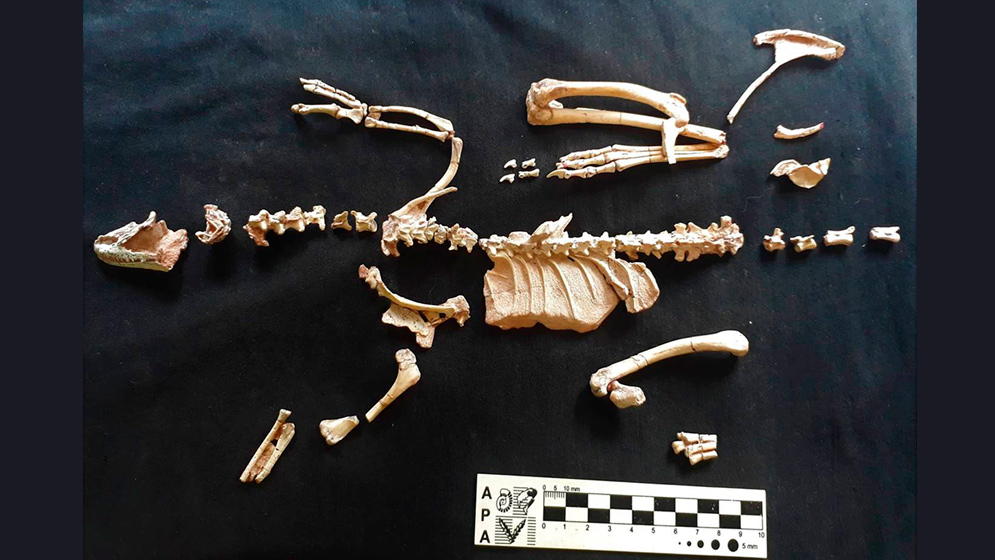
- MPCA Pv 377, an articulated skeleton referred to A. cerropoliciensis

Scientific classification
- Kingdom: Animalia
- Phylum: Chordata
- Class: Reptilia
- Clade: Dinosauria
- Clade: Saurischia
- Clade: Theropoda
- Superfamily: †Alvarezsauroidea
- Genus: †Alnashetri; Makovicky, Apesteguía & Gianechini, 2012

Type species
- †Alnashetri cerropoliciensis Makovicky, Apesteguía & Gianechini, 2012

= Alnashetri =

Alnashetri Temporal range: Albian ~111–106 Ma

Extinct genus of dinosaurs

Alnashetri is an extinct genus of alvarezsauroid coelurosaurian theropod dinosaur known from the Early Cretaceous (Albian stage) of La Buitrera, Río Negro Province, Argentina. It contains one known species, Alnashetri cerropoliciensis. Its remains were discovered in Candeleros Formation.

== Discovery ==
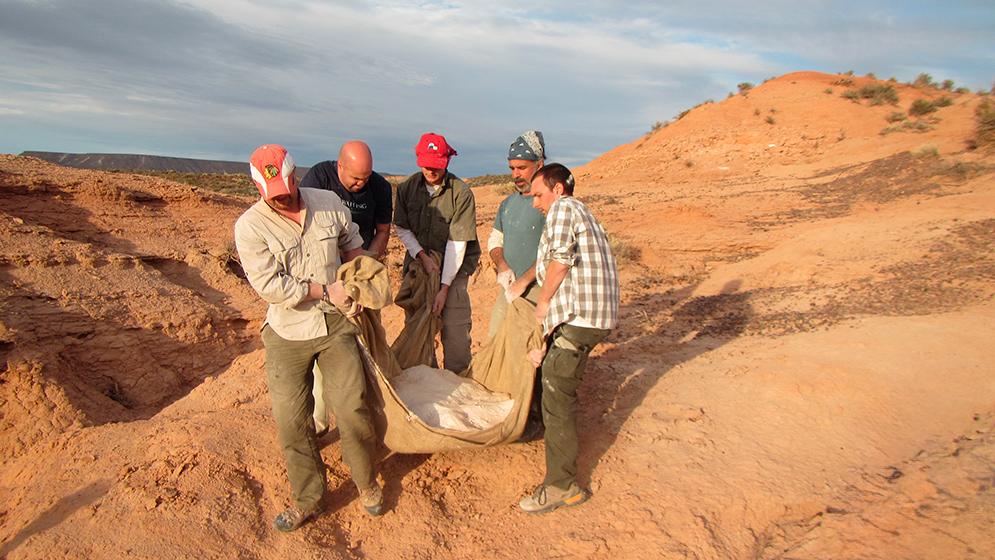
Collection of the referred specimen, MPCA Pv 377, in the Candeleros Formation

Alnashetri is known from two specimens. The holotype MPCA-477 contains the articulated hind limbs of a single individual, which includes a partial left femur, distal portions of left and right tibiae, right fibula, proximal tarsals of both ankles, a nearly complete right metatarsus, proximal and distal parts of the left metapodials and left pedal digit III. The specimen was collected at the "Hoyada de los esfenodontes" sublocality, part of the main fossiliferous locality of La Buitrera, about 30 km south of the village of El Chocόn in 2005. A more complete skeleton was discovered in 2014 and described in 2026. The specimens were recovered from massive red sandstones that form the upper part of the Candeleros Formation of the Rio Limay Subgroup, close to its border with the Huincul Formation. It comes from the lower levels of the outcrops in this region, which produces a rich fauna of small vertebrates, including specimens of the large rhynchocephalian Priosphenodon avelesi, the basal snake Najash rionegrina, the notosuchian Araripesuchus buitreraensis, the unenlagiine dromaeosaurid Buitreraptor gonzalezorum, and also mammals and pterosaurs. Originally suggested to be the Cenomanian age of the Late Cretaceous, the maximum depositional age of both the Candeleros Formation and the overlying Huincul Formation is re-dated to the early Albian by Maniel et al. (2026), approximately 111.4 ± 1.1 Ma and 106.2 ± 1.0 Ma respectively.

== Etymology ==
Alnashetri was first described and named by Peter J. Makovicky, Sebastián Apesteguía, and Federico A. Gianechini in 2012 and the type species is Alnashetri cerropoliciensis. The generic name is derived from the Günün-a-kunna dialect of the Tehuelche language, meaning "slender thighs" in reference to long and slender hind limbs of the holotype. The specific name cerropoliciensis honors the nearby small village of Cerro Policía for the generous assistance from its residents in fieldwork efforts at La Buitrera locality since its discovery in 1999.

== Description ==
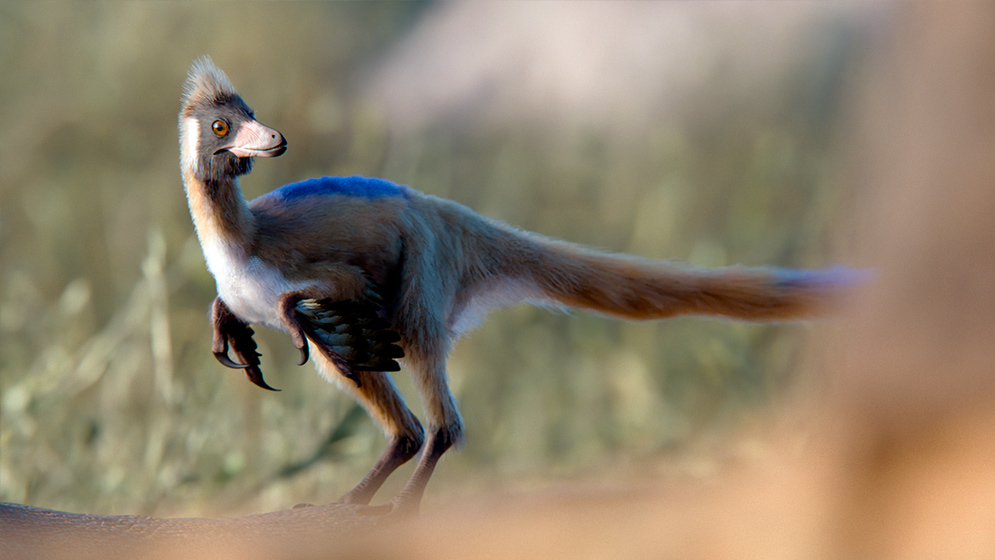
Life restoration

Alnashetri is a small non-avian coelurosaur. It can be differentiated from all other coelurosaurs in the possession of a low ridge on the distal end of the tibia, which separates the rostral surface for articulation with the astragalus from the outer face of the lateral malleolus and which extends up the shaft of the tibia dorsal to the tip of the ascending process of the astragalus. Further autapomorphy (distinctive trait) of Alnashetri is the presence of small notches extending ventrally from the collateral ligament pits at the base of the distal articular hemicondyles on phalanges III-2 and III-3. Alnashetri can be easily distinguished from Buitreraptor, the only other known small theropod from La Buitrera.

== Phylogeny ==
Although Alnashetri was a coelurosaur, as shown by the fragmentary nature of the holotype skeleton, it lacks synapomorphies that would allow unambiguous referral to a particular coelurosaurian clade. Therefore, its phylogenetic position was initially tested in a cladistic matrix used to widely explore coelurosaurian interrelationships. This preliminary analysis found Alnashetri to nest within Alvarezsauroidea. Eight characters with relevance for Alnashetri or for alvarezsaurid relationships and four recently described alvarezsauroids were added to the matrix. In this analysis, Alnashetri was recovered as a basal alvarezsaurid, in a polytomy with other alvarezsaurids from the Neuquén Basin. The evidence supporting this relationship originates in the detailed anatomy of the ankle, however, and this concentration of character support within a single anatomical region may create false results. The cladogram below shows Alnashetri phylogenetic position among other alvarezsaurids following Makovicky, Apesteguía and Gianechini (2012).

- Alvarezsauridae
  - Alvarezsaurus calvoi
  - - Alnashetri cerropoliciensis
    - Bonapartenykus ultimus
    - Patagonykus puertai
    - - Linhenykus monodactylus
      - - - Albinykus baatar
          - Xixianykus zhangi
        - - Mononykus olecranus
          - Shuvuuia deserti

Meso et al. (2024) recovered Alnashetri in a more basal position within Alvarezsauroidea, more derived than Xiyunykus and Bannykus of Early Cretaceous China, but outside of the more exclusive family Alvarezsauridae. A second, nearly complete specimen described by Makovicky et al. in 2026 supported this claim. Their phylogenetic analyses recovered Alnashetri among the basalmost alvarezsauroids, diverging after Aorun and an unnamed form from the Morrison Formation of the United States.
