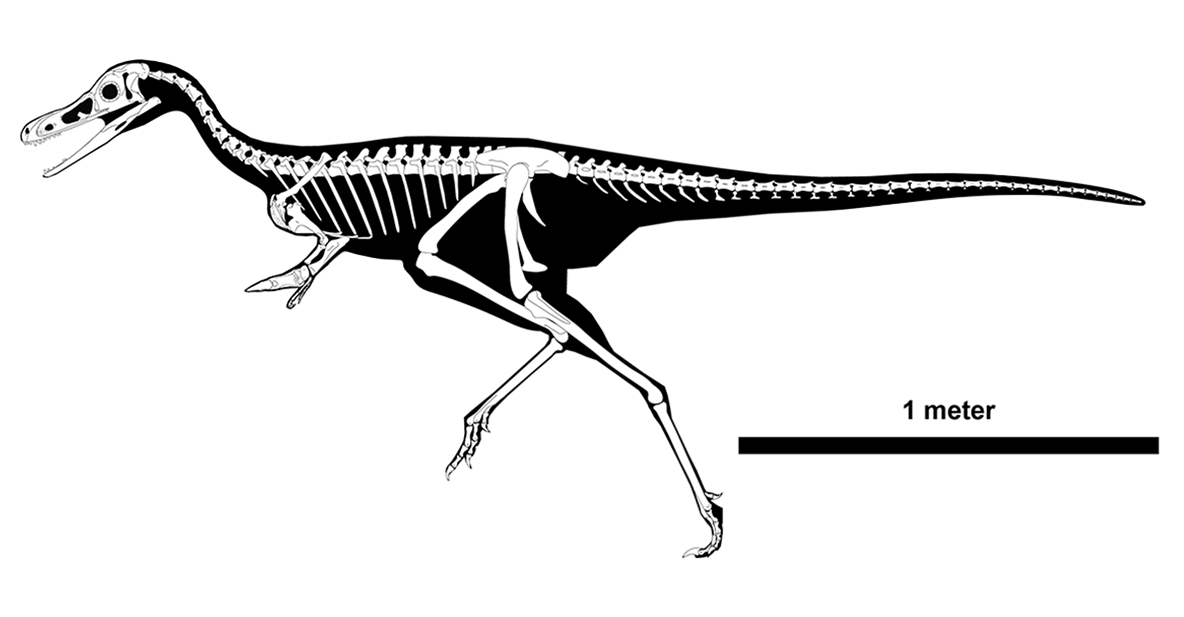
- Skeletal reconstruction based on specimen MPCN-PV 738

Scientific classification
- Kingdom: Animalia
- Phylum: Chordata
- Class: Reptilia
- Clade: Dinosauria
- Clade: Saurischia
- Clade: Theropoda
- Superfamily: †Alvarezsauroidea
- Clade: †Patagonykinae
- Genus: †Bonapartenykus; Agnolin et al. 2012
- Species: †B. ultimus

Binomial name
- †Bonapartenykus ultimus Agnolin et al. 2012

= Bonapartenykus =

Bonapartenykus Temporal range: Late Cretaceous, middle Campanian–lower Maastrichtian

Genus of alvarezsaurid dinosaurs

Bonapartenykus (meaning "José F. Bonaparte's claw") is an extinct genus of alvarezsauroid dinosaur that lived during the Late Cretaceous (Campanian–Maastrichtian) of what is now the Allen Formation of the Río Negro Province, Argentina. The genus contains a single species, Bonapartenykus ultimus, known from a partially articulated, incomplete skeleton that was found in close association to two incomplete eggs and several clusters of eggshells belonging to the oogenus Arriagadoolithus. Bonapartenykus was named in 2012. It has an estimated length of 2.5–3.3 m (8.2–10.8 ft) and weight of 43–72 kg (95–159 lb), making it the largest member of the clade Alvarezsauroidea. Additional skeletons referrable to this genus have subsequently been described.

== Discovery and naming ==
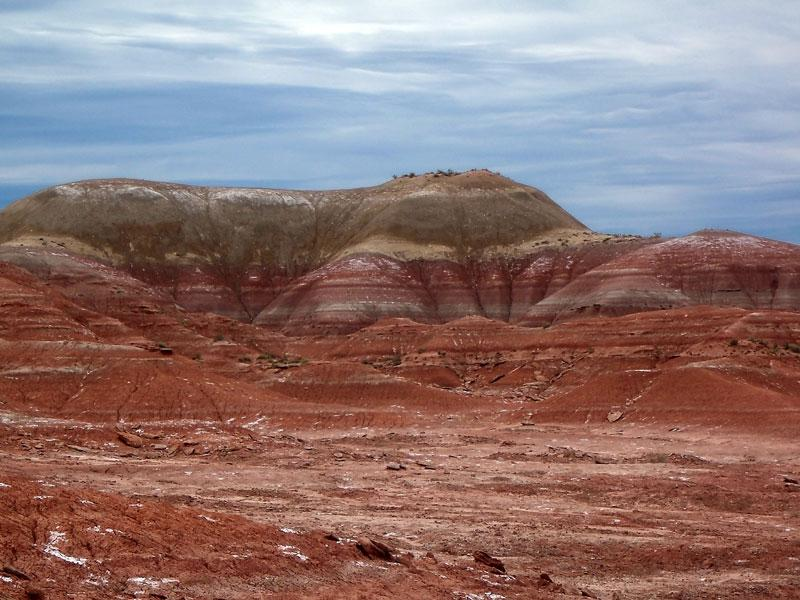
Outcrops of the Allen Formation in Argentina

A partial skeleton of a theropod with eggs was collected in a surface of approximately 30 m^{2} in fluvial sandstones of the upper Allen Formation in northwestern Patagonia, Argentina. The locality has also produced specimens of hadrosaurids, ankylosaurs, several titanosaur sauropods, several abelisaurids, indeterminate tetanurans, an incomplete large alvarezsaurid and a large unenlagiid. The skeleton was originally reported and described by Salgado et al. (2009) as an indeterminate alvarezsaurid. The specimen was later redescribed and named in 2012 by Federico L. Agnolin, Jaime E. Powell, Fernando E. Novas and Martin Kundrát. The holotype specimen, MPCA, 1290, consists of a mid-dorsal vertebra, both scapulocoracoids, left tibia and femur, left pubis articulated with the pubic peduncle of the ilium, the anterior blade of the left ilium, and two partially preserved eggs that were separated from the holotype by less than 20 cm (7.9 inches). Two specimens were referred to Bonapartenykus: MGPIFD-GR 166 and MGPIFD-GR 184, a blade of the left scapula, a left coracoid, a distal right pubis, four cervical vertebrae and a single caudal vertebra which all belong to the same individual.

The eggs of Bonapartenykus were considered unique enough for them to be given a new parataxonomic name, Arriagadoolithus, which was classified in a new oofamily, the Arriagadoolithidae, so named for the owner of the site where the discovery was made.

The generic name, Bonapartenykus, is derived from the Argentinean paleontologist José F. Bonaparte and the Latin word "onykus" (claw). The specific name, ultimus, is derived from the Latin word "ultimus" (latest), as it is one of the geologically youngest alvarezsaurids from South America.

In 2025, Meso and colleagues described various alvarezsaurid material first reported in the late 2000s from the same formation, specifically within the Salitral Ojo de Agua locality, as cf. Bonapartenykus ultimus.

== Description ==
=== Size and distinguishing traits ===
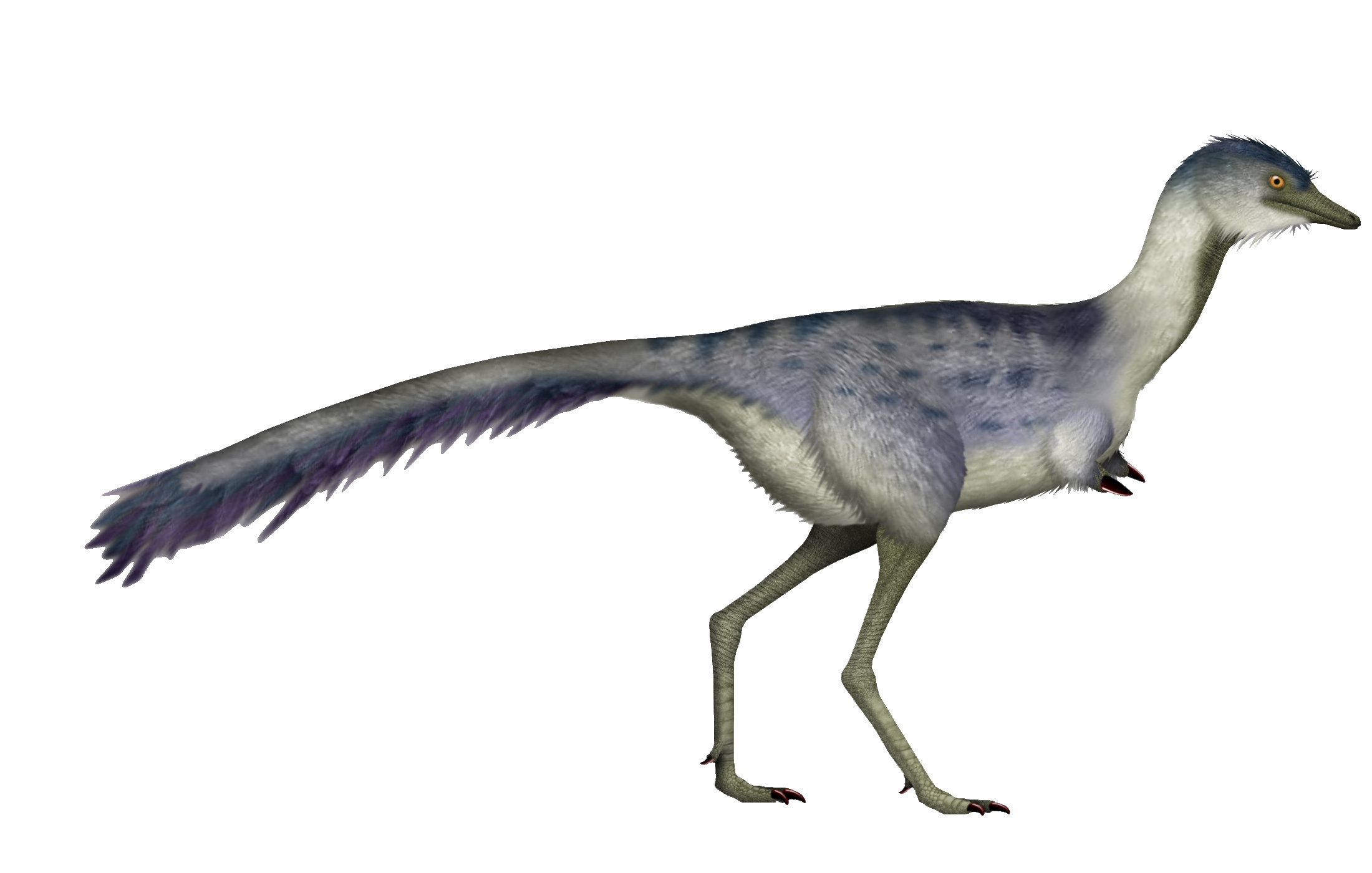
Reconstruction of Bonapartenykus

Bonapartenykus was a large alvarezsaur, measuring 2.5–3.3 m (8.2–10.8 ft) long and weighing 43–72 kg (95–159 lb).

Bonapartenykus can be distinguished from other alvarezsauroids based on the presence of spinopostzygapophyseal laminae that end abruptly above the postzygapophyses of the mid-dorsal vertebrae; the underside portion of the coracoid being strongly deflected towards the middle and decorated with delicate but abundant grooves as in Xixianykus; fused scapulocoracoids as in Ceratonykus; scapula with a very wide notch on the posterior margin of the bone; and a fused ilium and pubis. Other autapomorphies of the taxon include an enlarged ischial peduncle of the pubis and the presence of a concave triangular surface located medially on the distal pubic shaft.

=== Postcrania ===
The mid-dorsal vertebrae has diapophyses and parapophyses that are worn, with the former lacking its distal ends. As in other alvarezsaurids, the centrum of the mid-dordsal vertebrae lack pleurocoels. Unlike Haplocheirus and Patagonykus, the centrum has a cranial articular surface that is deeply concave with a sharp bony margin that surrounds it, which might be procoelous. The neural spine is proportionally taller than in Mononykini, but also resembles the condition seen in basal alvarezsauroids such as Haplocheirus. As in Mononykus and Patagonykus, both the prespinal and postspinal fossae are very deep. A unique feature of Bonapartenykus is the spinopostzygapophyseal laminae ending abruptly above the rear margin of the postzygapophyses. The mid-dorsal vertebrae has neural canals that are wide and prezygapophyses that shows a subcircular contour and a shallow concavity at its caudal margin. As in Patagonykus, the parapophyses connect to the margins of the cranial articular surface through a small ridge and the diapophyses connect to the parapophyses by a deep ridge. The centrodiapophyseal lamina was craniocaudally wider than in other alvarezsaurids, based on the preserved portions. The postzygapophyses are ellipsoidal in contour in dorsal view and show a notched caudal margin. The postzygapophyses are transversely wide and craniocaudally shortened, but lacks a lateroventral projection.

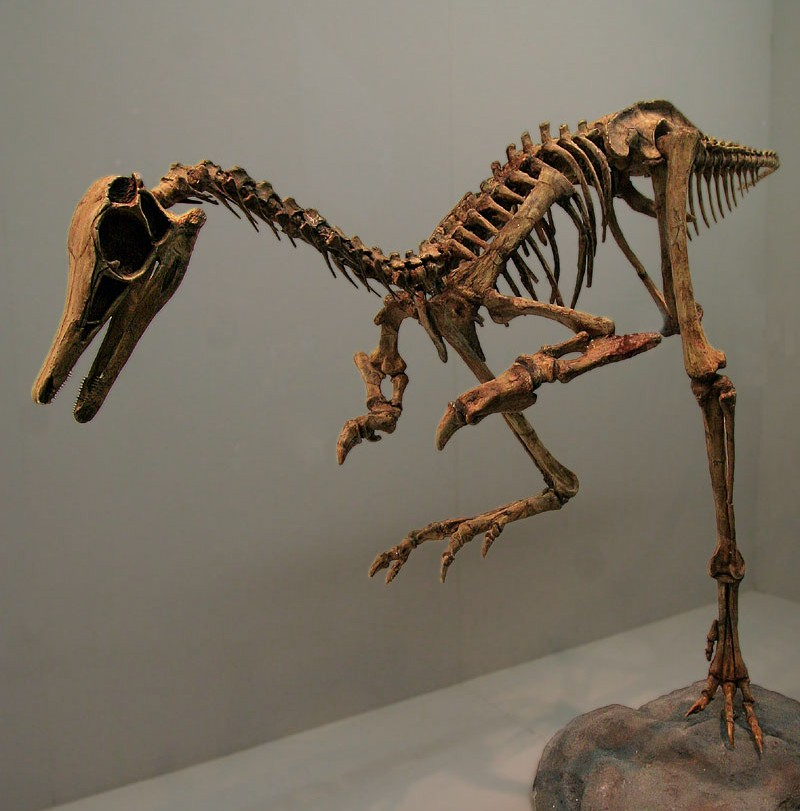
Reconstructed skeleton of the closely related Patagonykus

As in Alvarezsaurus, the scapular blade is medially deflected, unlike other alvarezsaurids that have a straight scapular blade. However, as in other alvarezsaurids, both the cranial and caudal margins are almost parallel. Along the caudal margin of the scapular blade is a well-developed notch. As in Maniraptora, Oviraptorosauria and other Alvarezsauridae, the acromion is subtriangular in shape. The glenoid fossa is oriented towards the posterior and sides, with the scapular portion being lateromedially expanded and wider than the coracoidal portion, as well as perpendicular to the main axis of the coracoid. Similar to Paraves, the ventral half of the coracoid is strongly medially flexed. The coracoid lacks a bicipital tubercle and is transversely thick at the cranial margin. The coracoidal foramen is wide and rounded in contour, and possesses several ridges near the caudal margin which may correspond to muscle attachment points. Along the side margins of the coracoid are a smooth surface towards the sides and upper side and a directed margin towards the middle and underside. This feature is similar in condition to that of Patagonykus but differs by the middle portion of the coracoid not being as strongly inflected towards and the surface of the side show only isolated and poorly developed grooves. The faintly defined ridge of Ceratonykus is very poorly and is restricted to the posterior end of the coracoid which is unlike that of Bonapartenykus. Agnolin et al. (2012) noted that the ventral half of the coracoid is deflected towards the middle, with an extremely thin medial rear that is slightly wrapping upwards which probably correlates with some kind of skin cornification, but does not correlate with a cornified sheath due to the absence of oblique neurovascular foramina. The coracoid is extremely elongate and ends at an acute end which restricted articulation with the sternum. Alvarezsaurids like Bonapartenykus may have had a flat and wide breast based on a combination of characteristics like a continuous subhorizontal surface with formed by the medial deflection of the coracoids with the sternal plate.

Unlike Patagonykus, the pubic shaft of Bonapartenykus is more compressed towards the sides and narrower from front to back. As in derived alvarezsaurids, the pubic shaft lacks the caudal sulcus for the ischial articulation. The distal end of the pubic shaft possesses a small ridge on its cranial margin, which is absent in more derived alvarezsaurids, but shows a distal pubic boot on the pubis. The pubic boot appears to be rounded in side view on the rear margin. A small portion of the right ilium is preserved. The pubic pedicle is compressed towards the middle and sides. The pubic pedicle is also strongly fused with the pubis, which is a characteristic unique among alvarezsaurids, along with a reduced cuppedicus fossa. The cuppedicus fossa is shallow and elongate with a low, wide, and smooth ridge being present above it. The femoral head was separated from the greater trochanter by a cleft as indicated by the base of the cranial trochanter. The femoral head was similar in general size and proportions to Patagonykus. In lateral view, a large, sculptured bulge is present on the femur, which may correspond to muscle attachment points. The tibia is very short and robust, while the tibial shaft is bowed towards the sides. Towards the sides of the base of the cnemial crest, a small bump is present and the distal end is strongly scraped by friction or erosion.

== Classification ==
In their phylogenetic analyses, Agnolin et al. (2012) originally placed Bonapartenykus within Alvarezsauridae, within the clade Patagonykinae as sister taxon to Patagonykus. Other analyses by Averianov & Lopatin in 2022 similarly recovered it as the sister taxon to Patagonykus, albeit outside of Alvarezsauridae. However, Xu et al. (2018) and subsequent analyses using their dataset recovered it as a non-alvarezsaurid alvarezsauroid, more basal than Patagonykus and Achillesaurus.

In their 2025 description of bones they referred to Bonapartenykus, Meso et al. recovered it as a patagonykine within the Alvarezsauridae, similar to the initial description by Agnolin et al. (2012). Their results are displayed in the cladogram below:

- Alvarezsauria
  - Shishugounykus
  - Aorun
  - - Haplocheirus
    - - Bannykus
      - - Xiyunykus
        - Tugulusaurus
      - Alvarezsauridae
        - Alvarezsaurus
        - Patagonykinae
          - Patagonykus
          - - MPCN-PV 738 (cf. Bonapartenykus)
            - Bonapartenykus
        - Parvicursorinae
          - Ceratonykus
          - - Khulsanurus
            - - Qiupanykus
              - - Dzharaonyx
                - - - Linhenykus
                    - Parvicursor
                  - - Shuvuuia
                    - - Mononykus
                      - - Kol
                        - - Ondogurvel
                          - Albinykus
                          - Xixianykus

== Paleoenvironment ==
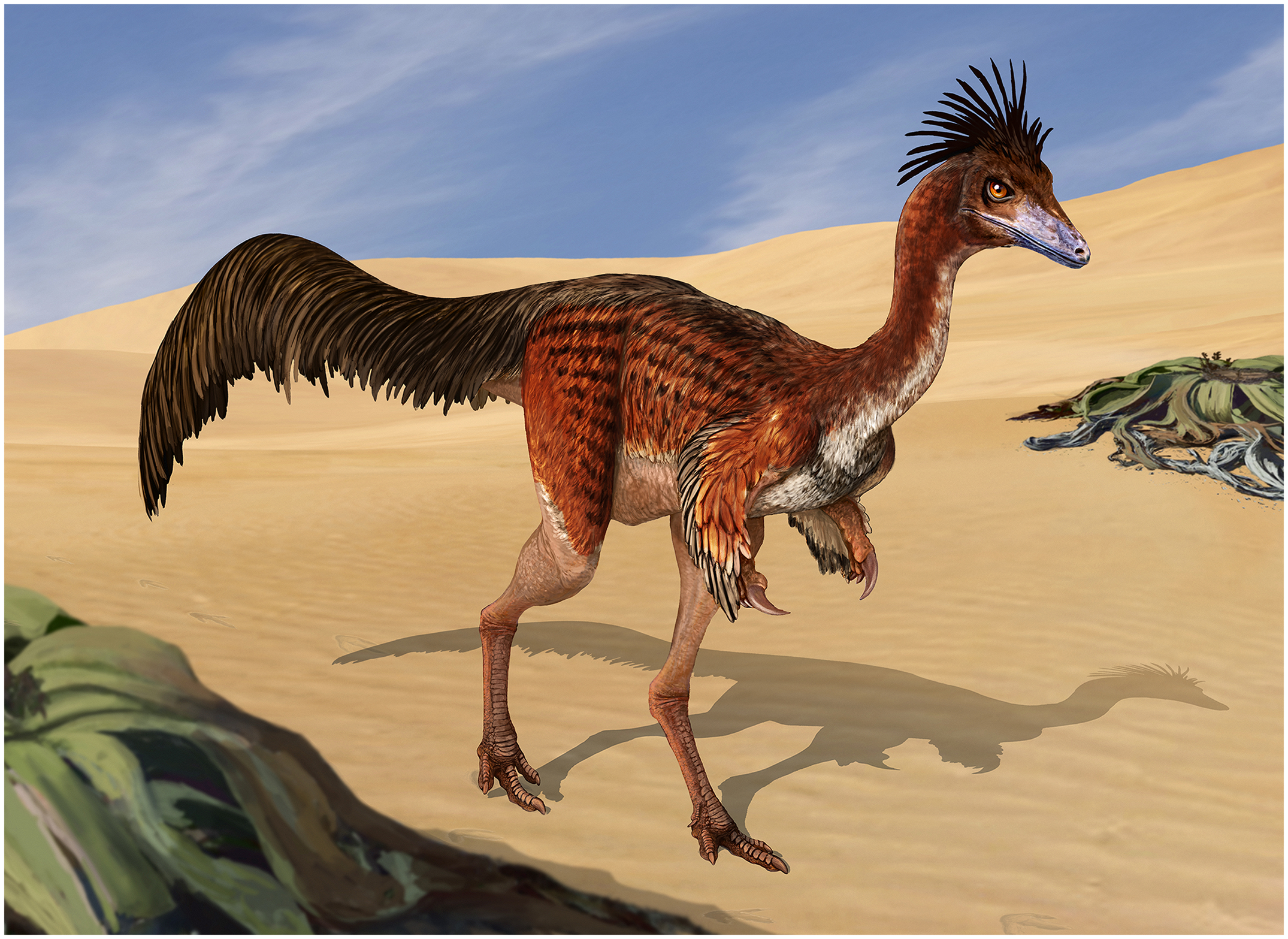
Speculative life restoration of Bonapartenykus

Bonapartenykus is known from fluvial sandstones of the upper Allen Formation which have been dated to the Campanian to Maastrichtian stages of the Late Cretaceous period. The Allen Formation represents a range of environments such as ephemeral lacustrine, aeolian and fluvial systems to coastal marine environments that developed into estuaries and tidal flats. In 2015, Armas and Sánchez described the relationship of the coastal environment with wind systems of the Allen Formation and concluded the formation represents a hybrid coastal system of tidal flats with a large storm influence in some areas linked to aeolian systems.

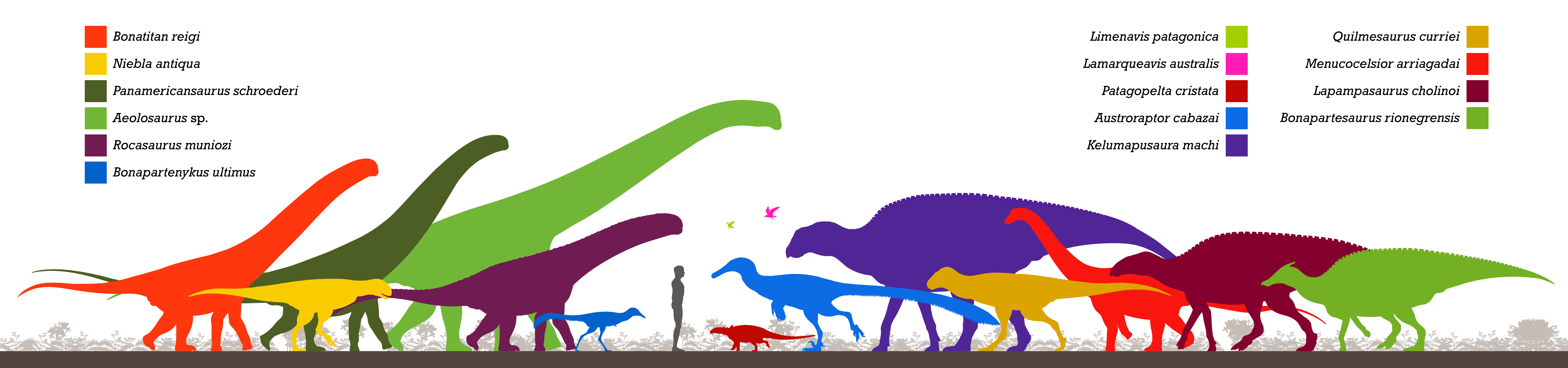
Dinosaur fauna of the Allen Formation (Bonapartenykus in blue, center left)

The fauna of the Allen Formation consists of the titanosaur sauropods Bonatitan, Menucocelsior, Panamericansaurus, Rocasaurus and an indeterminate species of Aeolosaurus, the hadrosaurid ornithopods Bonapartesaurus, Kelumapusaura, Lapampasaurus and Willinakaqe, the nodosaurid Patagopelta, the abelisaurid theropods Niebla and Quilmesaurus, the large unenlagiid paravian Austroraptor, the avialans Lamarqueavis and Limenavis, the azhdarchid pterosaur Aerotitan, the rhynchocephalian Lamarquesaurus, and the plesiosaur Kawanectes.
