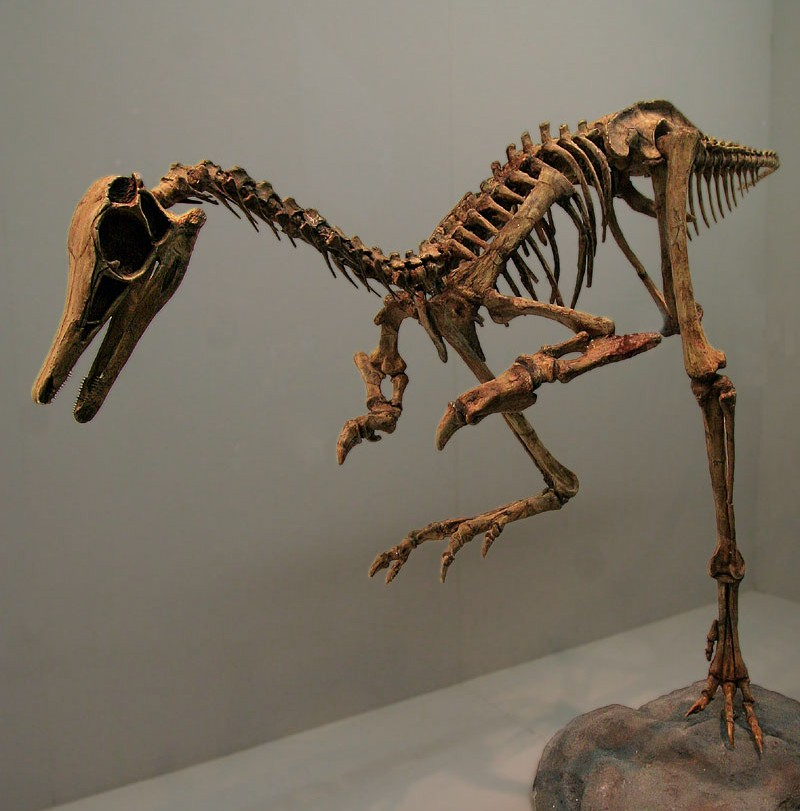
- Reconstructed skeleton

Scientific classification
- Kingdom: Animalia
- Phylum: Chordata
- Class: Reptilia
- Clade: Dinosauria
- Clade: Saurischia
- Clade: Theropoda
- Superfamily: †Alvarezsauroidea
- Clade: †Patagonykinae
- Genus: †Patagonykus; Novas, 1996
- Species: †P. puertai

Binomial name
- †Patagonykus puertai Novas, 1996

= Patagonykus =

Patagonykus Temporal range: Turonian-Early Coniacian ~90.5–88.5 Ma

Extinct genus of dinosaurs

Patagonykus (meaning "Patagonian claw") is a genus of alvarezsauroid theropod dinosaur from the Upper Cretaceous of Argentina. It was discovered in exposures of the Portezuelo Formation (Turonian-Coniacian) of the Rio Neuquén Subgroup in the Neuquén Basin, Neuquén Province. The holotype consists of an incomplete but well-preserved skeleton, lacking a skull, but including many vertebrae, the coracoids, a partial forelimb, pelvic girdle, and hindlimbs. Patagonykus has been classed with the Alvarezsauridae, a family which includes such taxa as the Mongolian Mononykus and the also Argentinian Alvarezsaurus. In 2010, Gregory S. Paul estimated its length at 1 meter (3.3 ft) and its weight at 3.5 kilograms (7.7 lb).

== Classification ==
Agnolin et al. (2012) originally placed Patagonykus within Alvarezsauridae, within the clade Patagonykinae as sister taxon to Bonapartenykus. Makovicky, Apesteguía and Gianechini (2012) found it to be in a polytomy with Alnashetri, Bonapartenykus, and a clade containing more deeply nested taxa such as Linhenykus, Mononykus and Albinykus. However, Xu et al. (2018) positioned it as a basal Alvarezsauroidea, sister taxon to Patagonykus and Achillesaurus, which was also recovered by Fowler et al. (2020). Patagonykus has also been recovered as sister taxon to Bonapartenykus and Alvarezsauridae by Qin et al. (2019), and sister taxon to only Patagonykus outside of Alvarezsauridae by Averianov & Lopatin (2022a) and Averianov & Lopatin (2022b).

A phylogenetic analysis conducted by Fowler et al. (2020) is reproduced below.

- Alvarezsauroidea
  - Aorun
  - - Haplocheirus
    - - - Tugulusaurus
        - Xiyunykus
      - - Bannykus
        - - Bonapartenykus
          - - Patagonykus
            - - Achillesaurus
              - Alvarezsauridae
                - Alvarezsaurus
                - - Albertonykus
                  - Parvicursorinae
                    - Shuvuuia
                    - Ceratonykus
                    - Kol
                    - Linhenykus
                    - Mononykus
                    - Trierarchuncus
                    - Parvicursor
                    - Albinykus
                    - Xixianykus

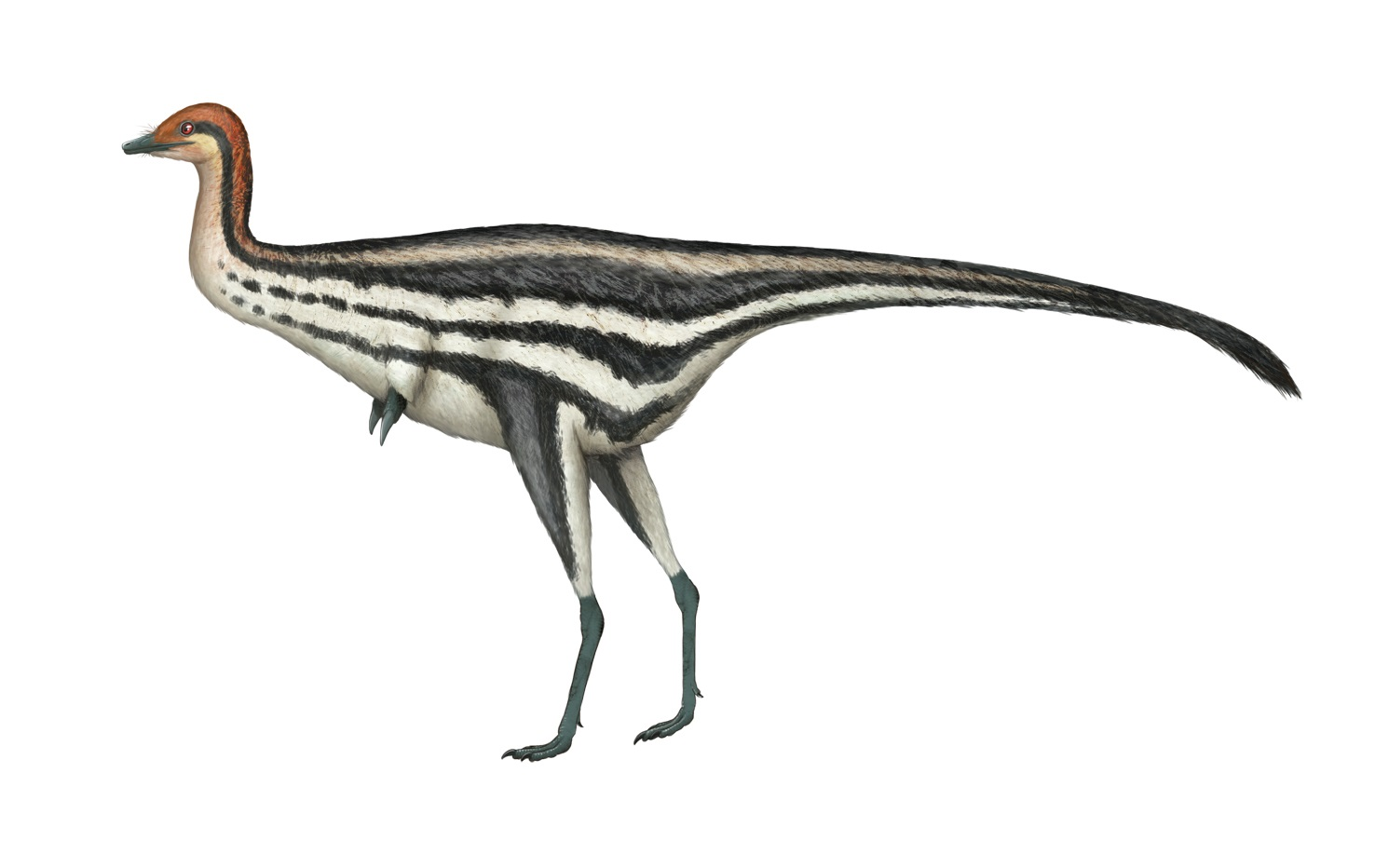
Reconstruction

The results of an earlier analysis by Agnolin et al. (2012) are reproduced below.

- Alvarezsauridae
  - Patagonykinae
    - Patagonykus
    - Bonapartenykus
  - unnamed
    - Alvarezsaurus
    - Parvicursorinae
      - Ceratonykini
        - Ceratonykus
        - Xixianykus
        - Albinykus
      - - Parvicursor
        - Mononykini
          - - Albertonykus
            - Mononykus
          - - Linhenykus
            - Shuvuuia
