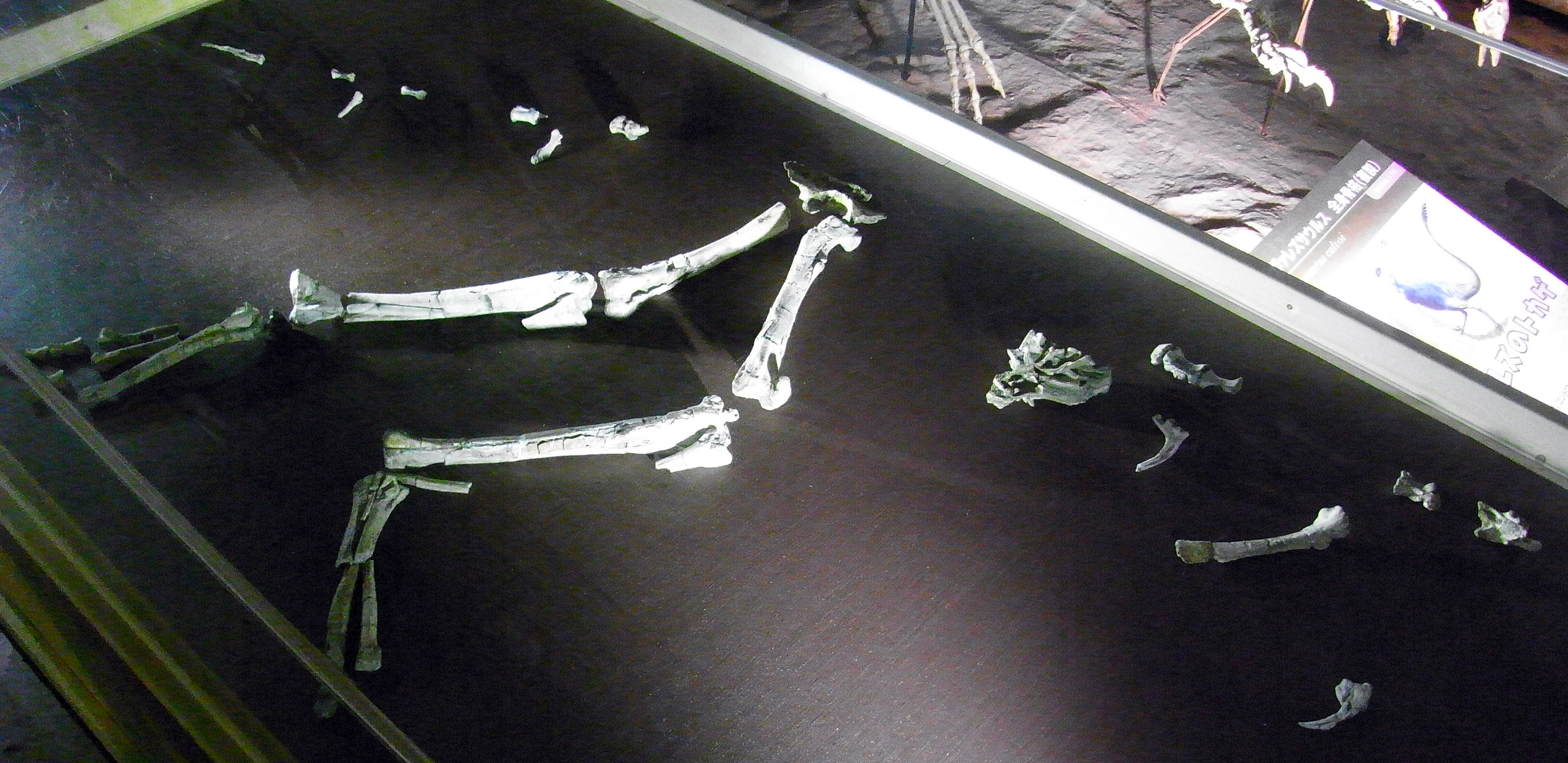
- Holotype displayed in Japan in 2012

Scientific classification
- Kingdom: Animalia
- Phylum: Chordata
- Class: Reptilia
- Clade: Dinosauria
- Clade: Saurischia
- Clade: Theropoda
- Superfamily: †Alvarezsauroidea
- Genus: †Bannykus; Xu et al., 2018

Type species
- †Bannykus wulatensis Xu et al., 2018

Synonyms
- Wulatesaurus (informal)

= Bannykus =

Bannykus Temporal range: Early Cretaceous, 125–113 Ma

Extinct genus of dinosaur

Bannykus is an extinct monotypic genus of alvarezsauroid from the Early Cretaceous Bayin-Gobi Formation of Inner Mongolia, China. It includes one species, Bannykus wulatensis.

== Discovery ==
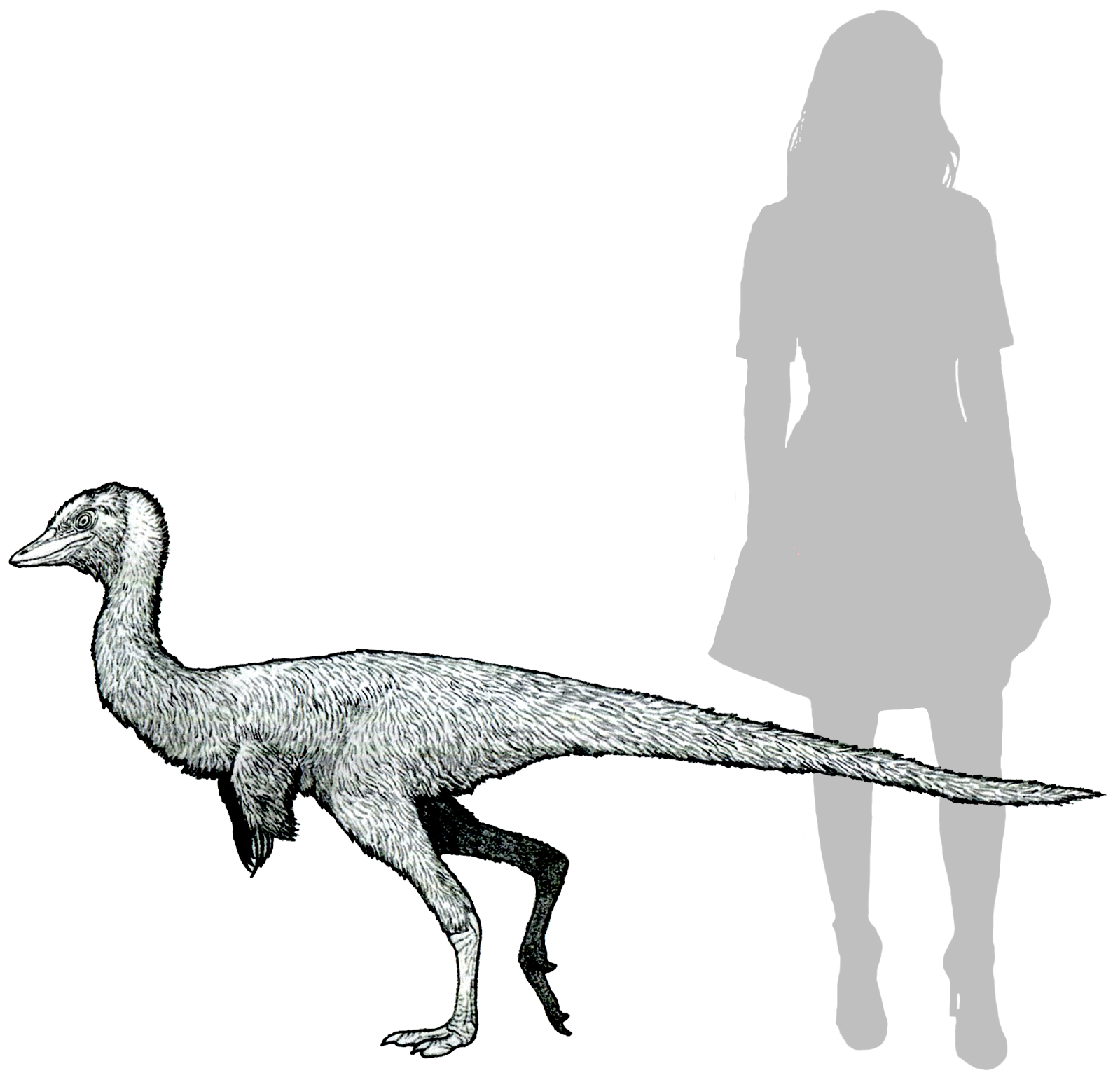
Scaled reconstruction

The holotype of Bannykus wulatensis is IVPP V25026, a partially-articulated incomplete skeleton of an 8 year old subadult. The holotype comes from the Bayin-Gobi Formation in Chaoge, Wulatehouqi, Inner Mongolia, China. It was discovered in 2009 and in 2012, its remains were displayed in Japan under the unofficial name "Wulatesaurus". It was given the binomial name Bannykus wulatensis in 2018; its generic name comes from the Mandarin word Ban (Chinese: 半), meaning half, and the Greek word onyx, meaning claw. This refers to the transitional characteristics seen in this theropod. The specific name refers to Wulatehouqi (Wulate Rear Banner), the county that the holotype was found in.

== Description ==
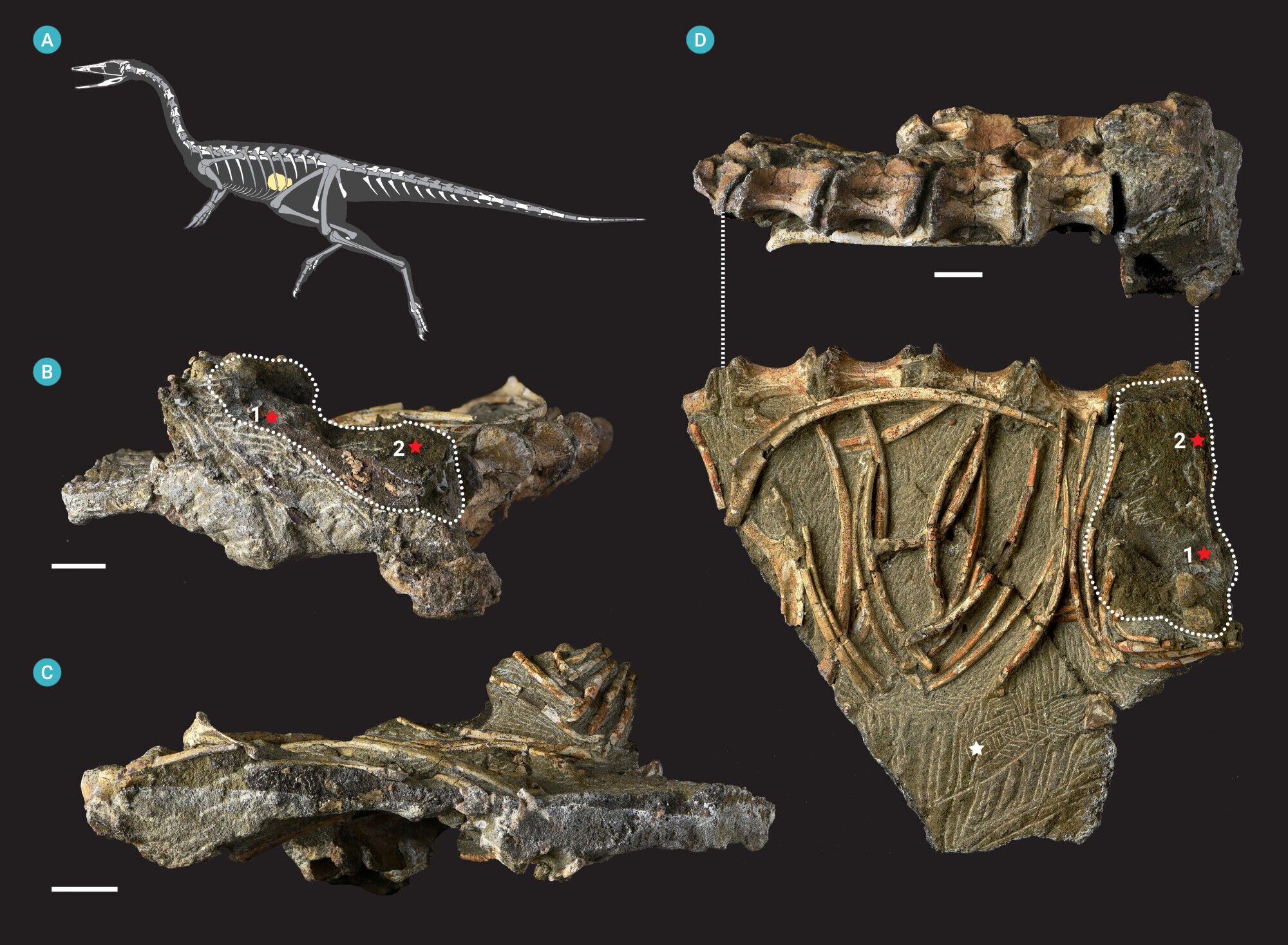
Bannykus holotype showing the intestinal contents (yellowish conglomerate)

Bannykus is large for an alvarezsaurian theropod, with an estimated length of 2.77 metres (9.1 ft) and body mass of approximately 24–30 kilograms (53–66 lb) for the immature holotype. The forelimb of Bannykus shows significant reduction and modification compared to Haplocheirus, but less shortened and specialized than later alvarezsaurs like Shuvuuia. In 2025, Wang and colleagues identified hard tissue debris and possible soft tissues in the intestinal contents of the holotype (represented by the yellowish conglomerate) based on scanning electron microscopy, which was consistent with further Raman spectroscopy analysis that detected "characteristic peaks indicative of bone-derived material", suggesting that Bannykus probably had a carnivorous diet. The authors concluded that both the forelimb reduction and the dietary shift from carnivory to probably insectivory among alvarezsaurians occurred later in their evolution.

== Classification ==
Bannykus, along with Xiyunykus, fills a 70-million year gap in alvarezsaur evolution by exhibiting morphologies intermediate between the typical theropod forelimb of Haplocheirus and the highly reduced forelimbs and minute teeth of Late Cretaceous alvarezsaurids.

The cladogram below is the latest and most comprehensive analysis of alvarezsaurian evolution, following Meso et al. (2024).

- Alvarezsauria
  - Shishugounykus inexpectus
  - - Aorun zhaoi
    - - Haplocheirus sollers
      - - - Bannykus wulatensis
          - - Xiyunykus pengi
            - Tugulusaurus faciles
        - - Alnashetri cerropoliciensis
          - Alvarezsauridae
            - - Patagonykinae
                - Bonapartenykus ultimus
                - Patagonykus puertai
              - - Achillesaurus manazzonei
                - Alvarezsaurus calvoi
            - Parvicursorinae
              - Ceratonykus oculatus
              - - Khulsanurus magnificus
                - - Qiupanykus zhangi
                  - - Dzharaonyx eski
                    - - - Linhenykus monodactylus
                        - Parvicursor remotus
                      - Mononykini
                        - Shuvuuia deserti
                        - - Mononykus olecranus
                          - - Ondogurvel alifanovi
                            - Albinykus baatar

== Palaeobiology ==
The forelimbs of Bannykus were biomechanically capable of generalised motions, and the animal likely used them for a variety of digging styles.
