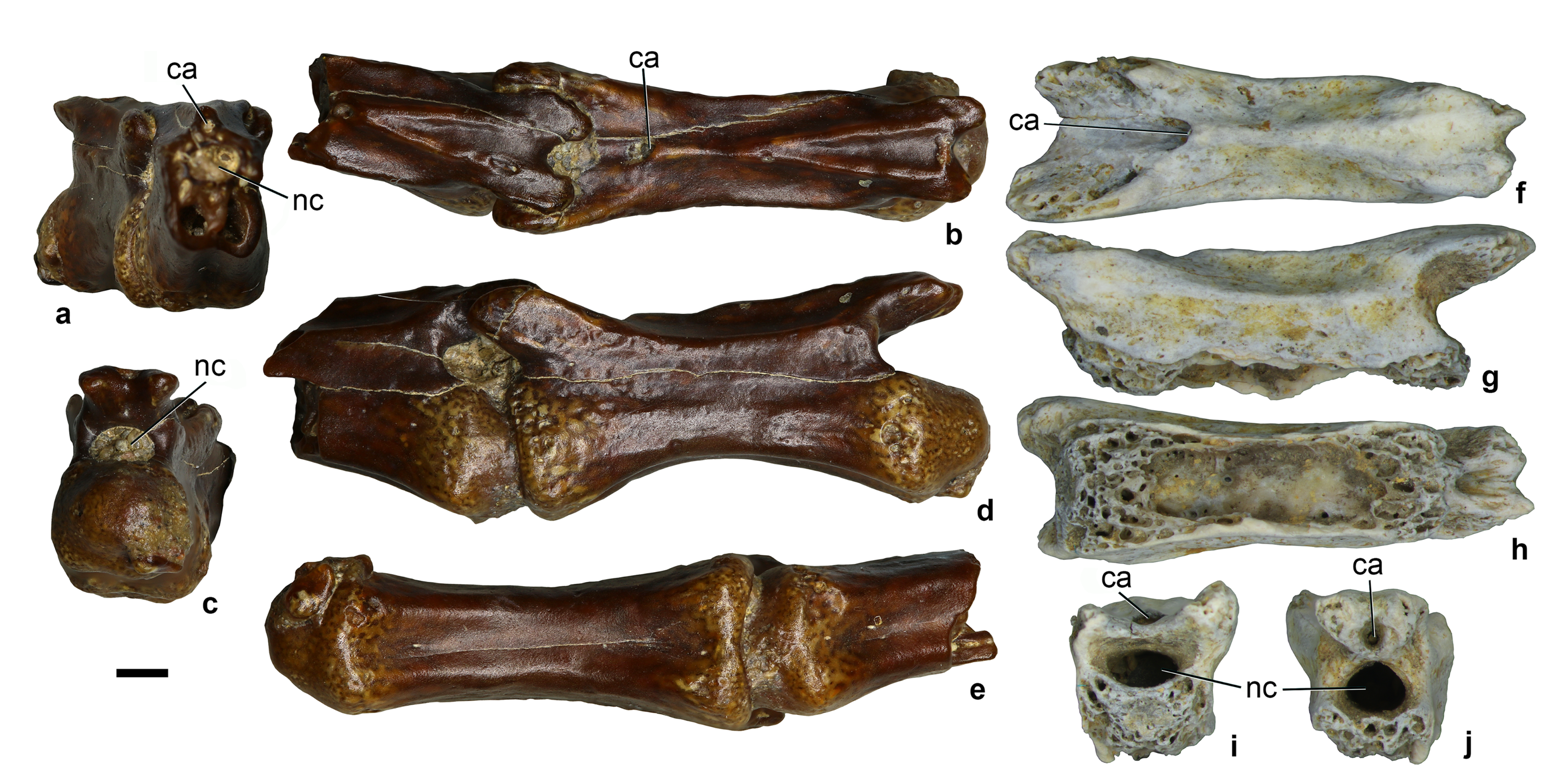

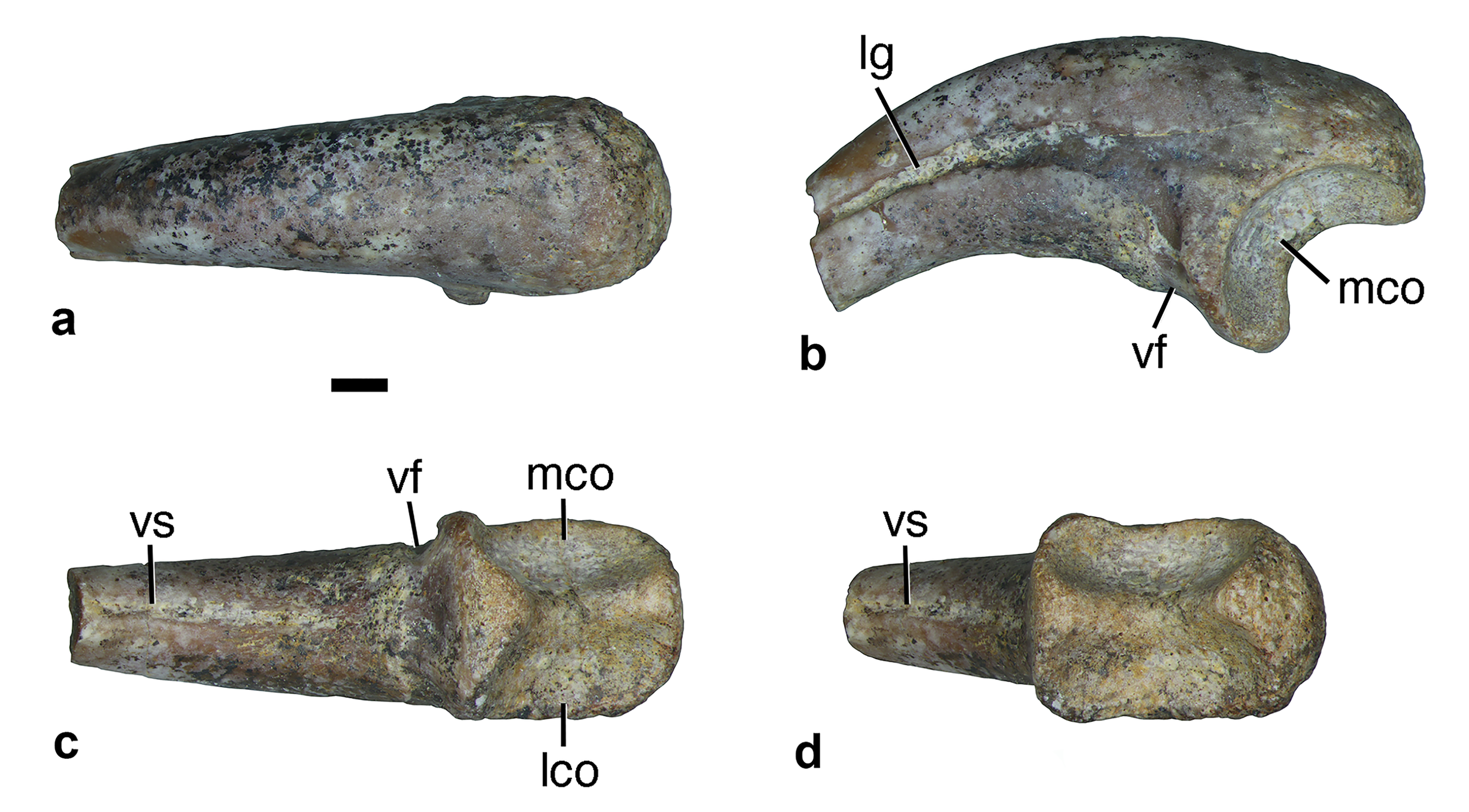
- Two caudal vertebrae (top) and a hand claw (bottom) from Dzharaonyx

Scientific classification
- Kingdom: Animalia
- Phylum: Chordata
- Class: Reptilia
- Clade: Dinosauria
- Clade: Saurischia
- Clade: Theropoda
- Family: †Alvarezsauridae
- Subfamily: †Parvicursorinae
- Genus: †Dzharaonyx; Averianov & Sues, 2022

Type species
- †Dzharaonyx eski Averianov & Sues, 2022

= Dzharaonyx =

Dzharaonyx Temporal range: Late Cretaceous, mid–late Turonian

Genus of alvarezsaurid dinosaur

Dzharaonyx (meaning "Dzharakuduk claw", named after the type locality) is a genus of alvarezsaurid theropod from the Late Cretaceous Bissekty Formation of Uzbekistan. The type and only species is D. eski. The specific epithet "eski" is an Uzbek word for "old".

== Discovery and naming ==
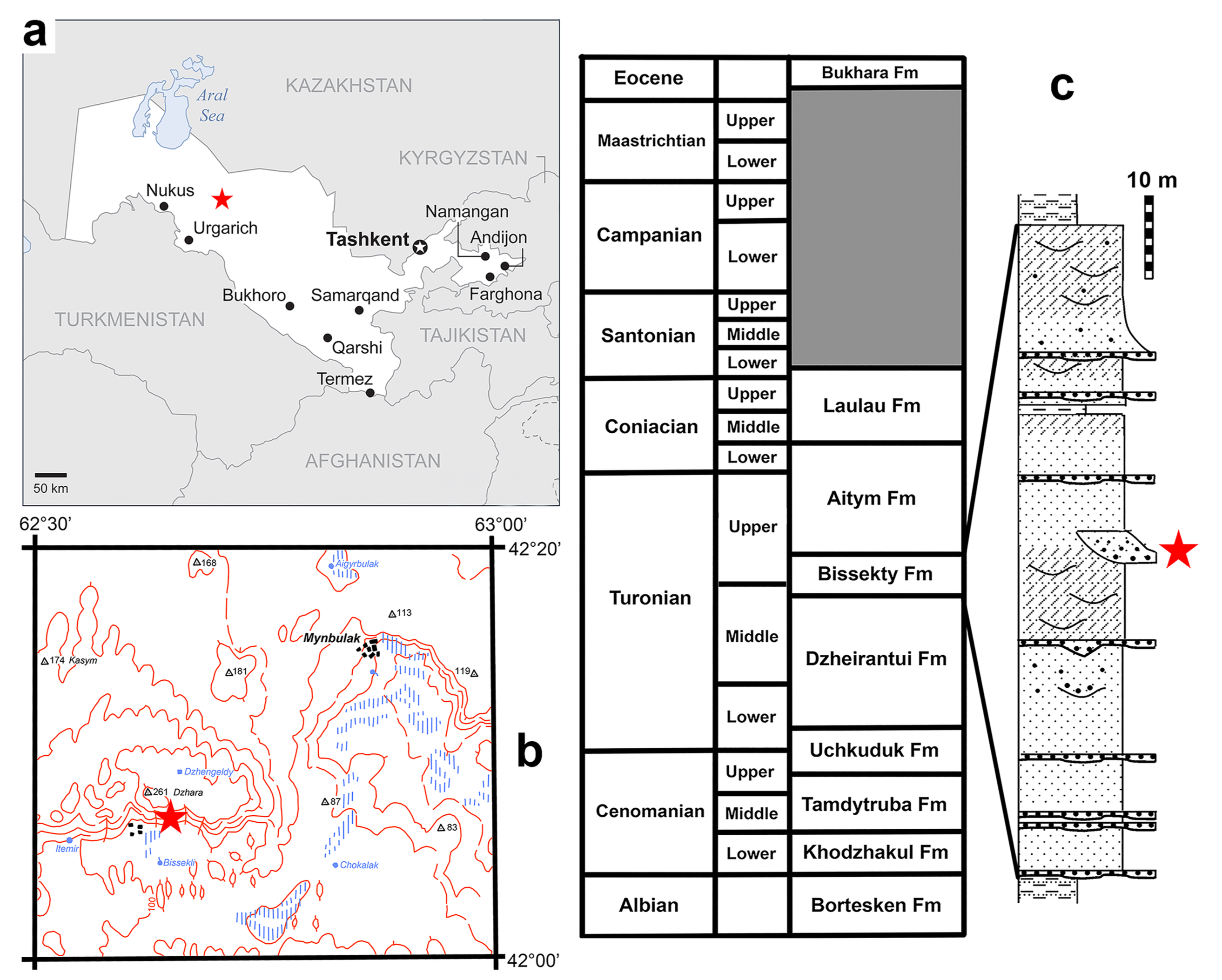
A map of the locality where Dzharaonyx was found in Uzbekistan (red star)

All remains of Dzharaonyx were discovered at a single locality called Dzharakuduk, which is in the Kyzylkum Desert of Uzbekistan. The first remains belonging to alvarezsaurid dinosaurs, which would later be referred to Dzharaonyx were discovered by Lev Nesov during the period between 1977-1994 who was a paleontologist employed by the Soviet Union. Additional remains would be found in the period between 1997-2006 by the so-called "URBAC joint-paleontological expedition", so named because it involved the collaboration of five countries — Uzbekistan, Russia, Britain, America, and Canada. During both of these periods of expedition, remains from alvarezsaurs were exceedingly rare. As of a 2017 publication, only seven bones confidently attributable to alvarezsaurs had been found out of over 3500 catalogued dinosaur fossils. These remains, in spite of being extremely fragmentary, were readily identifiable as alvarezsaurid remains because of the extremely distinctive morphology of alvarezsaur hand and tail anatomy.

Although many of the specimens which would later be referred to Dzharaonyx were described in 2017, the taxon was not fully described and given a name until 2022 when Alexander Averianov and Hans Dieter-Sues published on it. In the intervening five years, additional specimens were recovered that were eventually all referred to the new taxon Dzharaonyx in 2022. Averianov and Sues reported that there was no evidence that more than one alvarezsaurid taxon existed in the area, and so all of the remains attributable to alvarezsaurids from the Dzharakuduk locality were referred to this new genus, even though these remains were not all found in the same place.

== Description ==
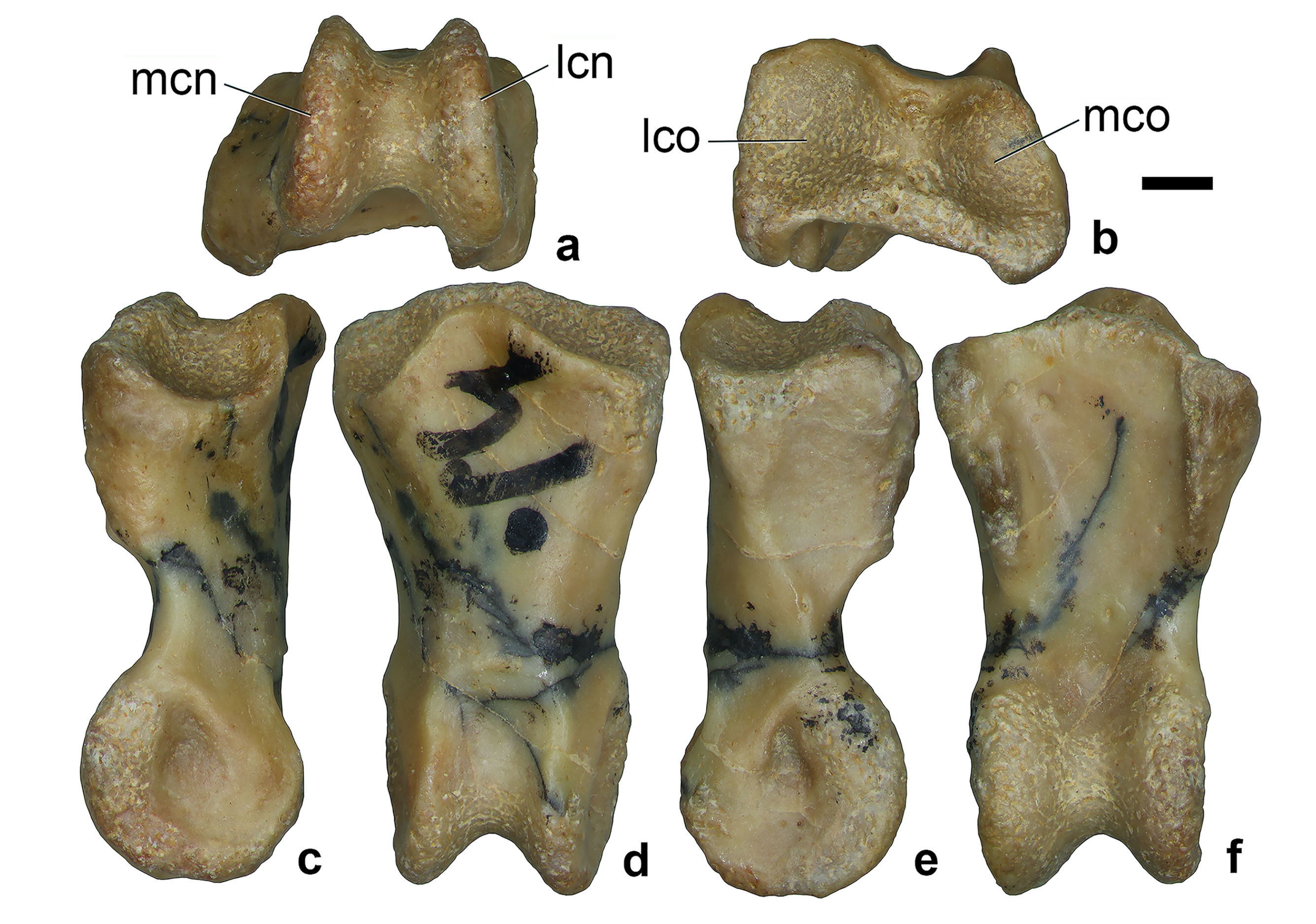
One of the large second-digit phalanges of Dzharaonyx, shown from multiple views

Dzharaonyx, like all parvicursorines, was a relatively small dinosaur. The authors of its description did not give a precise size estimate, but subsequent researchers have estimated that it was around the same size as Linhenykus at around 50 cm (1.6 ft) long and weighing around 1.75 kg (3.9 lb).

The holotype of Dzharaonyx is a single right humerus and was given the specimen number ZIN PH 2619/16. All other alvarezsaurid specimens from Dzharakuduk were made part of the hypodigm. The specimens combined comprise two series: ZIN PH 2440/16 to 2446/16 and ZIN PH 2616/16 to 2635/16. Aside from the holotype humerus, elements are represented from all parts of the skeleton (except the skull) including: one dorsal and five caudal vertebrae, two ulnae, two carpometacarpi, five phalanges from the hands, three manual unguals, two parts of the pubis, one metatarsal, four phalanges from the feet, and one toe claw.

From this collection of remains, Dzharaonyx is able to be distinguished from all other alvarezsaurids by the following autapomorphies: opisthocoelous dorsal vertebrae lacking a fossa between the zygapopyses, procoelous caudal vertebrae with a canal inside the neural arch, a small tuberosity inside the humerus, a radial condyle that protrudes outwardly, a very large olecranon process of the ulna, globular-shaped trochlea on the carpometacarpus, a lack of a process on top of the second manual phalanges, a tubercle just in front of the acetabulum, an arctometatarsus, a flange on the outside of the second metatarsal, and small flexor tubercles on the toe claws.

== Classification ==
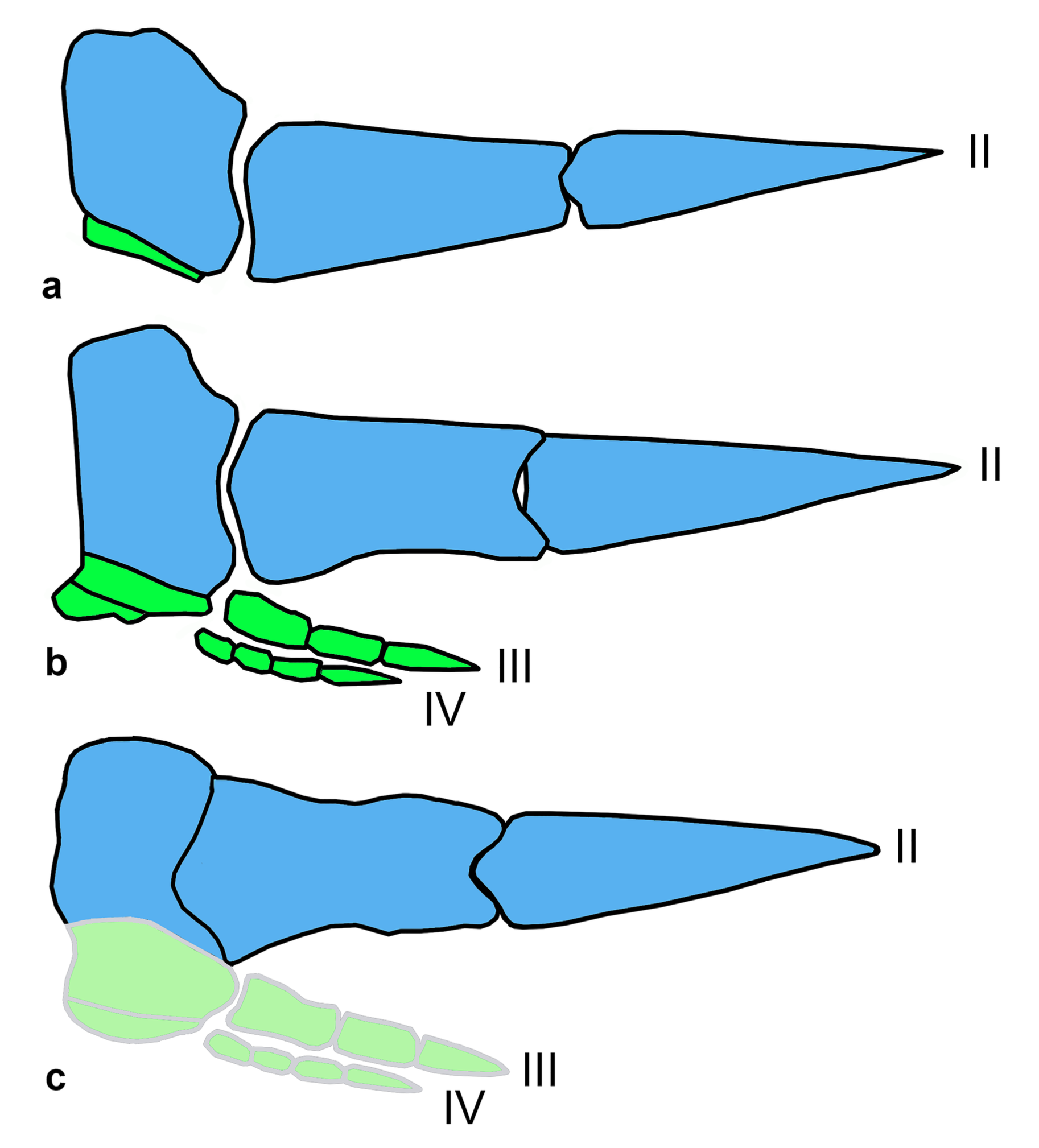
A diagram showing the evolution of the hand bones in Alvarezsauridae (Dzharaonyx depicted at the bottom)

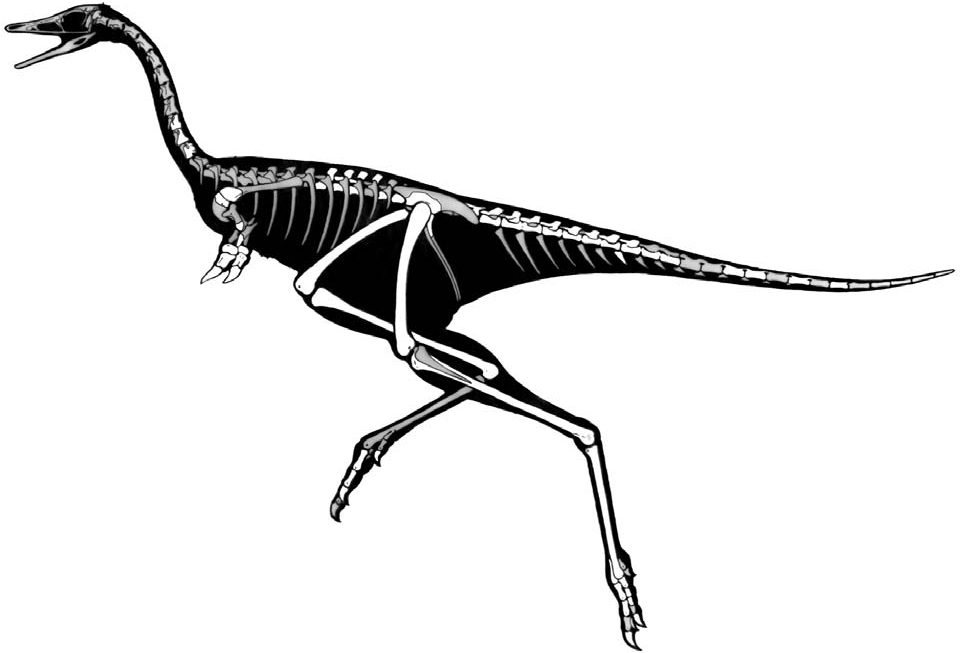

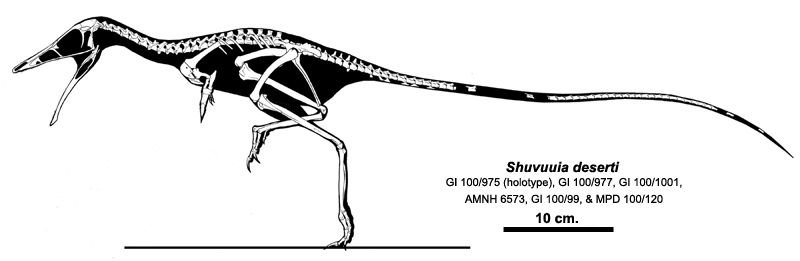
Skeletal reconstructions of Linhenykus (top) and Shuvuuia (bottom), two close relatives of Dzharaonyx

When Averianov and Sues described Dzharaonyx in 2022, they conducted a phylogenetic analysis which recovered Dzharaonyx within a monophyletic Parvicursorinae. Dzharaonyx was supported as a member of this clade by the presence of large neural canals on dorsal vertebrae and the extreme elongation of the posterior dorsal centra. Dzharaonyx therefore represents the oldest record of Parvicursorinae anywhere in the world, supporting an Asian origin for the group. The humerus of Dzharaonyx is superficially similar in shape to that of Patagonykus, but Averianov and Sues suggest that this is homoplastic and not reflective of a true close relationship, and the anatomy is very consistent between Dzharaonyx and other Asian parvicursorines.

In 2024, a team of authors led by Jorge Gustavo Meso and including the theropod researchers Diego Pol and Peter Makovicky published a study examining the evolutionary history of Alvarezsauria. They studied the biogeography, diversification, and functional morphology of these theropods throughout the Jurassic and Cretaceous periods. The phylogenetic analysis conducted by these authors reaffirmed the findings of Averianov and Sues. They found Dzharaonyx as a member of Parvicursorinae and suggested that its appearance is reflective of a "miniaturization event" within alvarezsaurian evolution that occurred during the early-to-middle Cenomanian. An abbreviated version of the cladogram produced by Meso and colleagues is shown below.

- Alvarezsauridae
  - - - Achillesaurus
      - Alvarezsaurus
    - Patagonykinae
      - Bonapartenykus
      - Patagonykus
  - Parvicursorinae
    - Ceratonykus
    - - Khulsanurus
      - - Qiupanykus
        - - Dzharaonyx
          - - - Linhenykus
              - Parvicursor
            - Mononykini
              - Shuvuuia
              - - Mononykus
                - - Albinykus
                  - Ondogurvel

== Paleoecology ==
=== Diet ===
No remains of the skull of Dzharaonyx are known, so no direct observations about its possible feeding habits can be inferred. However, the diet of derived alvarezsauroids generally has been a topic of considerable speculation. The major diversification of parvicursorines coincided with the Cretaceous Terrestrial Revolution — a major evolutionary transition that was marked by, among other things, the spread of angiosperms and the evolution of eusociality in Hymenoptera. These simultaneous developments, coupled with the unique morphology of alvarezsaurid hands, has been used to suggest that they may have been specialized to feed on colonial insects like ants.

=== Paleoenvironment ===
The lithology of the sediment in the Bissekty Formation, where Dzharaonyx lived, largely consists of cross bedded sandstones with interbeds of massive sandstone, well cemented intraformational conglomerate, siltstones and mudstones. Most of the fossils are found as clasts within the conglomerates. The Bissekty Formation is characterised by a mix of marine, brackish, freshwater, and terrestrial animal fossils. This stands in contrast the strictly marine fossils found in earlier sediments, and indicates that the Bissekty Formation was formed during the regression of a saltwater sea. The coastline expanded inland again in the upper portion of the Bissekty, represented by a proportional increase of fully aquatic species, which were almost completely absent from the middle period of the formation. Semi-aquatic species remained abundant during this middle period, and the geology of the formations indicates that a braided river system took the place of the coastline. Eventually the area was again completely underwater, during the time period represented by the later Aitym Formation, which preserves coastal marine sediments.

=== Contemporary fauna ===
The Bissekty Formation is the most fossiliferous stratigraphic unit in Central Asia outside of Mongolia. It preserves a wide variety of vertebrate fossils from aquatic and terrestrial settings. The locality from which Dzharaonyx was unearthed, Dzharakuduk, has yielded fossils from other dinosaurs including the tyrannosauroid Timurlengia, the ankylosaur Bissektipelta, and the probable carcharodontosaurid Ulughbegsaurus, as well as fossils from enantiornithines and amphibians.

Aquatic life was abundant in other parts of the formation. A wide variety of sharks and other cartilaginous fish fossils have been found including guitarfishes, sawskates, bullhead sharks, sand sharks, and hybodonts. Bony fish are also known from the Bissekty Formation, including paddlefishes, bowfins, gar, ichthyodectiformes, and aspidorhynchids. These fish, along with the abundant frogs, lizards, and turtles that lived alongside them would have been prey for crocodilians such as Kansajsuchus and Tadzhikosuchus. Other predators of the area included plesiosaurs and the pterosaur Azhdarcho. Dinosaurs were the largest and most abundant terrestrial life in this environment and are represented by large sauropods such as Dzharatitanis, herbivorous ornithischians including the above mentioned Bissektipelta as well as the early ceratopsian Turanoceratops and the hadrosauroid Levnesovia. Theropods were very diverse in this area and fossils from tyrannosauroids, dromaeosaurids, caenagnathids, ornithomimosaurs, and troodontids are known from fragmentary, but well-preserved, specimens. Fossils of birds, especially enantiornithines, are common, but many of these taxa are very incomplete so their exact affinities are not confidently known. Lastly, mammals were also common in this ecosystem. Fossils from early eutherians and metatherians have been found alongside multituberculates and symmetrodonts.

== See also ==
- 2022 in archosaur paleontology
- Cenomanian-Turonian boundary event
- Cretaceous Terrestrial Revolution
- List of Asian dinosaurs
