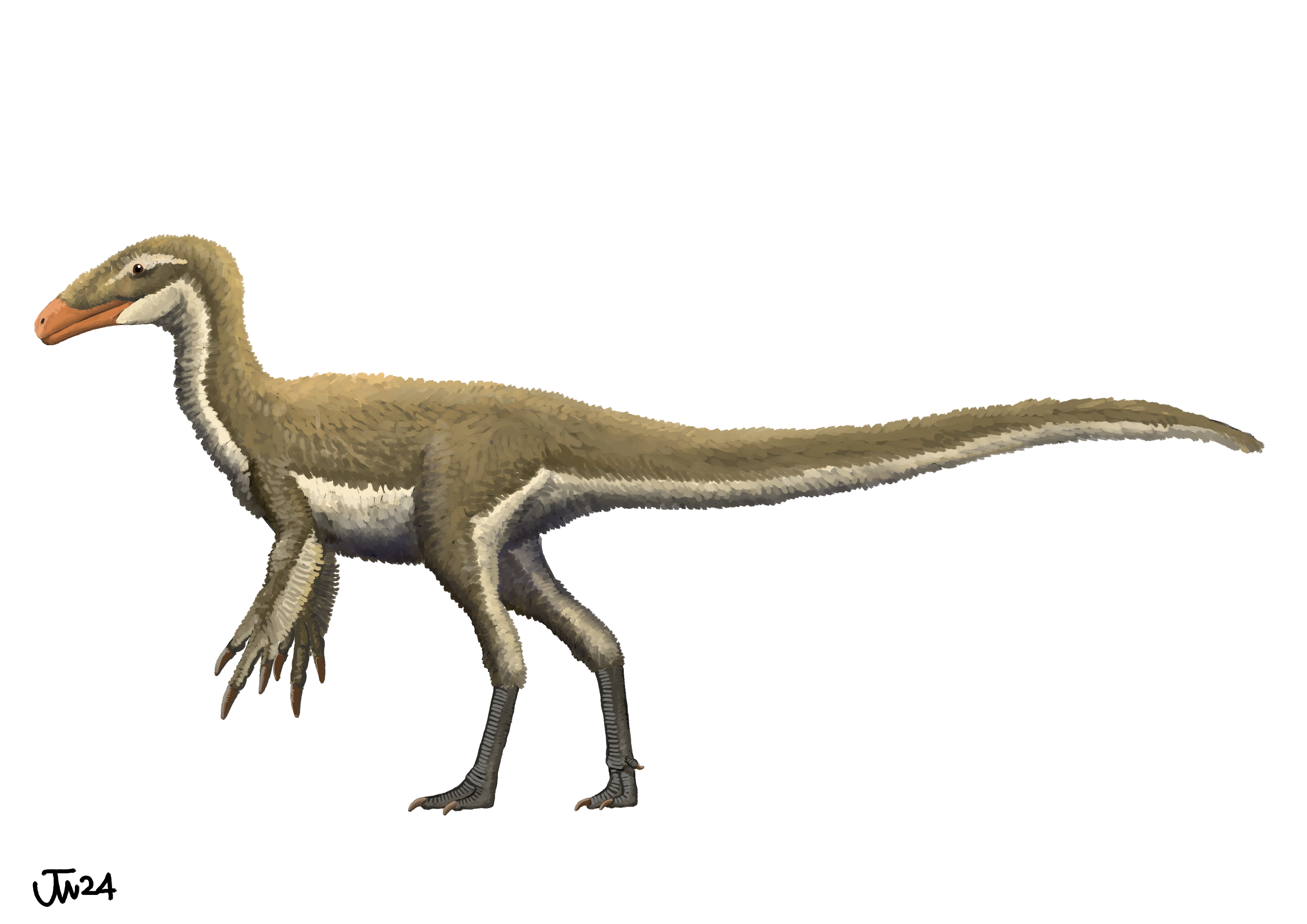
- Life reconstruction of Aorun as a coelurosaur

Scientific classification
- Kingdom: Animalia
- Phylum: Chordata
- Class: Reptilia
- Clade: Dinosauria
- Clade: Saurischia
- Clade: Theropoda
- Clade: Avetheropoda
- Genus: †Aorun; Choiniere et al., 2013

Type species
- †Aorun zhaoi Choiniere et al. 2013

= Aorun =

Aorun Temporal range: Late Jurassic 161.6 Ma

Extinct genus of dinosaurs

Aorun (敖闰 pinyin Áo rùn) is a genus of carnivorous theropod dinosaur first discovered in 2006, with its scientific description published in 2013. It is generally considered one of the oldest known coelurosaurian dinosaurs and is estimated to have lived ~161.6 million years ago during the Late Jurassic Period, though some researchers consider it to be a carnosaurian instead.

== Discovery and naming ==
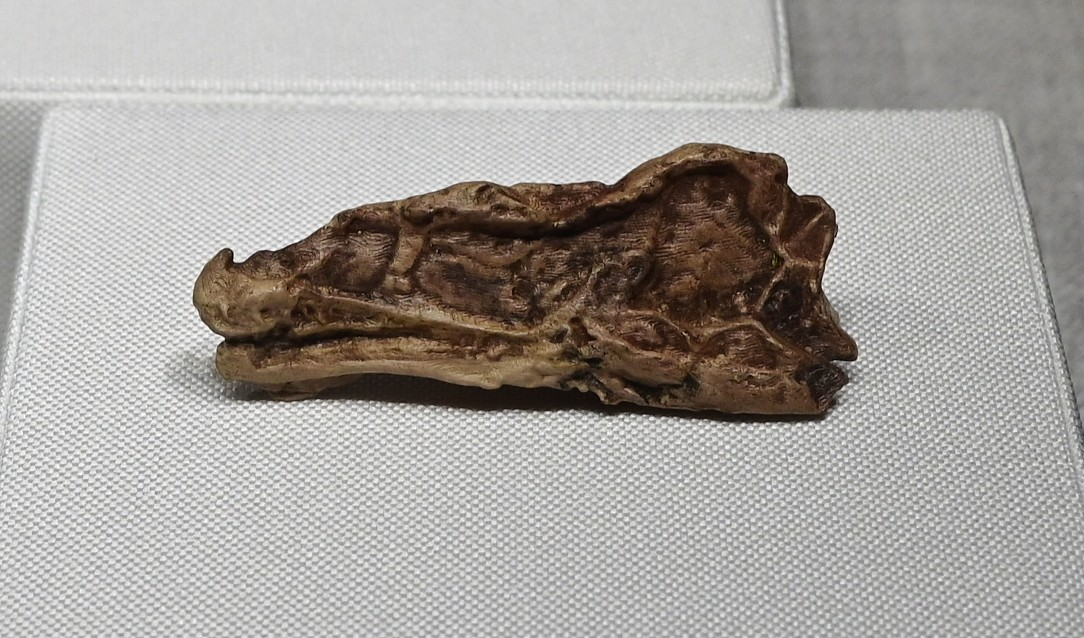
Model of the holotype skull (IVPP V15709)

The fossil which included the skull with numerous teeth, some vertebrae and leg bones were discovered by James Clark, the Ronald B. Weintraub Professor of Biology, in the Department of Biological Sciences of GW's Columbian College of Arts and Sciences with his then doctoral student Jonah Choiniere, along with a team of international researchers in a remote region of Xinjiang in China in 2006. They originally spotted a portion of a leg bone exposed on the surface, and when they dug it up, they found the skull underneath.

The type species Aorun zhaoi was named and described in 2013 by Jonah Choiniere, James Clark, Catherine Forster, Mark Norell, David Eberth, Gregory Erickson, Chu Hongjun and Xu Xing. The generic name is derived from Mandarin Chinese and is actually a shortened masculine name of Ao Run, who is the Chinese mythical deity, the Dragon King of the West Sea in the epic Journey to the West. The specific name honours Professor Zhao Xijin, who led several important vertebrate paleontological expeditions to the Junggar Basin. Aorun zhaoi is the only species under the genus, which thus is monotypic.

== Description ==
The holotype, IVPP V15709, consists of a skull, the lower jaws, a neck vertebra, a dorsal vertebra, three tail vertebrae, the left ulna and hand, the lower ends of both pubes and both lower legs. In the skull, the right orbit contains a nearly complete scleral ring which is composed of overlapping ossicles. The gracile hand of this specimen, which has particularly thin metacarpals III and IV more closely approximates the hands of derived non-avian coelurosaurs than the hands of more basal theropods.

It is estimated that the number of teeth in the premaxilla is four, in the maxilla twelve, and in the dentary between twenty-five and thirty. Its twelve maxillary tooth positions is also suggestive of a juvenile condition, with adult coelurosaurs typically having 15 or more. The teeth are distinctive, because they have no serrations (in the premaxillary and in some dentary teeth), or bear very fine serrations (~10/mm) only on the distal carinae (maxillary teeth and some dentary teeth). The authors noted, however, that the variability in the dentition may represent the juvenile condition.

=== Size and ontogenetic stage ===
The specimen, as can be judged from the available skeletal structure, represents a small bipedal predator. The type specimen is a juvenile individual and measures about 1 m (3.3 ft) long, weighing about 1.5 kilograms (3.3 lbs). Choiniere et al. (2013) noted that based on a histological analysis of its femur and tibia and other characteristics of the holotype, this specimen of Aorun is at most one year old, and is clearly not a perinate. The relatively large orbit of Aorun is not indicative of what would be expected of an adult morphology.

=== Diagnostic features ===
The describing authors established some diagnostic traits. In the depression for a skull opening, the fenestra antorbitalis, to the front a second opening is present, a fenestra maxillaris, that occupies much of the front part of this depression. The teeth in the maxilla only on their rear edges have denticles which are very small and directed towards the point of the teeth. The neck vertebrae are mildly opisthocoelous: with centra that are convex in front and concave at the rear. The claws of the hand are different from each other: the thumb claw is large and curved, but the other two claws are smaller and feature a straight underside. The shinbone has on its front outer side only a high narrow groove functioning as contact with the upper part of the astragalus. This processus ascendens however, though indeed positioned on the outer side, is low.

Aorun is different from other theropods discovered from the same region, such as Guanlong, Haplocheirus, Limusaurus, Monolophosaurus, Sinraptor and Zuolong. It is different from Guanlong in lacking a medial crest on the premaxilla, nasals and frontal bones. It also lacks high external nostrils, and a short anterior maxillary process. It has a shorter premaxillary body, but with a larger maxillary fenestra, a rodlike jugal, closely spaced fine serrations on the distal tooth carinae of the maxilla and dentary. The cervical vertebral centra are elongated with two pneumatic foramina, the neural spines are short and elongated towards the posterior in the dorsal vertebrae, and the pubic shaft is curved at the end. The limb bones are also substantially different.

== Phylogeny ==
The authors who described Aorun placed it in a basal position within Coelurosauria and a member of Coeluridae. The assignment of Aorun to this position is due to its lack of synapomorphies that would provide evidence of its affinity with more derived coelurosaurian taxa. Tykoski (2005) and others have demonstrated that when immature taxa, as is the case with this specimen, are coded as adults in a phylogenetic analysis, the immature taxa were recovered in artificially basal positions relative to adults of the same taxon. In their cladistic analysis of Bannykus and Xiyunykus, Xu et al. (2018) recovered Aorun as a basal alvarezsaur. This assignment has been questioned. Analysis conducted by Kohta Kubo and colleagues with their description of the genus Jaculinykus in 2023 found it to be one the basalmost alvarezsaurs, being slightly more basal than the contemporary genus Haplocheirus. An abbreviated version of the tree they give can be seen below.

- Maniraptora
  - - Therizinosauria
    - Pennaraptora
  - Alvarezsauria
    - Aorun
    - Alvarezsauroidea
      - Haplocheirus
      - - - Tugulusaurus
          - Xiyunykus
        - - Bannykus
          - - Bonapartenykus
            - - Patagonykus
              - - Achillesaurus
                - Alvarezsauridae

Cau (2024) recovered Aorun as a basal member of the superfamily Allosauroidea. A simplified version of the cladogram is shown below.

- Allosauroidea
  - Monolophosaurus
  - - Metriacanthosauridae
    - - Lourinhanosaurus
      - Aorun
      - - Allosaurus
        - Carcharodontosauridae

== Paleoecology ==
=== Provenance and occurrence ===
The remains of the type specimen of Aorun zhaoi IVPP V15709 was recovered in the Wucaiwan locality, in the lower half of the Shishugou Formation, in the Junggar Basin in Xinjiang, China. The specimen was collected by IVPP-GWU Field Expedition in 2006, in terrestrial red-brown siltstone that was shown by radiometric dating to have been deposited approximately 161.6 million years ago, at the boundary of the Oxfordian/Callovian stages of the Jurassic period. This find is significant temporally, because coelurosaur fossils dating to the Jurassic are rare. This specimen is housed in the collection of the Institute of Vertebrate Paleontology and Paleoanthropology, in Beijing, China.

=== Fauna and habitat ===
The paleoenvironment of the Shishugou Formation was warm but had a basin-wide seasonal dry climate. The Wucaiwan locality of the Shishugou Formation has produced the remains of other theropods, such as the basal ceratosaur Limusaurus inextricabilis, the basal coelurosaur Zuolong salleei, the basal tyrannosauroid Guanlong wucaii and the basal alvarezsauroids Haplocheirus sollers and Shishugounykus. These other theropods, however, were recovered in sediments that were Oxfordian in age. This rich paleofauna also included pterosaurs like Sericipterus, ornithischians like Jiangjunosaurus and Yinlong and the sauropods Bellusaurus, Klamelisaurus, Tienshanosaurus and Mamenchisaurus. Aorun was probably a predator of small lizards and mammals. Aorun is the seventh theropod, and oldest coelurosaur known from the Shishugou Formation, which is considered one of the most phylogenetically and trophically diverse middle to late Jurassic theropod faunas.
