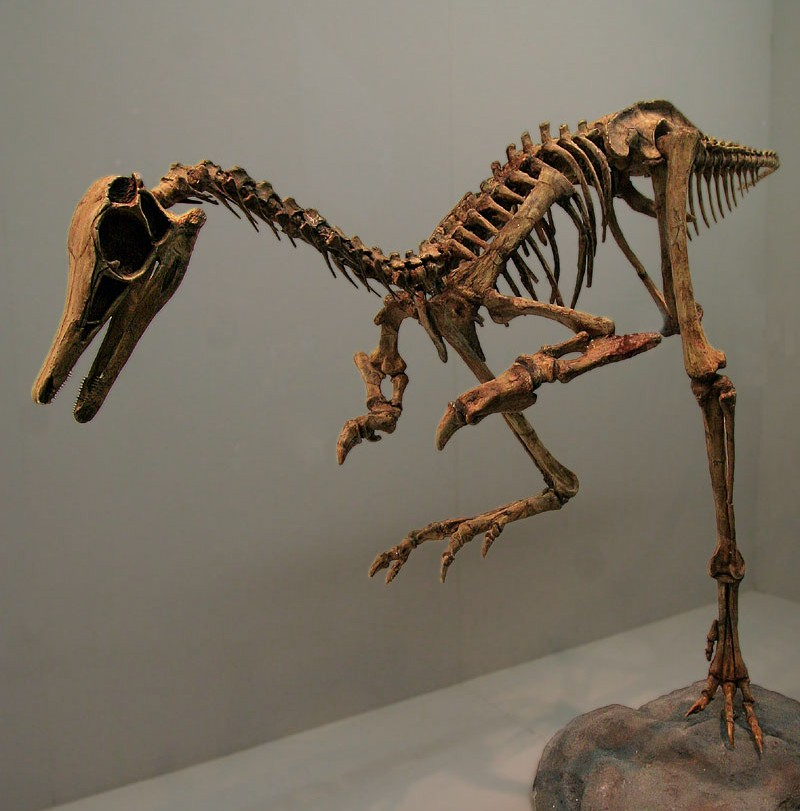
- Skeletal mount of Patagonykus

Scientific classification
- Kingdom: Animalia
- Phylum: Chordata
- Class: Reptilia
- Clade: Dinosauria
- Clade: Saurischia
- Clade: Theropoda
- Clade: Maniraptora
- Clade: †Alvarezsauria; Bonaparte, 1991
- Superfamily: †Alvarezsauroidea; Bonaparte, 1991

Type species
- †Alvarezsaurus calvoi Bonaparte, 1991

Subgroups
- †Alnashetri; †Aorun?; †Bannykus; †Calamosaurus; †Haplocheirus?; †Nqwebasaurus?; †Shishugounykus?; †Tugulusaurus; †Xiyunykus; †Alvarezsauridae

= Alvarezsauroidea =

Alvarezsauroids Temporal range: Late Jurassic-Late Cretaceous, 160–66 Ma

Extinct superfamily of dinosaurs

Alvarezsauroidea (from the Argentine historian, writer and physician Gregorio Álvarez) is a group of small maniraptoran dinosaurs. The group was first formally proposed by Choiniere and colleagues in 2010, to contain the family Alvarezsauridae and non-alvarezsaurid alvarezsauroids, such as Haplocheirus, which is the basalmost of the Alvarezsauroidea (from the Late Jurassic, Asia). The discovery of Haplocheirus extended the stratigraphic evidence for the group Alvarezsauroidea about 63 million years further in the past. The division of Alvarezsauroidea into the Alvarezsauridae and the non-alvarezsaurid alvarezsauroids is based on differences in their morphology, especially in their hand morphology.

== Description ==
Fossils of alvarezsauroids were described since the 1990s, with many alvarezsauroids being found in Asia and other members also known from North America, South America and possibly Europe. The body length of the derived members of Alvarezsauroidea range between 0.5 and 2 m (1 ft 8 in and 6 ft 7 in), but some members may have been larger. Haplocheirus, for example, was among the largest member of the Alvarezsauroidea. Because of the size of Haplocheirus and its basal phylogenetic position, a pattern of miniaturization for the Alvarezsauroidea is suggested. Miniaturizations are very rare in dinosaurs, but convergently evolved in Paraves.

=== Hand morphology and dietary shift ===
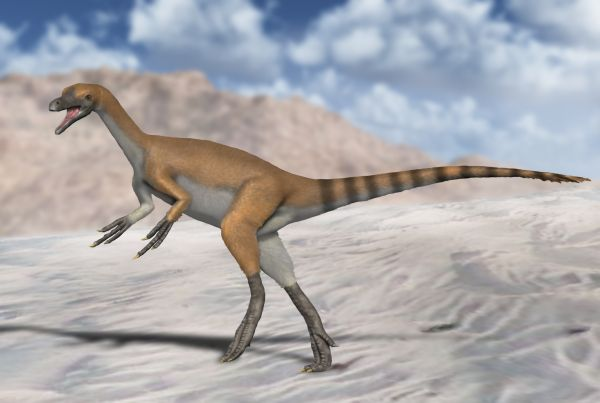
Haplocheirus restoration showcasing the unspecialized hand morphology that later alvarezsaurids would build upon

The differences in the morphology of the hand of basic Alvarezsauroidea and the derived members are characterized by digit reduction. In the evolution of theropod dinosaurs, modifications of the hand were typical. The digital reduction, for instance, is a striking evolutionary phenomenon that is clearly exemplified in theropod dinosaurs.

The enlargement of the manual digit II in alvarezsauroids and the concurrent reduction of the lateral digits, created one functional medial digit and two very small, and presumably vestigial, lateral digits. These morphological changes have been interpreted as adaptations for digging. One possible interpretation suggests that alvarezsauroids fed on insects, using their hands to search beyond the tree bark. This interpretation is consistent with their long, elongate snout and small teeth. Another interpretation suggests that they used their claws to break into ant and termite colonies, though the arm anatomy of an alvarezsaurid would require the animal to lie on its chest against a termite nest.

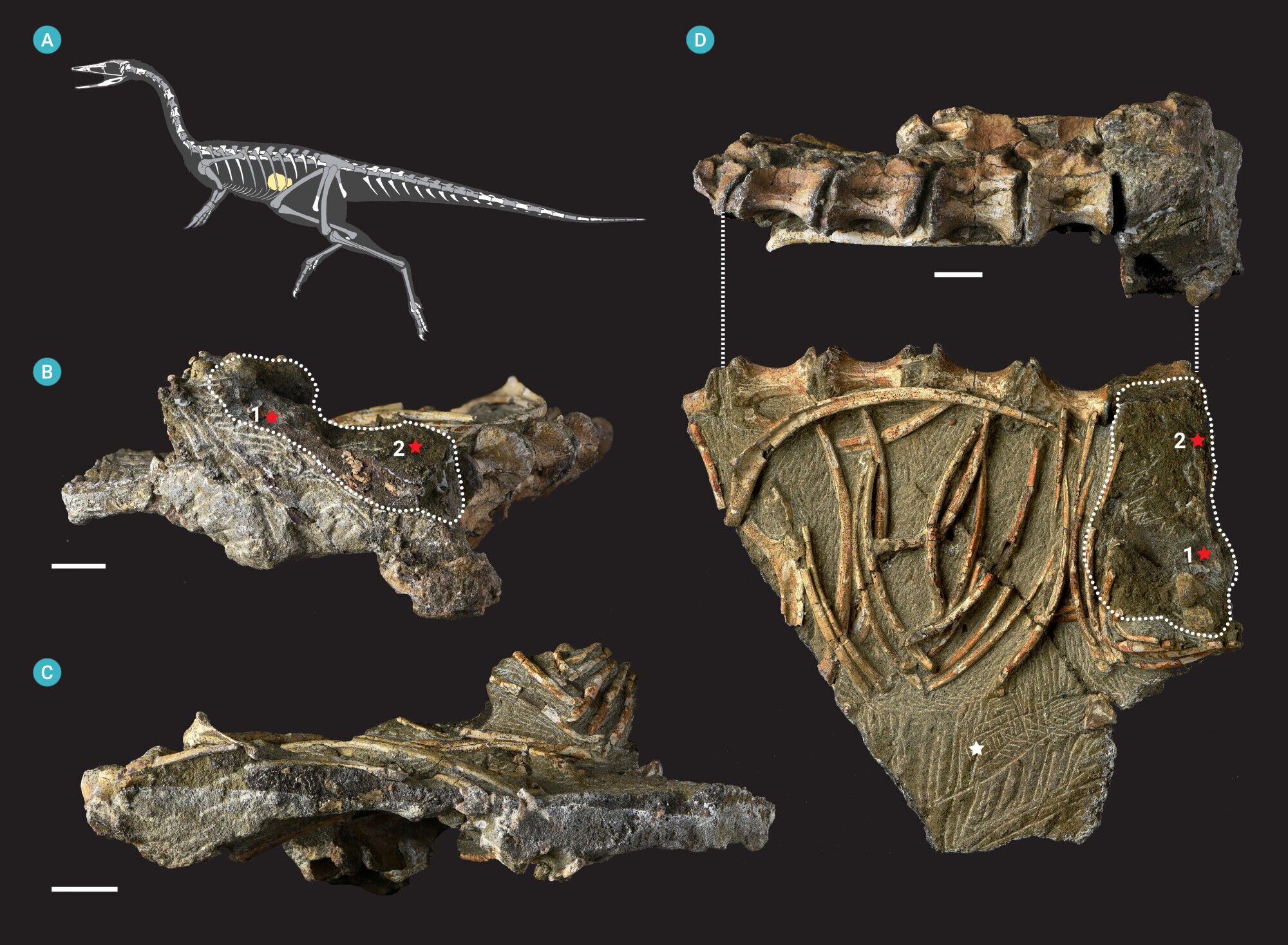
Bannykus holotype showing the intestinal contents (yellowish conglomerate)

In contrast to the digit reduction of the hand of derived alvarezsauroid to a claw used for digging, Haplocheirus was still able to grab things. However, Haplocheirus already shows the enlargement of the second manual digit. Important data on the evolution of the alvarezsauroid hand is also provided by the basal parvicursorine Linhenykus. Another difference between Alvarezsauridae and Haplocheirus is the dentition. While alvarezsauroids show a simplified homogenous dentition, Haplocheirus on the other side possesses recurved serrated teeth. The dentition of Haplocheirus and their basal phylogenetic position, suggest that carnivory was the primitive condition for the clade. Furthermore, Haplocheirus possesses more teeth on the maxilla than other alvarezsauroids. Additionally, studies on the range of motion and myology of alvarezsauroid arms suggest a digging insectivore lifestyle.

In 2025, Wang and colleagues identified hard tissue debris and possible soft tissues in the intestinal contents of the Bannykus holotype (represented by the yellowish conglomerate) based on scanning electron microscopy, which was consistent with further Raman spectroscopy analysis that detected "characteristic peaks indicative of bone-derived material", suggesting Bannykus probably had a carnivorous diet. The authors concluded that both the forelimb reduction and the dietary shift from carnivory to probably insectivory among alvarezsaurians occurred later in their evolution.

== Classification ==
The phylogenetic placement of Alvarezsauroidea is still unclear. At first, they were interpreted as a sister group of Avialae (birds) or nested within the group Avialae and considered to be flightless birds, because they share many morphological characteristics with them, such as a loosely sutured skull, a keeled sternum, fused wrist elements, and a posteriorly directed pubis. But this association was reevaluated after the discovery of the primitive forms like Haplocheirus, Patagonykus and Alvarezsaurus, which do not show all bird-like features as the first discovered species Mononykus and Shuvuuia. This shows that bird-like characteristics were developed multiple times within the Maniraptora. Furthermore, the Alvarezsauroidea had simplified homogenous dentition, convergent with that of some extant insectivorous mammals. More recently, they have been placed within the Coelurosauria basal to the Maniraptora or as a sister taxon of Ornithomimosauria within the Ornithomimiformes.

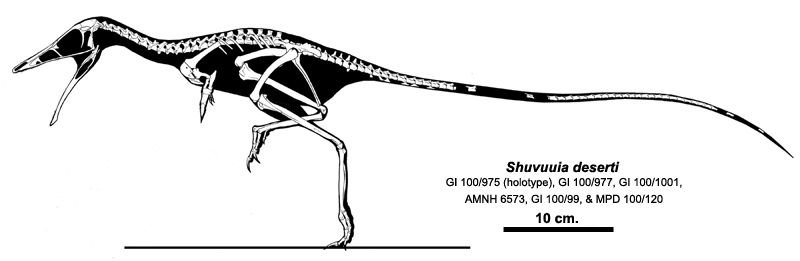
Shuvuuia skeletal by Headden

The cladogram below is the latest and most comprehensive analysis of alvarezsaurian evolution, following Meso et al. (2024).

- Alvarezsauria
  - Shishugounykus inexpectus
  - - Aorun zhaoi
    - - Haplocheirus sollers
      - - - Bannykus wulatensis
          - - Xiyunykus pengi
            - Tugulusaurus faciles
        - - Alnashetri cerropoliciensis
          - Alvarezsauridae
            - - Patagonykinae
                - Bonapartenykus ultimus
                - Patagonykus puertai
              - - Achillesaurus manazzonei
                - Alvarezsaurus calvoi
            - Parvicursorinae
              - Ceratonykus oculatus
              - - Khulsanurus magnificus
                - - Qiupanykus zhangi
                  - - Dzharaonyx eski
                    - - - Linhenykus monodactylus
                        - Parvicursor remotus
                      - Mononykini
                        - Shuvuuia deserti
                        - - Mononykus olecranus
                          - - Ondogurvel alifanovi
                            - Albinykus baatar

== Geographical distribution ==
At first, alvarezsauroids were thought to have been originated in South America. However, the discovery of Haplocheirus, and its basal phylogenetic position, as well as its early temporal position, suggests they derived in Asia rather than South America. Xu et al. (2011) suggested that at least three dispersal events of alvarezsauroids took place; one from Asia to Gondwana, one from Gondwana to Asia, and one from Asia to North America. This hypothesis is consistent with faunal interchanges. On the other hand, some theropod groups are inconsistent with this hypothesis. Xu et al. (2013) used event−based tree−fitting to perform a quantitative analysis of alvarezsauroid biogeography. Their results showed an absence of statistical support for previous biogeographic hypotheses that favour pure vicariance or pure dispersal scenarios as explanations for the distributions of alvarezsauroids across South America, North America and Asia. They instead found that statistically significant biogeographic reconstructions suggest a dominant role for sympatric events ("within area" ones), combined with a mix of vicariance, dispersal and regional extinction. The Asian origin of alvarezsauroids is also bolstered by the discovery of alvarezsaurid specimens from the Turonian-age Bissekty Formation (some of which were named Dzharaonyx in 2022) of Uzbekistan and Bannykus, Tugulusaurus, and Xiyunykus from the Early Cretaceous of China. However, Makovicky et al came to a different conclusion based on the description of a new specimen of Alnashetri, finding support for the group having a Pangaean ancestral distribution shaped by a combination of vicariance and regional extinctions of basal lineages, leading the disjunction distribution of various divergent clades across landmasses.

== Sources ==
- Nesbitt, S.J.; Clarke, J.A.; Turner, A.H.; Norell, M.A. (2011). "A small alvarezsauroid from eastern Gobi Desert offers insight into evolutionary patterns in the Alvarezsauroidea". Journal of Vertebrate Paleontology. 31 (1): 144–153. doi:10.1080/02724634.2011.540053.
- Turner, Alan H.; Nesbitt, Sterling J.; Norell, Mark A. (2009). "A Large Alvarezsaurid from the Late Cretaceous of Mongolia". American Museum Novitates (3648): 1–14. doi:10.1206/639.1.
- Bonaparte, J.F. (1991). "Los vertebrados fosiles de la formacion Rio Colorado, de la ciudad de Neuquen y Cercanias, Creatcio Superior, Argentina". Revista del Museo Argentino de Ciencias Naturales "Bernardino Rivadavia" Paleontologia. 4: 15–23.
- Choiniere, J. (2010). Guest Post: Haplocheirus, the Skillful One Dave Hone's Archosaur Musings, April 23, 2011
