= Beta-keratin =

Keratin (avian)

Identifiers
- Symbol: Keratin
- Pfam: PF02422
- InterPro: IPR003461
Available protein structures:
- PDB: IPR003461 PF02422 (ECOD; PDBsum)
- AlphaFold: IPR003461; PF02422

Beta-keratin (β-keratin) is a member of a structural protein family found in the epidermis of reptiles, birds, and pangolins. It forms a substance that is rigid and waterproof, with different versions of the protein appearing in scales, claws, and feathers. It was considered a type of keratin because it is analogous to the keratin in mammals, but it is now instead considered a "beta-protein."

== Structure ==
Beta-keratins were named due to their composition of stacked beta sheets in the epidermal stratum corneum, distinguishing them from alpha-keratins, which are intermediate-filament proteins rich in alpha helices. Recent studies suggest that the term keratin should be restricted to alpha-keratins. As a result, "beta-keratins" are now often referred to as "corneous beta-proteins" or "keratin-associated beta-proteins."

== Function ==
β-keratins contribute significantly to the rigidity and waterproofing of reptilian skin by being impregnated into the stratum corneum. This provides protection against desiccation and enhances durability in terrestrial environments. In birds, β-keratin is found in the scales, beaks, claws, and feathers. Phylogenetic studies indicate that feather β-keratins evolved from scale β-keratins. The scale β-keratins form the basal group in avians, followed by claw β-keratin genes, with further recombination leading to new feather and feather-like β-keratin genes. These evolutionary patterns correlate with genomic loci.

== Evolution in birds ==
Changes in β-keratins may have influenced the evolution of powered flight. Molecular dating suggests that avian β-keratin genes began diverging from their crocodilian relatives approximately 216 million years ago. However, feather β-keratins did not begin differentiating until around 125 million years ago, coinciding with the adaptive radiation of birds during the Cretaceous. Modern feather β-keratins exhibit increased elasticity, which may have contributed to the development of flight.

Feathered non-avian dinosaurs, such as Anchiornis and Archaeopteryx, likely possessed avian β-keratins but lacked the specialized feather β-keratins, raising questions about their flight capabilities.

== Fossil evidence ==
The small alvarezsaurid dinosaur Shuvuuia deserti was once believed to have a feather-like skin covering composed of β-keratin. An immunohistochemical analysis by Schweitzer et al. (1999) initially supported this conclusion. However, subsequent research by Saitta et al. (2018) refuted this claim, demonstrating that the fibers analyzed consisted of inorganic calcium phosphate rather than β-keratin.

== See also ==
- Keratin
- Feathered dinosaurs
- Sauropsida
