= Cerro Policía =

Coordinates: 39°44′S 68°31′W

- Municipality and village
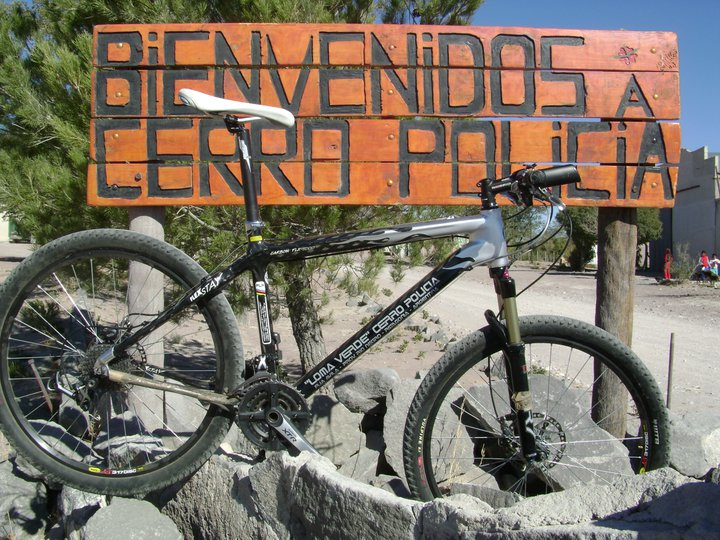
- Welcome sign
- Interactive map of Cerro Policía
- Country: Argentina
- Province: Río Negro Province
- Department: El Cuy Department
- Time zone: UTC−3 (ART)
- Climate: BWk

Cerro Policía is a village and municipality in Río Negro Province in Argentina.
