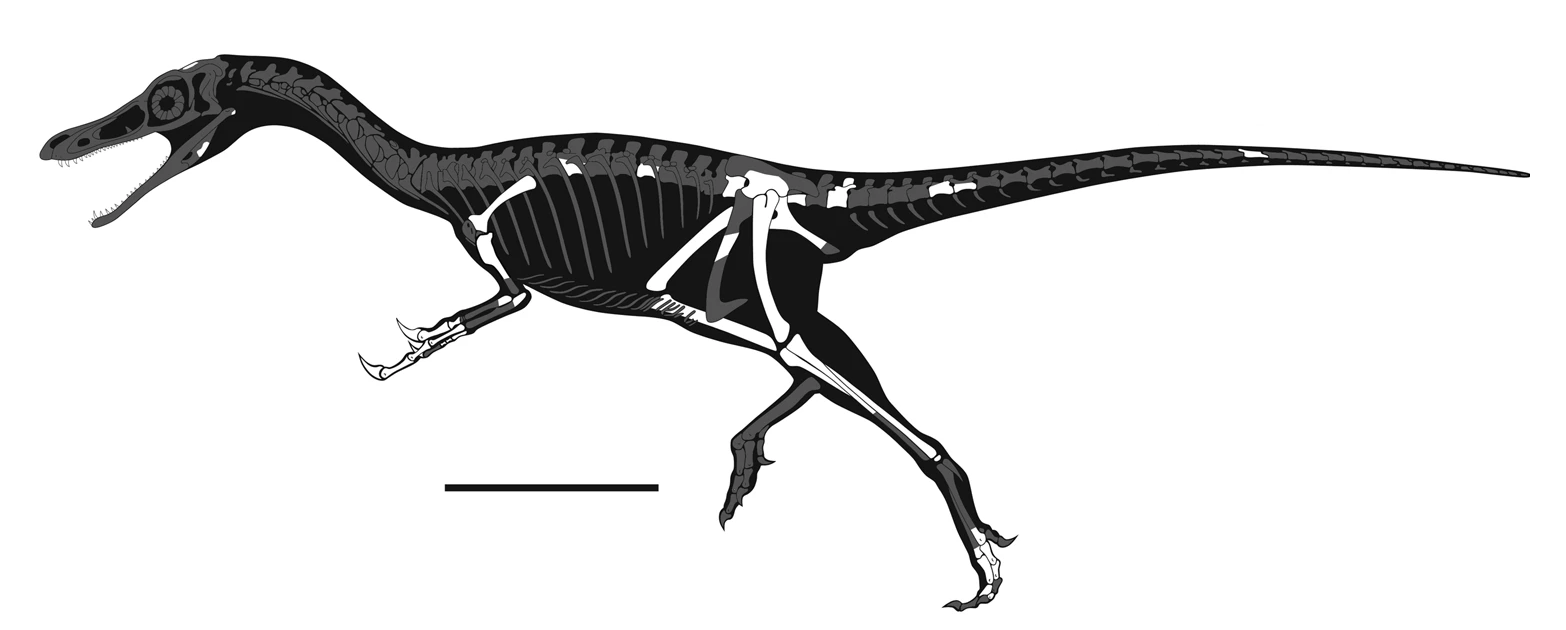
- Skeletal reconstruction

Scientific classification
- Kingdom: Animalia
- Phylum: Chordata
- Class: Reptilia
- Clade: Dinosauria
- Clade: Saurischia
- Clade: Theropoda
- Superfamily: †Alvarezsauroidea
- Genus: †Shishugounykus; Qin et al., 2019

Type species
- †Shishugounykus inexpectus Qin et al., 2019

= Shishugounykus =

Shishugounykus Temporal range: Late Jurassic, ~160.2 Ma

Extinct genus of maniraptoran dinosaurs

Shishugounykus (meaning "Shishugou claw") is a genus of basal alvarezsaurian dinosaur from the Shishugou Formation of Xinjiang, China. The type and only species is Shishugounykus inexpectus. The specific name refers to the unexpected discovery of another species of alvarezsaur from the Shishugou Formation (other alvarezsaurs from this formation include Haplocheirus and possibly Aorun). Its affinities to alvarezsaurs have subsequently been questioned.
