= Xixianykus =

Xixianykus Temporal range: Late Cretaceous, 83 Ma

Scientific classification
- Kingdom: Animalia
- Phylum: Chordata
- Class: Reptilia
- Clade: Dinosauria
- Clade: Saurischia
- Clade: Theropoda
- Family: †Alvarezsauridae
- Genus: †Xixianykus; Xu et al, 2010
- Species: †X. zhangi

Binomial name
- †Xixianykus zhangi Xu et al., 2010

Extinct genus of dinosaurs

Xixianykus is a genus of alvarezsaurid theropod dinosaur known from a slab of rock which contains a partial postcranial skeleton unearthed in the Late Cretaceous (Coniacian-Santonian) Majiacun Formation of the Xixia Basin in Henan, China.

== Discovery and naming ==
The fossil, holotype XMDFEC V0011, was found in the Majiacun Formation in Henan Province, China. The fossil consists of a partial skeleton, without the skull. Parts of the hind legs, pelvis and spine has also been recovered. Xixianykus is among the oldest of the derived alvarezsauroids, the parvicursorines, dated to the Santonian–Coniacian, as opposed to other parvicursorines, which are either Campanian or Maastrichtian.

The type species is Xixianykus zhangi described in 2010 by Xu Xing. The genus name refers to Xixia County and to the Greek word for claw ("onyx"). The latter is a common element used in names for Alvarezsaurids. The species name is in honor of Zhang Xinglao.

== Description ==
Size comparison

Xixianykus was a small animal, about 50 centimetres (20 in) long and 20 centimetres (7.9 in) high, and may have weighed just about 0.74 kg. It is one of the smallest-known dinosaurs (not counting avians). It appears to have many adaptations towards a cursorial (running) lifestyle. It was about 50 centimetres long but had 20-centimetre-long (7.9 in) legs and a short femur combined with a long tibia and metatarsus, as well as including an arctometatarsalian pes, a highly modified structure in the feet of theropod dinosaurs used to enhance cursorial capability, which was found within the known fossil material, and these are all good indicators of it being a fast runner. It was probably covered in feathers and had small, robust arms with one large claw for each hand, as well as a tubular snout used to feed likely on colonial insects.

Despite claims by Gregory S. Paul that the remains assigned to Xixianykus belong to a juvenile individual, osteohistological analyses show that the remains assigned to Xixianykus belong to an adult individual.
