= Tugulusaurus =

Tugulusaurus Temporal range: Early Cretaceous, Barremian–Albian

Scientific classification
- Kingdom: Animalia
- Phylum: Chordata
- Class: Reptilia
- Clade: Dinosauria
- Clade: Saurischia
- Clade: Theropoda
- Clade: †Alvarezsauria
- Superfamily: †Alvarezsauroidea
- Genus: †Tugulusaurus; Dong, 1973
- Species: †T. faciles

Binomial name
- †Tugulusaurus faciles Dong, 1973

Extinct genus of dinosaurs

Tugulusaurus (meaning "Tugulu lizard") is a genus of coelurosaurian theropod dinosaur, belonging to the Alvarezsauroidea, that is known from the Early Cretaceous Tugulu Group in the Urhe area of China. It was one of the first members of Alvarezsauria ever discovered. The type and only known species is T. faciles.

== Discovery ==
From 1964 dinosaur fossils were excavated in the Junggar Basin of Xinjiang. In 1973 a number of these were described by paleontologist Dong Zhiming, among them the bones of a small theropod which he named Tugulusaurus faciles. The generic name refers to the Tugulu Group. The specific name is derived from Latin facilis, here with the meaning of "easily moving", referring to the agility of the animal as indicated by its "delicate bones".

The holotype, IVPP V4025, was found in layers of the Lianmuqin Formation dating from the Barremian–Albian. It consists of a partial skeleton including four partial tail vertebrae, much of the left leg and part of the right, the first fingers of both hands, and a rib. The femur has a length of about 215 millimetres (8.5 in). The left first metacarpal is very short: 26 millimetres (1.0 in). The skeleton represents the only remains of the species that have ever been discovered.

== Description ==
Tugulusaurus was an early alvarezsaur, likely measuring at 1.9–3 metres (6.2–9.8 ft) in length. It probably had a relatively long neck and tail, as well as a streamlined head with a beak-like snout, and large, hooked claws. It was an agile animal, likely having long legs, which would aid in reaching high speeds, in order to chase prey and retreat from potential threats. Being an alvarezsauroid, it likely used its long claws to dig and tear into wood or dirt in order to find food.

== Classification ==
Tugulusaurus was originally classified by Dong in 1973 as a member of the Ornithomimidae, within the Coelurosauria. In the years that followed, the genus was often considered a nomen dubium. However, in 2005 Oliver Rauhut and Xu Xing concluded that it is a valid genus of basal coelurosaurian of unknown affinities. In their cladistic analysis of the newly described taxa Bannykus and Xiyunykus, Xu et al. (2018) recovered Tugulusaurus as a member of Alvarezsauria.
