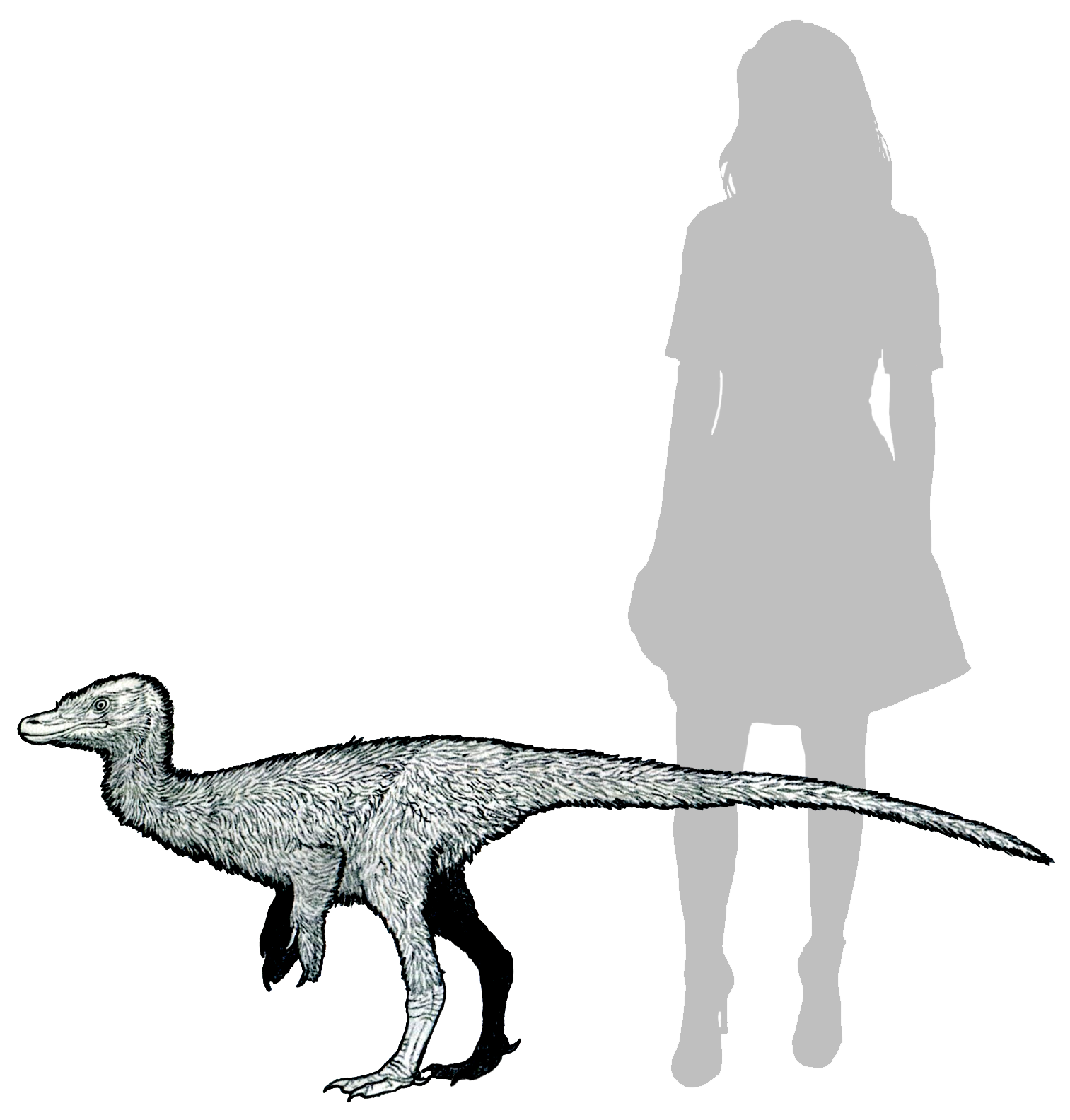
- Scaled reconstruction

Scientific classification
- Kingdom: Animalia
- Phylum: Chordata
- Class: Reptilia
- Clade: Dinosauria
- Clade: Saurischia
- Clade: Theropoda
- Superfamily: †Alvarezsauroidea
- Genus: †Xiyunykus; Xu et al., 2018

Type species
- †Xiyunykus pengi Xu et al., 2018

= Xiyunykus =

Xiyunykus Temporal range: Early Cretaceous, 126–120 Ma

Extinct genus of Dinosaur

Xiyunykus (meaning "western claw"; "xiyu" is Mandarin for "west" and refers to Western China where it was found) is a genus of alvarezsauroid theropod from the Early Cretaceous-aged Tugulu Group of what is now China. Only one species has been described, Xiyunykus pengi.

== Paleoecology ==
Dinosaurs contemporaneous with Xiyunykus in the Tugulu Group of Xinjiang include the stegosaur Wuerhosaurus, the coeval alvarezsaur Tugulusaurus, the carcharodontosaurid Kelmayisaurus, the dubious maniraptoran Phaedrolosaurus, the problematic coelurosaur Xinjiangovenator, and the ceratopsian Psittacosaurus xinjiangensis.

== Evolutionary significance ==
Xiyunykus, along with Bannykus, fills a 70-million year gap in alvarezsaur evolution by exhibiting cranial and postcranial morphologies intermediate between the typical theropod forelimb of Haplocheirus and the highly reduced forelimbs and minute teeth of Late Cretaceous alvarezsaurids.
