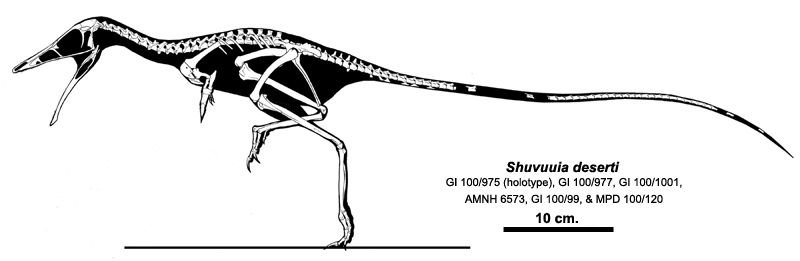
- Skeletal reconstruction

Scientific classification
- Kingdom: Animalia
- Phylum: Chordata
- Class: Reptilia
- Clade: Dinosauria
- Clade: Saurischia
- Clade: Theropoda
- Family: †Alvarezsauridae
- Subfamily: †Parvicursorinae
- Tribe: †Mononykini
- Genus: †Shuvuuia; Chiappe, Norell & Clark, 1998
- Species: †S. deserti

Binomial name
- †Shuvuuia deserti Chiappe, Norell, & Clark, 1998

= Shuvuuia =

Shuvuuia Temporal range: Late Cretaceous, 75 Ma

Extinct genus of bird-like dinosaurs

Shuvuuia is a genus of bird-like theropod dinosaur from the late Cretaceous period of Mongolia. It is a member of the family Alvarezsauridae, small coelurosaurian dinosaurs which are characterized by short but powerful forelimbs specialized for digging. The type (and only known) species is Shuvuuia deserti, or "desert bird". The name Shuvuuia is derived from the Mongolian word shuvuu (шувуу) meaning "bird".

== Description ==
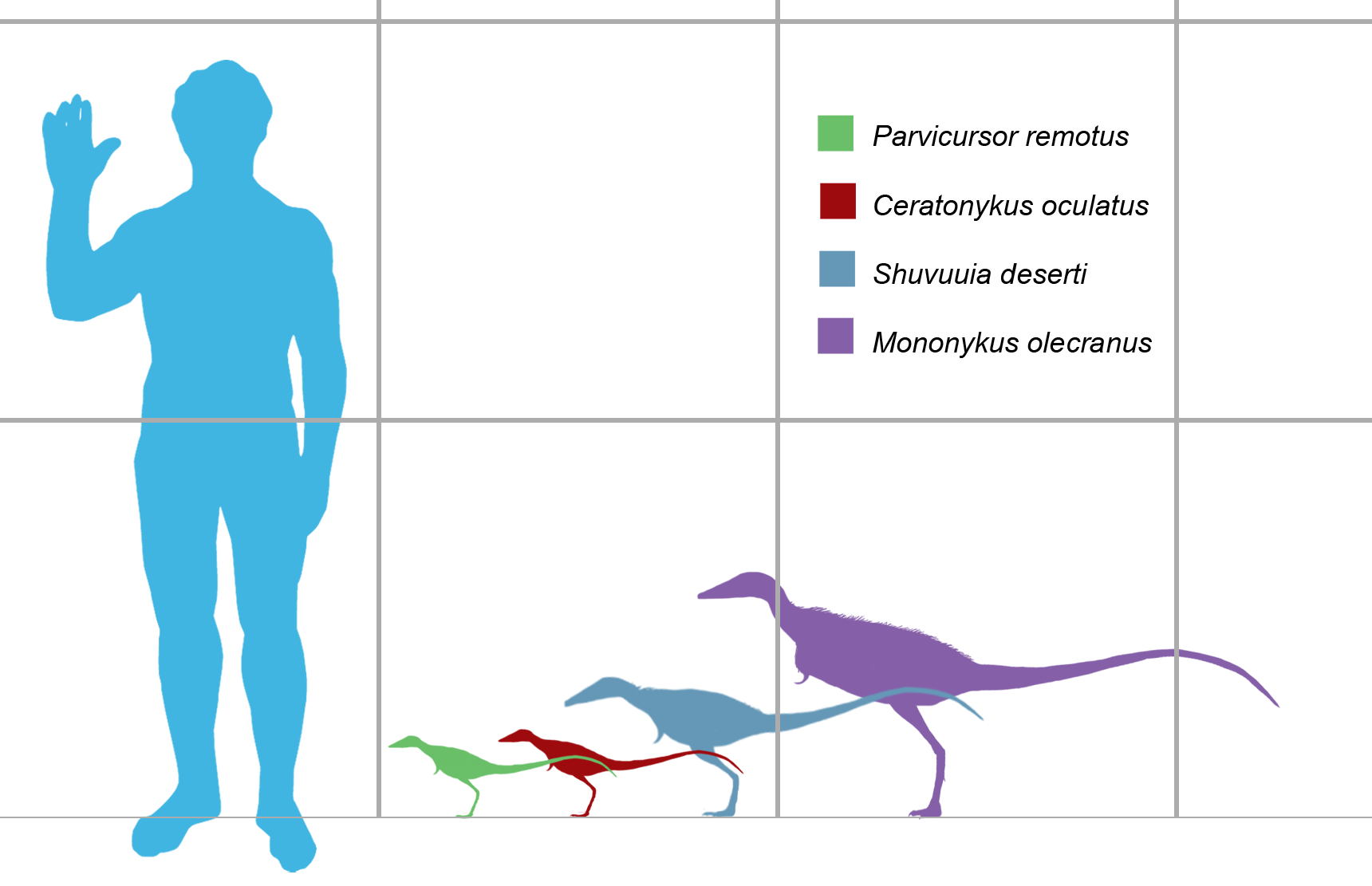
Size of various Alvarezsaurids compared to a human, Shuvuuia in blue

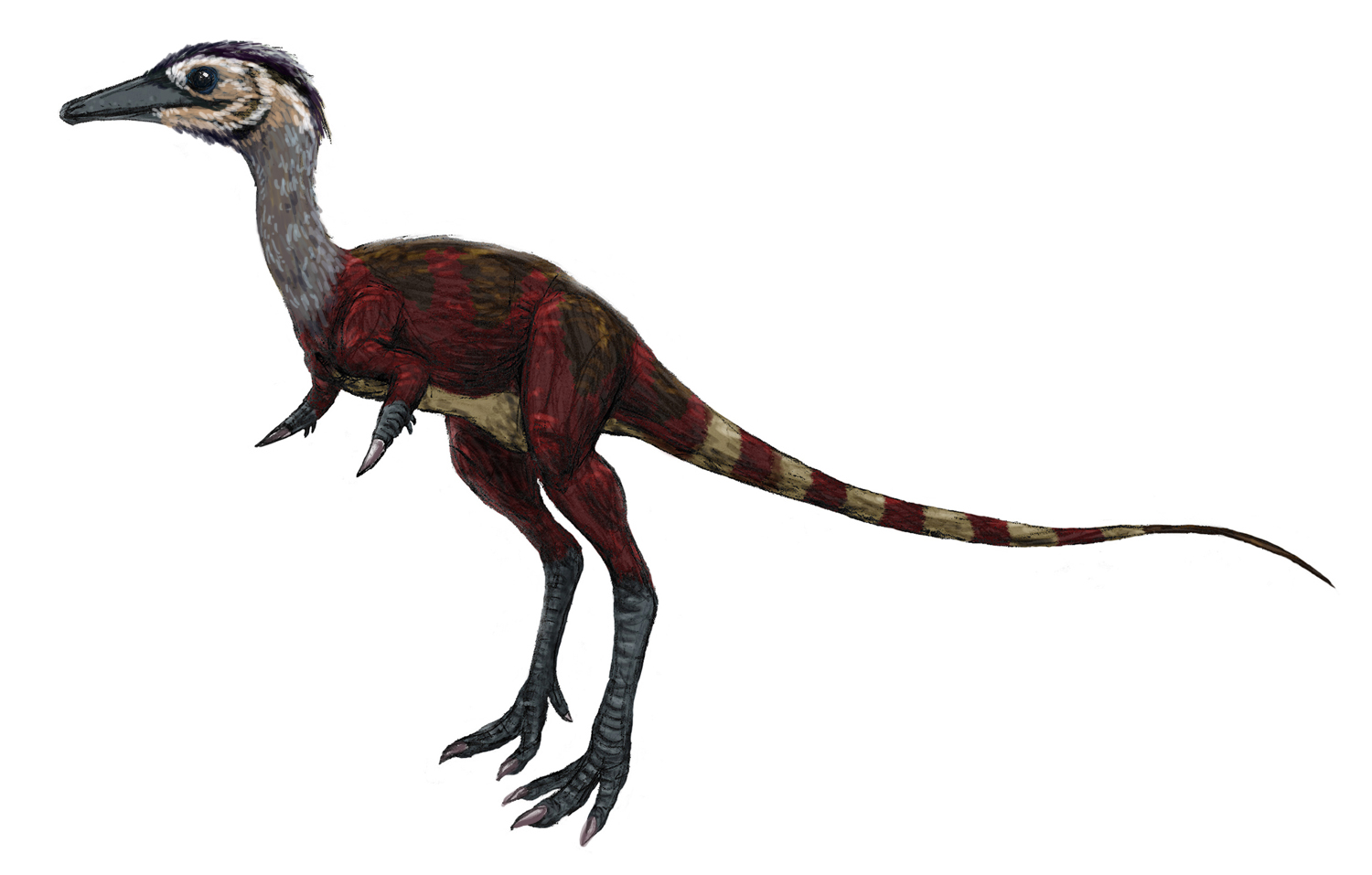
Life restoration

Shuvuuia was a small and lightly built animal. At 1 m (3.3 ft) in length and 3.5 kg (7.7 lb) in body mass, it is one of the smallest known non-avian dinosaurs. The skull is lightly built with long and slender jaws and minute teeth. Shuvuuia is unique among non-avian theropods in the skull's ability to perform prokinesis; that is, it could flex its upper jaw independently of its braincase.

The hindlimbs of Shuvuuia were long, slender, and short-toed, which may indicate significant running capabilities. The forelimbs, however, were unusually short and powerfully constructed. Although originally Shuvuuia and other alvarezsaurids were thought to have only a single digit on the front limb, newer specimens show the presence of reduced second and third fingers in addition to the massively enlarged thumb known from previous specimens.

Fossils of Shuvuuia are currently known from two locations within the Djadochta Formation: Ukhaa Tolgod and Tögrögiin Shiree. These sites are thought to be about 75 million years old (late Campanian age). Contemporary genera included Velociraptor and Protoceratops.

== Paleobiology ==
=== Nocturnal adaptations and diet ===
Like other alvarezsaurids, Shuvuuia may have used its forelimbs to open insect nests, and its slender, unusually mobile jaws to probe after such prey. However, new research based on analysis of the theropod's ears suggests that it was actually an owl-like, nocturnal hunter which used its strong legs to run down prey, and its arms to dig small prey such as insects and mammals out of burrows and shrubs; its lagena is about the same size as that of barn owls, giving it superb hearing in addition to its fantastic night vision (analyzed by looking at its scleral ring) allowing it to potentially hunt in complete darkness, unlike other theropods to which it has been compared, such as the apparently diurnal Dromaeosaurus and Alioramus. However, these conclusions were rejected by a study in 2025. It was objected that the lagena relative size had been measured by a comparison to the braincase depth, which however with basal theropods was much lower than in modern birds. The hearing frequency range of Shuvuuia would in fact be comparable to that of a chicken.

=== Feathers ===
Specimen IGM 100/977 of Shuvuuia was found surrounded by small, hollow, tube-like structures resembling the rachis (central vane) of modern bird feathers. Though highly deteriorated and poorly preserved, biochemical analyses later showed that these structures contain decay products of the protein beta-keratin, and more significantly, the absence of alpha-keratin. While beta-keratin is found in all integumentary (skin and feather) cells of reptiles and birds, only bird feathers completely lack alpha-keratin. These findings show that, though poorly preserved, Shuvuuia likely possessed a coat of feathers.
