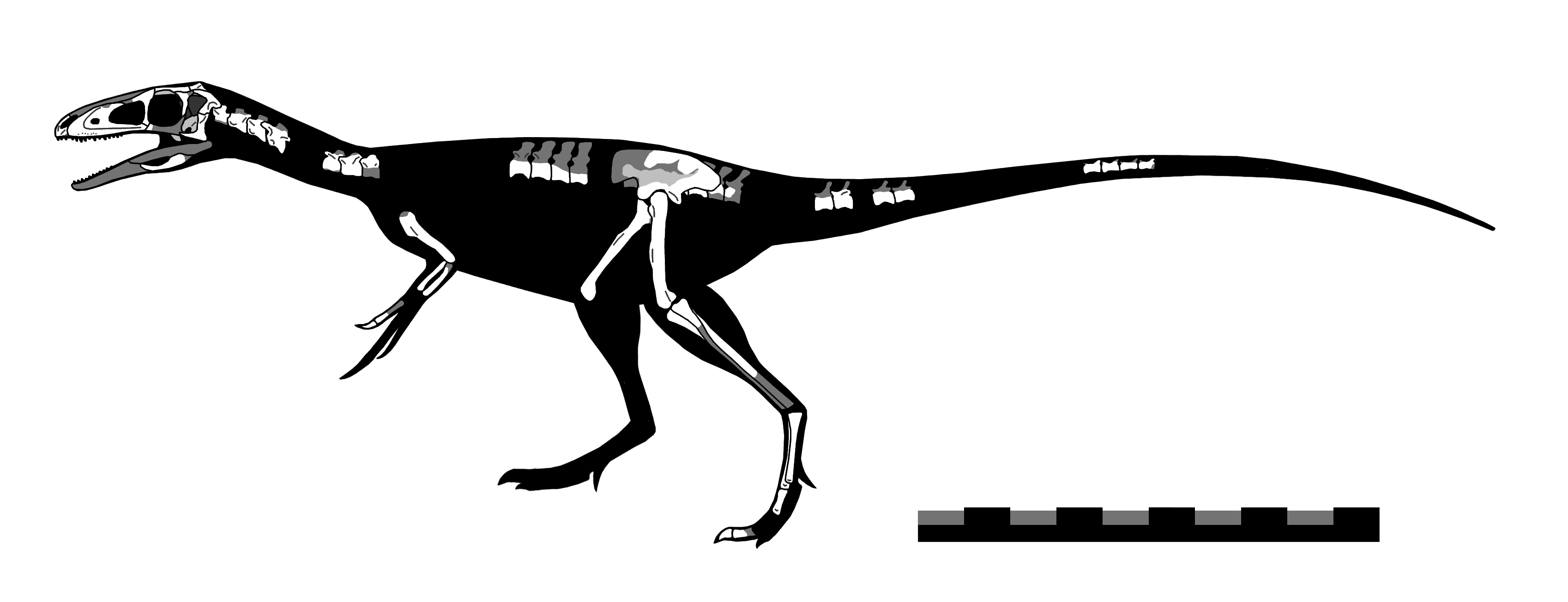
- Skeletal diagram of known material in white and light grey

Scientific classification
- Kingdom: Animalia
- Phylum: Chordata
- Class: Reptilia
- Clade: Dinosauria
- Clade: Saurischia
- Clade: Theropoda
- Clade: Coelurosauria (?)
- Genus: †Zuolong; Choiniere et al., 2010

Type species
- †Zuolong salleei Choiniere et al., 2010

= Zuolong =

Zuolong Temporal range: Late Jurassic ~161.2 to 158.7 Ma - Oxfordian

Extinct genus of dinosaurs

Zuolong (/ˌtzwoːlʊŋ/) is an extinct genus of tetanuran theropod from the Late Jurassic period of China. The type and only species is Z. salleei. The generic name of Zuolong is in honor of General Zuo Zōngtáng (also known as "General Tso") with the Chinese word "long" which means dragon. The specific epithet "salleei" is in honor of Hilmar Sallee, who funded the expedition which led to the specimen's discovery.

== Discovery ==
Zuolong was discovered in the upper part of the Wucaiwan member of the Shishugou Formation in Xinjiang, China. 40Ar/39Ar dating of volcanic feldspar at this locality places it at the span between the Callovian and Oxfordian boundary, and Zuolong was discovered in the upper part of this unit, which is interpreted as being Oxfordian in age. The specimen was discovered in 2001 by the Sino-American field expedition, but it was not described until 2010 when Jonah Choiniere, James Clark, Catherine Forester, and Xu Xing published a full analysis of the bones.

Choiniere and colleagues noted that, at the time of its description, Zuolong was one of the oldest coelurosaurs known to science, but that the implications of its discovery cannot be fully understood until more fossil material is discovered. The Middle Jurassic preserves very few coelurosaurs, and the ones which are known are almost all from China, with the exception of Proceratosaurus and Kileskus.

The holotype of Zuolong, given the designation IVPP V15912, consists of a partially complete skull and numerous post-cranial elements. The skull preserves a maxilla, a premaxilla, one of the quadrate bones, both quadratojugals, a squamosal bone, both ectopterygoids, a pterygoid bone, a lacrimal bone, a postorbital bone, a partial frontal and parietal, as well as three of the teeth from the lower jaw. Other elements of the skeleton which have been preserved include five cervical vertebrae, four dorsal vertebrae, five sacral vertebrae, eight caudal vertebrae, a humerus, the radius and ulna from the left arm, one of the hand claws, the left ilium, both pubic bones, both femora, a tibia, part of a fibula, three metatarsals from the right foot, three toes, and a single toe claw.

== Description ==
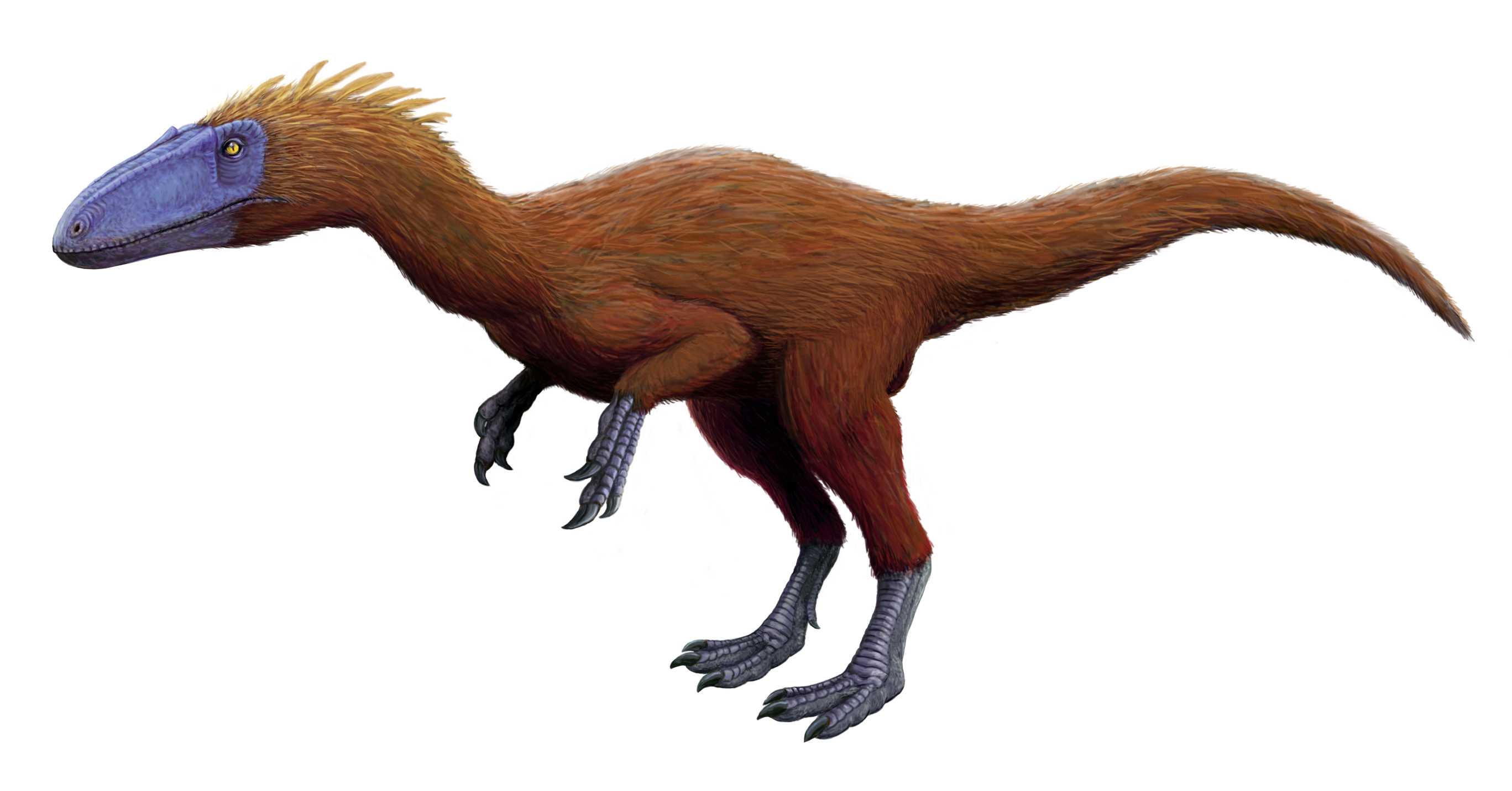
Life restoration of Zuolong with a hypothetical coat of feathers

Zuolong was not a large theropod. Choiniere and colleagues used two regression analyses based on the work of P. Christiansen and R.A. Fariña as well as François Therrien, and Donald M. Henderson to estimate the body mass of Zuolong and they calculated a range of between 16–50 kilograms (35–110 lb) based on the length of the femur and the size of the skull. This would make it about half the estimated size of its contemporary, Guanlong. Later, Gregory S. Paul suggested that the holotype is a juvenile and estimates a total adult length of 3 metres (9.8 ft) and a mass of 50 kilograms (110 lb). Other authors have suggested a larger adult size, giving a total length of 3.35 metres (11.0 ft) meters and a mass of 43 kilograms (95 lb) kilograms. The holotype is also considered by Thomas R. Holtz Jr. to almost certainly be from a juvenile theropod.

Choiniere and colleagues provide the following traits as autapomorphies for the skull: a slit-like depression on the surface of the quadrate bone, a square-shaped premaxillary body, a triangular tapering at the anterior of the maxilla, a relatively shallow antorbital fossa, frontal and jugal processes of the postorbital bone which contact at a right-angle, a postorbital bone with no anterior process, a ventral anterior process of the lacrimal bone. They also describe several autapomorphies of the post-cranial skeleton including: a centrum of the fifth sacral vertebra with an obliquely angled posterior articulation, a large fovea capitis, a large distal condyle of the third metatarsal, a short post-acetabular wing of the ilium, and a lack of a pubic tubercle, a straight ulna and radius, a ridge on the head of the tibia, a lack of paired lateral foramina on the vertebrae, a lack of lateral fossae on the vertebral centra, a straight humeral and femoral shaft, and a high and rounded ilium.

=== Skull ===
Several parts of the skull of the holotype are preserved completely, albeit with very poor preservation quality. This makes some aspects of the skull anatomy difficult to determine, but enough is known that the authors who described it noted several distinct features. There are very few primitive coelurosaurs known from complete remains, however the authors are able to draw numerous distinctions between Zuolong and other Late Jurassic small theropods such as Guanlong, Coelurus, and Tanycolagreus. The skull is overall triangular-shaped, with a significant tapering towards the end of the snout. It has very large orbits which face laterally and a pronounced anterior process of the lacrimal, which gives the appearance of a small crest above the eyes, a trait very common among theropods.

The preserved alveoli of the tooth positions are relatively well-preserved, which led Choiniere and colleagues to estimate that in life, Zuolong likely had a total of four premaxillary and twelve maxillary teeth. Of the teeth which are preserved, one is likely a premaxillary tooth, because it is said to be much smaller than the other preserved teeth. It is d-shaped in cross-section, which is the condition seen in tyrannosauroids, although they are not quite as convex as they are in those taxa. The other teeth which are preserved were badly damaged by the fossilization process, but they do appear to have some serrations. In most other respects, they resemble the teeth of most other theropods; they are long and recurved with cylindrical roots. This is emblematic of a common trend in the skull anatomy of Zuolong which the authors note. It shares numerous skull characteristics with derived coelurosaurs, but also with more basally-branching theropods like carcharodontosaurs and megalosauroids.

=== Post-Cranial Skeleton ===
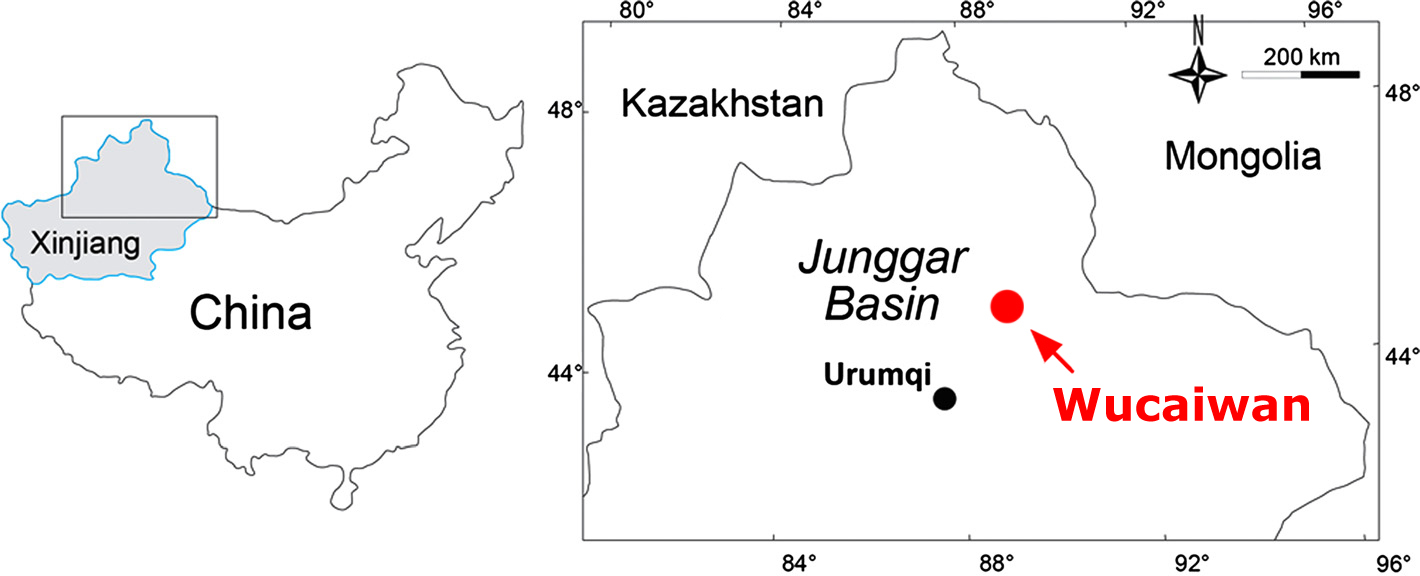
Map showing the Wucaiwan locality in China, where Zuolong was found

Twenty-two vertebrae are preserved, coming from all four vertebral segments. Choiniere and colleagues noted multiple features of the vertebrae of Zuolong which were similar to other theropods from a wide range of clades. For example, the mid-cervical vertebrae possess a posteriorly-projecting lip on the ventral side, which is a condition seen in Monolophosaurus, Allosaurus, and numerous maniraptorans. The cervical vertebrae themselves are also highly elongate, and are more than twice as long as they are tall. However, the authors note that this is actually much shorter than the cervical vertebrae in other primitive coelurosaurs, such as Guanlong and Coelurus, which are more than three times as long as they are tall. The dorsal vertebrae are not as well-preserved as the cervicals, but they are complete enough to determine that they have twin pleurocoels and lack both fossae and foramina on their lateral surfaces. The sacrum is similarly incomplete and was damaged during fossilization, but the authors hypothesized that Zuolong likely had five sacral vertebrae, like most other coelurosaurs. The caudal vertebrae, like the dorsals, lack both fossae and formania on their lateral surface, and they also preserve sharply inclined neural spines, though these are not as pronounced as they are in allosauroids.

The left humerus and radius are both preserved, and the radius is about 88% the length of the humerus, which is a ratio that is conserved across a wide variety of theropods. The manual claws which are preserved are strongly curved and have lateral grooves down their length.

The hip bones display a supraacetabular crest which extends from the posterior end of the acetabulum. This is a common trait in primitive theropods like Cryolophosaurus, but which disappears in derived maniraptorans. The femur is also very different than most coelurosaurs because the head of the femur is oriented about 15 degrees toward the anterior of the animal, unlike in other coelurosaurs, where there it only extends medially from the femur at a 90-degree angle. One of the autapomorphies for Zuolong, the enlarged fovea capitis, is known to be a pathological condition in male turkeys, so the authors say they cannot rule this out as a possibility, although they think it is relatively unlikely and cannot be proven until a second specimen is found.

The other leg bones display a patchwork of characteristics seen in other theropods. The fourth trochanter is much higher up on the femur than it is in more basal theropods, but still not as high as in other, more derived, coelurosaurs. Likewise, the medial side of the distal end of the femur is smooth and does not possess the rugosities seen in that area in tyrannosauroids. The tibia is not complete, so it is not possible to know if Zuolong had a tibia which exceeded the femur in length, which is more common in derived coelurosaurs and is commonly viewed as a cursorial adaptation. The metetarsals are generally similar to other basal coelurosaurs such as Coelurus and Tanycolagreus, however they do have a unique feature in this part of the body which is a flange on the front-medial edge of the distal condyle of the third metatarsal, which is not seen in similar taxa.

== Classification ==
The classification of Zuolong has been uncertain and controversial since its description. Almost every analysis including it in its matrix has recovered this species in a different position. Different hypotheses of its classification can be seen below.

=== As a basal coelurosaur ===
The most common hypothesis of the taxonomy of Zuolong is that it is a basal member of Coelurosauria.

In their description of Zuolong in 2010, Choiniere and colleagues included a wide variety of taxa in their phylogenetic analysis. Zuolong exhibits several symplesiomorphies of coelurosaurs and other theropod groups. The genus is also from a part of the Mesozoic where several theropod groups are known to have originated, so the affinities of Zuolong needed to be tested against a broad range of taxa, including coelophysoids and ceratosaurs in addition to avetheropods. They also included numerous coelurosaurs of uncertain classification in an attempt to use their analysis to resolve the phylogeny hypotheses at the base of Coelurosauria. These included Bagaraatan, Tugulusaurus, Tanycolagreus, and Aniksosaurus, although a few of these taxa were eventually excluded from the final analysis.

The resulting analysis recovered Zuolong within a monophyletic Coelurosauria, but did not resolve any more specific relationships between basal coelurosaurs outside of well-established groups like Maniraptora and Tyrannosauroidea. Their placement of Zuolong as a coelurosaur was based on the following synapomorphies: a maxillary fenestra behind the antorbital fossa, a dorsal ridge of the antorbital fossa formed by the nasal and lacrimal bones, d-shaped premaxillary teeth, maxillary teeth with non-uniform serrations, cervical vertebrae with multiple pleurocoels, a femur shorter than the tibia, a cnemial crest level with the posterior proximal condyle of the tibia, a groove on the ascending process of the astragalus, and a lack of a horizontal groove on the astragalar condyles. Another novel result of this phylogeny included a recovery of Proceratosaurus at the base of Coelurosauria outside the Tyrannosauroidea. A reduced consensus tree compiled from 421 of the most parsimonious trees in their analysis is shown below.

- Coelurosauria
  - Tugulusaurus
  - - Proceratosaurus
    - Tanycolagreus
    - Xinjiangovenator
    - Coelurus
    - Ornitholestes
    - Zuolong
    - Tyrannoraptora
      - Ornithomimosauria
      - Tyrannosauroidea
      - Compsognathidae
      - Maniraptora

In 2020, a group of several authors led by the Brazilian paleontologist Juliana Manso Sayão described a new genus of coelurosaur from the Romualdo Formation, Aratasaurus. They conducted a phylogenetic analysis using the data set presented in a 2012 paper about the anatomy and relationships of Nqwebasaurus, another enigmatic early coelurosaur, some supplementary data about Santanaraptor, and added the recently described Bicentenaria to the dataset.

In the resulting analysis they conducted, they recovered this new taxon as the closest relative of Zuolong. This was based on the synapomorphy that both animals have a ginglymoidal joint at the distal end of the third metatarsal. Both taxa were recovered as basal coelurosaurs, similar to Choiniere and colleagues, based on the following synapomorphies: an antorbital fossa with a dorsal border in lateral view, a medial opening on the ectopterygoid bones of the palate, a d-shaped cross-section of the premaxillary teeth, a rounded surface on the bottom of the caudal vertebrae, a shelf-like fossa on the ilium, and a lack of an anterior process on the pubic boot.

Other novel results of this analysis included finding a paraphyletic Proceratosauridae and recovering Bicentenaria as a relatively derived stem-maniraptoran and the sister taxon of Ornitholestes. A consensus tree compiled from the 1,056 most parsimonious trees is shown below.

- Coelurosauria
  - - Aratasaurus
    - Zuolong
  - - Tanycolagreus
    - Tyrannoraptora
      - Tyrannosauroidea
        - Proceratosaurus
        - - Guanlong
          - - Dilong
            - - Santanaraptor
              - Stokesosaurus
              - Eutyrannosauria
      - Maniraptoromorpha
        - - Ornitholestes
          - Bicentenaria
        - - Compsognathidae
          - - Ornithomimosauria
            - Maniraptora

A recent phylogeny including Zuolong was contained in the paper which described the new taxon Maip, a large megaraptoran from the Late Cretaceous of Argentina by Rolando and colleagues in 2022. They performed two analyses, one which included fragmentary taxa, and one which did not. Although the discussion of their results focused most heavily on its implications for megaraptoran taxonomy, both of their analyses resolved the same relationships for Zuolong and other basal coelurosaurs. The results of their analysis, compiled from a consensus of the 2,560 most parsimonious trees are shown below.

- Tetanurae
  - Allosauroidea (incl. megalosauroidea)
  - Coelurosauria
    - Zuolong
    - - - Nqwebasaurus
        - - Aorun
          - - Ornitholestes
            - Coelurus
        - Tyrannoraptora
          - - Compsognathidae
            - - Tyrannosauroidea
              - Megaraptora
          - Maniraptoriformes
            - Ornithomimosauria
            - Maniraptora

A similar result was recovered by Andrea Cau in his study of theropod phylogeny and ontogeny in 2024.

=== As a basal maniraptoromorph ===
Zuolong is a part of the analysis conducted by Fernando Novas and colleagues in their description of the basal coelurosaur Bicentenaria in 2012. Their phylogenetic analysis was relatively unresolved as a result of coding Santanaraptor as a wildcard taxon, so it was removed from their final analysis. In this analysis, they observed that femur length, which is viewed as a proxy for body size exhibited a continuous two-step decline at the base of Coelurosauria and then again at the base of Paraves. This seemingly unbroken trend was used to classify Zuolong as a stem-maniraptoran based on the size estimates published for the holotype. This decrease in size is also explained as the cause of the rapid diversification of coelurosaurs in the Middle or Late Jurassic.

- Coelurosauria
  - Tugulusaurus
  - - Bicentenaria
    - Tyrannoraptora
      - Tyrannosauroidea
      - Maniraptoromorpha
        - Zuolong
        - - Compsognathidae
          - - Aniksosaurus
            - Maniraptoriformes
              - Ornithomimosauria
              - - Ornitholestes
                - Maniraptora

In 2020, a group of scientists led by Lida Xing from the Chinese Academy of Sciences published their description of a compsognathid, Xunmenglong. Their paper included a phylogenetic analysis based on the data set provided by Choiniere and colleagues in their 2014 description of Aorun. This analysis was unique in its inclusion of a dual analytical framework; the authors of both papers conducted a conventional phylogenetic analysis as well as one which coded several primary characters to account for the ontogeny of the sampled taxa. This was done because the holotype of Aorun was shown by histology to be a juvenile.

This resulted in very different results depending on the analysis used. In the ontogeny analysis, Zuolong is recovered in the conventional position as a very early-diverging coelurosaur outside of Tyrannoraptora. In the conventional analysis, Zuolong is recovered as being within Maniraptoromorpha as the sister taxon of Aorun, although they do not list any unambiguous synapomorphies for this clade. Xing and colleagues use the discrepancy between their two analyses as an example of the need for additional specimens to be described before phylogenetic relationships can be confidently established. The results of both of their analyses can be seen below.

Full Analysis

- Coelurosauria
  - Tyrannosauroidea
  - Tanycolagreus
  - Kileskus
  - Maniraptoromorpha
    - Scipionyx
    - - Tugulusaurus
      - Coelurus
      - - Ornitholestes
        - - Compsognathidae
          - - - Zuolong
              - Aorun
            - - Ornithomimosauria
              - Maniraptora

Ontogeny Analysis

- Coelurosauria
  - Zuolong
  - - - Tugulusaurus
      - Coelurus
    - - Tanycolagreus
      - Tyrannosauroidea
      - Maniraptoromorpha
        - Ornitholestes
        - - Compsognathidae
          - - - Scipionyx
              - Ornithomimosauria
            - Maniraptora

=== As a basal tetanuran ===
Andrea Cau conducted a landmark phylogenetic analysis in 2018 which included hundreds of taxa and sought to resolve the evolution of the avian body plan from the base of Archosauria to the evolution of crown birds. This analysis was replicated by Chris Barker and colleagues in 2020 with similar results. Cau's analysis was assembled over the course of a decade using over 1,400 discrete characters and showed support for the controversial Ornithoscelida hypothesis, which groups theropods and ornithischians as sister taxa to the exclusion of sauropodomorphs. This analysis differs substantially from those conducted by Matthew Baron in 2017 and Paul Dieudonné and colleagues in 2020 by recovering the enigmatic Chilesaurus as a basal member of Tetanurae.

Cau recovered Zuolong as being slightly more basal than Chilesaurus, which itself is found to be the sister taxon of Neotetanurae. He suggests that the discrepancy between his analysis and those of other researchers is a result of different out groups being used, and the analysis itself, which uses out groups extensively sampled from throughout the Avemetatarsalia, is the superior analytical method. Synapomorphies recovered for tetanurans in this analysis include: the loss of the lacrimal shelf which overhangs the antorbital fossa, a contact between the lateral ridge and condyle of the quadrate bone, a vertically compressed cervical vertebrae, a reduced shelf over the acetabulum, a perforation of the pubic apron, a medially-facing head of the femur, and a reduction of the femoral trochlea. Darren Naish and Cau also recovered a basal tetanuran position for Zuolong in their 2022 re-description of Eotyrannus. The consensus tree from Cau's original analysis, compiled from the 3,072 most parsimonious trees, can be seen below.

- Theropoda
  - Coelophysoidea (incl. Dilophosaurus and Cryolophosaurus)
  - Averostra
    - Ceratosauria
    - Tetanurae
      - Zuolong
      - - Chilesaurus
        - Neotetanurae
          - Carnosauria (incl. megalosauroidea)
          - Coelurosauria
            - Aorun
            - - Bicentenaria
              - Compsognathus
              - Sinocalliopteryx
              - Tyrannoraptora
                - Tyrannosauroidea (incl. megaraptora)
                - - Coelurus
                  - - Ornitholestes
                    - Maniraptoriformes
                      - Ornithomimosauria
                      - Maniraptora

== Paleoecology ==
=== Paleoenvironment ===
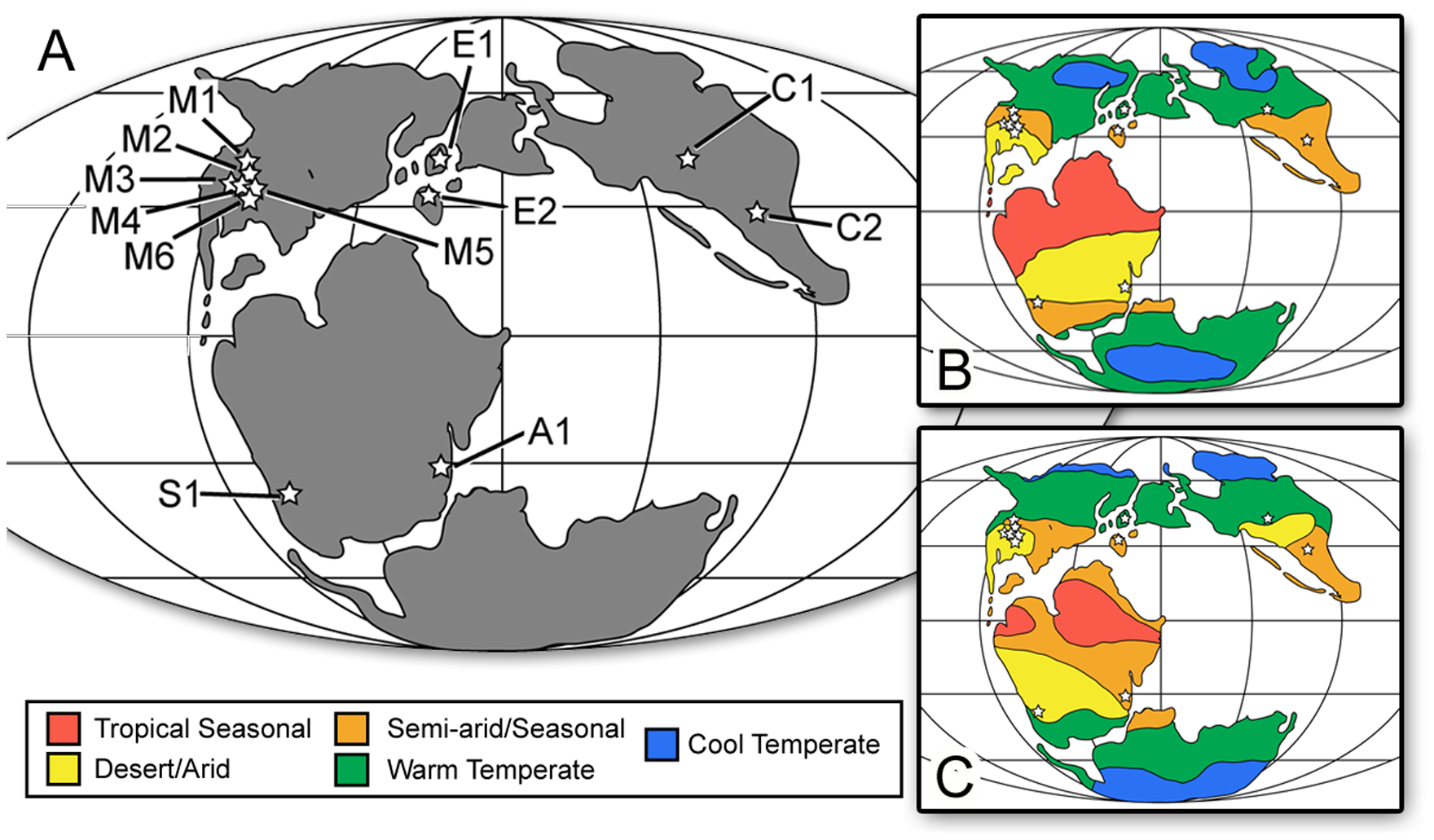
A climatological map of the world during the middle to late Jurassic, with the Shishugou labeled "C1"

The only remains of Zuolong so far described were discovered near the town of Wucaiwan in Xinjiang, China. This locality is a part of the upper member of the Shishugou Formation, which ranges from 164 to 159 million years ago. This interval spans the transition from the Middle Jurassic to the Late Jurassic, though most of it has been recently dated to the Late Jurassic. This region is inland and arid today, but in the Late Jurassic, it formed a coastal basin on the northern shores of the Tethys Ocean.

The lower (or Wucaiwan) member of the Shishugou consists primarily of red mudstone and sandstone deposits. This is interpreted to have consisted of a wooded alluvial fan environment which experienced periodic flooding, which accounts for the wide variety of small-bodied animal fossils preserved in the area as well as the abundance of fossilized trees. The Wucaiwan member preserves fossils of lungfish, amphibians, crocodilians, tritylodonts, and dinosaurs of various sizes. However, the upper portions of this member, where Zuolong was found, are believed to have consisted of more traditional fluvial or wetland environments with less-intense flooding than the lower portions of the member. The climate of the area during the Late Jurassic was temperate and seasonally wet and dry. This pattern of rainfall led to the prominence of seasonal mires, possibly exacerbated by substrate liquefaction by the footfalls of massive sauropods which created "death pits" that trapped and buried small animals.

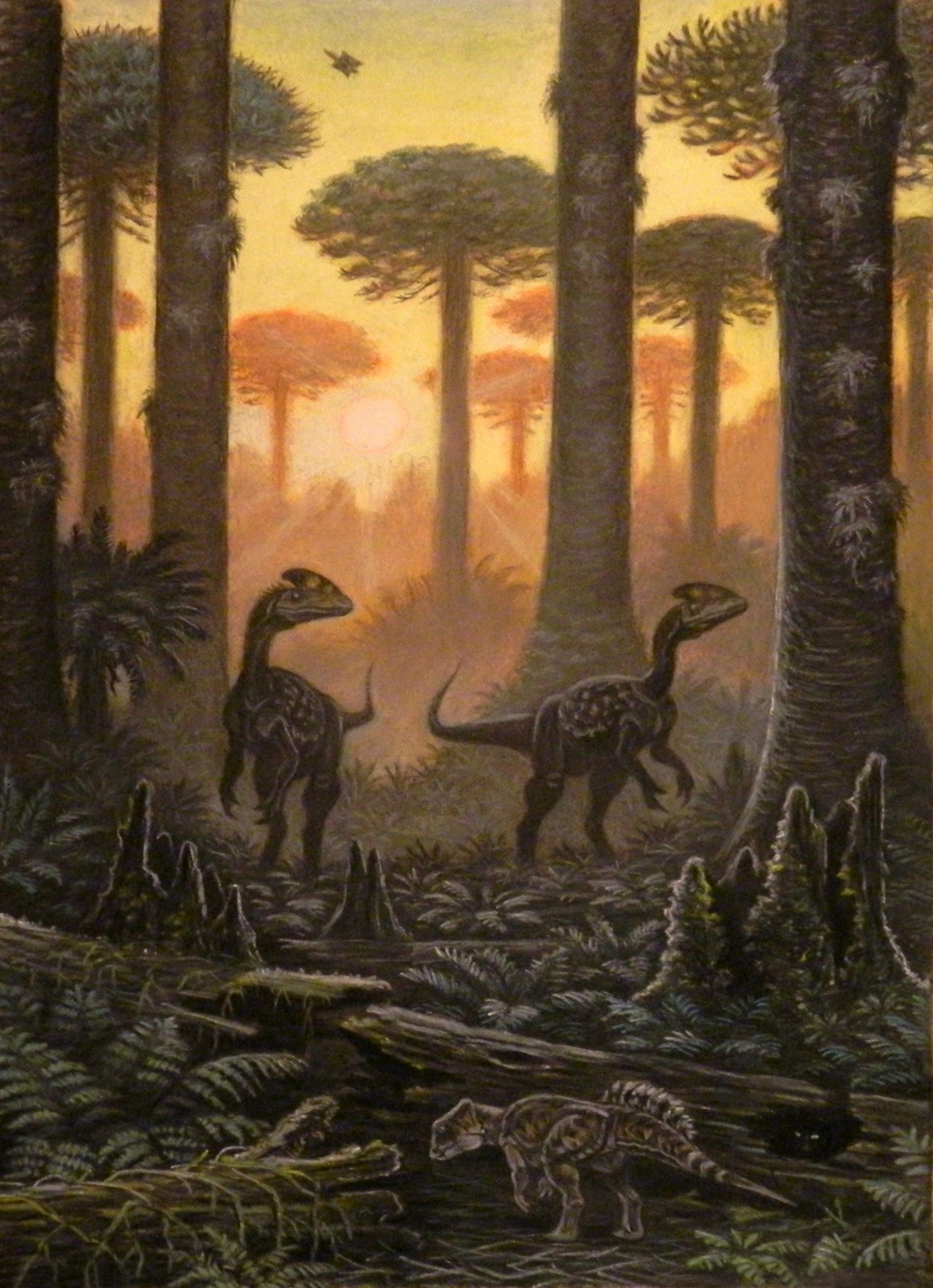
A depiction of some of the animals of the Shishugou Formation in their environment

There have also been significant volcanic ash deposits found in the Wucaiwan member, indicating that volcanic activity in the western part of China was increasing at this time.

=== Contemporary Fauna ===
A variety of small animals have been uncovered from the Shishugou Formation. Various remains of small animals have been referred to various groups but have yet to be given binomial names. These include remains of lungfish, brachyopoid amphibians, docodont and tritylodont mammaliamorphs, lizards, and turtles. Some of these are preserved almost completely and in articulation. There is also a small crocodylomorph which may be related to Junggarsuchus that has yet to receive a formal description or name. Various dinosaur remains that have not yet been named have also been recovered from the area. These include stegosaurs, ankylosaurs, ornithopods, tetanurans, and a putative ornithomimosaur.

Named fossils include the primitive mammal-relative Yuanotherium, the crocodylomorphs Sunosuchus and Junggarsuchus, and the pterosaurs Sericipterus and Kryptodrakon. Dinosaurs are the most common and diverse terrestrial fauna found in the Shishugou. They are represented by small ornithischians such as Yinlong, Hualianceratops, and "Eugongbusaurus" as well as by the sauropods Klamelisaurus, Bellusaurus, and Mamenchisaurus sinocanadorum. All large terrestrial predators were theropods. These ranged from small coelurosaurs like Haplocheirus, Aorun, and Guanlong to large carnosaurs like Sinraptor. Also notable in the area was the small ceratosaur Limusaurus, which was preserved in one of the muddy "death pits".

== See also ==
- 2010 in archosaur paleontology
- Institute of Vertebrate Paleontology and Paleoanthropology
- List of Asian dinosaurs
- Shaximiao Formation and Tiaojishan Formation - roughly coeval fossil-bearing rock formations
- Yanliao Biota
