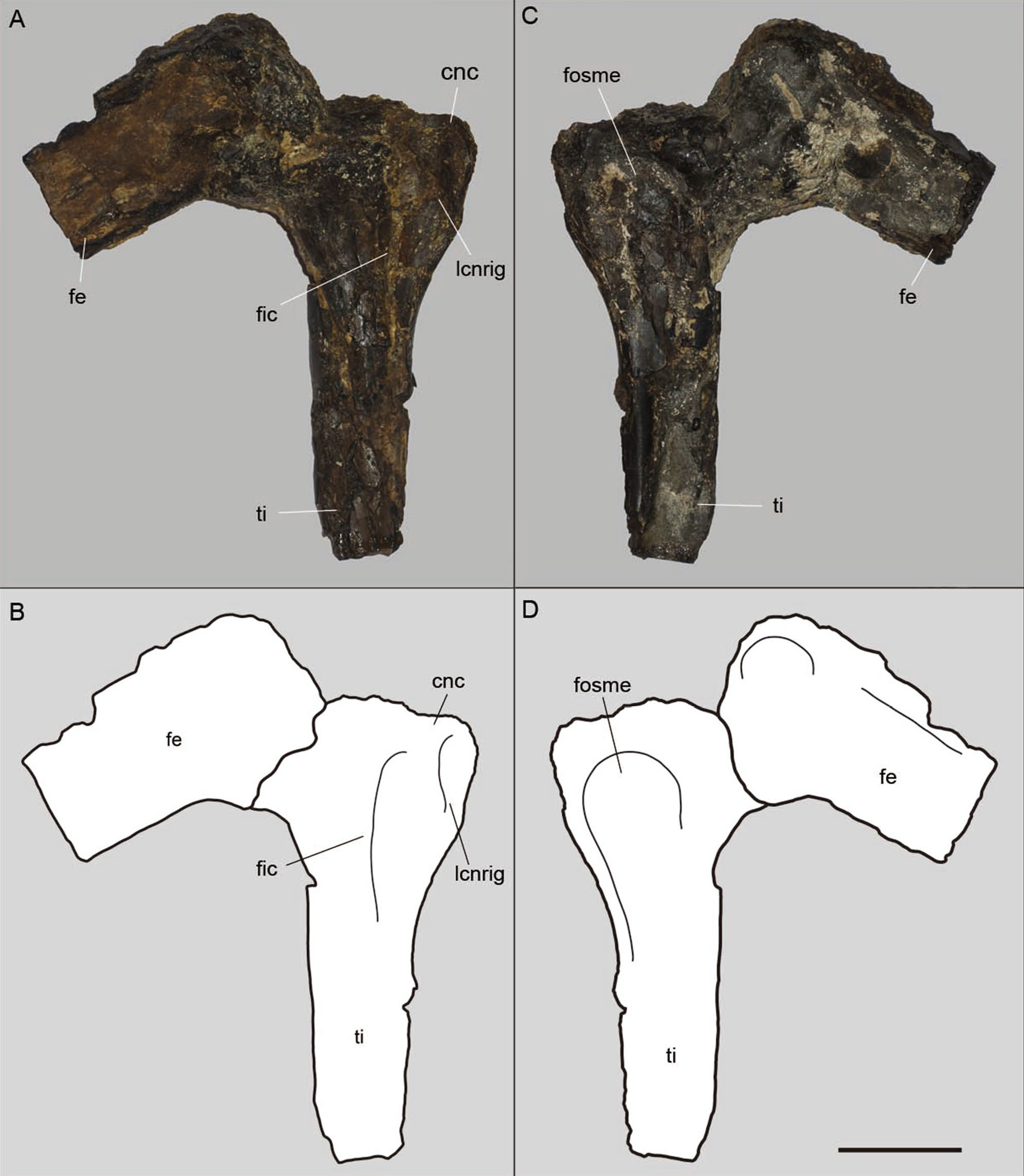
- Holotype femur and tibia

Scientific classification
- Kingdom: Animalia
- Phylum: Chordata
- Class: Reptilia
- Clade: Dinosauria
- Clade: Saurischia
- Clade: Theropoda
- Clade: Coelurosauria
- Genus: †Aratasaurus; Sayão et al., 2020
- Species: †A. museunacionali

Binomial name
- †Aratasaurus museunacionali Sayão et al., 2020

= Aratasaurus =

Aratasaurus Temporal range: Early Cretaceous (late Aptian–early Albian?)

Genus of theropod dinosaur

Aratasaurus is an extinct genus of basal coelurosaurian theropod dinosaur known from the Early Cretaceous (Aptian age) Romualdo Formation of Brazil. The genus contains a single species, Aratasaurus museunacionali, known from a partial right leg. Aratasaurus represents the only tetrapod fossil known from the lower levels of the Romualdo Formation.

== Discovery and naming ==
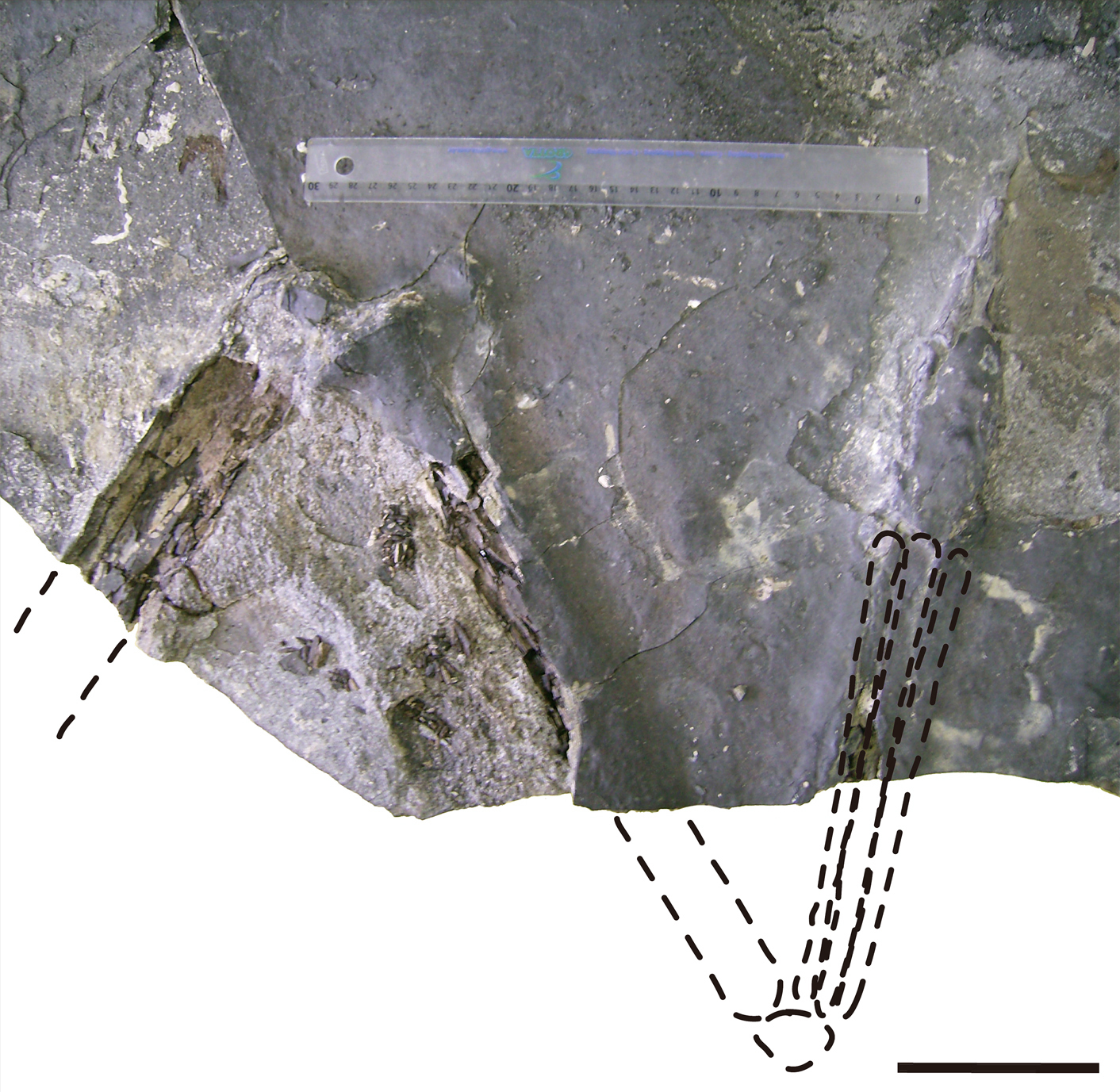
Holotype leg bones before preparation

The Aratasaurus museunacionali holotype, MPSC R 2089, was discovered in 2008 in Mina Pedra Branca, a plaster mine representing outcrops of the lower Romualdo Formation near Santana do Cariri in Ceará state of northeastern Brazil. The specimen consists of a partial articulated right leg, including the distal end of the femur, the proximal end of the tibia, part of metatarsals I–IV, several phalanges, and three pedal unguals. The specimen represents only part of the preserved individual, but the remainder was broken and lost during mining activity.

After its discovery, the fossil was taken to the Plácido Cidade Nuvens Museum of Paleontology to be prepared and described. Between 2008 and 2016, histological sample slices were made of the bones to observe the microscopic tissues. In 2016, the specimen was deposited at the National Museum of Brazil. On September 2, 2018, the museum was heavily damaged in a fire, but the area where the holotype was stored remained intact.

In 2020, Sayão and colleagues described Aratasaurus museunacionali as a new genus and species of early coelurosaurian theropod based on these fossil remains. The generic name, Aratasaurus, combines the Tupi words ara, meaning "born", and atá, meaning "fire", with the Greek σαῦρος (sauros), meaning "lizard". The specific name, museunacionali, honours the fire-devastated National Museum of Brazil, which is the country's oldest science institution. The full binomial name is intended to mean "the dinosaur born from the National Museum fire".

== Description ==
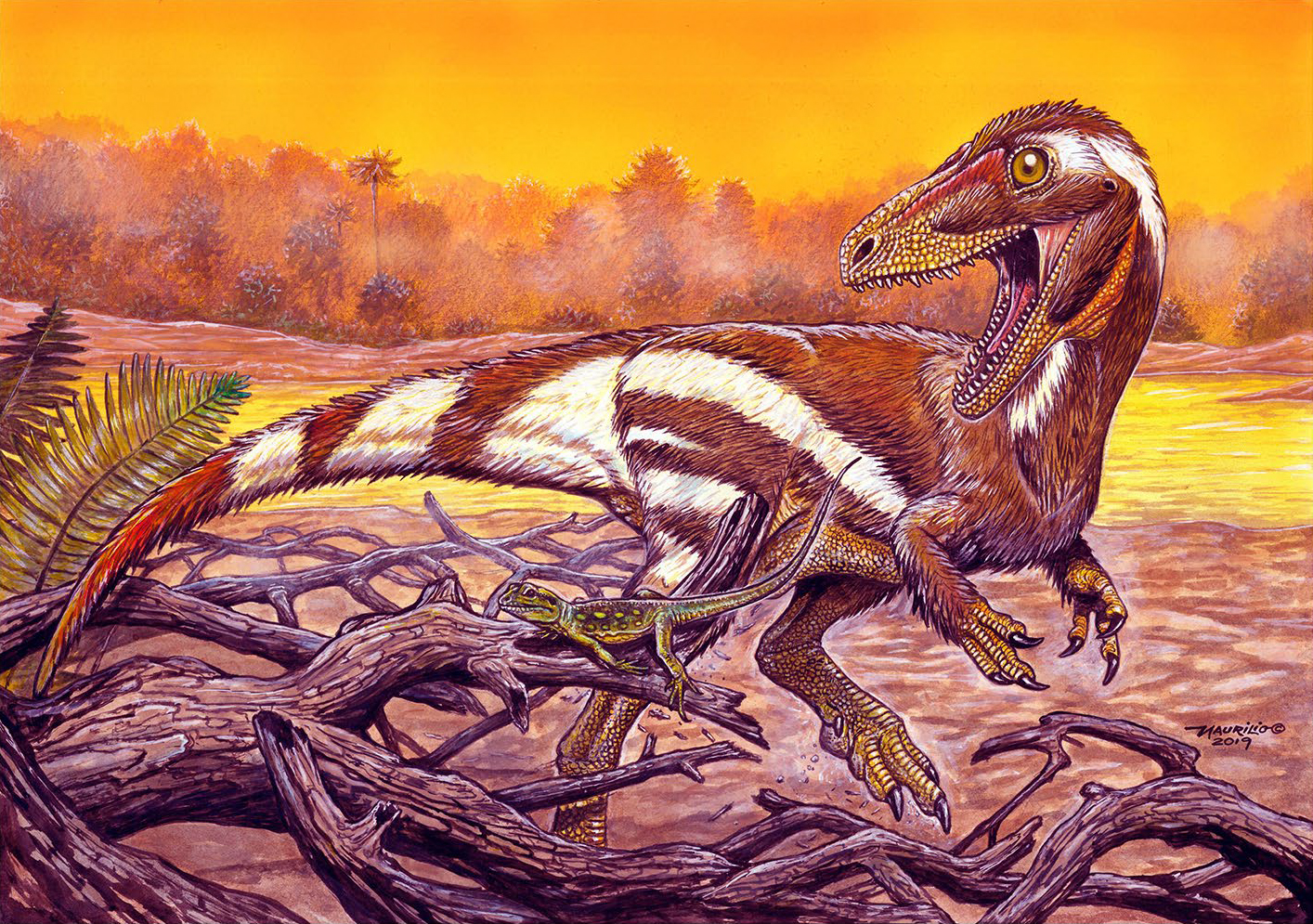
Speculative life restoration

As a coelurosaur, Aratasaurus likely had some form of feather covering, although no integument was preserved in the holotype. Some of the Aratasaurus bones—especially the tibia—compare favorably to Zuolong, a theropod from the Late Jurassic Shishugou Formation of China. The pes is more similar to the Jurassic theropods Aorun and Tanycolagreus. Based on osteohistological studies, Sayão et al. (2020) proposed that the holotype of Aratasaurus represents a juvenile or young adult that was about four years old at the time of its death. It has an estimated body length of 3.12 metres (10.2 ft) and a body weight of around 34.25 kilograms (75.5 lb). However, since the individual was not mature, it would have been able to grow larger.

=== Preserved red blood cells ===
In 2026, researchers identified potential fossilized red blood cells and traces of heme biomolecules in the A. museunacionali holotype. If true, this would be the first time "red blood cells with distinct chemistry related to heme" would have been reported in any fossil, dinosaur or otherwise. When interviewed about the discovery, American paleontologist Mary Schweitzer—who has scientifically reported on preserved blood vessels and soft tissues in fossils—expressed skepticism about the identification of the supposed red blood cells, but noted that the reported collagen amino acids and heme were more convincing.

== Classification ==
In their phylogenetic analyses, Sayão et al. (2020) recovered Aratasaurus as the sister taxon to Zuolong, in the basalmost clade of coelurosaurs. Their results are displayed in the cladogram below:

- Coelurosauria
  - - Aratasaurus
    - Zuolong
  - - Tanycolagreus
    - - Tyrannosauroidea
      - - - Ornitholestes
          - Bicentenaria
        - - Compsognathidae
          - Maniraptoriformes
            - Ornithomimosauria
            - Maniraptora

== Paleoecology ==
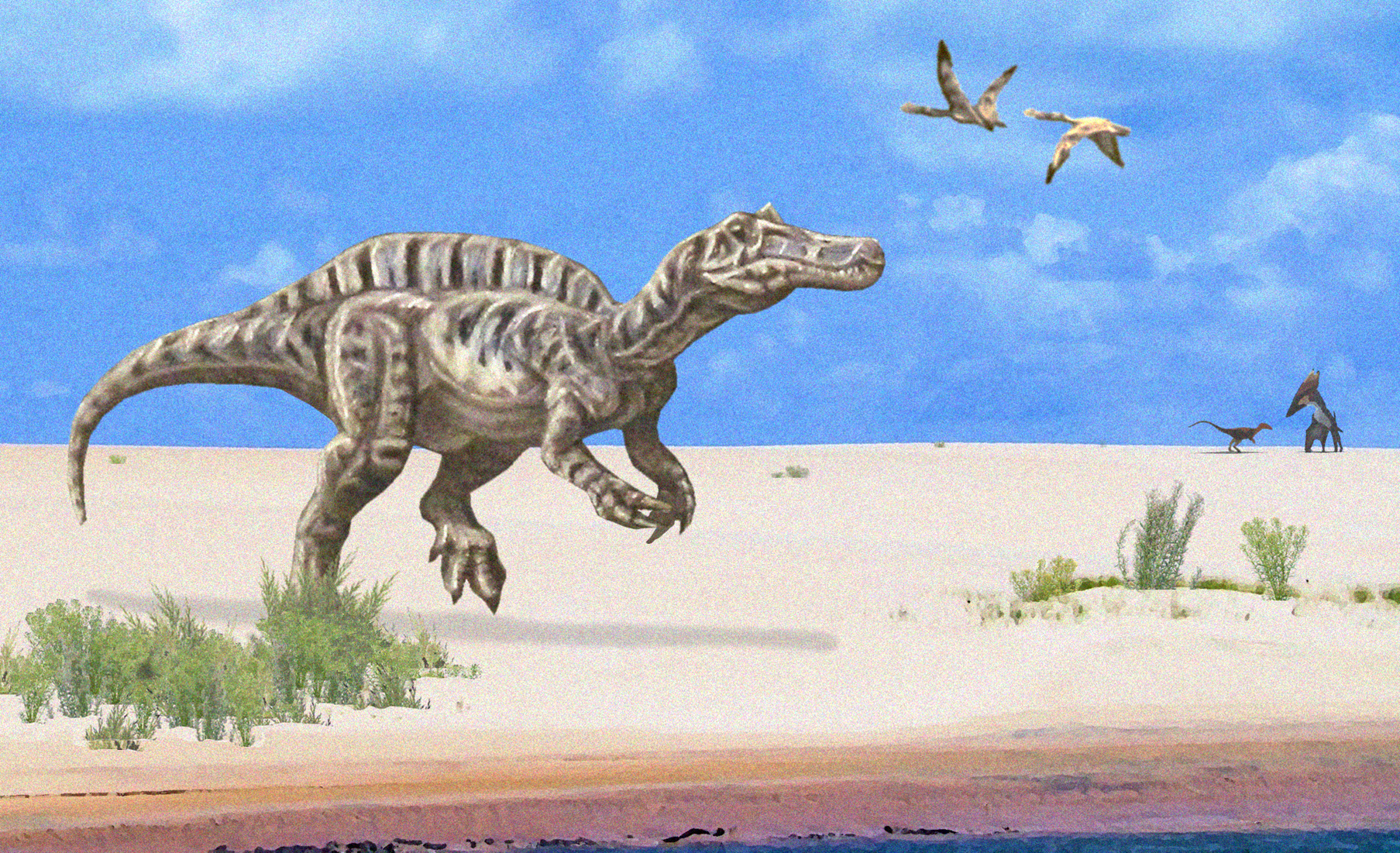
Environmental reconstruction of the Romualdo Formation, including Irritator in the foreground and pterosaurs and a small theropod in the background

Aratasaurus is known from the Romualdo Formation of Brazil, which dates to the Aptian–Albian ages of the early Cretaceous period. It is the only theropod—and the only fossil tetrapod—currently known from the base of the formation, which has an estimated date of 115 Ma. However, at least three non-avian theropods have been named from the upper layers, including the spinosaurine Irritator challengeri and the coelurosaurs Santanaraptor placidus and Mirischia asymmetrica. This formation is very well known for its diverse pterosaur fauna, including abundant well-preserved anhanguerians and tapejarids. Several fossil crocodylomorphs, fish, and turtles are also known from the formation.

== See also ==
- National Museum of Brazil fire
- Zuolong
- 2020 in archosaur paleontology
