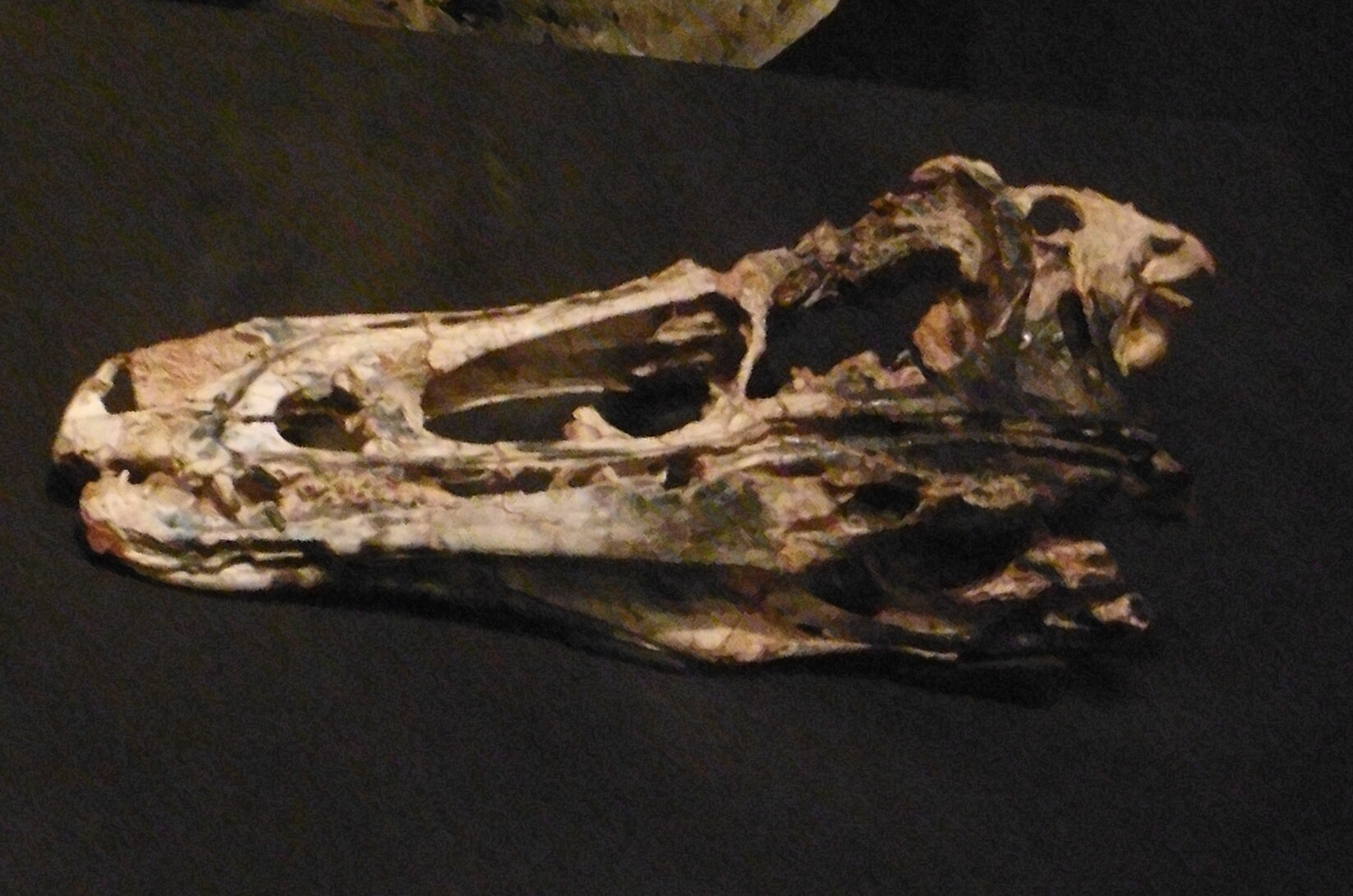
- Holotype skull
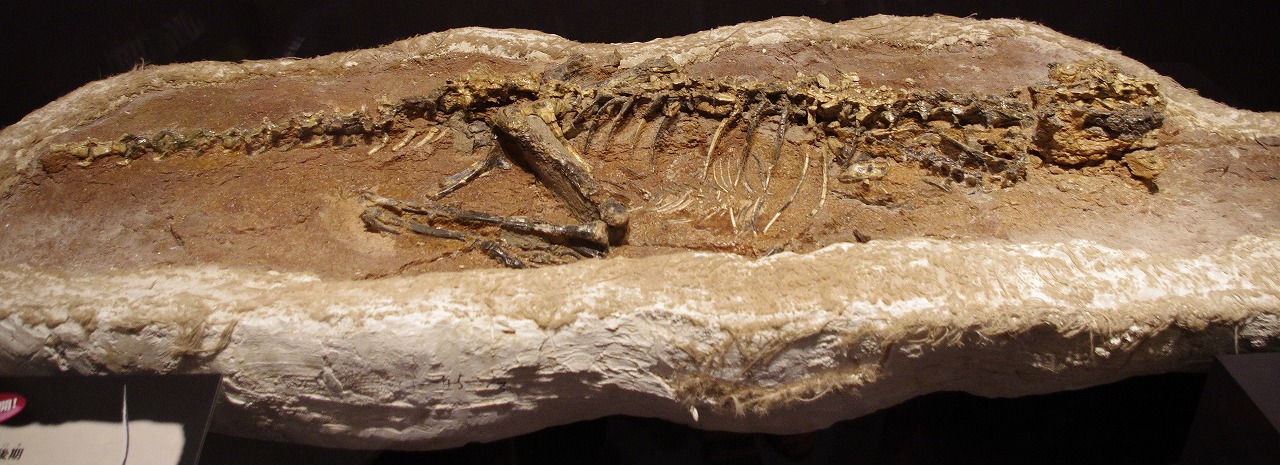
- Holotype postcania

Scientific classification
- Kingdom: Animalia
- Phylum: Chordata
- Clade: Dinosauria
- Clade: Saurischia
- Clade: Theropoda
- Superfamily: †Alvarezsauroidea
- Genus: †Haplocheirus; Choiniere et al., 2010

Type species
- †Haplocheirus sollers Choiniere et al., 2010

= Haplocheirus =

Haplocheirus Temporal range: Late Jurassic ~161.2 to 158.7 Ma - Oxfordian

Extinct genus of dinosaurs

Haplocheirus (/ˌhæplʊuˈkəirəs/, from Ancient Greek ἁπλός (haplós), meaning "simple", and χείρ (kheír), meaning "hand") is an extinct genus of theropod dinosaur from the Middle Jurassic Shishugou Formation of Xinjiang in China. It is generally considered to be an alvarezsauroid, although some researchers have questioned this assignment. The genus contains a single species, H. sollers, which is known from a mostly complete skeleton including the skull.

The quality of the preservation in the only known specimen of Haplocheirus is near-perfect and preserves the animal in three dimensions. This makes Haplocheirus one of the most well-known Jurassic coelurosaurs from anywhere in the world. The specimen has been relatively well-studied in comparison with other comparable taxa like Zuolong or Guanlong, which has allowed researchers to gain insights into the evolution of maniraptorans as well as the sensory capabilities, diet, and ontogeny of primitive coelurosaurs.

== Discovery ==
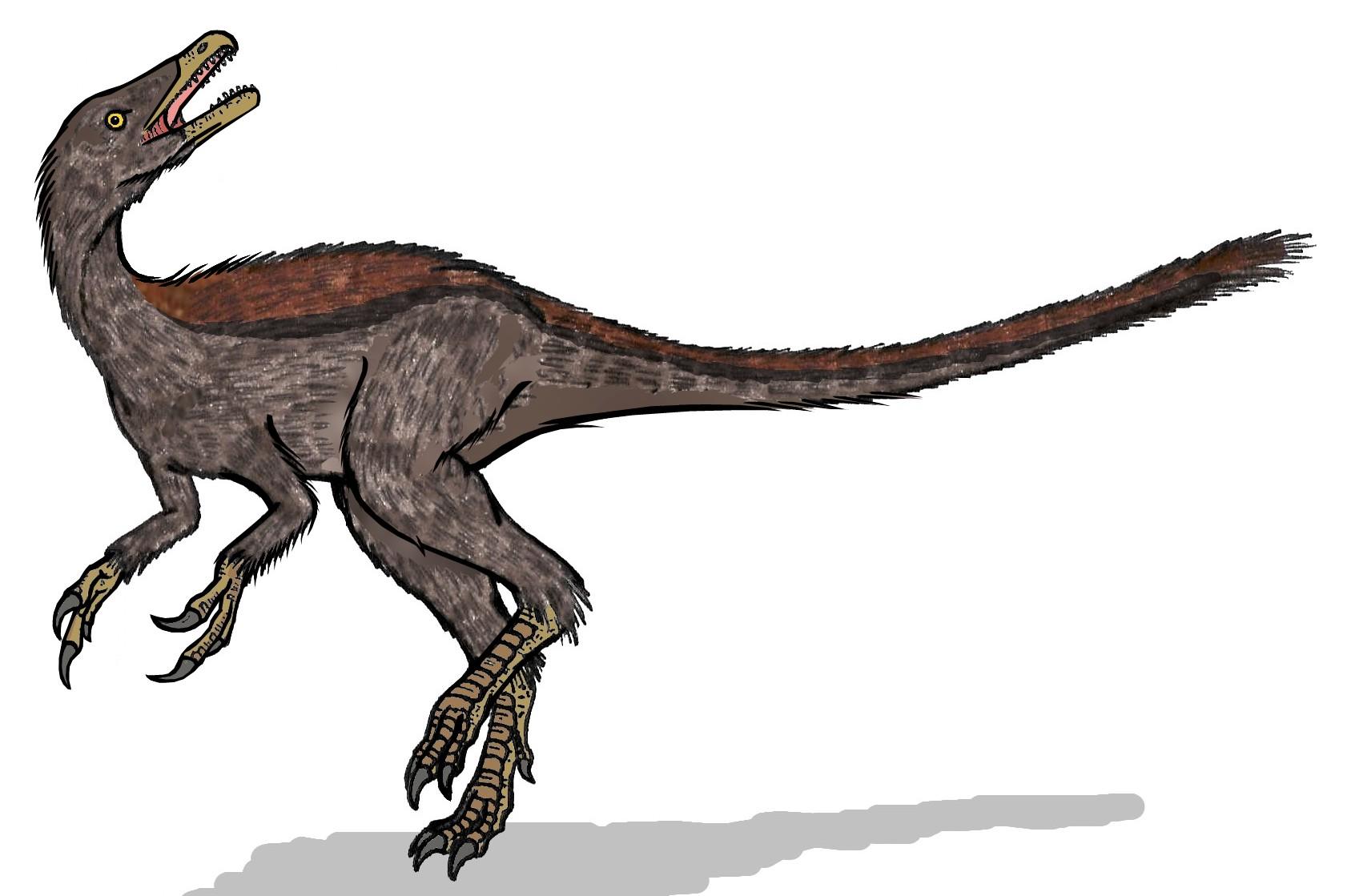
Artist's reconstruction of Haplocheirus

The type and only specimen of Haplocheirus was given the designation IVPP V15988. It was discovered in the orange mudstone "Middle Beds" in the upper part of the Shishugou Formation in the Wucaiwan area of the Junggar Basin. 40Ar/39Ar dating of volcanic feldspar at this locality places it at the span between the Callovian and Oxfordian boundary, and Haplocheirus was discovered in the upper part of this unit, which is interpreted as being Oxfordian in age.

Many of the small theropods known from the Shishugou Formation, such as Guanlong and Limusaurus are known from mired specimens which are believed to have suffocated in mud, Haplocheirus was discovered in a more traditional fine-grained red or brown mudstone. The exceptional preservation quality was noted by the team who described it, and the skeleton is almost perfectly preserved in three-dimensions, with only a few of the distal tail vertebrae missing from the specimen. Subsequent publications have noted that the holotype was also discovered with the articulated remains of a crocodyliform.

The formal description of Haplocheirus was published in 2010 in the journal Science by Jonah Choiniere, Xu Xing, James M. Clark, Catherine A. Forster, Yu Guo, and Fenglu Han. Their explanation of the etymology is that the genus name comes from the Greek words "haplo", meaning "simple", and "cheirus", meaning "hand". The specific epithet, H. sollers is derived from the Latin word for "skillful". Their description was brief, only comprising three pages, but they described several apomorphic features of the skeleton as well as a phylogenetic analysis of the taxon. An amended diagnosis was published by many of the same authors in 2014 along with a detailed osteological monograph about the specimen's skull.

Prior to the discovery of Haplocheirus, the phylogenetic placement of alvarezsauroids was uncertain. Some authors believed them to be the sister group to avialae, while others believed the anatomical similarity to birds were the result of convergent evolution. The similarities between Haplocheirus and other primitive maniraptorans provided evidence that their ancestry was much more conventional and that they were not very closely related to birds, compared to dromaeosaurs and troodontids. The scientists who described Haplocheirus in 2010 were vocal in the literature that the discovery of the genus resolved a wide variety of so-called "paradoxes" that related to the origin of birds. It also narrowed the significant ghost lineage in the evolution of alvarezsauroids which would necessarily exist if they were basal maniraptorans.

== Description ==
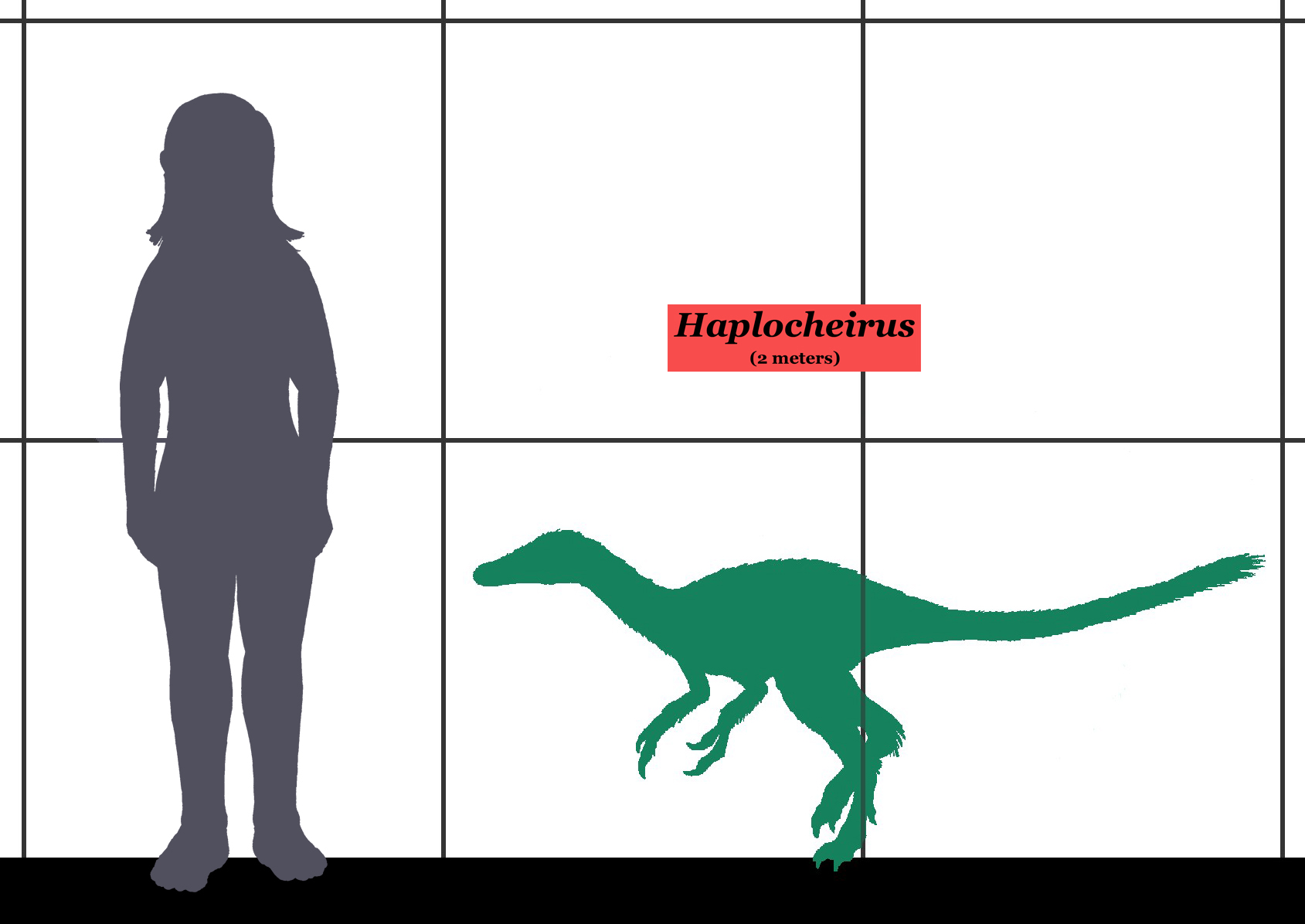
Size of Haplocheirus relative to a human

Haplocheirus was a relatively small coelurosaur, but it was one of the largest alvarezsaurs. Gregory S. Paul estimated that it was about 2 metres (6.6 ft) long and weighed about 21 kilograms (46 lb). Rubén Molina-Pérez and Asier Larramendi gave a similar size estimate to Paul and additionally estimate that it would have been about 60 centimetres (2.0 ft) tall at the hip. Later authors have noted that the holotype is most-likely a juvenile individual, and Zichuan Qin and colleagues estimated that an adult Haplocheirus could have weighed around 41 kilograms (90 lb).

A detailed description of its cranial anatomy was published by several of the same authors who described it in 2014. Several subsequent publications have contained detailed anatomical information, but the genus has not received a comprehensive osteological description.

The general anatomy of Haplocheirus seems to preserve the plesiomorphic condition of maniraptorans in the possession of a long snout and relatively long arms with three claws on each hand. This has led to some confusion in its classification as subsequent researchers have suggested that it belongs to an earlier-diverging coelurosaur clade. It was identified as an alvarezsaur in its original description due to the presence of several unambiguous alvarezsauroid synapomorphies. These included: a long process on the pterygoid bone, a vertically inclined basisphenoid, a large tuberosity within the humerus, a large ectepicondyle on the humerus, a furrow on the surface of the first phalanx of the second finger, and a conical shape to the lateral condyle of the femur.

In their description of the cranial osteology of Haplocheirus in 2014, Choiniere and colleagues provided a revised diagnosis for the genus. It possesses two unambiguous autapomorphies: a twisted ventral edge of the paroccipital process and a 1:2 ratio in the lengths of the third metacarpal to the second metacarpal. It also differs from all over alvarezsauroids by the following apomorphic features: a dorsal expansion of the jugal process of the maxilla, heterodonty, an enlarged fourth dentary tooth, a convex dorsal alveolar margin of the dentary, and serrations on the distal part of the carinae. One of the suggested autapomorphies — a second mandibular fenestra — is believed to have been taphonomic in origin.

=== Skull ===
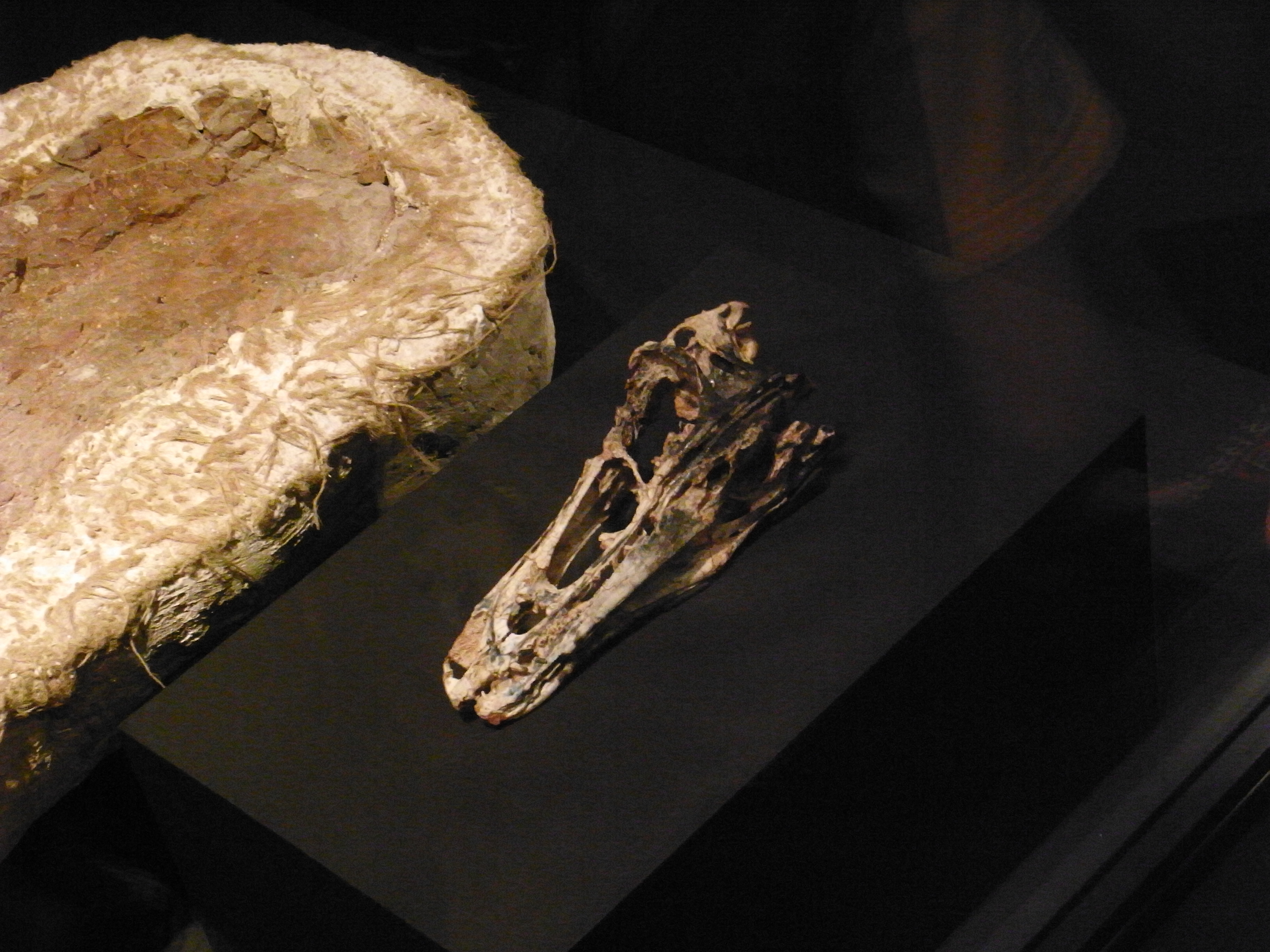
The skull of Haplocheirus after being removed from the matrix

In 2014, Noah Choiniere, James Clark, Mark Norell, and Xu Xing published a follow-up to the original description of Haplocheirus with a detailed monograph on the anatomy of the holotype's skull. The skull itself is almost fully complete and is missing only the right postorbital, half of the parietal, most of the left squamosal, and small pieces of the vomer, left lacrimal, nasals, and left jugal. The braincase and mandible are also almost fully-preserved and are described in detail in the publication.

Haplocheirus is different from derived alvarezsaurids in the presence of heterodont dentition. The premaxillary teeth are circular in cross-section and lack serrations whereas the maxillary teeth are mediolaterally flattened and have serrations along some of their length. The maxillary teeth also decrease in size substantially posteriorly. Haplocheirus possessed four premaxillarly teeth, like most theropods; and at least 30 maxillary teeth and between 30-40 dentary teeth, although some of the alveoli are obscured by the matrix. Very few theropods have tooth counts this high, with the only taxa approaching this total being Pelecanimimus, Shuvuuia, Falcarius, and Byronosaurus.

The skull of Haplocheirus differs considerably from derived alvarezsaurs like Shuvuuia and Parvicursor. It is much more similar to basal members of theropod clades like Ornitholestes, Pelecanimimus, and Nqwebasaurus in the presence of a triradiate jugal bone, a complete postorbital bar, and an ascending ramus of the quadrate which contacts the squamosal. These similarities are possibly the result of Haplocheirus preserving the plesiomorphic maniraptoran skull morphology. The evidence for the alvarezsaurian affinities of Haplocheirus includes the strong inclination of the basisphenoid bone and the long tapering process of the basopterygoids. These traits are very rare outside of alvarezsauroidea, being present in only Gallimimus and the unnamed troodontid taxon represented by the specimen IGM 100/1128. However, some authors believe that these traits indicate closer affinities with ornithomimosaurs or at least that the placement of Haplocheirus as an alvarezsauroid is not very robust.

=== Postcranial skeleton ===
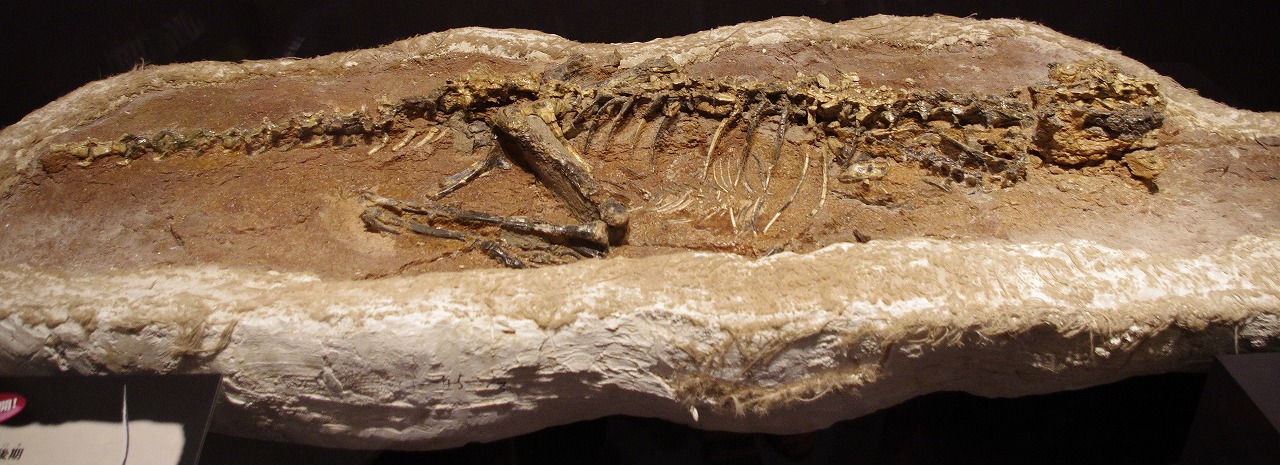
The holotype of Haplocheirus still obscured by the matrix

The type specimen of Haplocheirus is almost fully-complete. It has not received a full osteological description, but its initial description stated that the entire skeleton was present, except for the distal-most caudal vertebrae. It also preserves the ancestral saurischian pubic condition, unlike derived alvarezsaurs, which have the ornithischian pubic condition.

One of the most unique aspects of the postcranial anatomy Haplocheirus is the robust first finger in comparison to the other two fingers. This is intermediate between the generally equally-robust fingers on taxa like Allosaurus and the greatly reduced second and third fingers in Mononykus and its relatives. Haplocheirus also demonstrates a trend towards narrowing the second and third metacarpals, which is believed to be a precondition for the full coossification of these bones in animals like Patagonykus.

Another notable feature of Haplocheirus is that it preserves a transitional state in the formation of the semi-lunate carpal, which characterizes most derived maniraptorans. While several of the carpals are coossified, the resulting structure is asymmetrical due to the presence of a long mediodorsal process. The fused carpals are also not equal in size, with the third distal carpal being significantly smaller than the second.

== Classification ==
In their description of the genus, Choiniere and colleagues conducted a phylogenetic analysis using 98 other theropod taxa. They recovered Haplocheirus as the most basal member of alvarezsauroidea. Their also analysis supported a monophyletic alvarezsauroidea at the base of maniraptora. Prior to their analysis, alvarezsauroids had been recovered either as the sister group of avialae or of ornithomimosauria, but neither of these results were obtained by Choiniere and colleagues. However, they do remark that an affinity with ornithomimosaurs is much more strongly supported than the former hypothesis. Choiniere and colleagues are circumspect about this assignment of alvarezsauroidea and remark that robust results would have to wait for the description of new material. An abbreviated version of the phylogenetic tree displayed in the paper is shown below.

- Maniraptora
  - Ornitholestes
  - - Compsognathidae
    - - Therizinosauroidea
      - Oviraptorosauria
      - Paraves
      - Alvarezsauroidea
        - Haplocheirus
        - Alvarezsauridae
          - - Alvarezsaurus
            - - Achillesaurus
              - Patagonykus
          - Parvicursorinae
            - Albertonykus
            - Mononykus
            - Parvicursor
            - Shuvuuia

Similar phylogenies have been recovered by Steve Brusatte and colleagues in 2014 and by Choiniere and colleagues in a different publication when they described the related genus Aorun in 2013. Xu Xing and colleagues provided further corroboration to this position in 2018 in the description of Bannykus and Xiyunykus, and Kubo and colleagues in 2023 with the description of Jaculinykus, using the same dataset.

However, this classification is not universally accepted. At least two other hypotheses regarding its relationships have been put forward. In their description of the troodontid genus Hesperornithoides, Scott Hartman and colleagues conducted a phylogenetic analysis using 380 taxa and 700 characters which was based on a heavily modified version of the data set used by Brusatte and colleagues in 2014. In this analysis, they recovered Haplocheirus as a compsognathid, however they only published an abbreviated topology in their final publication which did not include detailed trees of the various stem-maniraptoran groups like compsognathidae.

Federico Agnolín and colleagues published a re-analysis of the skull material from Haplocheirus in 2022 and they conducted a phylogenetic analysis as well. They found that the support for the placement of Haplocheirus within alvarezsaurs and within compsognathids was roughly equivalent to the support values of the trees which placed it in ornithomimosaurs. They do not suggest that this implies Haplocheirus was an unambiguous ornithomimosaur, but rather that a robust classification must await the discovery of new taxa or new character information.

== Paleobiology ==
=== Arm function ===
Haplocheirus seems to have been able to use its hands as proficiently as other theropods with similarly proportioned arms and hands. This is only notable in comparison to the much more aberrant morphology of the forelimbs of most alvarezsaurs.

=== Growth and histology ===
The holotype and only specimen of Haplocheirus is believed to belong to a juvenile individual. A histological sample from the holotype was examined by Qin and colleagues in 2021. They identified four distinct lines of arrested growth (or LAGs), which strongly implies that the individual was four-years-old when it died. The holotypes of the closely related taxa Shishugounykus and Xiyunykus are both adults, and they were also sampled histologically and determined to be nine-years-old when they died. From their estimated adult sizes, Qin and colleagues constructed a hypothetical growth curve for basal alvarezsaurs and used it to estimate the adult mass of Haplocheirus. They give a range of between 38 kilograms (84 lb) and 43 kilograms (95 lb) for an adult individual. They also estimate that the ancestral mass of alvarezsaurs to be roughly 23 kilograms (51 lb).

=== Senses ===
A study published in 2021 by several authors including Choiniere, James Clark, Xu Xing, and Roger Benson examined the skulls of various theropods in order to infer the possible range of sensory abilities they possessed. In their findings, they suggested that the large orbits and wide scleral aperture suggest that Haplocheirus and its relative Shuvuuia were adapted for nocturnality. They also remarked that the cochlear canals of Haplocheirus and its relatives were proportionally longer than those of other theropods, which is an adaptation believed to correlate with improved hearing capabilities, and one which is very uncommon in non-avian theropods.

== Paleoecology ==
=== Diet ===
The teeth of Haplocheirus are relatively slender compared with the contemporaneous genera Zuolong and Monolophosaurus, and the narrow morphology of the dentary and rostrum implies that there is a relatively low power-to-velocity ratio. The skull of Haplocheirus is also relatively lightweight due to the large orbits and fenestrae, meaning that it likely could not withstand significant forces. These traits suggest that Haplocheirus primarily fed on small vertebrates. Choiniere and colleagues have also suggested that carnivory is the plesiomorphic condition for Maniraptora and Alvarezsauroidea as a whole.

Some authors have also suggested that the increase in the robustness of the first finger may have been an adaptation for digging in tree trunks for insects, similar to the modern aye-aye. However, other authors have suggested that it was unremarkable in its ecology and likely had a diet very similar to most similarly sized theropods.

=== Paleoenvironment ===
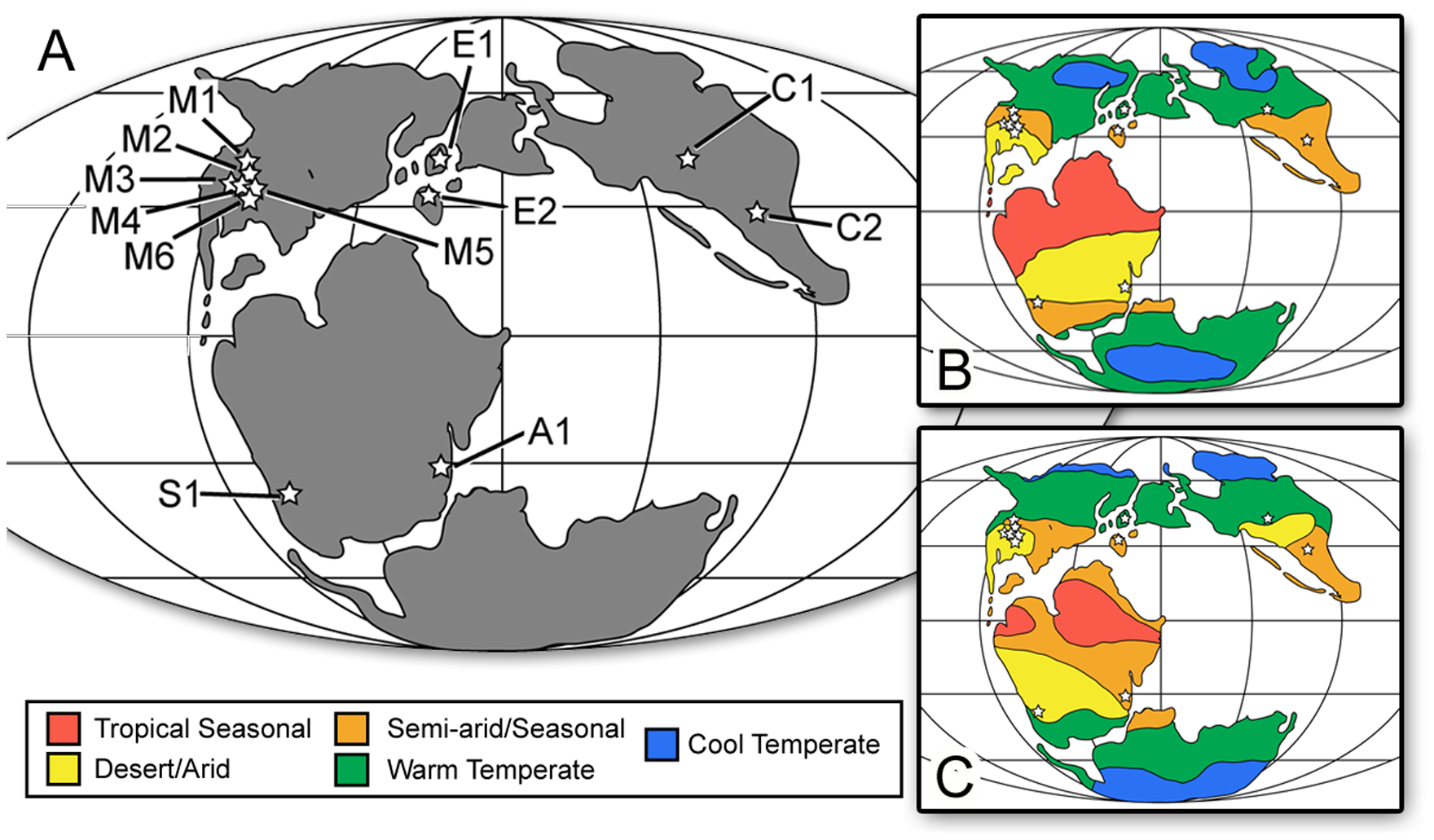
A climatological map of the world during the middle to late Jurassic, with the Shishugou Formation labeled "C1"

The only remains of Haplocheirus so far described were discovered near the town of Wucaiwan in Xinjiang, China. This locality is a part of the lower member of the Shishugou Formation, which ranges from 164 to 159 million years ago. This interval spans the transition from the Middle Jurassic to the Late Jurassic, though most of it has been recently dated to the Late Jurassic. This region is inland and arid today, but in the Late Jurassic, it formed a coastal basin on the northern shores of the Tethys Ocean.

The lower (or Wucaiwan) member of the Shishugou consists primarily of red mudstone and sandstone deposits. This is interpreted to have consisted of a wooded alluvial fan environment which experienced periodic flooding, which accounts for the wide variety of small-bodied animal fossils preserved in the area as well as the abundance of fossilized trees. The Wucaiwan member preserves fossils of lungfish, amphibians, crocodilians, tritylodonts, and dinosaurs of various sizes. However, the upper portions of this member, where Haplocheirus was found, are believed to have consisted of more traditional fluvial or wetland environments with less-intense flooding than the lower portions of the member. The climate of the area during the Late Jurassic was temperate and seasonally wet and dry. This pattern of rainfall led to the prominence of seasonal mires, possibly exacerbated by substrate liquefaction by the footfalls of massive sauropods which created "death pits" that trapped and buried small animals.

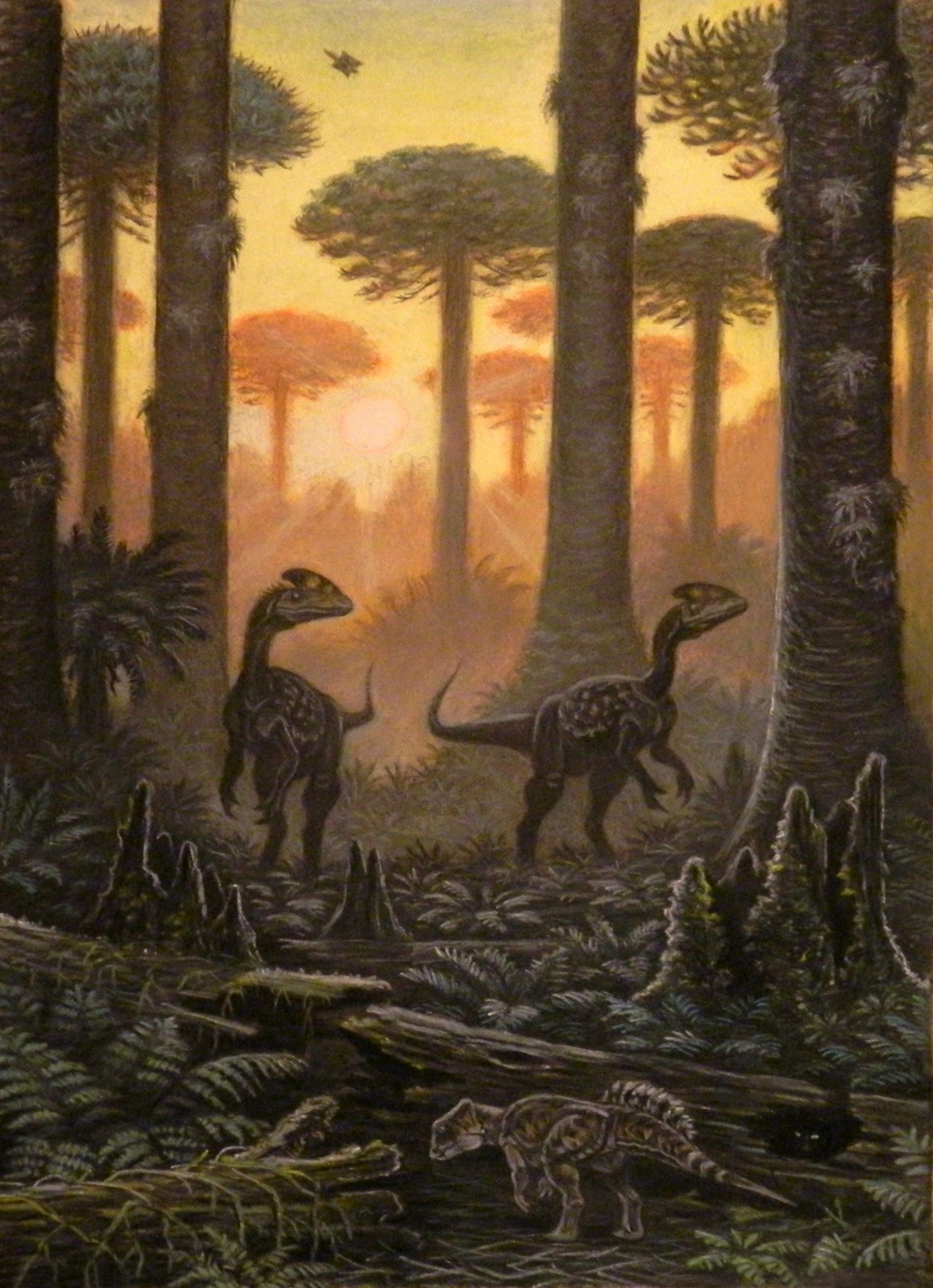
A depiction of some of the animals of the Shishugou Formation in their environment

There have also been significant volcanic ash deposits found in the Wucaiwan member, indicating that volcanic activity in the western part of China was increasing at this time.

=== Contemporary Fauna ===
A variety of small animals have been uncovered from the Shishugou Formation. Various remains of small animals have been referred to various groups but have yet to be given binomial names. These include remains of lungfish, brachyopoid amphibians, docodont and tritylodont mammaliamorphs, lizards, and turtles. Some of these are preserved almost completely and in articulation. Various dinosaur remains that have not yet been named have also been recovered from the area. These include stegosaurs, ankylosaurs, ornithopods, tetanurans, and a putative ornithomimosaur.

Named fossils include the primitive mammal-relative Yuanotherium, the crocodylomorphs Sunosuchus, Nominosuchus, and Junggarsuchus, and the pterosaurs Sericipterus and Kryptodrakon. Dinosaurs are the most common and diverse part of the terrestrial fauna found in the Shishugou. They are represented by small ornithischians such as Yinlong, Hualianceratops, and "Eugongbusaurus" as well as by the sauropods Klamelisaurus, Bellusaurus, and Mamenchisaurus sinocanadorum. All large terrestrial predators in the ecosystem were theropods. These ranged from small coelurosaurs like Zuolong and Guanlong to large carnosaurs like Sinraptor. Also notable in the area was the small ceratosaur Limusaurus, which was preserved in one of the muddy "death pits".

== See also ==
- 2010 in paleontology
- Institute of Vertebrate Paleontology and Paleoanthropology
- List of Asian dinosaurs
- Shaximiao Formation and Tiaojishan Formation - roughly coeval fossil-bearing rock formations
- Yanliao Biota
