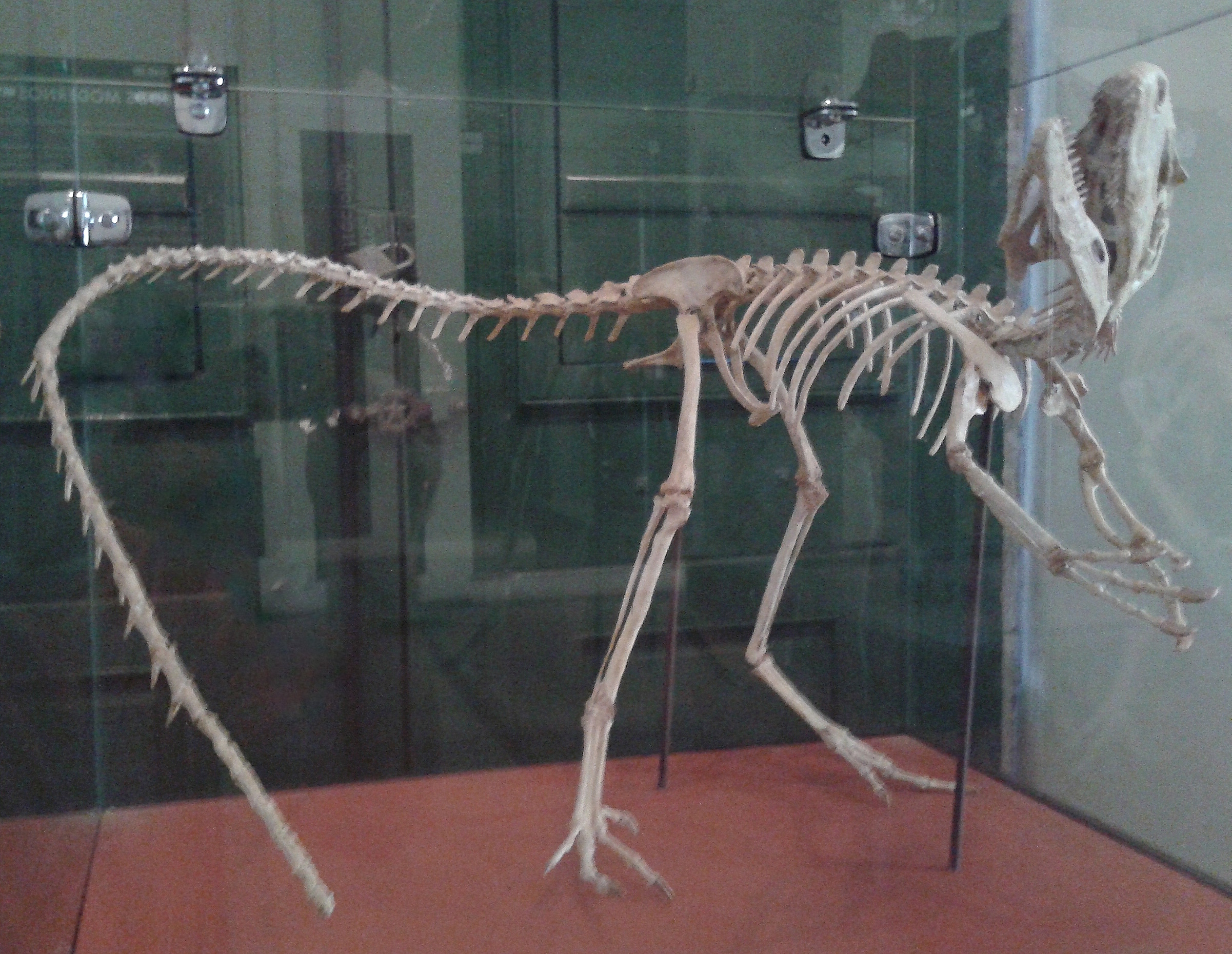
- Reconstructed skeleton

Scientific classification
- Kingdom: Animalia
- Phylum: Chordata
- Class: Reptilia
- Clade: Dinosauria
- Clade: Saurischia
- Clade: Theropoda
- Clade: Coelurosauria
- Genus: †Santanaraptor; Kellner, 1999

Type species
- †Santanaraptor placidus Kellner, 1999

= Santanaraptor =

Santanaraptor Temporal range: Aptian-Albian, 112 Ma

Extinct genus of dinosaurs

Santanaraptor (meaning "Santana Formation thief") is a genus of coelurosaurian theropod dinosaur that lived in South America during the Early Cretaceous (late Aptian-early Albian), about 112 million years ago.

== Discovery ==
The type species is S. placidus, first described by Kellner in 1999. The species epithet refers to Placido Cidade Nuvens, who founded the Museu de Paleontologia da Universidade Regional do Cariri.

== Description ==
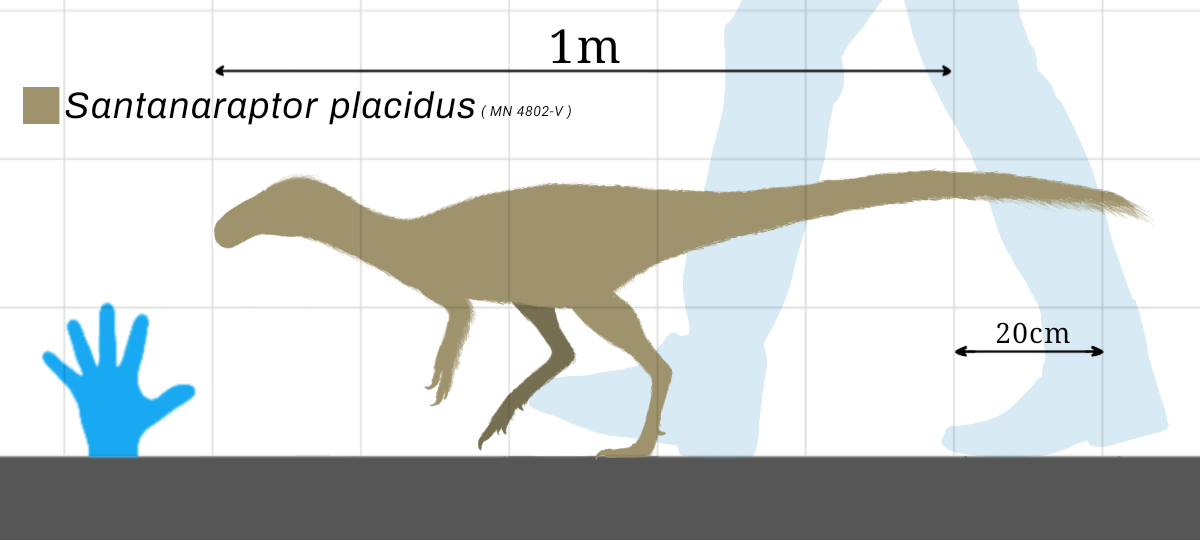
Size comparison

The holotype (MN 4802-V) is a juvenile partial skeleton consisting of three caudal vertebrae with chevrons, ischia, femora, tibia, fibula, pes, and soft tissue. The fossilized tissue includes a thin epidermis, muscle fibers, and possibly blood vessels. Skin impressions under the left foot are also preserved, showing scales. It was unearthed in 1996 from the Romualdo Formation (Santana Group) in the Ceará State, northeastern Brazil. While primarily known from hindquarter elements, the individual represented by the fossil may have reached 1.5 metres (4.9 ft) in length and 15 kilograms (33 lb) in mass. The fossil consists of bones from the pelvis, hindlimbs, and tail. These provide little information on its overall appearance. However, it was definitely a coelurosaur, and a few of its details suggest that it might be a member of the tyrannosauroids. It is presumed to be similar to Dilong and Guanlong in that it had long arms, three fingered hands, and slim hindlimbs.

== Classification ==
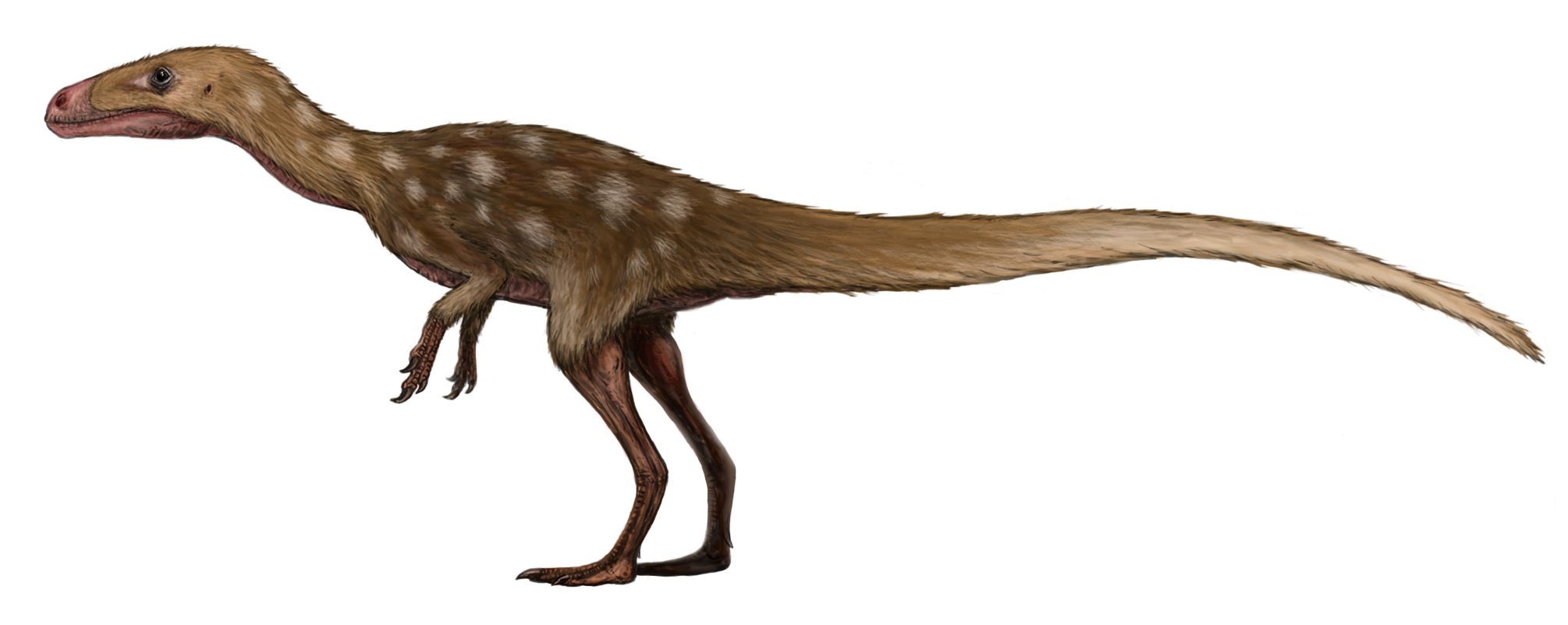
Hypothetical life restoration

Santanaraptor was originally thought to be a maniraptoran theropod when it was first discovered. However, it is now thought to be a basal coelurosaur based on several features present on the femur. Santanaraptor was tabulated by Holtz (2004) as the first tyrannosauroid known from Gondwana, a position also found by Delcourt and Grillo (2018) who recovered Santanaraptor as a tyrannosauroid in all of their phylogenetic analyses based on three different datasets. However, this position has been criticised, as the supposed tyrannosauroid characters are widely distributed in Coelurosauria, and several aspects of the foot are more similar to noasaurids.

In their comprehensive revision of Santanaraptor and Mirischia, Delcourt et al. (2025) recovered the former in two different positions: as a megaraptoran within Tyrannosauroidea based on equal weight phylogenetic analyses and as an early branching maniraptoromorph based on implied weight phylogenetic analyses, forming a clade with Tanycolagreus, Mirischia and Juratyrant outside Tyrannosauroidea.

== See also ==
- Timeline of tyrannosaur research
