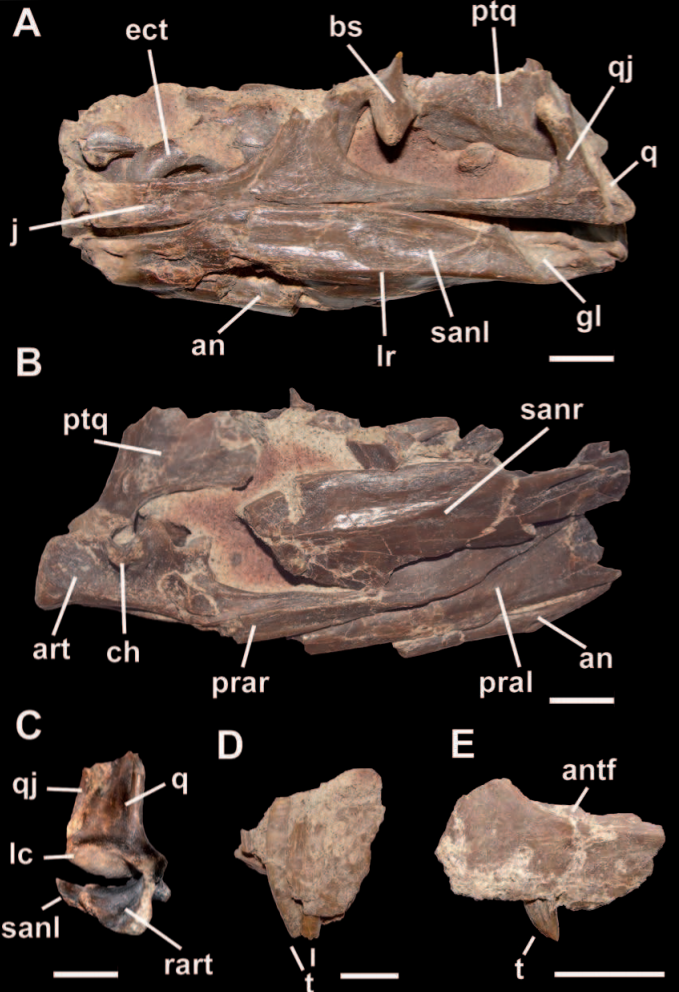
- Holotype skull elements

Scientific classification
- Kingdom: Animalia
- Phylum: Chordata
- Class: Reptilia
- Clade: Dinosauria
- Clade: Saurischia
- Clade: Theropoda
- Clade: Coelurosauria
- Genus: †Bicentenaria; Novas et al., 2012
- Species: †B. argentina

Binomial name
- †Bicentenaria argentina Novas et al., 2012

= Bicentenaria =

Bicentenaria Temporal range: Albian, ~111–106 Ma

Extinct species of reptile

Bicentenaria (meaning "two hundred year anniversary"; named after the 200th anniversary of the 1810 May Revolution in Argentina) is an extinct genus of carnivorous coelurosaurian theropods which lived during the Early Cretaceous (Albian) Candeleros Formation of Argentina. It contains the type species, B. argentina.

== Discovery and naming ==
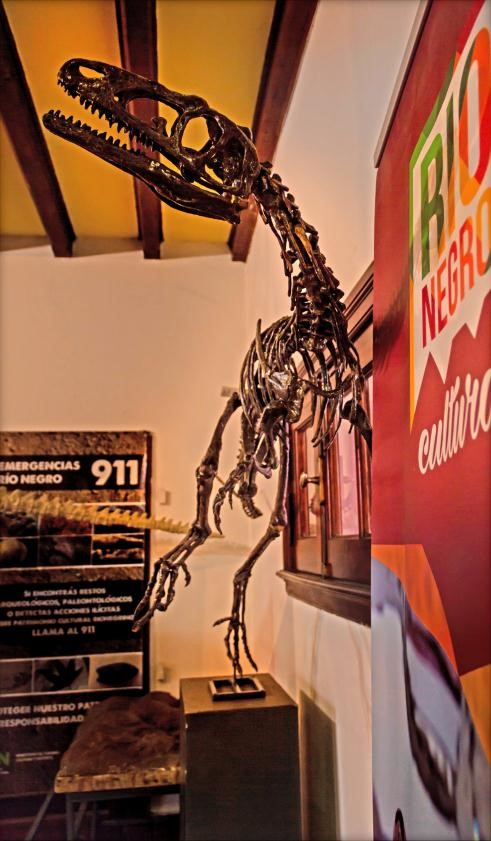
Reconstructed skeleton based on several specimens

In 1998, after a drop in the water level at the Ezequiel Ramos Mexía Reservoir had exposed rocks from the Candeleros Formation, Rauel Spedale and his two friends went on a fishing trip and discovered several bones and claws sticking out of the ground, which were several specimens of Bicentenaria, including the holotype. Spedale excavated the fossils using a pocket knife along with his bare hands, and he believed that he had discovered the remains of a machairodontine.

In 1999 and 2000, Spedale returned to the site, and he subsequently uncovered more bones on an area of only 30 by 40 centimeters with hammer and chisel to a depth of no more than 0.5 metres (1.6 ft), and he exhibited these remains in a display case in his home. The subsequent rise in water level made further excavations impossible, and because Spedale was enthusiastic about the find, he always carried photographs of it in his pocket to show to others. After he showed the photographs to a teacher from a local school, they understood that it was a unique discovery and put Spedale in touch with the paleontologist Raúl Ortiz. Ortiz concluded that it was an unknown dinosaur species and had the finds examined by a team from the Museo Argentino de Ciencias Naturales.

The fossils were determined to have belonged to a new genus of dinosaur, and the name Bicentenaria argentina was first reported in news articles in June 2012, and the paper describing it was formally published in August 2012 by Novas et al. (2012).

The holotype, MPCA 865, consists of the back of a skull and attached to it the back of the lower jaws. The paratype, MPCA 866, is a collection of loose bones from at least four individuals, including parts of the postcrania. It includes: fragments of two premaxillae with three pairs of teeth; a piece of upper right jawbone with a tooth; pieces of seventeen vertebrae; fourteen sacral vertebrae; twenty caudal vertebrae; pieces of two shoulder blades; an upper back corner of a right raven's jawbone; the tops of three ulna; the end of a spoke bone; eight hand claws; pieces of a left femur; five upper shafts of pubic bones; five partial femurs; the tops of two left tibia; the underside of a right tibia; a right tibia; pieces of five metatarsals; fifteen phalanges, separately eight foot claws and pieces of rib.

Size comparison

== Description ==
=== General construction, size and distinctive features ===
Bicentenaria is a rather small bipedal predatory saurian whose body length is estimated at 2.5 to 3 metres (8 to 10 ft) in length.

The describers were able to identify some distinguishing features. The praemaxillary teeth of the anterior upper jaw have only serrations at the base of the tooth crown. The quadratojugal has an anterior branch that is twice as long as the ascending branch. The quadratum has an outer articular nodule at the bottom that is much larger than the inner one. In the lower jaw, the surangulare has a raised upper edge that is trapezoidal in lateral view. The retroarticular protrusion at the back of the mandible is flattened, widened transversely, and spoon-shaped. The humerus has a top that is flattened from front to back and a bottom that shows a deep groove at the front. The hand claws of the outer fingers have posteriorly overhanging leg edges on their posterior top.

=== Skeleton ===
==== Skull and lower jaws ====
The skull shape of Bicentenaria cannot be precisely determined. The preserved pieces of it are quite robust. The praemaxilla bears at least four teeth that have a circular cross-section. Most teeth have no serrations but a second right tooth has serrations on the upper half of the anterior margin. The maxilla has a smooth bone structure on the outside that is further characterized by a horizontal row of large vein canals. The only known maxillary tooth is strongly flattened and has serrations on both the anterior and posterior edges that extend all the way to the apex. Those of the trailing edge are coarser. The cheekbone has a forked posterior branch and at the bottom a slightly sideways facet that joined the lower jaw when the mouth was closed. The quadratojugal has a thin anterior branch that greatly exceeds the ascending branch in length; in most relatives it is shorter. In addition, the ascending branch itself is not particularly short, resulting in a large lower part of the lower sleeping window. The quadratum is robust, without pneumatization and with a small and high-placed foramen quadraticum. The inner articular nodule is greatly reduced, but half as wide as the outer one. The anterior branch of the quadratum is large but plate-shaped.

Of the braincase, only the left processus basipterygoideus of the basisphenoid is known. This protrusion at the bottom has a deep and wide pneumatic hollow, as in Stokesosaurus. The palate is also poorly represented. The ectopterygoid touches the pterygoid on the inside and has a solid hook-shaped protrusion on the outside, the connection to the cranial wall.

The back of the lower jaws is known. The lower jaw probably has an outer lateral window. The surangulare has a protruding and widened top into which a large sphincter fitted, the Musculus adductor mandibulae externus. The back of the surangulare has a triangular profile, bears a raised protrusion that encloses the rather deep lower temporomandibular joint from behind, and protrudes moderately far back. The angular has a distinctive elliptical hollow on the underside. The prearticular partially wraps around that underside. The articular is robust, without pneumatization. It has a robust large retroarticular protrusion, the posterior tip of the bottom that is shaped like a spoon and angled upwards. On the inside, the articular has a smaller protrusion with a notch in the top that allowed a nerve, the chorda tympani, to enter the jaw.

==== Postcrania ====
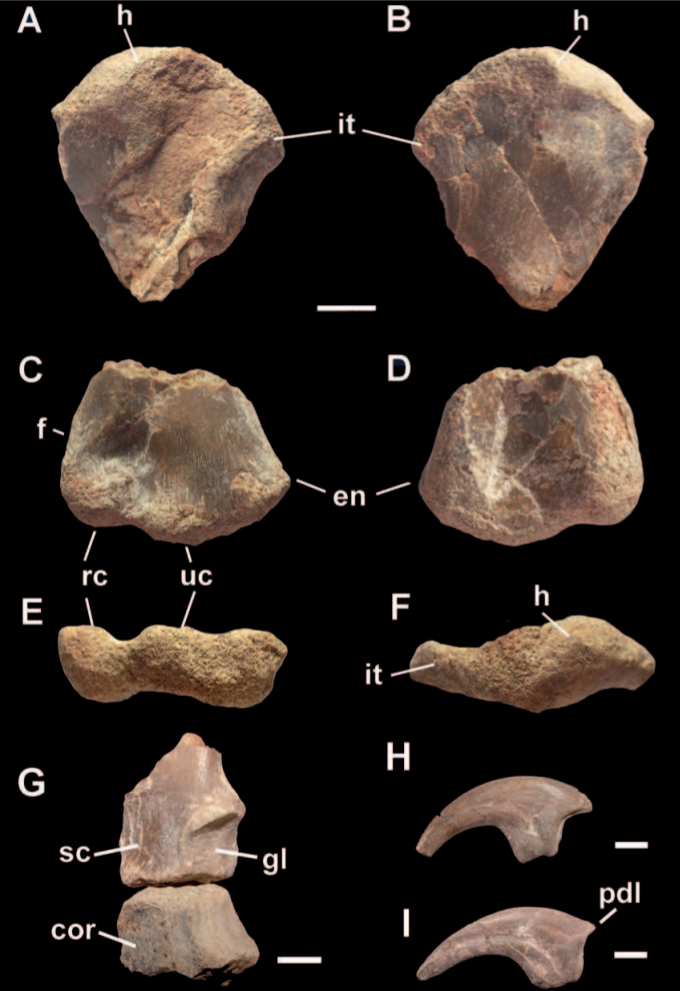
Pectoral and forelimb elements

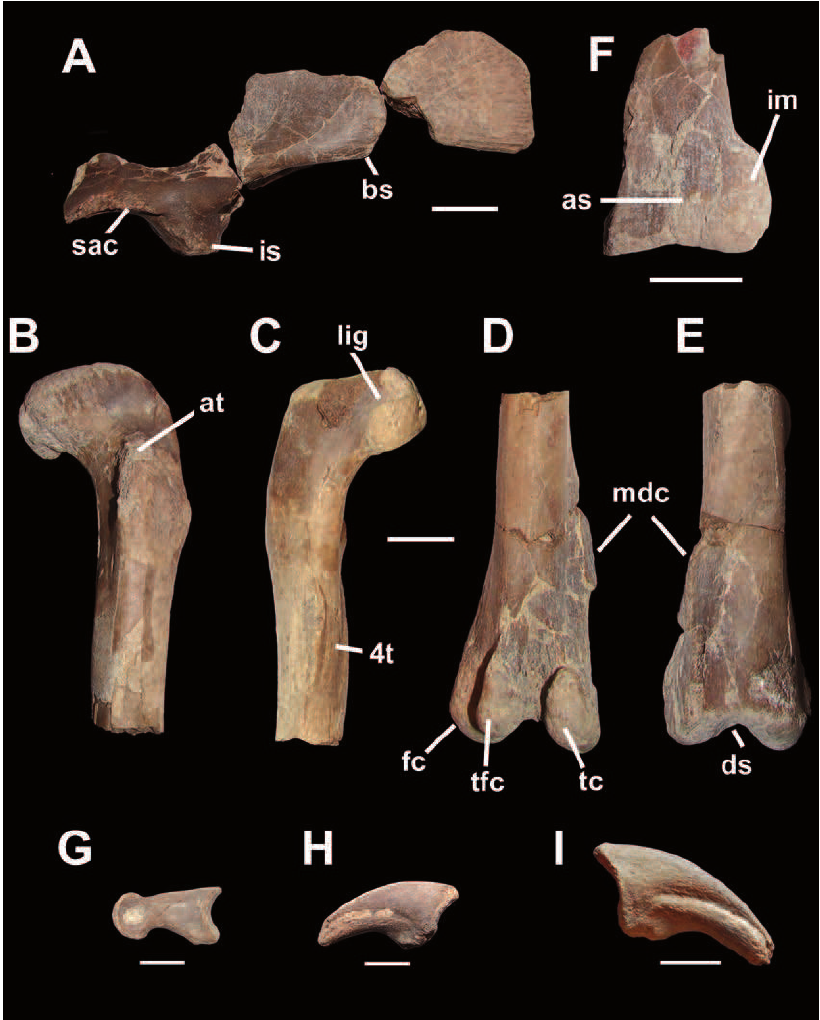
Pelvic and hindlimb elements

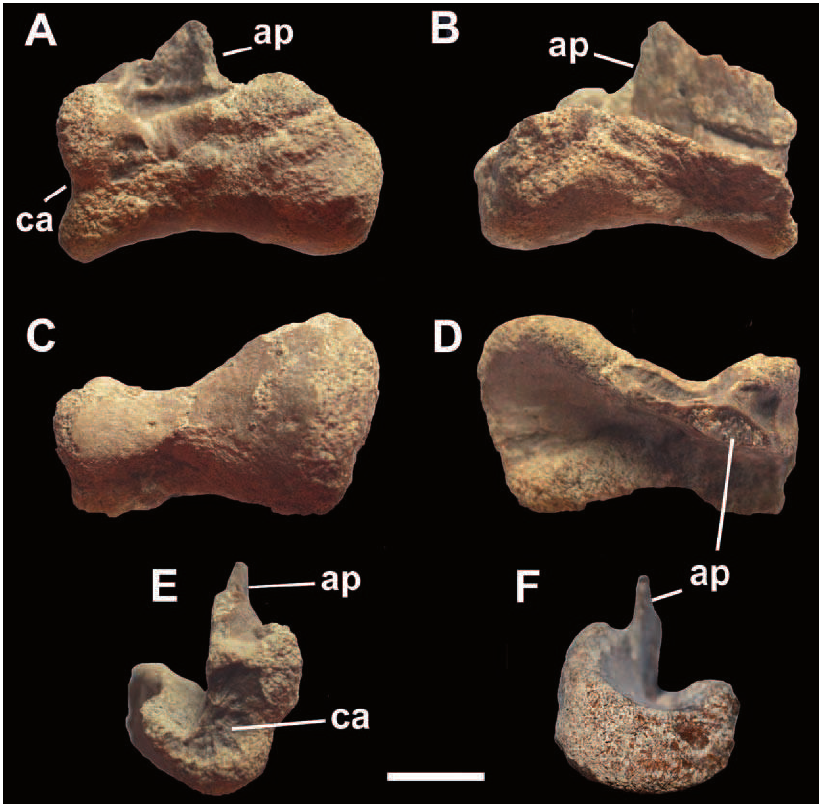
Astralagus

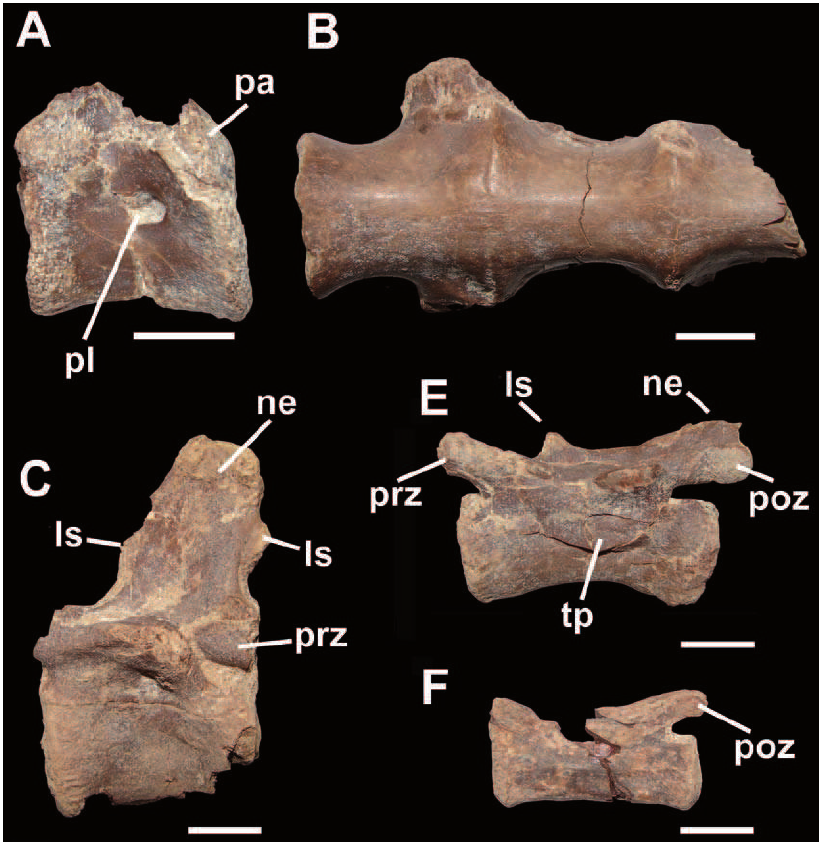
Vertebrae

From the spine, loose vertebrae are known from the back and tail and further sacral vertebrae of the sacrum. Two vertebrae have a sharp keel on the underside and are opisthocoelous: convex from the front and concave from the back. So it is probably about anterior vertebrae. They have a pleurocoel on the sides, hollow with pneumatic opening, behind the parapophysis, the articular surface with the lower rib head. Most of the vertebrae found are amphicoelous: on both sides with a concave vertebral body. These do not have pleurocoles but broken specimens show that they have been hollowed out inside by large air chambers. Their undersides are flat. The longest sacrum found consists of a series of four fused vertebrae; The describers assumed that the total number of sacral vertebrae was in fact five. The sacral vertebrae are robust, not pneumatized and have transversely rounded undersides. The caudal vertebrae have no pleurocoles but do have a longitudinal trough on their underside, bordered by low ridges. The vertebrae of the base of the tail bear long spinous protrusions with roughenings on the anterior and posterior edges for the attachment of tendons. The bases of their side protrusions are hollowed out at the bottom. In all vertebrae of the middle tail found, the articular protrusions have broken off, so it cannot be determined to what extent the tail was stiffened by an extension thereof.

Only fragments of the shoulder girdle are known. The shoulder joint is large and wide, bordered at the top by a raised edge.

The top of a humerus has been found. In the interpretation of the descriptors, this is flattened from front to back rather than having a strong hollow at the front, as is the condition in most theropods. The front is slightly concave and the back slightly convex. The inner corner of the upper edge then protrudes triangularly. The elements found suggest that the humerus is not very robust. Above the lower articular nodule for the spoke bone is a deep and rounded groove. The ulna has a weakly developed processus olecrani, an upper protrusion that serves as leverage to stretch the arm. From the hand, claws have been found that are quite strongly curved and flattened transversely. Some claws have lips and lumps on both the upper and lower posterior edges as attachment for the stretching and flexing muscles. The upper leg lips occur in both very basal and highly derived coelurosaurs; since this occurrence is not common, the descriptors assumed that the trait could count as an autapomorphy, unique derived property, of Bicentenaria.

The ilium has a low but clearly visible vertical ridge above the hip joint. The horizontal ridge on the inside for the attachment of the Musculus caudofemoralis longus is strongly developed and directed slightly downwards; Underneath there is a hollow that thins the leg wall. Between the lower pubic shafts is a well-developed leg apron that begins at the top of the shaft as a sharp ledge.

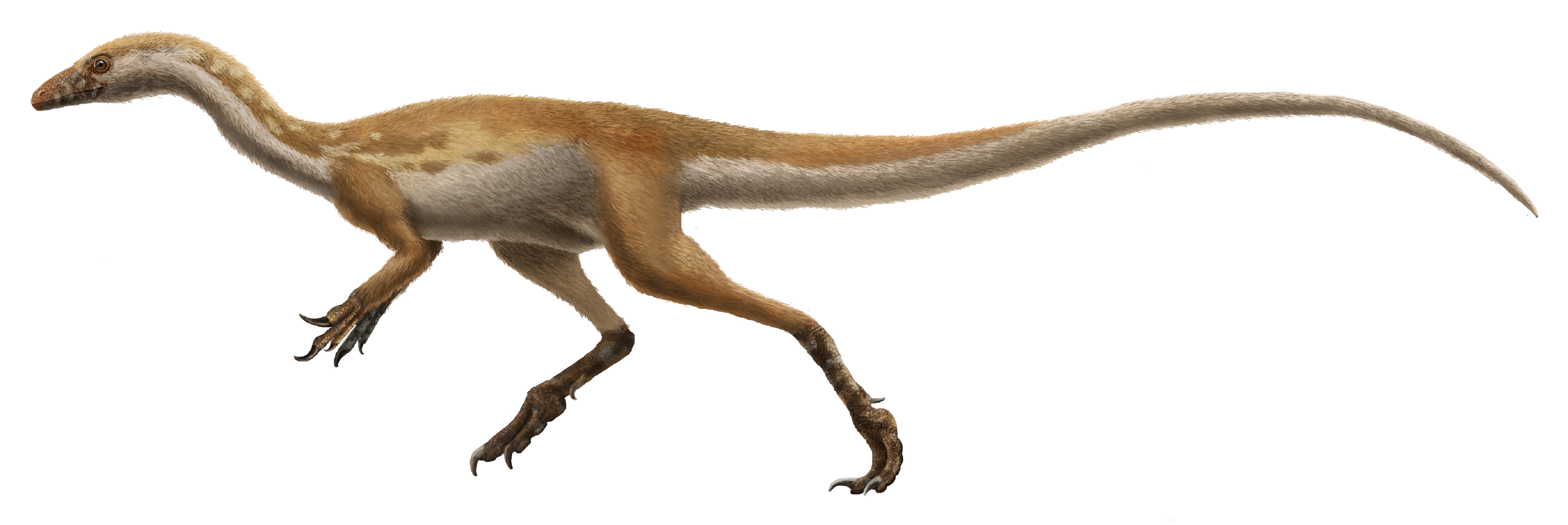
Restoration

== Classification ==
Novas et al. (2012) classified Bicentenaria within Coelurosauria, and was found to be less basal than Tugulusaurus.
