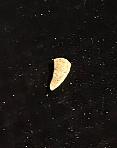
- Lectotype tooth (IVPP V 4024-1)

Scientific classification
- Kingdom: Animalia
- Phylum: Chordata
- Class: Reptilia
- Clade: Dinosauria
- Clade: Saurischia
- Clade: Theropoda
- Clade: Coelurosauria
- Genus: †Phaedrolosaurus; Dong, 1973

Type species
- †Phaedrolosaurus ilikensis Dong, 1973

= Phaedrolosaurus =

Phaedrolosaurus Temporal range: Early Cretaceous, ~130–120 Ma

Extinct genus of dinosaurs

Phaedrolosaurus (meaning "elated lizard") is a dubious genus of coelurosaurian (perhaps dromaeosaurid) theropod dinosaur, based on an isolated and non-diagnostic tooth from the Early Cretaceous Lianmuqin Formation of Wuerho, in the autonomous region of Xinjiang, China.

== Discovery and naming ==
In 1963, geologists were exploring the rocks of the Lianmuqin Formation near the town of Wuerho located within the Junggar Basin of northern Uyghurstan, and they discovered numerous dinosaur fossils. The fossils were excavated in 1964 and brought to the Institute of Vertebrate Paleontology and Paleoanthropology (IVPP) for study.

One of the fossils which was found was a tooth, dating back to the Early Cretaceous, possibly during the Valanginian-Albian stages. The tooth, IVPP V 4024-1, was in 1973 described and named by Dong Zhiming as a new genus and species. The type species is Phaedrolosaurus ilikensis. Dong stated the thirty-one millimetre long tooth was like those of Deinonychus, albeit thicker, shorter, and more solid, with small and dense serrations. He regarded the new genus as a possible dromaeosaurid.

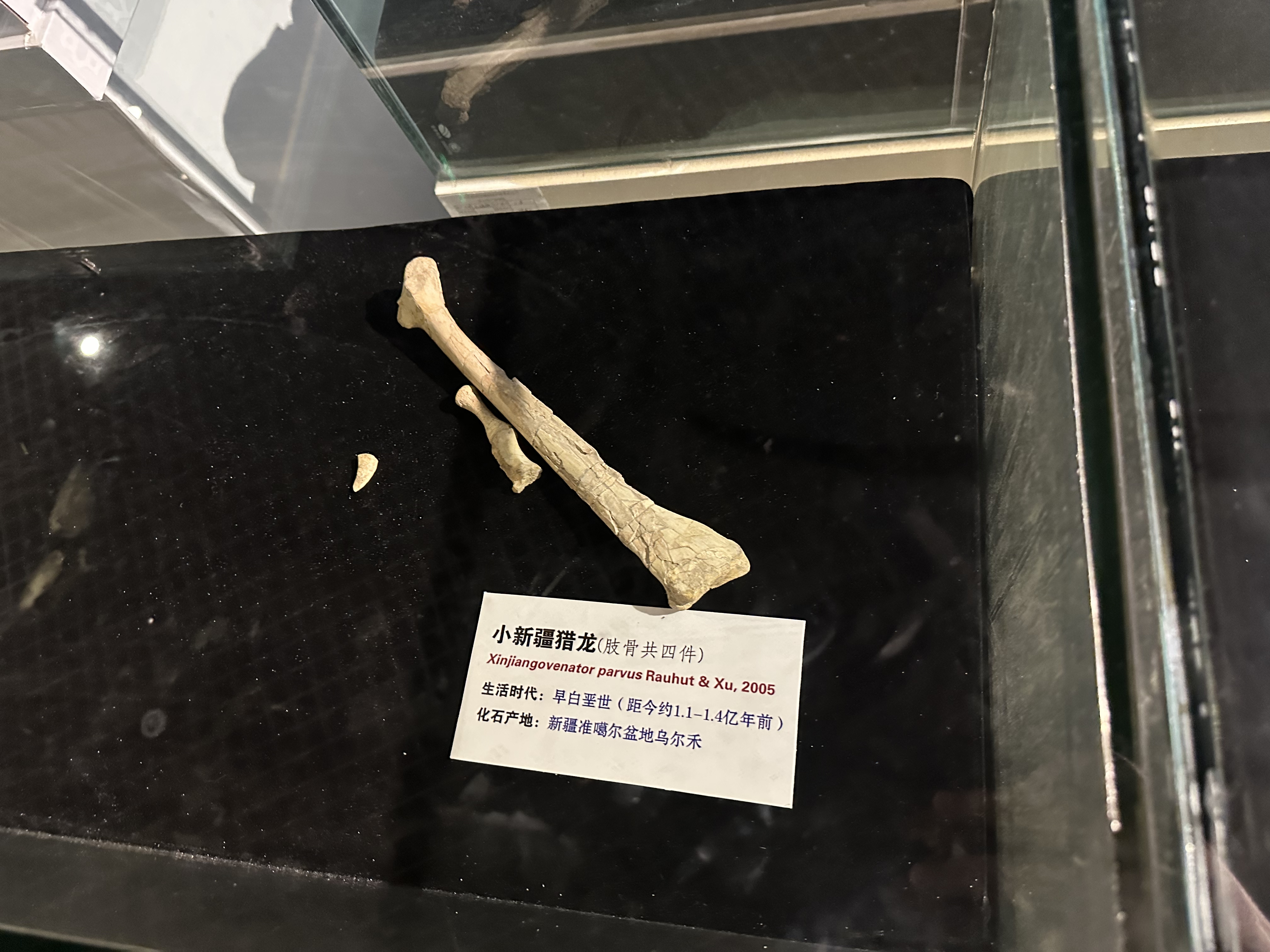
The lectotype tooth alongside the Xinjiangovenator holotype leg and phalanges

As part of the type material of this genus, Dong referred several other skeletal elements from other sites. He believed that since the fossils came from near the same proximity as the tooth, they had belonged to Phaedrolosaurus. Among the material assigned was a partial, articulated right leg. Because this latter limb material showed autapomorphies, distinctive characteristics, and there was no reason to connect it to the non-diagnostic tooth, Oliver Rauhut and Xu Xing in 2005 gave this material its own name, Xinjiangovenator parvus. However, while Dong did not specify any characters which distinguished this tooth from other theropod teeth. Therefore, in 2005, Phaedrolosaurus was classified as a nomen dubium. Because Dong had not designated a holotype among the several specimens in 1973 assigned to Phaedrolosaurus, in 1977 Hans-Dieter Sues had made the tooth the lectotype.

== Description ==
Phaedrolosaurus was likely a small-medium sized theropod, probably around 3-4 meters (9.8-13 ft), and similar to that of a dromaeosaur, which was also first interpreted by Dong. It would've been quite agile and relatively bulky, capable of running at high speeds and probably also having feathers. From the shape of its tooth, it's indicated that the skull of Phaedrolosaurus was rather more strongly built and broad, and not as streamlined as the many other members of the Coelurosauria. Because of the tooth's similarity to those of other dromaeosaurs, Phaedrolosaurus would've likely been similar in size and appearance to other dromaeosaurs. The shape of the tooth also helped determine that Phaedrolosaurus had a carnivorous diet and lifestyle.

== Classification ==
Dong Zhiming had originally described Phaedrolosaurus as a possible dromaeosaurid, based on the robustly built tooth, which bore a resemblance to other dromaeosaurs, such as Deinonychus. In 1977, Hans Dieter-Sues had classified it as an indeterminate member of the Dromaeosauridae. Sues was also the first to regard Phaedrolosaurus as a doubtful name, as the species is based on very limited material.

== Etymology ==
The type and only species is Phaedrolosaurus ilikensis. The generic name, "Phaedrolosaurus" is derived from the Greek φαιδρός, phaidros, "elated", referring to the animal's supposed active lifestyle. The specific name, "ilikensis," refers to the Ilike Formation.

== Paleoecology ==
=== Contemporary Biota ===
Phaedrolosaurus shared its Early Cretaceous environment with many other animals, including the stegosaur Wuerhosaurus, the alvarezsauroids Tugulusaurus and Xiyunykus, the possible maniraptoran Xinjiangovenator, the obscure carcharodontosaur Kelmayisaurus, the primitive ceratopsian Psittacosaurus xinjiangensis, the sauropod Asiatosaurus mongoliensis, a second unidentified sauropod, and an indeterminate ornithomimosaur. Many other animals have also been found in this formation, including the pterosaurs Dsungaripterus, Lonchognathosaurus, Noripterus, and two other indeterminate pterosaurs; a dsungaripterid and an ornithocheiromorph, as well as the crocodyliform Edentosuchus, the dubious plesiosaur Sinopliosaurus, and a wide range of turtles and fish.

== See also ==
Timeline of dromaeosaurid research

1973 in paleontology
