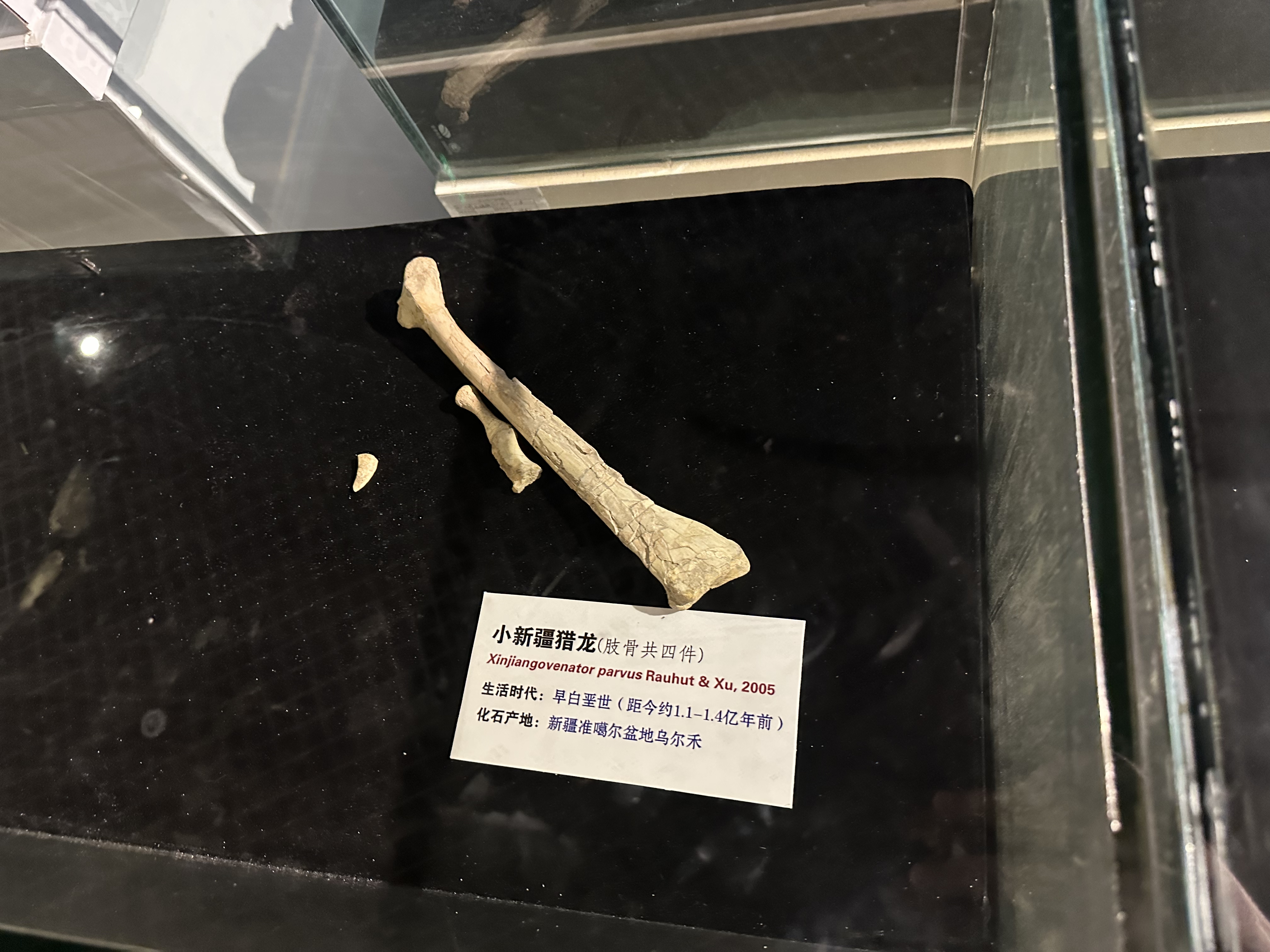
- Holotype bones alongside Phaedrolosaurus lectotype tooth

Scientific classification
- Kingdom: Animalia
- Phylum: Chordata
- Class: Reptilia
- Clade: Dinosauria
- Clade: Saurischia
- Clade: Theropoda
- Clade: Avetheropoda
- Clade: Coelurosauria
- Genus: †Xinjiangovenator; Rauhut & Xu, 2005
- Species: †X. parvus

Binomial name
- †Xinjiangovenator parvus Rauhut & Xu, 2005

= Xinjiangovenator =

Xinjiangovenator Temporal range: Early Cretaceous Valanginian–Albian

Genus of coelurosaurian dinosaur from the Early Cretaceous period

Xinjiangovenator (meaning "Xinjiang hunter") is a genus of coelurosaurian dinosaurs, possibly part of the group Maniraptora, which lived in the Lianmuqin Formation of the Tugulu Group of China, dated to the Early Cretaceous period, sometime between the Valanginian and Albian stages.

== Discovery ==
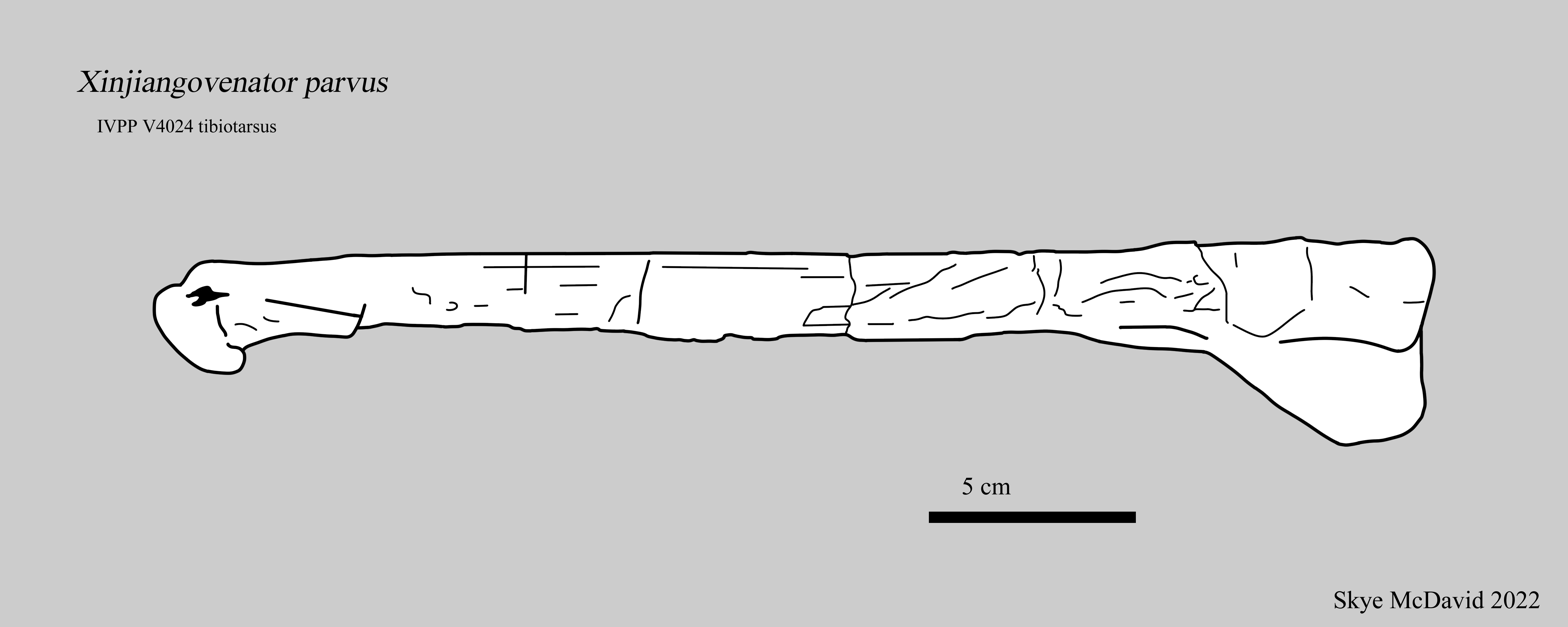
Illustration of the holotype tibiotarsus

The remains of Xinjiangovenator were found in the Lianmuqin Formation of Wuerho, Xinjiang, China, and were first described by Dong Zhiming in 1973. The genus is based on a single specimen, an articulated partial right lower leg, containing the tibia, three pieces of the fibula, the calcaneum and the astragalus, as well as two fused pedal phalanges. This specimen, IVPP V4024-2, is the holotype of the genus.

The holotype was originally thought to be another specimen of Phaedrolosaurus. However, Phaedrolosaurus is based only on a non-diagnostic tooth, so the hindlimb bones were given their own genus by Oliver Rauhut and Xu Xing in 2005. The type species is Xinjiangovenator parvus. The generic name is derived from the autonomous region of Xinjiang and Latin venator, "hunter". The specific name parvus means "small" in Latin.

The lower leg (tibia plus ankle bones) has a length of 31.2 centimetres (12.3 in). Gregory S. Paul estimated in 2010 that individuals of this genus had a length of 3 metres (9.8 ft) and a mass of 70 kilograms (150 lb). Rauhut & Xu (2005) established two autapomorphies (unique derived traits) that could be used to characterize Xinjiangovenator. First, the lateral condyle (outer ankle joint) at the lower end of the tibia extends further backwards than the outer edge of the portion of the tibia near the knee. Secondly, the proximal part of the fibula (near the knee) has a longitudinal groove along its front edge.

== Classification ==
Rauhut & Xu (2005) originally placed Xinjiangovenator within the coelurosaur subgroup Maniraptora using a phylogenetic analysis. It was considered to be more closely related to paravians such as dromaeosaurids and birds, rather than oviraptorosaurians and therizinosaurs. This placement was justified by the presence of a tall and wide ascending process of the astragalus bone. In addition, the fibular condyle of the femur expanded backwards and the fibula tapered drastically towards the ankle. These characteristics were also found to be present in the coelurosaur Bagaraatan, and Rauhut & Xu (2005) suggested that Xinjiangovenator and Bagaraatan were sister taxa.

The 2010 description of Zuolong by Jonah Choiniere, James M. Clark, Catherine Forster, & Xu Xing found a different position for Xinjiangovenator in their phylogenetic analysis. Due to its fragmentary nature, Xinjiangovenator was found to have an unstable position within Coelurosauria. Some, but not all, of the phylogenetic trees found Xinjiangovenator as the sister taxon to Ornitholestes based on the proximal part of the tibia being just as wide along its front edge as its rear edge. When Xinjiangovenator was removed from the analysis, Ornitholestes was found to be a basal maniraptoran.
