= Lianmuqin =

Town in Xinjiang, China

Lianmuqin or Lemjin (Chinese: 连木沁; pinyin: Liánmùqìn, Uyghur: لەمجىن) is a town in Shanshan County, Xinjiang. It is located on China National Highway 312 about 20 km west of Shanshan Town (Shanshan County's county seat), on the way to Turpan.

Located in the northern foothills of the Flaming Mountains, Lianmuqin is known for a number of paleontological finds. The Lianmuqin Formation is named after it, with the most well known discovery from the formation being the Caracharodontosaurid Kelmayisaurus, and the Subashi Formation, after the nearby village of Subashi (42°55′11″N 89°44′36″E), which, however, is part not of Lianmuqin Town but of Tuyoq Township (Tuyugou Township).
