= Nagnajit =

In several ancient Indian texts, Nagnajit appears as the name of a king or kings who ruled Gandhara and/or neighbouring areas. Some texts also refer to Nagnajit as an authority on temple architecture or medicine. According to one theory, all these references are to a single person; another theory identifies them as distinct persons.

== Literary mentions ==
- Aitareya Brahmana describes Nagnajit as a king of Gandhara. He and other kings receive instructions from the sages Parvata and Narada regarding the substitute of Soma. The other kings include Somaka Sahadevya, Sahadeva Sarnjaya, Babhru Daivavrdha, and Bhima Vaidarbha.
- Shatapatha Brahmana describes Nagnajit as the king of Gandhara, naming Svarjit as his son. The text quotes his opinion regarding to the construction of a sacrificial altar, but rejects it because he belongs to the ruling class, not the priestly class.
- Kumbhakara Jataka, a Buddhist text, describes Naggaji or Naggati (Nagnajit) as the king of Gandhara and Kashmir, with his capital at Takshashila. He embraces Buddhism along with other kings - Dummukha of Uttara-Panchala-rashtra, Nimi of Videha, Karandu of Kalinga, and Bhima of Vidarbha.
- Uttaradhyayana-sutra, a Jaina text, describes Naggai (Nagnajit) alias Silaraha as the ruler of Pundra-vardhana in Gandhara. The text mentions Dummukha of Uttara-Panchala-rashtra, Nimi of Videha, and Karandu of Kalinga as his contemporaries. It states that Naggai renounced the world and achieved liberation.
- Uttaradhyayana-tika, a commentary on Uttaradhyayana-sutra, states that king Silaraha came to be known as Naggai after he married a beautiful damsel living on a mansion on a mountain, and started visiting her every fifth day. The king later built a city and Jaina shrines on the mountain.
- Avashyaka-churni, a Jaina text, describes Naggai as the ruler of Purusha-pura (present-day Peshawar).
- Mahabharata describes Nagnajit alias Subala as an incarnation of the demon Ishupad (or Ishupa), and a disciple of Prahalada. He has a son named Shakuni, and a daughter named Gandhari. Karna goes to Giri-vraja (located in the north-west), and defeats Nagnajit and others. Krishna defeats the sons of Nagnajit. The Karna-parvan section of the text suggests that Nagnajitah were a people distinct from the Gandharas.
- Harivamsha Purana describes Nagnajit alias Subala as an ally of Jarasandha; Nagnjit is embarrassed when Krishna defeats Jarasandha in a combat. Nagnajit's daughter Satya is one of the seven wives of Krishna.
- There are several references to Nagnajit as a scholar on temple architecture, sculpture, and painting:
  - Matsya Purana describes him as one of the 18 padeshakas on Vastu Shastra.
  - Varahamihira's Brhat Samhita mentions Nagnajit's recommendations on temple architecture. Utpala's commentary on Brhat Samhita names Nagnajit as the author of Prasada-lakshana and Pratima-lakshana, and quotes stanzas from his works.
  - A Sanskrit-language treatise on painting - variously called Chitra-lakshana, Nagnajichchitra-lakshanam, or Nagna-vratam - survives in its Tibetan version, although the original text is now lost. The text contains three chapters, attributed to Nagnajit, Vishvakarman, and Prahlada. The first chapter - attributed to Nagnajit - contains a legend about the origin of painting. This legend mentions a king named Nagnajit who defeats naked pretas (supernatural beings) during a battle against Yama to revive the son of a Brahmin, and thus earns the name Nagna-jit (Sanskrit for "Conqueror of the naked"). He eventually becomes the first man to draw a portrait. Later in the chapter, the title Nagnajit seems to refer to Vishvakarman.
  - Utpala cites Nagnajit's Chitra-lakshana in his commentary on Brhat Samhita, but this text is about weapons, not painting. Historian Ajay Mitra Shastri considers various possibilities: (1) the Tibetan text contains only a part of a larger treatise attributed to Nagnajit (2) there were multiple texts titled Chitra-lakshana attributed to Nagnajit (3) the Tibetan text is erroneously attributed to Nagnajit.

Some texts on Ayurveda mention Nagnajit as an authority on medicine:

- Bhela Samhita describes Nagnajit as a saintly king (rajarshi) of Gandhara, who asks Punarvasu about the effects of poison.
- Vagbhata's Ashtanga-hrdaya refers to Nagnajit and other authorities on Ayurveda in connection with the effects of poison.
- Indu's commentary on Ashtanga-sangraha calls Nagnajit Daruvahin, and refers to his opinion on the effects of poison.
- Kashyapa-samhita mentions Daruvaha, describing him as a rajarshi, and refers to his opinions on the causes of diseases. Some scholars, such as Hemaraja Sharma, believe that Daruvaha or Daruvahin was another name of Nagnajit, as suggested by Indu.
- A commentary on Ashtanga-hrdaya cites Nagnajit's opinion on food, blood, and flesh.
- A manuscript of Hemadri's Lakshana-prakasha, dated to 1525 VS, cites Vinagnajit as an authority on Ayurveda; according to Shastri, "Vinagnajit" may be a typo for "Nagnajit".

== Historicity ==
J.C. Ghosh (1939) theorizes that the Nagnajit referred to in various texts was a single person. According to Ghosh, he was a Vedic period king who was also an exponent of the Gandhara school of art. Ghosh identifies Nagnajit's instructors Parvata and Narada as the sages associated with the Rigveda hymns 8.12 and 8.13.

Gustav Roth theorizes that Nagnajit was a king of Gandhara, an authority on shilpa shastra (arts and crafts), and possibly a wrestling champion as suggested by his name (Roth interprets the Sanskrit name nagna-jit as "an athlete beating a naked opponent").

Ajay Mitra Shastri (1991) disputes Ghosh's theory on various grounds. For example, different texts name different sons and teachers of Nagnajit. Also, Varahamihira's Brhat Samhita does not describe him as a king, and suggests that Nagnajit was associated with the Dravida (South Indian) school of sculpture, not Gandhara school of art.

According to Shastri, there were at least three distinct kings named Nagnajit (who ruled in Gandhara and/or neighbouring areas), plus a scholar with the same name:

- Nagnajit of Gandhara, a contemporary of Bhima of Vidarbha. He is referred to in the Aitareya Brahmana, Kumbhakara Jataka, and Uttaradhyayana-sutra. Shastri places this king in 7th century BCE or earlier, since two of these texts describe him as a contemporary of Nimi, who according to the Nimi Jataka was the penultimate king of Videha. The Buddhist and Jain texts present Nagnajit as a believer in their respective faiths, and the Brahmanical text Shatapatha Brahmana rejects his opinion. According to historian Shastri, this suggests that Nagnajit did not favour certain Brahmanical practices.
- Nagnajit of Mahabharata.
- Nagnajit of Purusha-pura, mentioned in the Avashyaka-churni.
- Nagnajit, the scholar who wrote on temple architecture, sculpture, and painting. He lived sometime before the 6th century CE (as Varahamihira refers to him), and likely wrote a treatise on Dravidian sculpture.

According to Shastri, the Ayurveda scholar named Nagnajit may be identified with one of the three kings of Gandhara.
