= Subashi Formation =

Geologic formation in China

- Stratigraphic range: Campanian-Maastrichtian; ~83.6–66 Ma
- Type: Geological formation
- Overlies: Unconformity with Kumtax Formation

Lithology
- Primary: Red or variegated sandstone
- Other: Mudstone

Location
- Coordinates: 43.1°N 91.8°E
- Approximate paleocoordinates: 39.6°N 82.8°E
- Region: Xinjiang
- Country: China
- Extent: Turpan Basin

Type section
- Named by: Dong Zhiming
- Year defined: 1977
- Subashi Formation (Bayingolin)

The Subashi Formation (Chinese: 苏巴什组) is a Late Cretaceous (Campanian to Maastrichtian) formation from the Xinjiang Autonomous Region of western China. Initially described by Dong Zhiming in 1977, the formation contains remains of Tarbosaurus which were initially described as a separate taxon Shanshanosaurus huoyanshanensis. Remains of a sauropod, likely Nemegtosaurus, and a hadrosaurid, likely Jaxartosaurus, have also been found.

The formation is located in the Flaming Mountains region of Xinjiang, north of the Turpan Depression. It is not far from Lianmuqin Town of Shanshan County, and is presumably named after the village of Subashi (42°55′11″N 89°44′36″E), which is located some 15 kilometres (9.3 mi) to the west of Lianmuqin, in Tuyugou Township (吐峪沟乡).

== Fossil content ==
The following fossils were reported from the formation:

Color key: Taxon / Reclassified taxon / Taxon falsely reported as present / Dubious taxon or junior synonym / Ichnotaxon / Ootaxon / Morphotaxon	Notes; Uncertain or tentative taxa are in small text; ~~crossed out~~ taxa are discredited.

=== Dinosaurs ===
==== Ornithischians ====
Ornithischians of the Subashi Formation
Genus	Species	Location	Stratigraphic position	Material	Notes	Images
Euoplocephalus	E. tutus	Shanshan County, Xinjiang, China	Campanian to Maastrichtian		A ankylosaurin ankylosaurine	
Jaxartosaurus	J. fuyunensis	Shanshan County, Xinjiang, China	Campanian to Maastrichtian		A lambeosaurine hadrosaurid	

==== Sauropods ====
Sauropods of the Subashi Formation
Genus	Species	Location	Stratigraphic position	Material	Notes	Images
Nemegtosaurus	N. pachi	Shanshan County, Xinjiang, China	Campanian to Maastrichtian	Teeth	A nemegtosaurid titanosaur	
Titanosauridae Indet.	Indeterminate	Shanshan County, Xinjiang, China	Campanian to Maastrichtian		A titanosaurid lithostrotian	

==== Theropods ====
Theropods of the Subashi Formation
Genus	Species	Location	Stratigraphic position	Material	Notes	Images
Coelurosauria Indet.	Indeterminate	Shanshan County, Xinjiang, China	Campanian to Maastrichtian		A coelurosaurian theropod	
Tarbosaurus	T. baatar	Shanshan County, Xinjiang, China	Campanian to Maastrichtian		A giant tyrannosaurin tyrannosaurine	

=== Turtles ===
Turtles of the Subashi Formation
Genus	Species	Location	Stratigraphic position	Material	Notes	Images
Gravemys	G. hutchisoni	Shanshan County, Xinjiang, China	Campanian to Maastrichtian		A lindholmemydid turtle	

=== Oofossils ===
Oofossils of the Subashi Formation
Genus	Species	Location	Stratigraphic position	Material	Notes	Images
Ovaloolithus	O. turpanensis	Shanshan County, Xinjiang, China	Campanian to Maastrichtian		Likely laid by hadrosaurs or other ornithopods	

== See also ==
- Subashi (lost city)
