= Shanshan County =

Shanshan County: 鄯善县 (Chinese); پىچان ناھىيىسى (Uyghur); Piqan, Pichan
- County
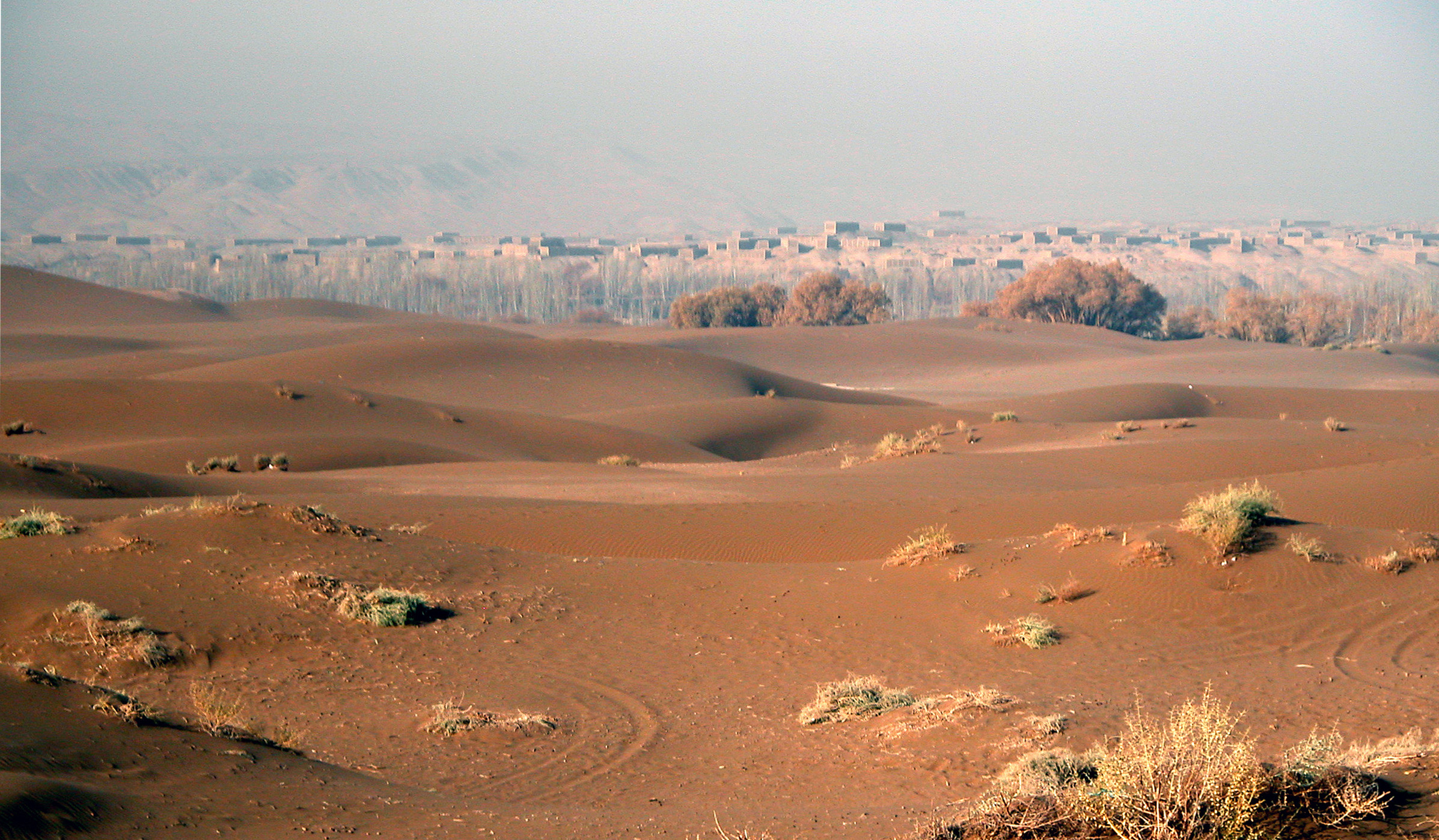
- Sheds for drying grapes in the desert outside Shanshan

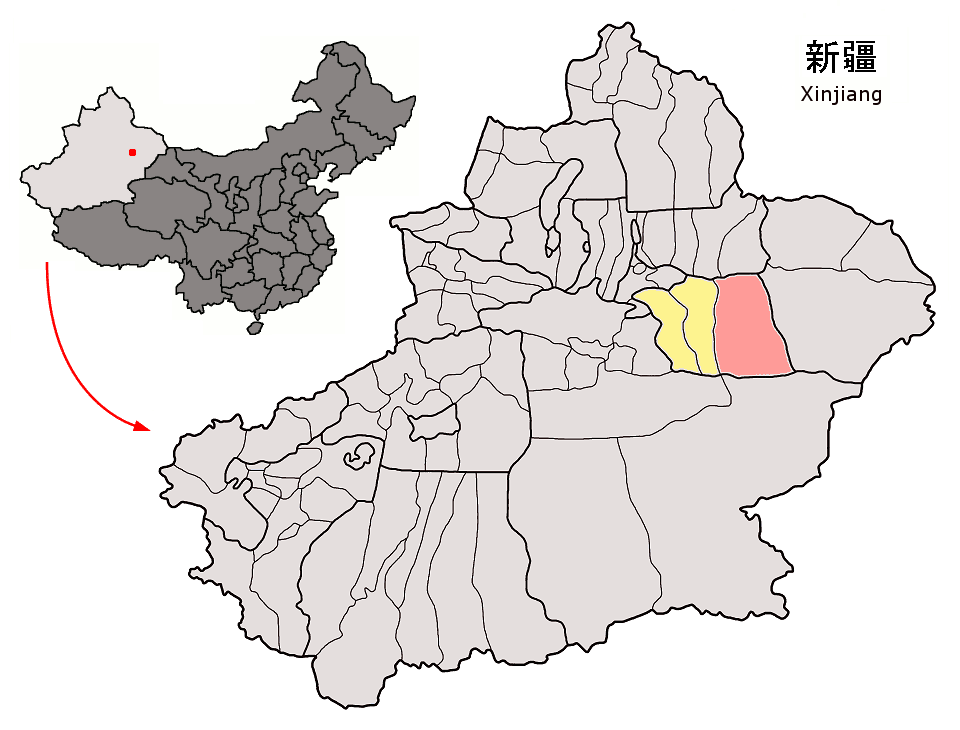

- Location of the seat in Xinjiang Shanshan (China)
- Coordinates: 42°52′08″N 90°12′47″E
- Country: China
- Autonomous region: Xinjiang
- Prefecture-level city: Turpan
- County seat: Shanshan Town

Area
  - Total: 39,550 km^{2} (15,270 sq mi)

Population (2020)
  - Total: 242,310
  - Density: 6.127/km^{2} (15.87/sq mi)
- Time zone: UTC+8 (China Standard (Note: Locals in Xinjiang frequently observe UTC+6 (Xinjiang Time), 2 hours behind Beijing.))
- Website: www.xjss.gov.cn

Shanshan County

Chinese name
- Simplified Chinese: 鄯善县
- Traditional Chinese: 鄯善縣
Transcriptions
Standard Mandarin
- Hanyu Pinyin: Shànshàn Xiàn

Alternative Chinese name
- Simplified Chinese: 皮羌县
- Traditional Chinese: 皮羌縣
Transcriptions
Standard Mandarin
- Hanyu Pinyin: Píqiāng Xiàn

Uyghur name
- Uyghur: پىچان ناھىيىسى
Transcriptions
- Latin Yëziqi: Pichan Nahiyisi
- Yengi Yeziⱪ: Piqan Naⱨiyisi
- SASM/GNC: Piqan Nahiyisi
- Siril Yëziqi: Пичан Наһийиси

Shanshan County (Chinese: 鄯善县) as the official romanized name, also transliterated from Uyghur as Piqan County (Uyghur: پىچان ناھىيىسى; Chinese: 皮羌县), is a county within the Xinjiang Uyghur Autonomous Region and is under the administrative jurisdiction of the prefecture-level city of Turpan. It contains an area of 39,548 km^{2} (15,270 sq mi), occupying the eastern majority of Turpan. According to the 2002 census, it has a population of 210,000.

The county seat is in Shanshan Town.

== Name ==
The county is named after the ancient Shanshan Kingdom, although the kingdom was actually located mostly outside of the borders of the modern county, in the Lop Nur area. The place was originally named Piqian, and the Grand coordinator and provincial governor of Xinjiang proposed the name of Shanshan when Guangxu Emperor decided to set up a county in 1902.

== History ==
The local geology and the desert climate made it possible to discover a number of important fossil sites in the area, including China's largest cluster of fossilized dinosaur tracks and China's largest dinosaur. Important dinosaur sites are associated with the Lianmuqin Formation (named after Lianmuqin Town) and the Subashi Formation (named after Subashi Village (42°55′16″N 89°44′39″E) in Tuyugou Township (吐峪沟乡). The Shanshanosaurus is named after Shanshan.

In 2008–2011, a team of German and Chinese paleontologists discovered and studied an "enormous" accumulation of Jurassic turtle fossils at a site they nicknamed "Mesa Chelonia", approximately 25 km (16 mi) NNE of Shanshan Town. It is estimated that at least 1,800 skeletons of freshwater turtles, preliminary identified as belonging to the Annemys species were buried in this bone bed, in a stratigraphic layer probably belonging to the Qigu Formation. The researchers suggest that during a drought the turtles congregating at one of the few remaining water sources, and died there once that last water hole dried out. Then the skeletons were transported to the present location by a debris flow during a catastrophic rainfall event, forming a Konzentrat-Lagerstätte.

According to the paleontologist Walter Joyce, the Shanshan find has more than doubled the total number of Jurassic turtle specimens known to science. The excavated fossils have been transported to Shanshan Town, where they will be housed in the county museum (currently under construction).

On January 6, 2009, five well-preserved mummies of ethnic Han men who lived during the Qing dynasty were excavated at a construction site near the Flaming Mountains in the county.

In June 2013, an incident in Lukchun lead to the deaths of dozens.

== Subdivisions ==
Shanshan County is divided into 7 towns, 2 townships, 1 ethnic township and 2 other township-level divisions.

Name	Simplified Chinese	Hanyu Pinyin	Uyghur (UEY)	Uyghur Latin (ULY)	Administrative division code
Towns
Shanshan Town	鄯善镇	Shànshàn Zhèn	پىچان شەھەر بازىرى	Pichan sheher baziri	650421100
Chiqtim Town (Qiketai Town)	七克台镇	Qīkètái Zhèn	چىقتىم بازىرى	Chiqtim baziri	650421101
Railway Station Town	火车站镇	Huǒchēzhàn Zhèn	پويىز ئىستانسىسى بازىرى	Poyiz Istansisi baziri	650421102
Lemjin Town (Lianmuqin Town)	连木沁镇	Liánmùqìn Zhèn	لەمجىن بازىرى	Lemjin baziri	650421103
Lükchün Town (Lukeqin Town)	鲁克沁镇	Lǔkèqìn Zhèn	لۈكچۈن بازىرى	Lükchün baziri	650421104
Pichan Town	辟展镇	Pìzhǎn Zhèn	پىچان ئەتراپى بازىرى	Pichan etrapi baziri	650421105
Dighar Town	迪坎镇	Díkǎn Zhèn	دىغار بازىرى	Dighar baziri	650421106
Ethnic township
Dungbazar Hui Ethnic Township	东巴扎回族乡	Dōngbāzhā Huízú Xiāng	دۇڭبازار خۇيزۇ يېزىسى	Dungbazar xuyzu yëzisi	650421201
Townships
Tuyuq Township (Tuyugou Township)	吐峪沟乡	Tǔyùgōu Xiāng	تۇيۇق يېزىسى	Tuyuq yëzisi	650421202
Dalankariz Township (Dalangkan Township)	达朗坎乡	Dálǎngkǎn Xiāng	دالانكارىز يېزىسى	Dalankariz yëzisi	650421203
Township-level divisions
Nanshan Mining District	南山矿区	Nánshān Kuàngqū	نەنسەن كانچىلىق رايونى	Nensen kanchiliq rayoni	650421400
Shanshan Horticultural Ground	园艺场	Yuányìchǎng	باغۋەنچىلىك مەيدانى	Baghwenchilik meydani	650421401

== Geography ==
Biratar Bulak is a spring in the southern part of the county.

== Climate ==
Climate data for Shanshan, elevation 399 m (1,309 ft), (1991–2020 normals, extremes 1991–present)
Month	Jan	Feb	Mar	Apr	May	Jun	Jul	Aug	Sep	Oct	Nov	Dec	Year
Record high °C (°F)	8.0 (46.4)	17.3 (63.1)	29.3 (84.7)	38.5 (101.3)	40.9 (105.6)	45.5 (113.9)	47.0 (116.6)	46.2 (115.2)	41.2 (106.2)	32.9 (91.2)	20.5 (68.9)	9.8 (49.6)	47.0 (116.6)
Mean daily maximum °C (°F)	−2.8 (27.0)	5.8 (42.4)	16.0 (60.8)	25.3 (77.5)	31.4 (88.5)	36.3 (97.3)	38.0 (100.4)	36.7 (98.1)	30.8 (87.4)	21.1 (70.0)	9.4 (48.9)	−0.8 (30.6)	20.6 (69.1)
Daily mean °C (°F)	−9.4 (15.1)	−1.7 (28.9)	8.2 (46.8)	17.3 (63.1)	23.2 (73.8)	28.3 (82.9)	29.7 (85.5)	27.9 (82.2)	21.1 (70.0)	11.5 (52.7)	1.9 (35.4)	−7.0 (19.4)	12.6 (54.7)
Mean daily minimum °C (°F)	−14.4 (6.1)	−7.7 (18.1)	1.2 (34.2)	9.7 (49.5)	15.2 (59.4)	20.5 (68.9)	22.2 (72.0)	20.3 (68.5)	13.8 (56.8)	5.1 (41.2)	−3.3 (26.1)	−11.4 (11.5)	5.9 (42.7)
Record low °C (°F)	−24.7 (−12.5)	−22.2 (−8.0)	−11.9 (10.6)	−2.7 (27.1)	3.4 (38.1)	9.0 (48.2)	12.4 (54.3)	8.8 (47.8)	1.3 (34.3)	−5.6 (21.9)	−13.5 (7.7)	−23.7 (−10.7)	−24.7 (−12.5)
Average precipitation mm (inches)	1.4 (0.06)	0.8 (0.03)	1.2 (0.05)	2.1 (0.08)	2.3 (0.09)	4.7 (0.19)	5.1 (0.20)	3.5 (0.14)	1.9 (0.07)	1.9 (0.07)	0.7 (0.03)	1.1 (0.04)	26.7 (1.05)
Average precipitation days (≥ 0.1 mm)	1.0	0.5	0.5	1.0	1.3	2.3	4.1	2.6	1.4	1.0	0.6	1.1	17.4
Average snowy days	3.5	1.1	0.1	0.1	0	0	0	0	0	0	0.5	2.7	8
Average relative humidity (%)	61	45	29	27	29	33	37	38	41	50	52	59	42
Mean monthly sunshine hours	182.8	208.4	260.0	281.5	321.3	319.8	315.0	316.1	294.3	267.3	199.5	166.9	3,132.9
Percentage possible sunshine	62	69	69	69	70	70	69	75	80	80	70	60	70
Source: China Meteorological Administration all-time record high

== Demographics ==
The proportion of nationalities in Shanshan (Pichan) County
Nationality	Percentage
Uyghurs	75.0%
Han	19.9%
Hui	4.8%
Others	0.3%
Source of the population statistics :

== Transportation ==
Shanshan is served by China National Highway 312, the Lanzhou–Xinjiang Railway and Shanshan Airport.
