= Atharvaveda =

Fourth Veda, ancient scriptures of Hinduism

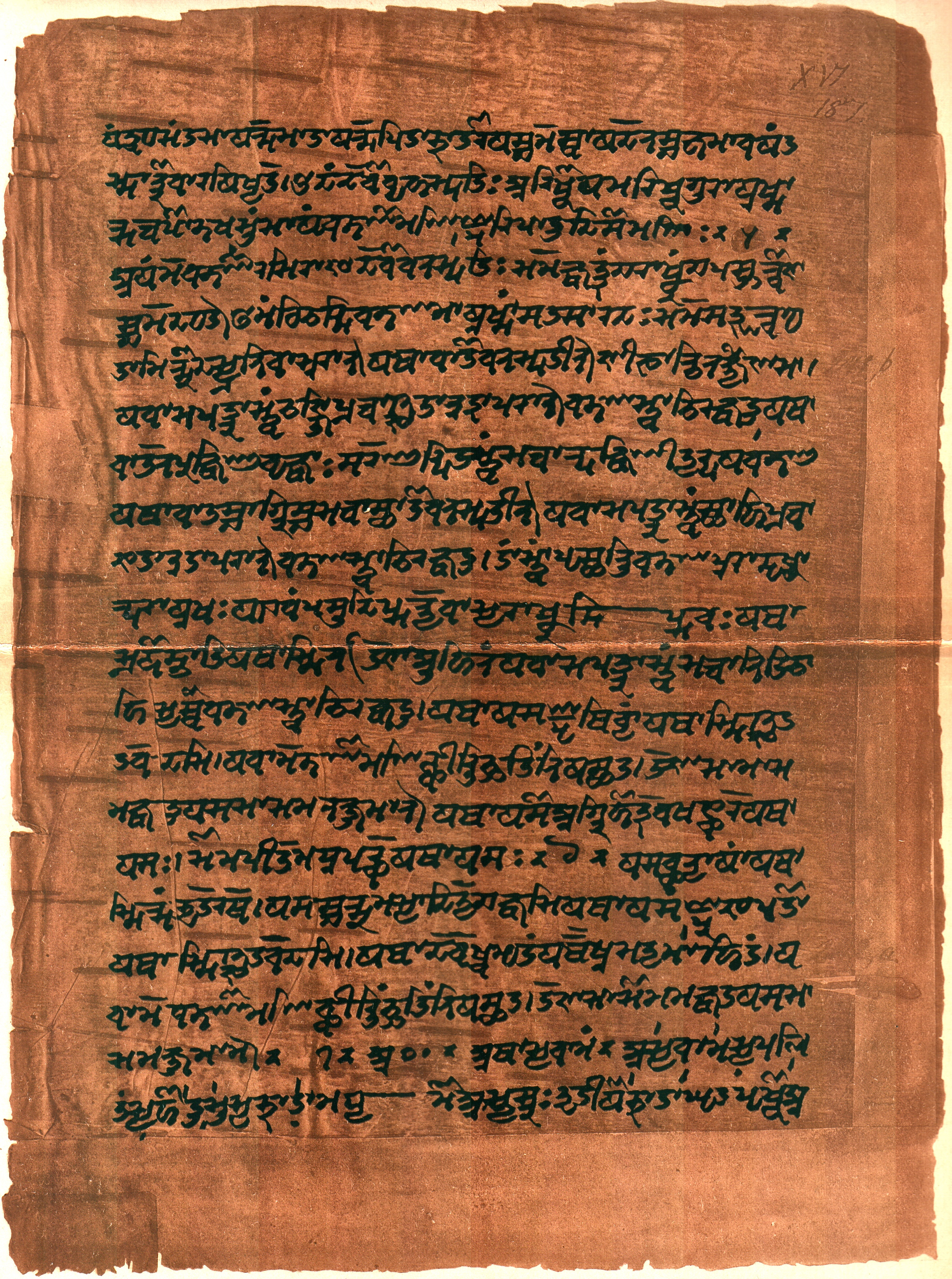
- Atharva-Veda Saṁhitā Manuscript

Information
- Religion: Historical Vedic religion Hinduism
- Language: Vedic Sanskrit
- Period: Vedic period (c. 1200–900 BCE)
- Chapters: 20 kāṇḍas
- Verses: 5,977 mantras

The Atharvaveda or Atharvarna Veda (Sanskrit: अथर्ववेद, IAST: Atharvaveda, from अथर्वन्, "priest" and वेद, "knowledge") is the "knowledge storehouse of atharvans, the procedures for everyday life". The text is the fourth Veda, and is a late addition to the Vedic scriptures of Hinduism.

The language of the Atharvaveda is different from Rigvedic Sanskrit, preserving pre-Vedic Indo-European archaisms. It is a collection of 730 hymns with about 6,000 mantras, divided into 20 books. About a sixth of the Atharvaveda texts adapt verses from the Rigveda, and except for Books 15 and 16, the text is mainly in verse, deploying a diversity of Vedic meters. Two different recensions of the text – the Paippalāda and the Śaunakīya – have survived into modern times. Reliable manuscripts of the Paippalada edition were believed to be lost, but a well-preserved version was discovered among a collection of palm-leaf manuscripts in Odisha in 1957.

The Atharvaveda is sometimes called the "Veda of magical formulas", a description other scholars consider incorrect. In contrast to the 'hieratic religion' of the other three Vedas, the Atharvaveda is said to represent a 'popular religion', incorporating not only formulas for magic, but also the daily rituals for initiation into learning (upanayana), marriage and funerals. Royal rituals and the duties of the court priests are also included in the Atharvaveda.

The Atharvaveda was likely compiled as a Veda contemporaneously with Samaveda and Yajurveda, or about 1200 BCE – 1000 BCE. Along with the Samhita layer of text, the Atharvaveda includes a Brahmana text, and a final layer that covers philosophical speculations. The latter layer of Atharvaveda text includes three primary Upanishads, influential to various schools of Hindu philosophy. These include the Mundaka Upanishad, the Mandukya Upanishad and the Prashna Upanishad.

== Etymology and nomenclature ==
The Veda may be named, states Monier Williams, after the legendary priest named Atharvan who was first to develop prayers to fire, offer Soma, and who composed "formulas and spells intended to counteract diseases and calamities". The name Atharvaveda, states Laurie Patton, is for the text being "Veda of the Atharvāṇas".

The oldest name of the text, according to its own verse 10.7.20, was Atharvangirasah, a compound of "Atharvan" and "Angiras", both Vedic scholars. Each scholar called the text after itself, such as Saunakiya Samhita, meaning the "compiled text of Saunakiya". The "Atharvan" and "Angiras" names, states Maurice Bloomfield, imply different things, with the former considered auspicious while the latter implying hostile sorcery practices. Over time, the positive auspicious side came to be celebrated and the name Atharvaveda became widespread. The latter name Angiras which is linked to Agni and priests in the Vedas, states George Brown, may also be related to Indo-European Angirôs found in an Aramaic text from Nippur.

Michael Witzel states the etymology of Atharvan is Proto-Indo-Iranian *atharwan "[ancient] priest, sorcerer", and it is cognate to Avestan āθrauuan "priest" and possibly related to Tocharian *athr, "superior force". Manfred Mayrhofer also provides a Proto-Indo-Iranian form *atharwan-, claiming that the question of the meaning "remains open."

The Atharvaveda is also occasionally referred to as Bhrgvangirasah and Brahmaveda, after Bhrigu and Brahma, respectively.

== Dating and historical context ==
The Atharvaveda is dated by Flood at ca. 900 BCE, while Michael Witzel gives a dating at, or slightly after, c. 1200/1000 BCE.

The ancient Indian tradition initially recognized only three Vedas. The Rigveda, the verse 3.12.9.1 of Taittiriya Brahmana, the verse 5.32-33 of Aitareya Brahmana and other Vedic era texts mention only three Vedas. The acceptance of the Atharvanas hymns and traditional folk practices was slow, and it was accepted as another Veda much later than the first three, by both orthodox and heterodox traditions of Indian philosophies. The early Buddhist Nikaya texts, for example, do not recognize Atharvaveda as the fourth Veda, and make references to only three Vedas. Olson states that the ultimate acceptance of Atharvaveda as the fourth Veda probably came in the 2nd half of the 1st millennium BCE. However, notes Max Muller, the hymns of Atharvaveda existed by the time Chandogya Upanishad was completed (~700 BCE), but were then referred to as "hymns of Atharvangirasah".

Frits Staal states that the text may be a compilation of poetry and knowledge that developed in two different regions of ancient India, the Kuru region in northern India and the Pancalas region of eastern India. The former was home to Paippalāda, whose name was derived from the sacred fig tree named Pippala (Sanskrit: पिप्पल). This school's compositions were in the Rigvedic style. The Pancalas region contributions came from composer-priests Angirasas and Bhargavas, whose style was unlike the metric Rigvedic composition, and their content included forms of medical sorcery. The Atharvaveda editions now known are a combination of their compositions.

The core text of the Atharvaveda falls within the classical Mantra period of Vedic Sanskrit, during the 2nd millennium BC - later than the Rigveda, and roughly contemporary with the Yajurveda mantras, the Rigvedic Khilani, and the Sāmaveda. There is no absolute dating of any Vedic text including the Atharvaveda. The dating for Atharvaveda is derived from the new metals and items mentioned therein; it, for example, mentions iron (as krsna ayas, literally "black metal"), and such mentions have led Michael Witzel to suggest that the Atharvaveda hymns were compiled in the early Indian Iron Age, at, or slightly after, c. 1200/1000 BCE. corresponding to the early Kuru kingdom.

The priests who practised the Atharvaveda were considered to be the lowest tier of Brahmins, in comparison to the priests who practised the Rigveda, Samaveda, or Yajurveda [considered by whom?]. A stigma held by some against Atharvaveda priests is documented in Odisha well into the modern day.

== Text ==
The Atharvaveda is a collection of 20 books, with a total of 730 hymns of about 6,000 stanzas. The text is, state Patrick Olivelle and other scholars, a historical collection of beliefs and rituals addressing practical issues of daily life of the Vedic society, and it is not a liturgical Yajurveda-style collection.

=== Recensions ===
The Caraṇavyuha, a later era Sanskrit text, states that the Atharvaveda had nine shakhas, or schools: paippalāda, stauda, mauda, śaunakīya, jājala, jalada, brahmavada, devadarśa and cāraṇavaidyā.

Of these, only the Shaunakiya recension, and the more recently discovered manuscripts of Paippalāda recension have survived. The Paippalāda edition is more ancient. The two recensions differ in how they are organized, as well as content. For example, the Book 10 of Paippalada recension is more detailed and observed carefully not doing a single mistake, more developed and more conspicuous in describing monism, the concept of "oneness of Brahman, all life forms and the world".

=== Organization ===
The Atharvaveda Samhita originally was organized into 18 books (Kāṇḍas), and the last two were added later. These books are arranged neither by subject nor by authors (as is the case with the other Vedas), but by the length of the hymns. Each book generally has hymns of about a similar number of verses, and the surviving manuscripts label the book with the shortest hymns as Book 1, and then in an increasing order (a few manuscripts do the opposite). Most of the hymns are poetic and set to different meters, but about a sixth of the book is prose.

Most of the hymns of Atharvaveda are unique to it, except for the one sixth of its hymns that it borrows from the Rigveda, primarily from its 10th mandala. The 19th book was a supplement of a similar nature, likely of new compositions and was added later. The 143 hymns of the 20th book of Atharvaveda Samhita is almost entirely borrowed from the Rigveda.

The hymns of Atharvaveda cover a motley of topics, across its twenty books. Roughly, the first seven books focus primarily on magical poems for all sorts of healing and sorcery, and Michael Witzel states these are reminiscent of Germanic and Hittite sorcery stanzas, and may likely be the oldest section. Books 8 to 12 are speculations of a variety of topics, while Books 13 to 18 tend to be about life cycle rites of passage rituals.

The Srautasutra texts Vaitāna Sūtra and the Kauśika Sūtra are attached to the Atharvaveda Shaunaka edition, as are a supplement of Atharvan Prayascitthas, two Pratishakhyas, and a collection of Parisisthas. For the Paippalada edition of Atharvaveda, corresponding texts were Agastya and Paithinasi Sutras but these are lost or yet to be discovered.

== Contents ==
The Atharvaveda is sometimes called the "Veda of magical formulas", an epithet declared to be incorrect by many scholars. The Samhita layer includes hymns and practices, some of which Kenneth Zysk describes as "magico-religious", including spells to remove maladies believed to be caused by demons and the use of herbs- and nature-derived potions as medicine. Many books of the Atharvaveda Samhita are dedicated to rituals without magic and to theosophy. The text, states Kenneth Zysk, is one of oldest surviving record of the evolutionary practices in religious medicine and reveals the "earliest forms of folk healing of Indo-European antiquity".

The Atharvaveda Samhita contains hymns many of which were charms, magic spells and incantations meant to be pronounced by the person who seeks some benefit, or more often by a sorcerer who would say it on his or her behalf. The most frequent goal of these hymns, charms, and spells were long life of a loved one or recovery from some illness. In these cases, the affected would be given substances such as a plant (leaf, seed, root) and an amulet. Some magic spells were for soldiers going to war with the goal of defeating the enemy, others for anxious lovers seeking to remove rivals or to attract the lover who is less than interested, some for success at a sporting event, in economic activity, for bounty of cattle and crops, or removal of petty pest bothering a household. Some hymns were not about magic spells and charms, but prayer qua prayer and philosophical speculations.

The contents of the Atharvaveda contrasts with the other Vedas. The 19th century Indologist Weber summarized the contrast as follows,

The spirit of the two collections [Rigveda, Atharvaveda] is indeed widely different. In the Rigveda there breathes a lively natural feeling, a warm love for nature; while in the Atharva there prevails, on the contrary, only an anxious dread of her evil spirits and their magical powers. In the Rigveda we find the people in a state of free activity and independence; in the Atharva we see it bound in the fetters of the hierarchy and superstition.

— Albrecht Weber

Jan Gonda cautions that it would be incorrect to label Atharvaveda Samhita as mere compilation of magical formulas, witchcraft and sorcery. While such verses are indeed present in the Samhita layer, a significant portion of the Samhita text are hymns for domestic rituals without magic or spells, and some are theosophical speculations such as "all Vedic gods are One". Additionally, the non-Samhita layers of Atharvaveda text include a Brahmana and several influential Upanishads.

=== Samhita ===
==== Surgical and medical treatment ====
The Atharvaveda includes mantras and verses for treating a variety of ailments. For example, the verses in hymn 4.15 of the recently discovered Paippalada version of the Atharvaveda, discuss how to deal with an open fracture, and how to wrap the wound with Rohini plant (Ficus infectoria, native to India):

Let marrow be put together with marrow, and joint together with joint,
together what of the flesh fallen apart, together sinew and together your bone.
Let marrow come together with marrow, let bone grow over together with bone.
We put together your sinew with sinew, let skin grow with skin.

— Atharvaveda 4.15, Paippalada Edition

==== Charms against fever, jaundice and diseases ====
Numerous hymns of the Atharvaveda are prayers and incantations wishing a child or loved one to get over some sickness and become healthy again, along with comforting the family members. The Vedic era assumption was that diseases are caused by evil spirits, external beings or demonic forces who enter the body of a victim to cause sickness. Hymn 5.21 of the Paippalāda edition of the text, for example, states,

Heaven our father, and Earth our mother, Agni the men-watcher,
let them send the ten days’ fever far away from us.
O fever, these snowy mountains with Soma on their back have made the wind, the messenger, the healer for us,
Disappear from here to the Maratas.
Neither the women desire you, nor the men whosoever,
Neither a small one, nor a grown-up weeps here from desire of fever.
Do not harm our grown-up men, do not harm our grown-up women,
Do not harm our boys, do not harm our girls.
You who simultaneously discharge the balasa, cough, udraja, terrible are your missiles,
O fever, avoid us with them.

— Atharvaveda 5.21, Paippalada Edition, Translated by Alexander Lubotsky

==== Remedy from medicinal herbs ====
Several hymns in the Atharvaveda such as hymn 8.7, just like the Rigveda's hymn 10.97, is a praise of medicinal herbs and plants, suggesting that speculations about the medical and health value of plants and herbs was an emerging field of knowledge in ancient India. The Atharvavedic hymn states (abridged),

The tawny colored, and the pale, the variegated and the red,
the dusky tinted, and the black – all Plants we summon hitherward.
I speak to Healing Herbs spreading, and bushy, to creepers, and to those whose sheath is single,
I call for thee the fibrous, and the reed like, and branching plants, dear to Vishwa Devas, powerful, giving life to men.
The conquering strength, the power and might, which ye, victorious plants possess,
Therewith deliver this man here from this consumption, O ye Plants: so I prepare the remedy.

— Atharvaveda 8.7, Shaunakiya Edition

==== Spells and prayers to gain a lover, spouse ====
The contents of the Atharvaveda have been studied to glean information about the social and cultural mores in the Vedic era of India. A number of verses relate to spells for gaining a husband, or a wife, or the love of a woman, or to prevent any rivals from winning over one's "love interest".

May O Agni!, a suitor after our own heart come to us, may he come to this maiden with fortune!
May she be agreeable to suitors, charming at festivals, promptly obtain happiness through a husband!

As this comfortable cave, O Indra!, furnishing a safe abode hath become pleasing to all life,
thus may this woman be a favourite of fortune, beloved, not at odds with her husband!
Do thou ascend the full, inexhaustible ship of fortune;
upon this bring, hither the suitor who shall be agreeable to thee!

Bring hither by thy shouts, O lord of wealth, the suitor, bend his mind towards her;
turn thou the attention of every agreeable suitor towards her!

— Atharvaveda 2.36

==== Speculations on the nature of man, life, good and evil ====
The Atharvaveda Samhita, as with the other Vedas, includes some hymns such as 4.1, 5.6, 10.7, 13.4, 17.1, 19.53-54, with metaphysical questions on the nature of existence, man, heaven and hell, good and evil. Hymn 10.7 of Atharvaveda, for example, asks questions such as "what is the source of cosmic order? what and where is planted this notion of faith, holy duty, truth? how is earth and sky held? is there space beyond the sky? what are seasons and where do they go? does Skambha (literally "cosmic pillar", synonym for Brahman) penetrate everything or just somethings? does Skambha know the future? is Skambha the basis of Law, Devotion and Belief? who or what is Skambha?"

The wonderful structure of Man

(...) How many gods and which were they,
who gathered the breast, the neck bones of man?
how many disposed the two teats? who the two collar bones?
how many gathered the shoulder bones? how many the ribs?
Who brought together his two arms, saying, "he must perform heroism?"
(...) Which was the god who produced his brain, his forehead, his hindhead?
(...) Whence now in man come mishap, ruin, perdition, misery?
accomplishment, success, non-failure? whence thought?
What one god set sacrifice in man here?
who set in him truth? who untruth?
whence death? whence the immortal?

— Atharvaveda 10.2.4 - 10.2.14, Paippalāda Edition (Abridged)

The Atharvaveda, like other Vedic texts, states William Norman Brown, goes beyond the duality of heaven and hell, and speculates on the idea of Skambha or Brahman as the all pervasive monism. Good and evil, Sat and Asat (truth and untruth) are conceptualized differently in these hymns of Atharvaveda, and the Vedic thought, wherein these are not dualistic explanation of nature of creation, universe or man, rather the text transcends these and the duality therein. Order is established out of chaos, truth is established out of untruth, by a process and universal principles that transcend good and evil.

==== Prayer for peace ====
Some hymns are prayer qua prayer, desiring harmony and peace. For example,

Give us agreement with our own; with strangers give us unity
Do ye, O Asvins, in this place join us in sympathy and love.
May we agree in mind, agree in purpose; let us not fight against the heavenly spirit
Around us rise no din of frequent slaughter, nor Indra's arrow fly, for day is present!

— Atharvaveda 7.52

=== Brahmana ===
The Atharvaveda includes Gopatha Brahmana text, that goes with Atharva Samhita.

=== Upanishads ===
The Atharvaveda has three primary Upanishads embedded within it.

==== Mundaka Upanishad ====
The Mundaka Upanishad, embedded inside the Atharvaveda, is a poetic-style Upanishad with 64 verses, written in the form of mantras. However, these mantras are not used in rituals; rather they are used for teaching and meditation on spiritual knowledge. In ancient and medieval era Indian literature and commentaries, the Mundaka Upanishad is referred to as one of the Mantra Upanishads.

The Mundaka Upanishad contains three Mundakams (parts), each with two sections. The first Mundakam, states Roer, defines the sciences of "Higher Knowledge" and "Lower Knowledge", and then asserts that the acts of oblations and pious gifts are foolish and do nothing to reduce unhappiness in the current life or the next - rather, it is knowledge that frees people. The second Mundakam describes the nature of the Brahman, the Atman (Self, Soul), and the path to know Brahman. The third Mundakam continues the discussion and then asserts that the state of knowing Brahman is one of freedom, fearlessness, liberation and bliss. The Mundaka Upanishad is one of text that discuss the pantheism theory in Hindu scriptures. The text, like other Upanishads, also discusses ethics.

Through continuous pursuit of Satya (truthfulness), Tapas (perseverance, austerity), Samyajñāna (correct knowledge), and Brahmacharya, one attains Atman (Self, Soul).

— Mundaka Upanishad, 3.1.5

==== Mandukya Upanishad ====
The Mandukya Upanishad is the shortest of all the Upanishads, found in the Atharvaveda text. The text discusses the syllable Om, presents the theory of four states of consciousness, and asserts the existence and nature of the Atman (Soul, Self).

The Mandukya Upanishad is notable for inspiring Gaudapada's Karika, a classic of the Vedanta school of Hinduism. The Mandukya Upanishad is among the oft-cited texts on chronology and the philosophical relationship between Hinduism and Buddhism.

==== Prashna Upanishad ====
The Prashna Upanishad is from the Paippalada school of Atharvavedins.

The text contains six Prashna (questions), and each forms a chapter with a discussion of its answers. The first three questions are profound metaphysical questions but, states Eduard Roer, they do not contain any defined philosophical answers; they are mostly embellished mythology and symbolism. The fourth section, in contrast, contains some substantial philosophy. The last two sections discuss the symbol Om and the concept of Moksha.

The Prashna Upanishad is notable for its structure and its sociological insights into the education process in ancient India.

== Manuscripts and translations ==
The Shaunakiya text was published by Rudolf Roth and William Dwight Whitney in 1856, by Shankar Pandurang Pandit in the 1890s, and by Vishva Bandhu in 1960–1962. The first complete English translation was made by Ralph T.H. Griffith in 1895-96, followed shortly by Maurice Bloomfield's translation of about one third of the hymns in 1897. These were followed by a nearly complete translation (missing Book 20) with textual commentary by William Dwight Whitney, published in 1905, which is still cited in contemporary scholarship.

A corrupted and badly damaged version of the Paippalāda text was edited by Leroy Carr Barret from 1905 to 1940 from a single Kashmirian Śāradā manuscript (now in Tübingen). Durgamohan Bhattacharyya discovered palm leaf manuscripts of the Paippalada recension in Odisha in 1957. His son Dipak Bhattacharya has published the manuscripts. Thomas Zehnder translated Book 2 of the Paippalada recension into German in 1999, and Arlo Griffiths, Alexander Lubotsky and Carlos Lopez have separately published English translations of its Books 5 through 15.

The Gopatha Brahmana was translated by Hukam Chand Patyal as a dissertation at Pune University.

== Influence ==
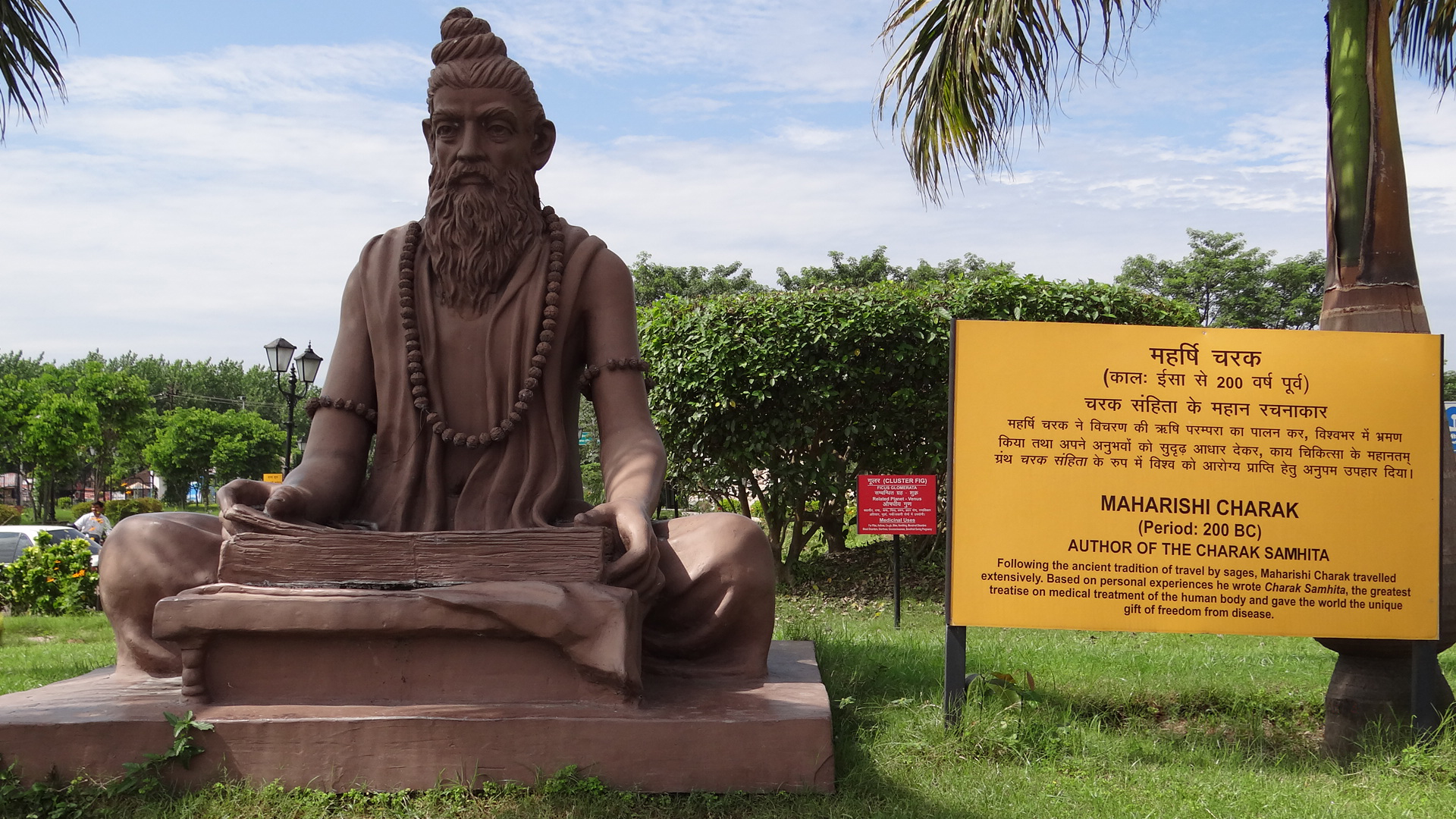
Rishi Caraka (above), the author of Caraka Samhita credits Atharvaveda as an inspiration.

=== Medicine and health care ===
Kenneth Zysk states that the "magico-religious medicine had given way to a medical system based on empirical and rational ideas" in ancient India by around the start of Christian era, still the texts and people of India continued to revere the ancient Vedic texts. Rishi Sushruta, remembered for his contributions to surgical studies, credits Atharvaveda as a foundation. Similarly, the verse 30.21 in the Sutrasthana of the Caraka Samhita, states its reverence for the Atharvaveda as follows,

Therefore, by the physician who has inquired about [which Veda an āyurvedic practitioner should follow, verse 20], devotion to the Atharvaveda is ordered from among the four [Vedas]: Ṛgveda, Sāmaveda, Yajurveda, and Atharvaveda.

— Caraka Samhita, Sutrasthana 30.21

The roots of Ayurveda – a traditional medical and health care practice in India—states Dominik Wujastyk, are in the texts called Caraka Samhita and Sushruta Samhita, both of which say that doctors, when asked, should assert their allegiance and inspiration to be the Vedas, especially Atharvaveda. Khare and Katiyar state that the Indian tradition directly links Ayurveda to Atharvaveda.

Wujastyk clarifies that the Vedic texts are a religious discourse and while herbal health care traditions are found in Atharvaveda, the systematic, scholarly medical literature of ancient India is first found in the Caraka Samhita and Sushruta Samhita. Kenneth Zysk adds Bhela Samhita to this list.

=== Literature ===
The verse 11.7.24 of Atharvaveda contains the oldest known mention of the Indic literary genre the Puranas.

The 1st millennium AD Buddhist literature included books of magico-religious mantras and spells for protection from evil influences of non-human beings such as demons and ghosts. These were called Pirita (Pali: Paritta) and Rakkhamanta ("mantra for protection"), and they share premises and style of hymns found in Atharvaveda.

== See also ==
- Atharvashiras Upanishad
- Ayurveda
- Charaka Samhita
- Sushruta Samhita
- Bhela Samhita
- Upanishads
- Vedas
- Merseburg charms
- Zagovory

== Sources ==
- Flood, Gavin (1996). An Introduction to Hinduism. Cambridge University Press. ISBN 978-0-521-43878-0.
- Witzel, Michael (1997). "The Development of the Vedic Canon and its Schools: The Social and Political Milieu" (PDF). In Witzel, Michael (ed.). Inside the Texts, Beyond the Texts: New Approaches to the Study of the Vedas. Harvard Oriental Series, Opera Minora; vol. 2. Harvard University Press.
- Witzel, Michael (2001). "Autochthonous Aryans? The Evidence from Old Indian and Iranian Texts". Electronic Journal of Vedic Studies. 7 (3): 1–115. doi:10.11588/ejvs.2001.3.830.
