= Shanshan Airport =

Shanshan Airport 鄯善机场
- IATA: SXJ; ICAO: ZWSS

Summary
- Airport type: Public
- Operator: Government
- Serves: Shanshan County
- Elevation AMSL: 449 m / 1,473 ft
- Coordinates: 42°54′42″N 090°14′51″E

Map
- Location of airport in Xinjiang

Runways
Direction	Length		Surface
Direction	m	ft	Surface
08/26	2,500	8,202	Concrete
- Source: IATA, GCM

Shanshan Airport
- Simplified Chinese: 鄯善机场
- Traditional Chinese: 鄯善機場
Transcriptions
Standard Mandarin
- Hanyu Pinyin: Shànshàn Jīchǎng

Shanshan Airport Uyghur: پىچان ئايىرپورت, Пичан Айропорт) (IATA: SXJ, ICAO: ZWSS), also known as Piqan Airport, is an airport serving Shanshan County (also known as Piqan), a city in Uyghur autonomous region of Xinjiang in the People's Republic of China.

== Facilities ==
The airport resides at an elevation of 449 metres (1,473 ft) above mean sea level. It has one runway designated 08/26 with a concrete surface measuring 2,500 by 60 metres (8,202 ft × 197 ft).

== See also ==
- List of airports in the People's Republic of China
