= Bhela Samhita =

Sanskrit medical text

- Author: Bhela
- Original title: भेलसंहिता
- Translator: K.H. Krishnamurthy
- Language: Sanskrit
- Subject: Internal medicine
- Genre: Samhita
- Publication date: c. 7th century CE or later
- Publication place: Ancient India
- Original text: भेलसंहिता at Sanskrit Wikisource

Bhela Samhita (IAST: Bhela-saṃhitā, "Compendium of Bhela") is a Sanskrit-language medical text from ancient India. It is known from an incomplete c. 1650 CE manuscript kept at the Sarasvati Mahal Library in Thanjavur, and a c. 9th century fragment found at Tuyoq. Quotations in other works suggest that an older version of the text, possibly composed during 400–750 CE, existed.

Much of the text is in form of a dialogue between sage Atreya and his pupil Bhela, the author of the text. It shows many similarities with the Charaka Samhita, another text of the Atreya school, but it also shows some similarities with the Sushruta Samhita of the Dhanavantri school.

== Authorship ==
The text is primarily in form of a dialogue between the sage Atreya (Note: The text calls Atreya by several names, including Atreya Punarvasu, Chandra-bhaga, Chandrabhaga Punarvasu, and Krishnatreya.) and his pupil Bhela (also called Bheḍa). However, several other people also talk to Atreya in the text, including:

- the royal sage Nagnajit, who asks Atreya questions about detecting poison in food
- Gurdalu Bhekin, who asks Atreya about medical topography
- Sushrotar Medhavin, who describes the treatment of the dosha-related disorders
- Several sages (including Khandakapya and Maitreya) talk to Atreya on the topic of tastes

In the text, the dialogue between Nagnajit and Atreya takes place during Atreya's visit to Gandhara. Based on the text's mention of Gandhara, some scholars theorize that Bhela was from Gandhara. However, R.S. Singh theorizes that Bhela was from western India, based on an analysis of vegetables used for preparing medicines mentioned in the text.

== Date ==
Multiple sources, including the Thanjavur version of the Bhela Samhita mention Bhela as a pupil of the ancient sage Atreya. Plus, Bhela is mentioned in ancient texts such as the Bower Manuscript. This suggests that Bhela was regarded as a medical authority in the ancient period.

Modern scholars date the Thanjavur manuscript to c. 1650, and the Bhela Samhita version represented by this manuscript was probably completed in the 7th century CE or later, as suggested by internal evidences. Unlike the Charaka Samhita and the Sushruta Samhita, it has not been revised by later authors.

Tisata's Chikitsa-kalika (10th century) contains a recipe attributed to Bhela; this recipe is very similar to the recipe described in the Thanjavur manuscript, although the wording is somewhat different. This suggest that the Bhela Samhita text represented by the Thanjavur manuscript was not very different from the one known to Tisata in the 10th century. The Thanjavur version contains several quotes attributed to Bhela in Jvara-samuchchaya, whose oldest manuscript dates to 924 CE.

Sodhala's Gada-nigraha (c. 1200 CE) describes the formula for a medicine called dhanvantara-ghrta, attributing it to Bhela; the Thanjavur manuscript refers to this medicine twice, but does not provide the actual formula. This suggests that a more complete version of Bhela Samhita existed around 1200 CE.

An earlier form of the text probably developed sometime during 400–750 CE. The Bhela Samhita refers to several practices that originated in the Gupta period, such as chanda-karman and the worship of Shiva on a cremation ground. The original Bhela Samhita was not identical with the Thanjavur text, as suggested by several quotations. For example, on the topic of applying enema to children, the Kaashyapa-samhita (possibly c. 7th century) attributes an opinion to Bhela which disagrees with the Thanjavur text.

Bhela's text is probably not much earlier than the Sushruta Samhita. While the Charaka Samhita refers to the Bhela Samhita, the Thanjavur version was probably composed after Dṛḍhabala redacted the present-day version of Charaka Samhita.

The Bower Manuscript attributes three gruels to Bhela. Eleven more prescriptions mentioned in the Bower Manuscript also appear in the Thanjavur manuscript of Bhela Samhita, although not attributed to Bhela; these may have derived from earlier works that are now lost.

== Contents ==
Bhela Samhita is a medical treatise that primarily deals with internal medicine (kaya-chikitsa). The text mainly consists of shloka verses in anuṣṭubh metre, and only the Sharira-sthana part contains prose passages.

The Sutra-sthana section of the text lists its contents as follows:

Section (sthana)	Number of chapters	Chapters surviving (partial or complete) in the Thanjavur manuscript
Sutra-sthana	30	4–23, 25–28
Nidana-sthana	8	2–8
Vimana-sthana	8	1, 3–6
Sharira-sthana	8	2–8
Indriya-sthana	12	1–12
Chikitsa-sthana	30	1–28
Kalpa-sthana	12	1, 3–9
Siddhi-sthana	12	1–2, 4–8

Some features of the text include:

- It names four categories of living beings: placentals, oviparous, germinating, and moisture-born (svedaja).
- It states that the main task of a physician (kaya-chikitsaka) is to treat the disorders of the "digestive fire" (kaya-agni), which is located in the abdomen, and whose size depends on the body size of the animal
- Its list of internal and external organs differs slightly from the Charaka Samhita, and it names the rasa (nutritive fluid) as the most important constituent of the body. Its description of the heart is similar to that of the Sushruta Samhita, and it states that according to Parashara, the heart is the first part of the embryo to develop. It also discusses other concepts in physiology, such as 8 types of sweat.
- It contains general advice regarding diet. For example, it describes 12 types of wholesome food articles; advises people against drinking water before or during a meal; and advises against eating a fish called chilichima in combination with milk.
- It states that the mental state of the parents during the sexual intercourse determines the nature (guṇa - satvika, rajasa, or tamasa) of a child.
- It discusses a wide range of disorders. Examples include various types of diarrhea (including the ones caused by fear and grief), fainting and sleep-related disorders, including hypersomnia and insomnia etc.
- It discusses a wide range of causes of the disorders, such as abnormalities during pregnancy; constipation; bile; improper administration of emetics and laxatives, five causes of baldness and grey hair etc.
- It describes 20 kind of parasites (krmi). It describes rainy season as dangerous, stating that there is a high incidence of disease during it.
- It rejects the claim that supernatural beings cause epilepsy, and instead states that an epilepsy attack is caused when one or more doshas obstruct the veins leading from the heart to the mind.
- It rejects the claim that supernatural beings cause insanity, instead attributing it to a gradual process in which the doshas progressively affect the various parts of the mind, including the manas, the chitta and the buddhi. It also discusses other mental disorders that may develop into instanity.
- It describes many drug formulae and therapeutic rules. It also mentions religious elements while describing treatment of fevers, such as invoking of deities like Vishnu and Shiva, and chanting of Vedic mantras. It also discusses fevers in animals other than humans.
- It mentions spirit possession (bhutonmada) while discussing insanity, but does not give much attention to the topic. It states that the physicians should focus on prescribing drugs, and the religious treatment should be left to exorcists (bhuta-vaidya or bhuta-chikitsaka).
- It lists 16 deities that preside over the functions of the body and the mind: Agni, Prithvi, Apah, Akasha, Vayu, Vidyut, Parjanya, Indra, Gandharva, Mrtyu, Aditya, Chandramas, Tvastar, Vishnu, Prajapati, and Brahma. This list does not match with a similar list in the Charaka Samhita.
- It discusses the transmigration of the soul.

=== Comparison with the Charaka Samhita ===
The Charaka Samhita refers to Bhela Samhita, and the two texts are similar in many ways:

- They agree on several topics, suggesting that they both belong to the Atreya school.
- The name of the sections (sthanas) and the number of chapters in each section is exactly same.
- Several chapters in the two texts have same or similar names.
- The chapters in both texts begin in same way.
- Both texts (as well as the Sushruta Samhita) feature discussions among sages. For example:
  - Both texts feature a discussion between sages on the topic of tastes, which takes place in the Chaitra-ratha forest. In both cases, Atreya rejects seven different opinions and expresses what he calls the correct view. Unlike the Bhela-sahita, the Charaka Samhita attributes these seven opinions to particular persons.
  - Both texts feature a discussion on which part of the embryo develops first: the views expressed in the Bhela-sahita and the Charaka Samhita are very similar, and disagree with the view of the Sushruta Samhita.

However, the Bhela Samhita also differs from the Charaka Samhita in several ways:

- It is more concise and uses simpler language than the Charaka Samhita.
- Its chapters end differently, with the phrase ity āha bhagavān Ātreyaḥ.
- While some of the content in the two texts is similar, there are substantial differences. For example, the Vimana-sthana sections of the two texts differs considerably.
- It contains considerable similarities with the Dhanavantri school represented by the Sushruta Samhita.

== Manuscripts ==
Only one pre-modern manuscript of Bhela Samhita with substantial content is known. It is kept at the Sarasvati Mahal Library in Thanjavur, and several copies of this manuscripts have been made, such as the one at the India Office Library. The Thanjavur manuscript is missing several chapters or portions of chapters, and the surviving chapters are not arranged in the proper order. It has several scribal errors, and the Sanskrit text is often grammatically incorrect. Several other copies of this manuscript have been prepared.

A fragment of Bhela Samhita survives as one page from a paper manuscript found at Tuyoq, dated to c. 9th century. It was discovered by Indologist Heinrich Lüders among a collection of manuscripts brought to Europe by archaeologist Albert von Le Coq. It contains parts of the Nidana-sthana Chapter 1 and the Vimana-sthana chapter 1.

The surviving text known from the Thanjavur manuscript appears to be different from the original text that must have once existed. This can be inferred from the fact that later authors often quote Bhela, but only a few of these quotations are present (some partially) in the Thanjavur manuscript text.

According to Lüders the Tuyoq fragment represents a more original version of the text. The Nidana-sthana section of both the Bhela Samhita and the Charaka Samhita discuss eight major diseases, seven of which are same. The Thanjavur manuscript of Bhela Samhita discusses the kāsa disease instead of the rakta-pitta disease discussed in the Charaka Samhita. However, the Tuyoq fragment discusses rakta-pitta instead of kāsa.

== Critical editions ==
Several editions of the text have been published, all based on the Thanjavur manuscript:

- Edited by Mahamahopadhyaya Ananta-krishna Shastri and Asutosh Mookerjee; published by the University of Calcutta (1921). Shastri was a scholar of Sanskrit, but not of Ayurveda. He corrected some grammatical mistakes in the original text, but omitted some portions of the manuscript.
- Edited by Vaidya Girija-dayal Shukla; published by the Chowkhamba Sanskrit Series Office, Varanasi (1959). This edition was apparently based on the Calcutta edition, and not the original manuscript.
- Edited by Vaidya Visharada V.S. Venkata-subramanya Sastry and Vaidya Visharada C. Rajarajeswara Sarma; published by the Literary Research Unit of the Sarasvati Mahal Library / Central Council for Research in Indian Medicine & Homoeopathy (1977). This critical edition is based on a fresh study of the manuscript, and corrects several mistakes in the earlier editions.
- Edited by Priyavrat Sharma with English translation and commentary by K.H. Krishnamurthy published by Chaukhambha Visvabharati (2000)

== Legacy ==
A number of historical Indian texts on medicine quote from or refer to the Bhela Samhita, including the text of the Bower Manuscript and the Charaka Samhita. Bhela Samhita is one of the sources for the Persian-language text Ma'din al-Shifa (1512), and Ibn Sina may have also been aware of it. The Tibetan tradition refers to Bhela as a medical authority by the name Gzins-can.
