= Tuyoq valley =

Coordinates: 42°50′42″N 89°40′58″E

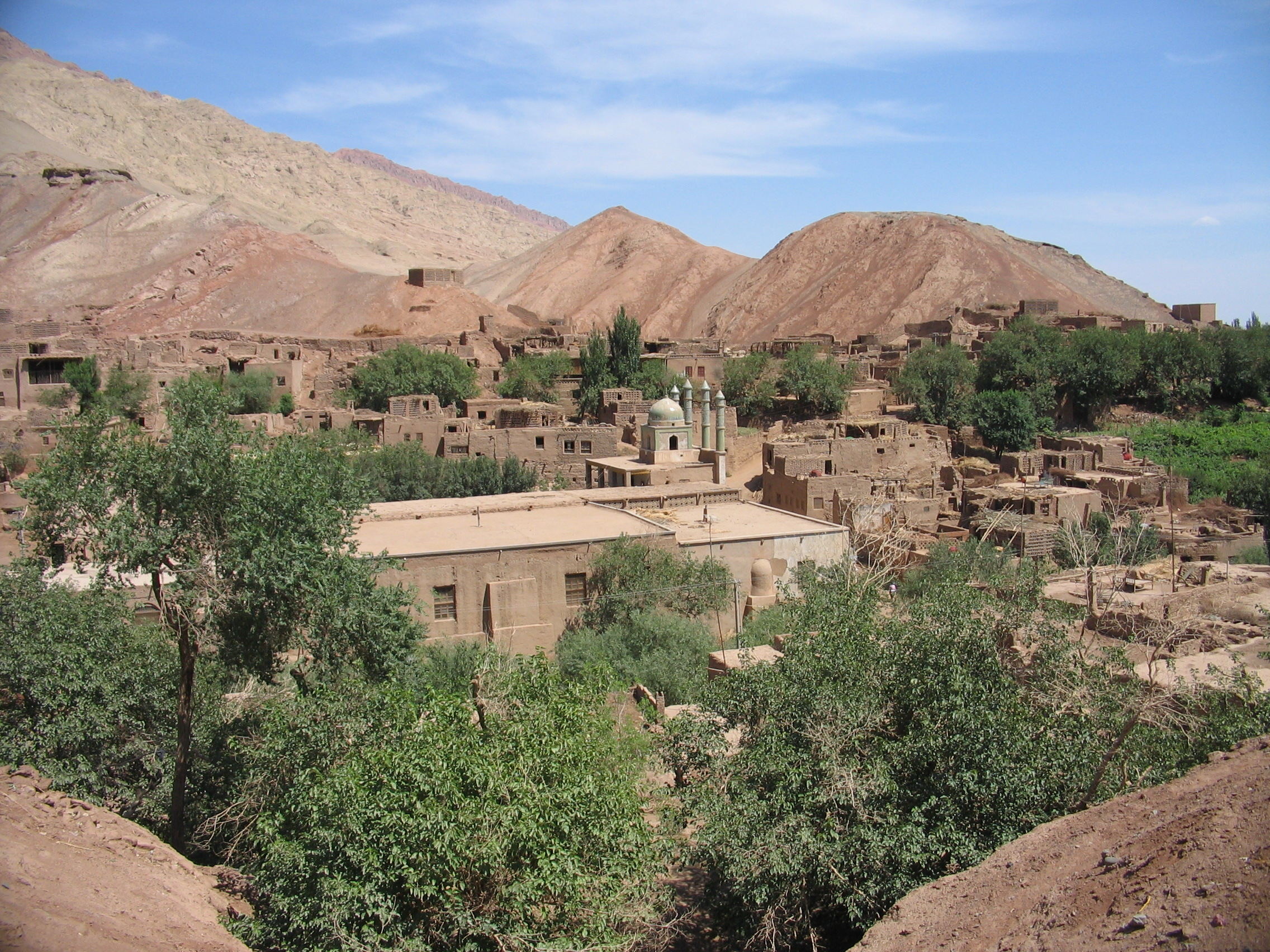
Tuyoq village, Xinjiang, China.

Tuyoq or Tuyugou or Tuyuk (Chinese: 吐峪沟; pinyin: Tǔyùgōu; Uyghur: تۇيۇق) is an ancient oasis-village in the Taklamakan Desert, 70 km east of Turpan in Shanshan County in a lush valley cutting into the Flaming Mountains, with a well preserved old Uyghur style village, and few tourists. It is famous for its seedless grapes and a number of ancient Buddhist grottoes meditation caves nearby containing Buddhist murals and frescos.

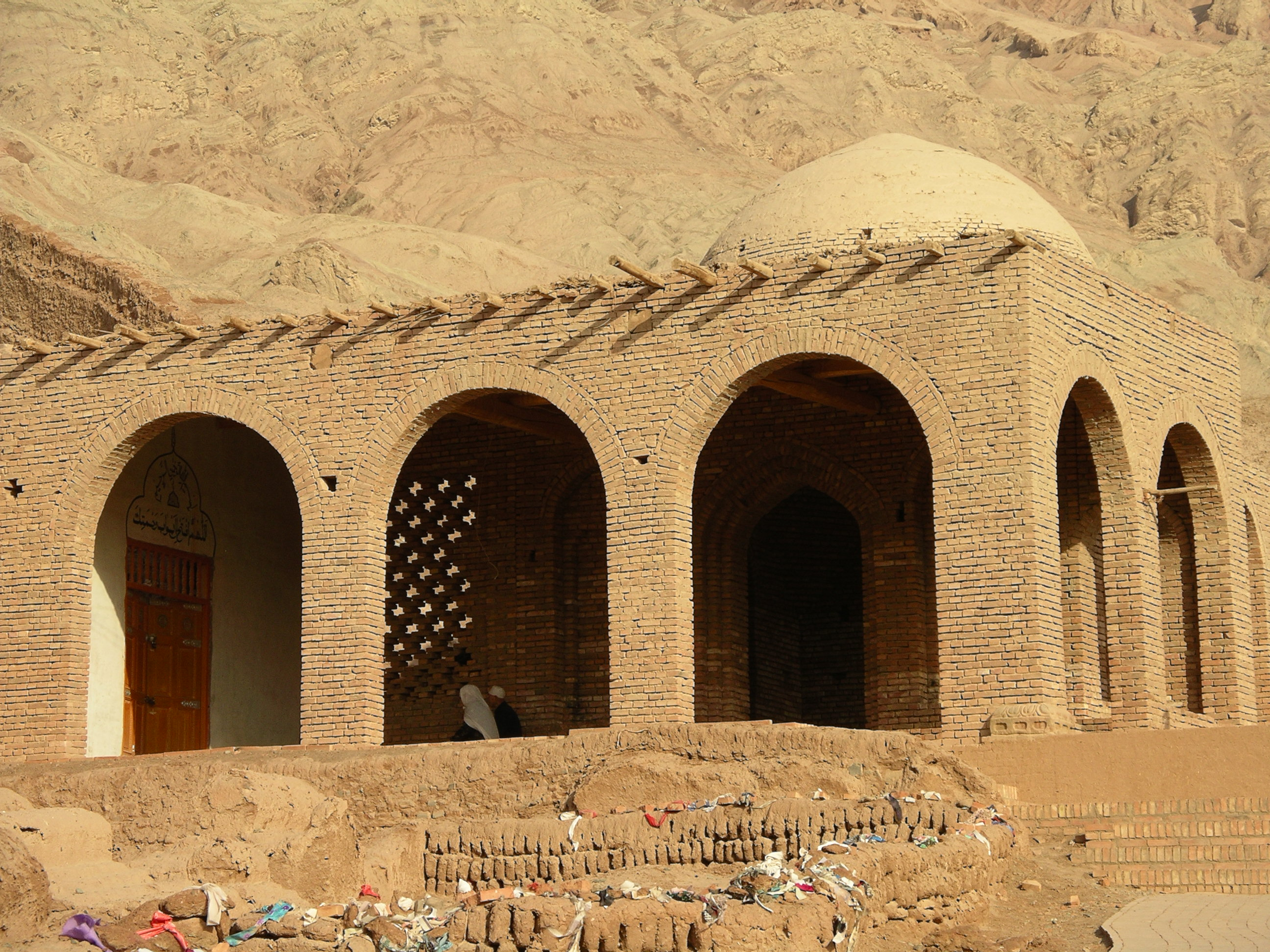
Mosque in Tuyoq

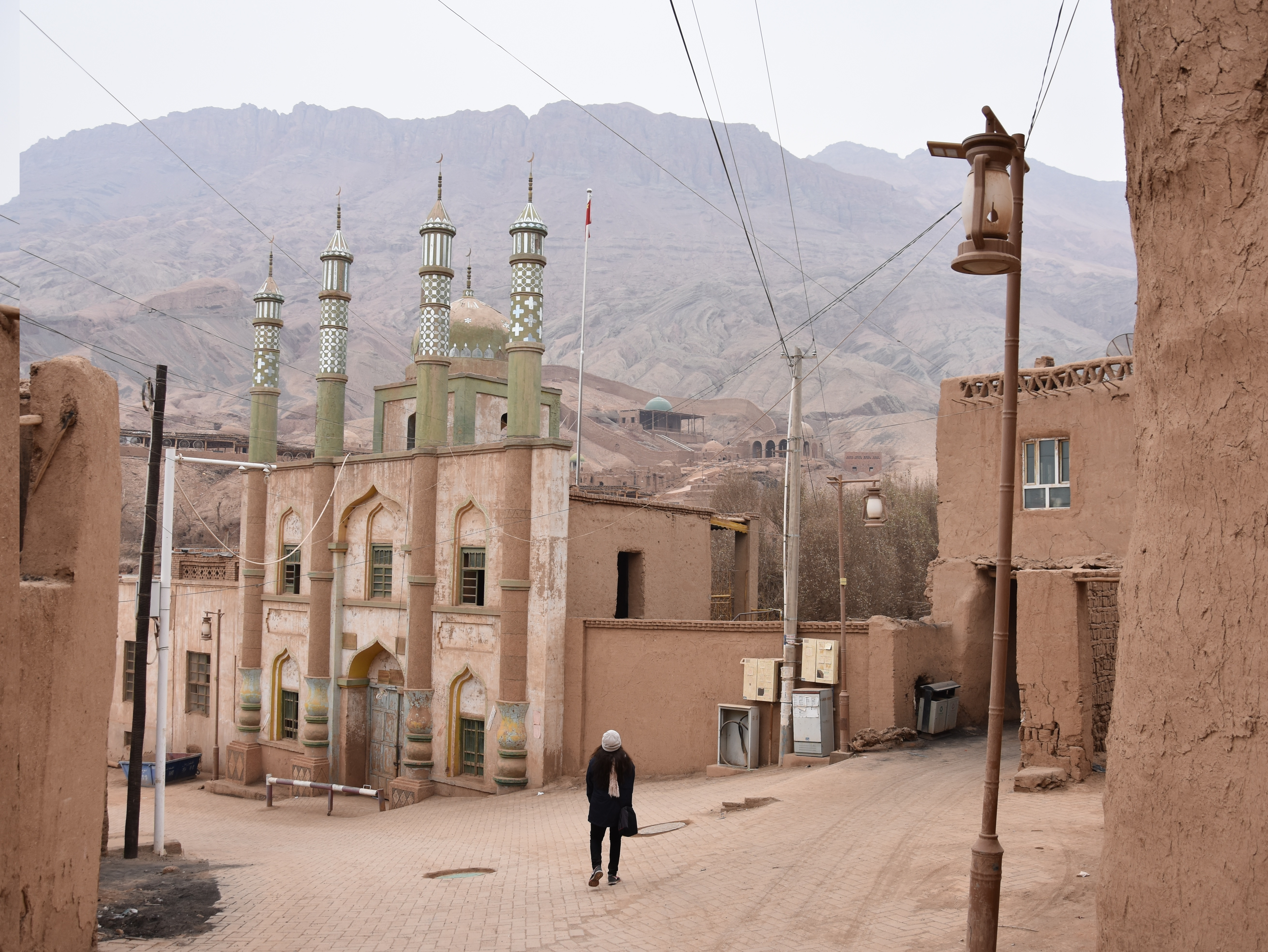
The main mosque of Tuyoq village
