= Kashyapa Samhita =

Treatise on Ayurveda attributed to Kashyapa

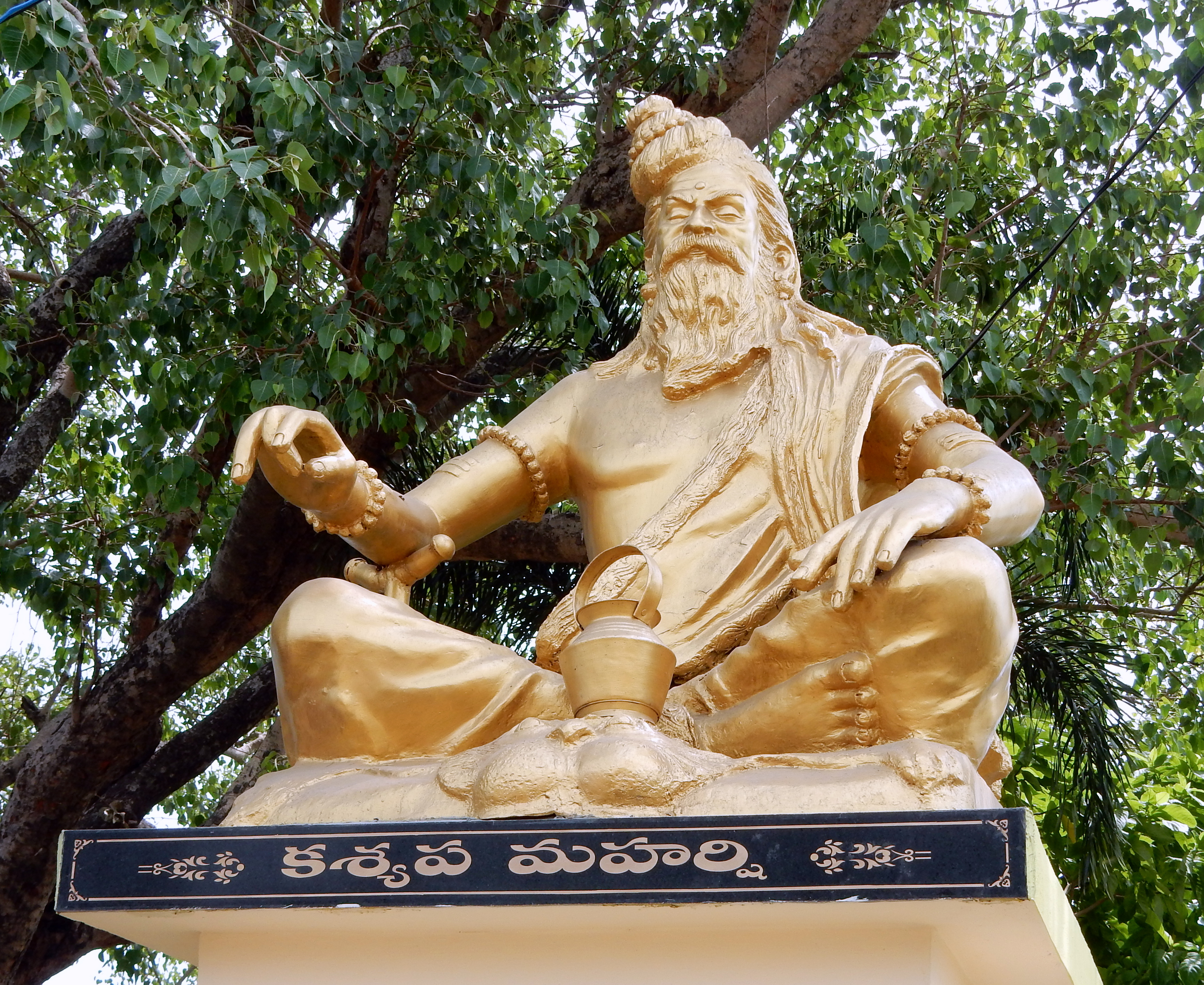
Sage Kashyapa

Kashyap Samhitā (Devanagari कश्यप संहिता, also Kashyapa, Kasyap, Kasyapa), also known as Vriddha Jivakiya Tantra, is a treatise on Ayurveda attributed to the sage Kashyapa.

The text is often named as one of the earliest treatises on Indian medicine, alongside works like the Sushruta Samhita, Charaka Samhita, Bhela Samhita, and Harita Samhita. It is dependent upon the works of the Ayuvedic practitioner Charaka.

In contemporary practice of Ayurveda, it is often consulted in the fields of Ayuvedic pediatrics, gynecology and obstetrics. It is also part of the Ayurveda teaching syllabus, especially in Kaumarabhritya Balaroga. The treatise was translated into Chinese during the Middle Ages.

The Kashyap Samhita contains 200 chapters.

- Sutra sthan, of 30 chapters
- Nidan sthan, of 8 chapters
- Vimana sthan, of 8 chapters
- Shareer sthan, of 8 chapters
- Indriya sthan, of 12 chapters,
- Chikitsa sthan, of 30 chapters,
- Siddhi sthan, of 12 chapters
- Kalpa sthan, of 12 chapters
- Khil Bhag, of 80 chapters.

== Bibliography ==
- Kashyap-Samhita or Vriddha-JivakiyaTantra 1970. Trans IGM Shastri, Bombay Sastu Sahitya, 757.
- Kashyap Samhita or Vridhajivakiya Tantra; text with English translation and commentary; edited by Prof. (km.) P. V. Tewari with Dr. Neeraj Kumar, Dr. R. D. Sharma and Dr. Abhimanyu Kumar
- Kashyap Samhita, Hindi translation with commentary edited by Nepal Raj Guru Pandita Hemaraja Sharma commentary by Shri Satyapal Bhishagacharya.
