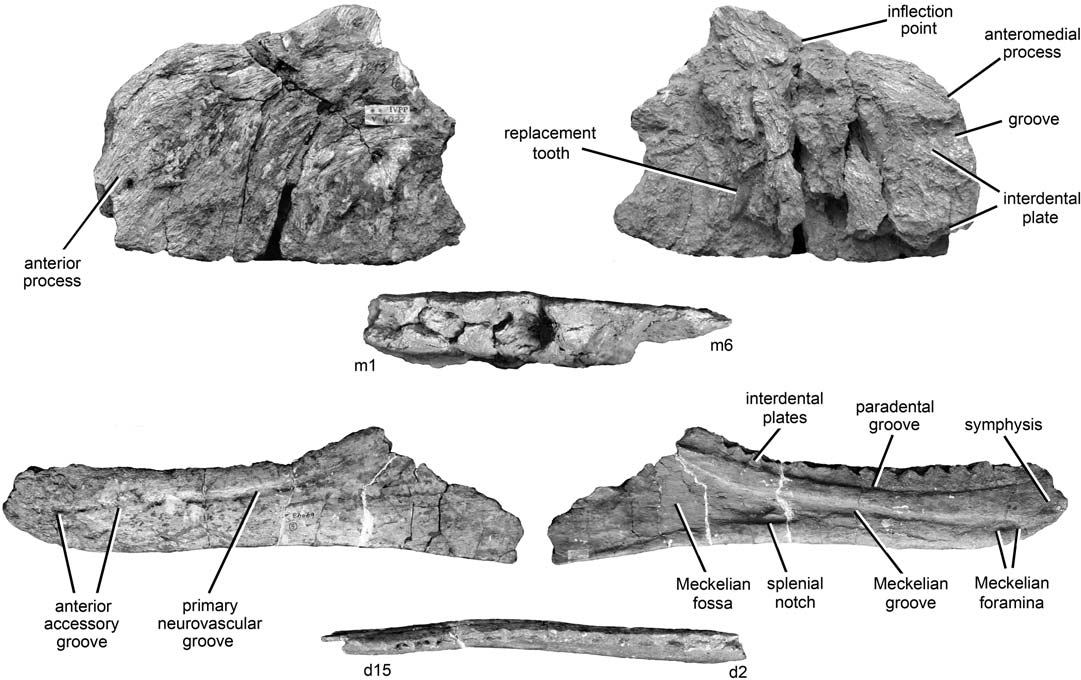
- Maxilla and dentary of IVPP V 4022, the holotype of K. petrolicus

Scientific classification
- Kingdom: Animalia
- Phylum: Chordata
- Class: Reptilia
- Clade: Dinosauria
- Clade: Saurischia
- Clade: Theropoda
- Family: †Carcharodontosauridae (?)
- Genus: †Kelmayisaurus; Dong, 1973

Type species
- †Kelmayisaurus petrolicus Dong, 1973

= Kelmayisaurus =

Kelmayisaurus Temporal range: Valanginian-Albian ~140–100.5 Ma

Extinct genus of dinosaurs

Kelmayisaurus (meaning "Karamay lizard") is an extinct genus of carcharodontosaurian theropod dinosaur from the Early Cretaceous. It was roughly 10–12 meters (33–39 feet) long and its name refers to the petroleum-producing city of Karamay in the Xinjiang province of western China near where it was found.

== Discovery and species ==
Kelmayisaurus is known from the holotype and only specimen IVPP V 4022. It consists of a complete left dentary with teeth and partial left maxilla. The specimen was found during the early 1970s in the Lianmuqin Formation of the Tugulu Group, dating to the Valanginian-Albian stages between 140 and 100 million years ago. The discovery locality is near Wuerho in the Junggar Basin. It was first named and described by Chinese paleontologist Dong Zhiming in 1973 and the type species is Kelmayisaurus petrolicus.

A supposed second species, K. "gigantus", was mentioned in a popular book as being a 21-meter (69-foot) long vertebral column from the Middle Jurassic Shishugou Formation. It is a nomen nudum and does not pertain to Kelmayisaurus, but instead appears to be a lapsus calami for the sauropod Klamelisaurus.

== Classification ==
Kelmayisaurus had been thought to be a nomen dubium due to its scanty remains, and its phylogenetic position was uncertain. It was usually regarded as a basal tetanuran of uncertain affinities. However, Kelmayisaurus is diagnosable by the form and presence of a deeply inset accessory groove on the lateral side of the dentary, the main toothbearing bone of the lower jaw. Some of its features are like those of carcharodontosaurians, but they are also seen in large megalosauroids like Megalosaurus and Torvosaurus.

In 2011, a redescription of the holotype by Stephen L. Brusatte, Roger B.J. Benson and Xing Xu found Kelmayisaurus to be valid genus of Carcharodontosauridae with a single autapomorphy. A phylogenetic analysis of Tetanurae recovered K. petrolicus as a basal carcharodontosaurid in a trichotomy with Eocarcharia and a clade comprising more derived carcharodontosaurids.
