= Lianmuqin Formation =

Geological formation in Xinjiang, China

- Stratigraphic range: Valanginian–Albian
- Type: Geological formation
- Unit of: Tugulu Group
- Underlies: Donggou & Kumutake Formations
- Overlies: Shengjinkou Formation
- Thickness: 213–360 m (699–1,181 ft)

Lithology
- Primary: Mudstone, siltstone

Location
- Coordinates: 46.0°N 85.8°E
- Approximate paleocoordinates: 45.0°N 81.9°E
- Region: Xinjiang
- Country: China
- Extent: Junggar Basin

Type section
- Named for: Lianmuqin
- Lianmuqin Formation (China) Lianmuqin Formation (Xinjiang)

The Lianmuqin Formation, also transcribed as Lianmugin Formation, and Lianmuxin Formation, is an Early Cretaceous geologic formation composed of "interbedded red green and yellow variegated mudstones and siltstones". Dinosaur remains have been recovered from it.

The formation is named after Lianmuqin Town in Shanshan County, Xinjiang.

== Vertebrate paleofauna ==
Color key: Taxon / Reclassified taxon / Taxon falsely reported as present / Dubious taxon or junior synonym / Ichnotaxon / Ootaxon / Morphotaxon	Notes; Uncertain or tentative taxa are in small text; ~~crossed out~~ taxa are discredited.

=== Dinosaurs ===
Dinosaurs of the Lianmuqin Formation
Genus	Species	Location	Stratigraphic position	Material	Notes	Images
Asiatosaurus	A. mongoliensis	NW Junggar Basin				
Kelmayisaurus	K. petrolicus			"Maxilla and dentary."		
Xinjiangovenator	X. parvus			"Tibia [and] phalanges."	Formerly thought to be a representative of Phaedrolosaurus ilikensis.	Holotype bones alongside Phaedrolosaurus lectotype tooth
Phaedrolosaurus	P. ilikensis	NW Junggar Basin		"tooth"		
Psittacosaurus	P. xinjiangensis	NW Junggar Basin				
Tugulusaurus	T. faciles	NW Junggar Basin		"Hindlimb, rib, [and a] vertebral centrum."		
Wuerhosaurus	W. homheni	NW Junggar Basin		"Partial skeleton."		
Tetenura indet.		NW Junggar Basin		"Isolated tooth"		

=== Pterosaurs ===
Pterosaurs of the Lianmuqin Formation
Genus	Species	Location	Stratigraphic position	Abundance	Notes	Images
Dsungaripteridae indet.	indeterminate	Southern Junggar Basin			Not referable to Lonchognathosaurus or Dsungaripterus; likely a new taxon.	
Dsungaripterus	D. weii	NW Junggar Basin				Dsungaripterus and Noripterus
Noripterus	N. complicidens	NW Junggar Basin				Dsungaripterus and Noripterus
Lonchognathosaurus	L. acutirostris	Southern Junggar Basin			Possible junior synonym of Dsungaripterus weii.	
Ornithocheiromorpha Indet.	Indeterminate					

=== Plesiosaurs ===
Name	Species	Location	Stratigraphic position	Abundance	Notes	Images
Sinopliosaurus	S. weiyuanensis	NW Junggar Basin		Three vertebrae and a tooth.	Dubious genus of plesiosaur.	

=== Crurotarsans ===
Name	Species	Location	Stratigraphic position	Abundance	Notes	Images
Edentosuchus	E. tienshanensis	NW Junggar Basin				

=== Turtles ===
Name	Species	Location	Stratigraphic position	Abundance	Notes	Images
Dracochelys	D. bicuspis	Southern Junggar Basin				
Ordosemys	O. brinkmania	NW Junggar Basin				
Wuguia	W. efremovi	Southern Junggar Basin				
Xinjiangchelys	X. sp.	NW Junggar Basin				

Color key: Taxon / Reclassified taxon / Taxon falsely reported as present / Dubious taxon or junior synonym / Ichnotaxon / Ootaxon / Morphotaxon	Notes; Uncertain or tentative taxa are in small text; ~~crossed out~~ taxa are discredited.

== See also ==
- List of dinosaur-bearing rock formations
  - List of stratigraphic units with few dinosaur genera
