= Flaming Mountains =

Mountain range in Xinjiang, China

Coordinates: 42°53′N 89°38′E

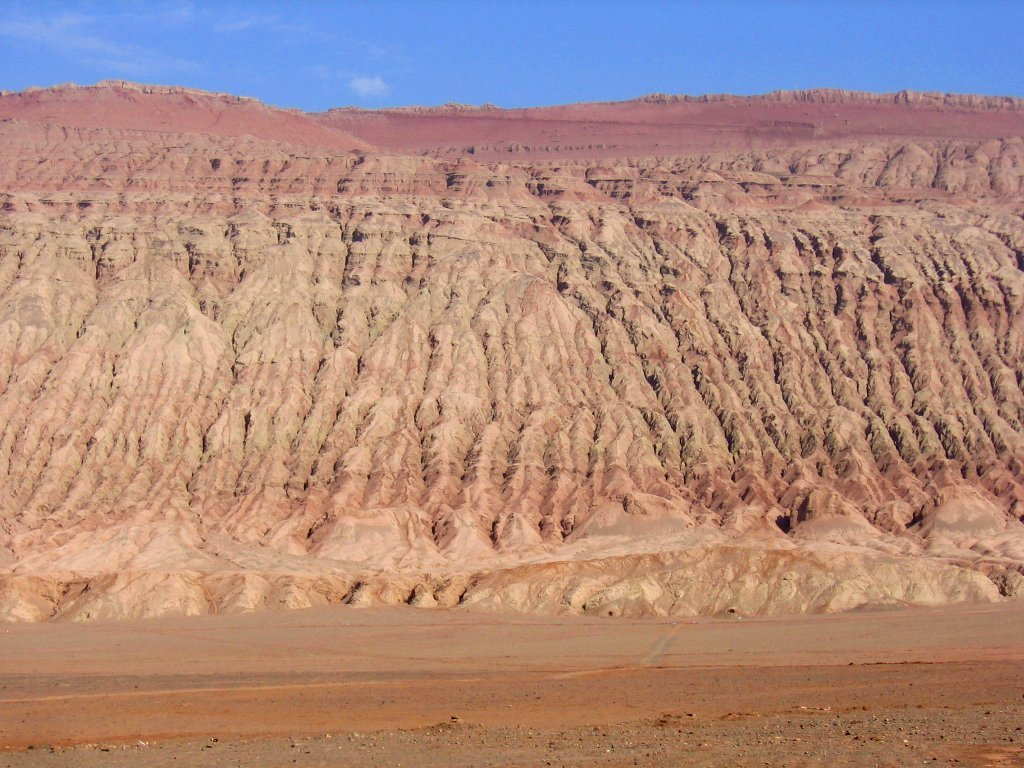
The Flaming Mountains

The Flaming Mountains (Chinese: 火焰山; pinyin: huǒyànshān) or Huoyan Mountains, are barren, eroded, red sandstone hills in the Tian Shan of Xinjiang. They lie near the northern rim of the Taklamakan Desert and east of the city of Turpan. Their striking gullies and trenches caused by erosion of the red sandstone bedrock give the mountains a flaming appearance at certain times of the day.

The mountains are approximately 100 kilometres (60 mi) long and 5–10 km (3–6 mi) wide, crossing the Turpan Depression from east to west. The average height of the Flaming Mountains is 500 m (1,600 ft), with some peaks reaching over 800 m (2,600 ft). The mountain climate is harsh, with summer temperatures often rising extremely high. One of the largest thermometers in China is on display adjacent to the mountain, tracking the surrounding ground temperatures. It is a popular tourist spot.

A number of important palaeontological remains have been found in the area, see e.g. Lianmuqin Formation and Subashi Formation.

Flaming Mountain - route to Bezeklik Thousband Buddha Caves

Flaming Mountains Grand Canyon panorama. October 2026

== Silk route ==
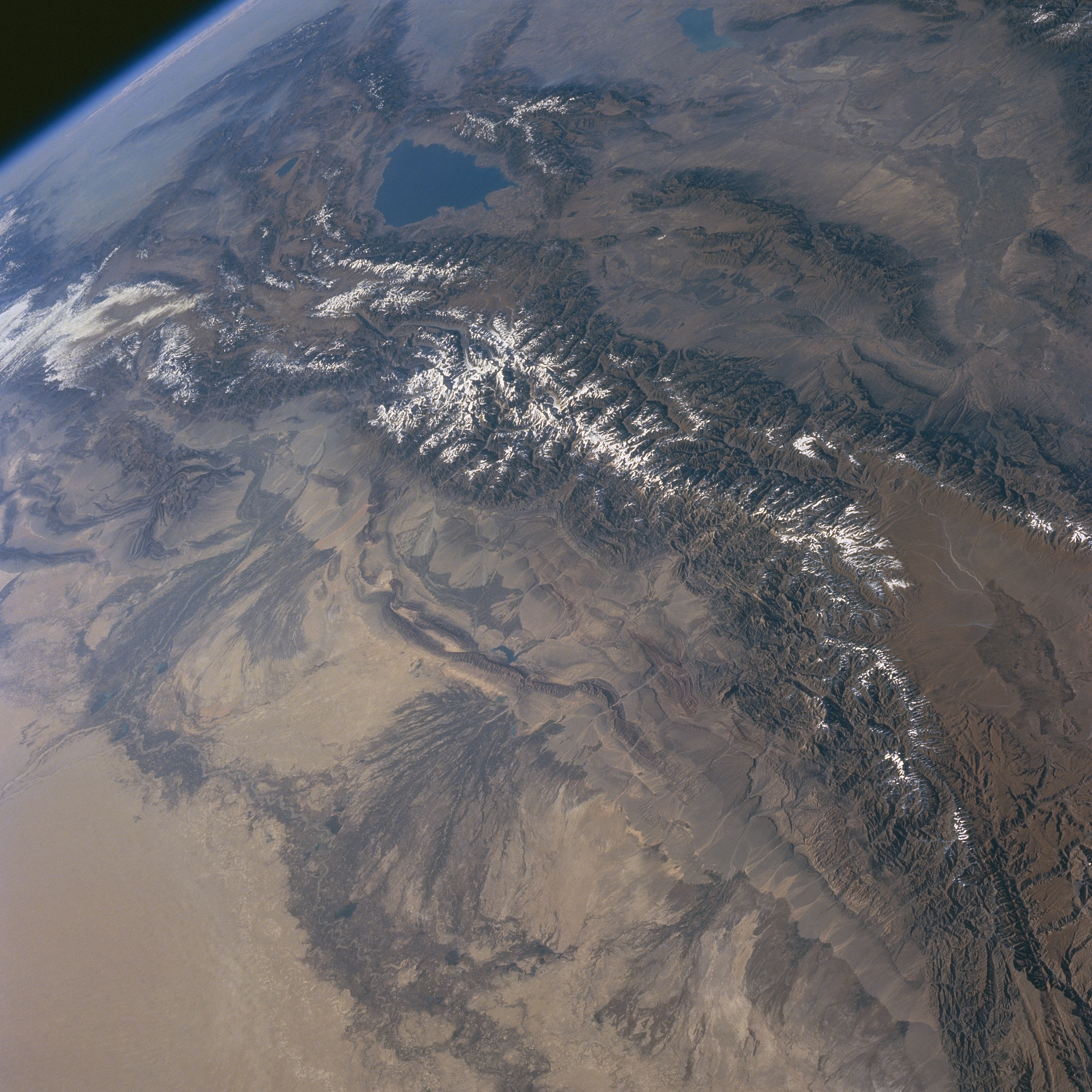
The Tian Shan with the Flaming Mountains at bottom

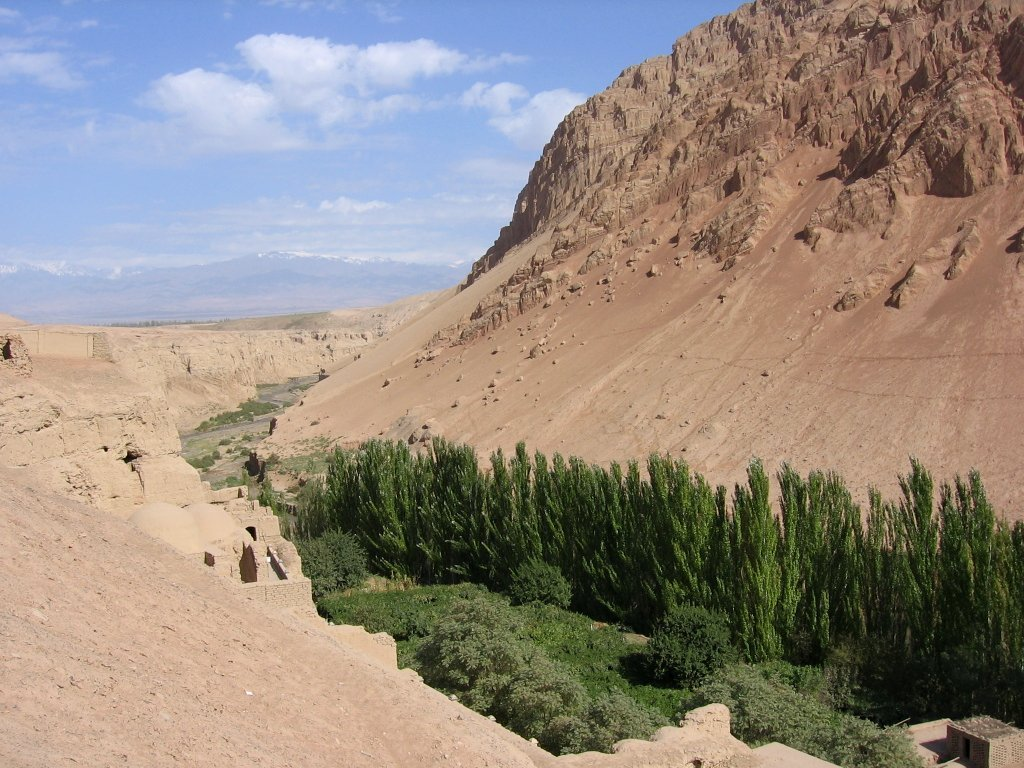
Bezeklik Thousand Buddha Caves on cliffs under the Flaming Mountains

In ancient times, the merchant traders traversing the Silk Route in Southeast Asia avoided the mountains by stopping at oasis towns, such as Gaochang, built on the desert's rim at the foot of the Flaming Mountains and near an important mountain pass. Oasis towns became respite stops for traveling merchant traders. Buddhist missionaries often accompanied traders on busy international trade routes. During this time trade boomed on the Silk Route. Buddhist monasteries and temples were built in the busy trading centers and in nearby remote mountain spots.

The Bezeklik Thousand Buddha Caves site lies in a gorge under the cliffs of the Flaming Mountains near the pass by Gaochang. It is a complex of seventy Buddhist cave grottoes dating from the 5th to the 9th centuries CE, many with thousands of murals of Buddha.

== Literary fame ==
The Flaming Mountains received their name from a fantasy account of a Buddhist monk, accompanied by a Monkey King with magical powers. The monk runs into a wall of flames on his pilgrimage to India in the popular 16th century novel Journey to the West by Ming dynasty writer, Wu Cheng'en. The novel is an embellished description of the monk Xuanzang who traveled to India in 627 CE to obtain Buddhist scriptures and went through a pass in the Tien Shan after leaving Gaochang.

== Mythology ==
According to the classical novel Journey to the West, the Monkey King created a disturbance in the heavens and knocked over a kiln belonging to Laozi, causing embers to fall from the sky to the place where the Flaming Mountains are now.

The Princess Iron Fan possessed the magical Iron Fan, and used it to remove the fire on the Flaming Mountains, though since she only fanned once each time, it would only able to be removed for a year, before the fire started again. The pilgrims encounter an extremely hostile range of volcanic mountains and can only pass if the volcanoes become inactive. Her fan, made from banana leaves, is extremely large and has magical properties, as it can create giant whirlwinds. Using this advantage, she made the residents near there revere her as their goddess, and they would have to give her some food if they want her to solve their problem about the Flaming Mountains.

In an Uyghur legend, a dragon lived in the Tian Shan Mountains. Because the dragon ate little children, an Uyghur hero slew the dragon and cut it into eight pieces. The dragon's blood turned into a scarlet mountain of blood and the eight pieces became the eight valleys in the Flaming Mountains.

== Climate ==
A radiometric land surface temperature of 66.8 °C (152.2 °F) was measured by satellite in 2008. It was the highest recorded land surface temperature on Earth for that specific year.

== Palaeontology ==
There are multiple fossil-bearing formations in and near the Flaming Mountains, such as the Lianmuqin and Subashi formations, which date to the Early and Late Cretaceous respectively. Such the Carcharodontosaurid theropod Kelmayisaurus from the Lianmuqin Formation, and the Tyrannosaurid theropod Tarbosaurs and the Titanosaurian sauropod Nemegtosaurus from the Subashi formation respectively.
