= Institute of Vertebrate Paleontology and Paleoanthropology =

Chinese research institution

The Institute of Vertebrate Paleontology and Paleoanthropology (IVPP; Chinese: 中国科学院古脊椎动物与古人类研究所) of China is a research institution and collections repository for fossils, including many dinosaur and pterosaur specimens (many from the Yixian Formation). As its name suggests, research is focused on both paleontological topics and those relating to human prehistory.

The institution, located in Beijing, grew out of the Cenozoic Research Laboratory in 1929 and is its own institution under the Chinese Academy of Sciences. Its staff have increasingly worked internationally, participating in the China-Canada Dinosaur Project from 1986 to 1991 and authoring or coauthoring forty-five Nature and Science articles from 1999 to 2005. Notable paleontologists who have been affiliated with the IVPP include Yang Zhongjian (also known as C. C. Young), Dong Zhiming, Meemann Chang and Zhao Xijin.

== See also ==
- List of museums in China
