= Dong Zhiming =

Chinese palaeontologist (1937–2024)

- 董枝明
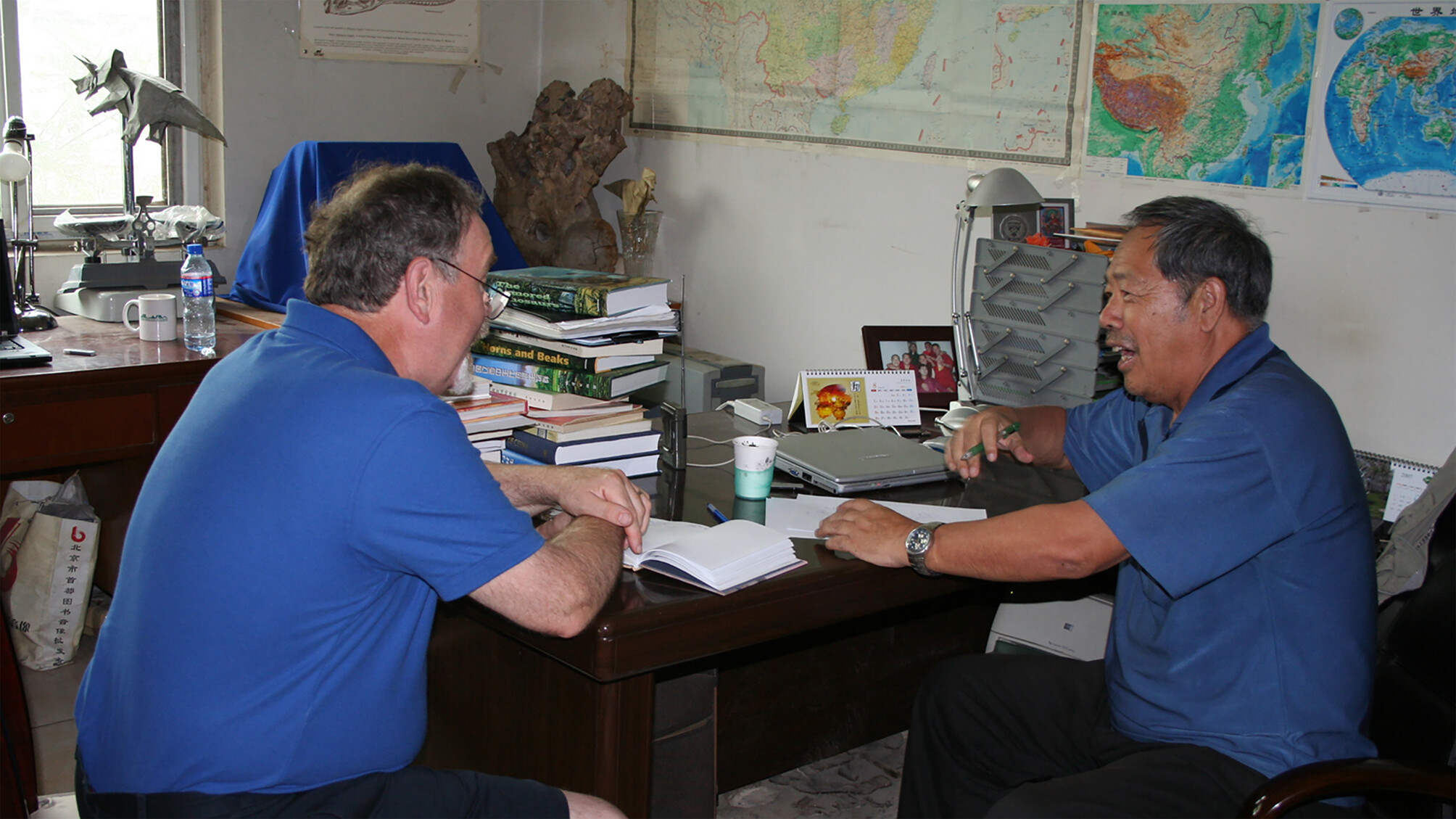
- Peter Dodson (left) and Dong Zhiming (right) in Beijing, 2007
- Born: January 1937; Weihai, Shandong, China
- Died: 20 October 2024 (aged 87); Beijing, China
- Known for: Dinosaur research
- Spouse: Chen Dezhen
- Scientific career
- Fields: Palaeontology
- Workplaces: Institute of Vertebrate Paleontology and Paleoanthropology

Dong Zhiming (Chinese: 董枝明; pinyin: Dǒng Zhīmíng; January 1937 – 20 October 2024) was a Chinese vertebrate paleontologist formerly employed at the Institute of Vertebrate Paleontology and Paleoanthropology (IVPP) in Beijing. He began working at the IVPP in 1962, studying under Yang Zhongjian, who was director at the time. He described fossil remains of many dinosaurs. He investigated and described the Shaximiao Formation; an important contribution to science since they are composed of Middle Jurassic beds which do not commonly yield fossils.

== Early life and education ==
Dong Zhiming was born in January 1937 in Weihai, Shandong. At the age of 13, Dong was introduced to dinosaurs by a museum exhibit showcasing hadrosaur fossils. Dong graduated from university in 1962 with a degree in biology.

== Career ==
After graduating, Dong Zhiming began working at the Institute of Vertebrate Paleontology and Paleoanthropology (IVPP) in Beijing where he was mentored by Yang Zhongjian, the "father of Chinese vertebrate palaeontology". Yang had helped initiate the formal study of fossils in China during the 1920s and continued to lead the field of Chinese palaeontology even after cooperation with foreign institutions ended in 1949. More than a decade later, he no longer participated in field work but was willing to take on Dong as a student, particularly after Dong made it clear he was interested in researching more challenging subjects like dinosaurs as opposed to invertebrates, for which fossils were more abundant and easily transported. Over the next three years Dong authored roughly 600 academic papers in both English and Mandarin. Dong participated in his first field expedition in 1963, aged 26, when he was part of a seven-person team sent by the IVPP to a site 180 miles outside Ürümqi, Xinjiang. On this expedition, Dong discovered fossils of a sauropod dinosaur.

=== Dashanpu bone beds ===
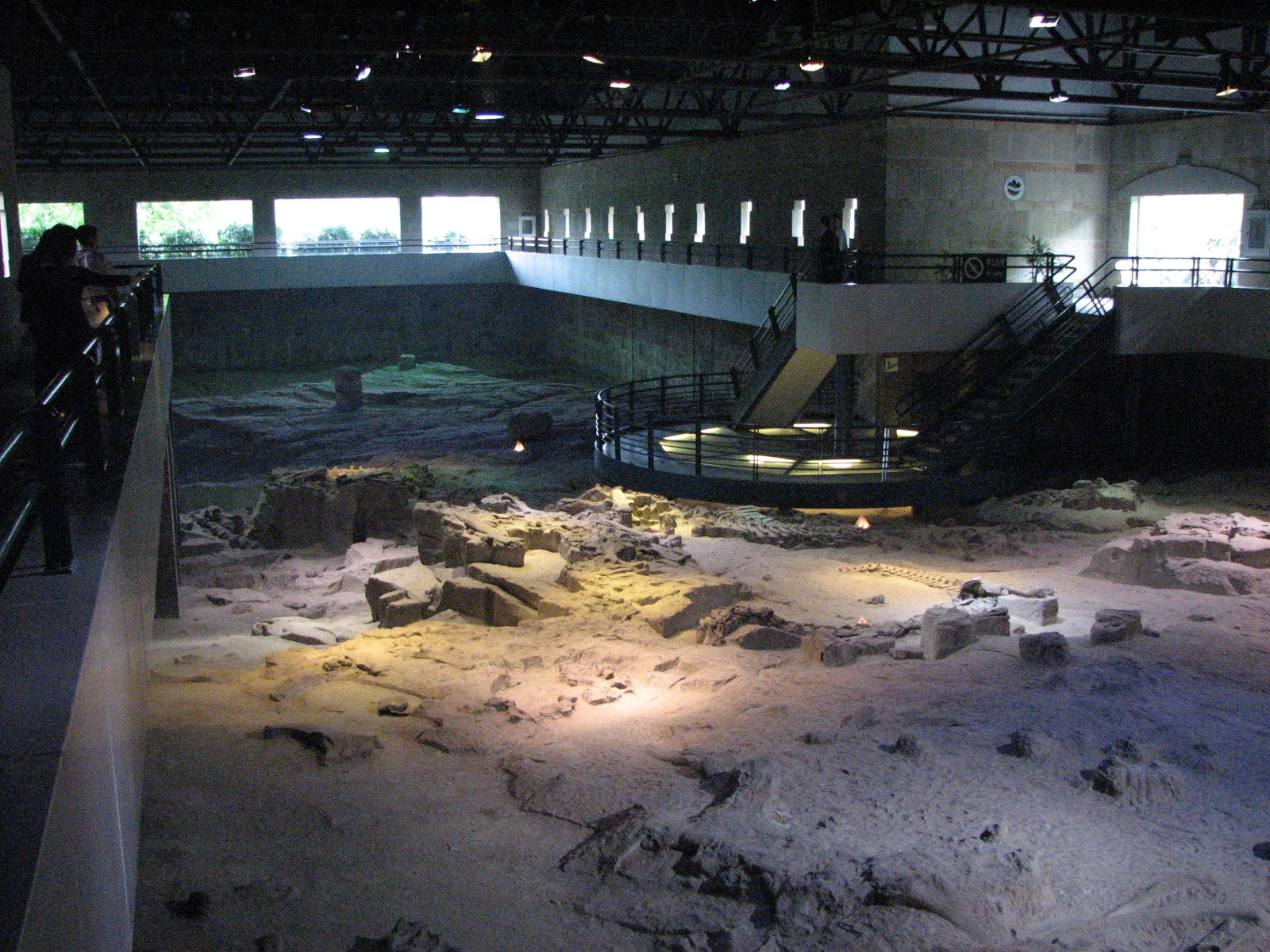
Shaximiao Formation outcropping at the Zigong Dinosaur Museum

Dong Zhiming's palaeontology research halted in 1965 when he became one of many academics ordered to participate in the Down to the Countryside Movement, which saw him and 17 million other privileged youth in China sent to work on farms across the country. Dong worked on a farm in Henan for one year and returned to Beijing just as the Cultural Revolution was beginning. With the IVPP all but shut down, he was reassigned to work on geological surveys in southwestern China where he helped design irrigation systems. Nonetheless, his mentor Yang continued to study palaeontology and met with Dong often, encouraging him to continue his research in addition to his work for the state. Yang also returned to field work during this time, including a 1975 expedition in which he investigated reports of fossils being found by road crews in the town of Dashanpu, Sichuan. Around this time, Dong petitioned the government to reinstate the IVPP's journal - Vertebrata PalAsiatica - and returned to work at the IVPP. One of Dong's first missions after returning to palaeontology was to follow up on Yang's finds at Dashanpu, and in 1976 he discovered the first dinosaur fossils dating to the Middle Jurassic that had ever been found in China. Although this represented a monumental discovery, it would be the last he shared with his mentor: Yang Zhongjian died on 15 January 1979.

As international tensions eased, Dong Zhiming began to cooperate with international researchers in addition to Chinese scientists. After the discovery of fossils at Dashanpu by both him and Yang, Dong returned to the township in 1980 accompanied by a team of scientists from the British Museum. Being familiar with the area, Dong elected to begin their search for fossils at a construction site for a planned natural gas facility which had excavated the top of a nearby hill, and after entering the site he and his colleagues discovered an unexpected treasure trove of fossils. Dong and his team worked to end the construction on the hill, and by autumn the local government agreed to end development at Dashanpu despite having already invested over one million yuan into the project. Dong's research at the site would lead to the formal description of the Shaximiao Formation and the preservation of over 15,000 ft^{2} of dinosaur-bearing bone bed as part of the Zigong Dinosaur Museum.

=== China-Canada Dinosaur Project ===
As work was underway preserving and studying the bone beds at Dashanpu, China entered into the reform and opening up. Accompanied by Sun Ailing, Dong Zhiming visited Alberta, Canada in November 1985. Both a scientific and diplomatic mission, their visit helped initiate the China-Canada Dinosaur Project (CCDP). With $15 million CAD worth of funding, the mission was one of the largest ever mounted in the history of palaeontology and was the first major show of cooperation between Chinese and foreign palaeontologists since 1949. As an international collaboration, Dong Zhiming represented the Institute of Vertebrate Paleontology and Paleoanthropology as one of the project's three leaders; his two co-leaders were Philip J. Currie of the Royal Tyrrell Museum of Palaeontology and Dale Russell of the Canadian Museum of Nature.

The China-Canada Dinosaur Project lasted four field seasons, beginning in May 1986 and ending in 1991. As many as fifty researchers were at work in the field at one time. Expeditions related to the project were undertaken in sites within both countries' borders, including the Canadian Arctic and the Junggar Basin of Xinjiang. In the Junggar Basin, Dong impressed his Canadian colleagues by using dynamite to clear tonnes of overburden without damaging important fossils that had been spotted underneath; these fossils would later become the holotype for Mamenchisaurus sinocanadorum, named in honour of the CCDP. More than 11 new species of dinosaur were described as a result of the CCDP, including a new genus of theropod discovered by Dong in 1987; this dinosaur was later named Sinraptor dongi in his honour.

=== Later career ===
On the advice of his late mentor, Dong Zhiming continued his research into palaeontology with a focus on locating fossils that bridge known periods of dinosaur evolution and explain the gaps in-between. In the 1980s he sparked controversy by suggesting that fossils of the dinosaur Segnosaurus and its relatives belonged to a new order of dinosaur: Segnosaurischia. Historically, all dinosaurs have been categorized as belonging to either the order Ornithischia or Saurischia, and Dong's suggestion of a third order sparked controversy. American palaeontologist Gregory S. Paul offered his support for Dong's theory in 1984, but that Segnosaurus represented evidence not of a third order of dinosaurs but instead that all dinosaurs belonged to a single order. Ultimately, further research into both Segnosaurus and Therizinosaurus proved that the latter was a theropod and that the two belonged to the same order, and so the dinosaurs once proposed as belonging to Segnosaurischia were assigned to the order Saurischia. However, Dong continued to push this third-order theory as late as 2008, shortly before his retirement.

In a 1988 paper authored by Dong and translated into English by Angela Milner, he argued that legendary descriptions of dragon bones in the I Ching and other ancient works could be attributed to Chinese farmers uncovering and misidentifying dinosaur fossils. During his field work, Dong also occasionally encountered modern farmers who believed that large dinosaur fossils were the remains of dragons, and had to convince them otherwise in order to acquire the fossils for study.

Along with co-author Paul Sereno, Dong reviewed his initial description of Huayangosaurus, a stegosaur that he discovered in Dashanpu in 1979 and described in 1982. This 1992 review saw Dong and Sereno determine that Huayangosaurus had a parasacral spine, or a vertebral column which ran adjacent to the sacrum; and that the animal's heightened pedicles may have helped keep its dorsal plates in place without ossified tendons to hold them upright.

== Contributions and recognition ==
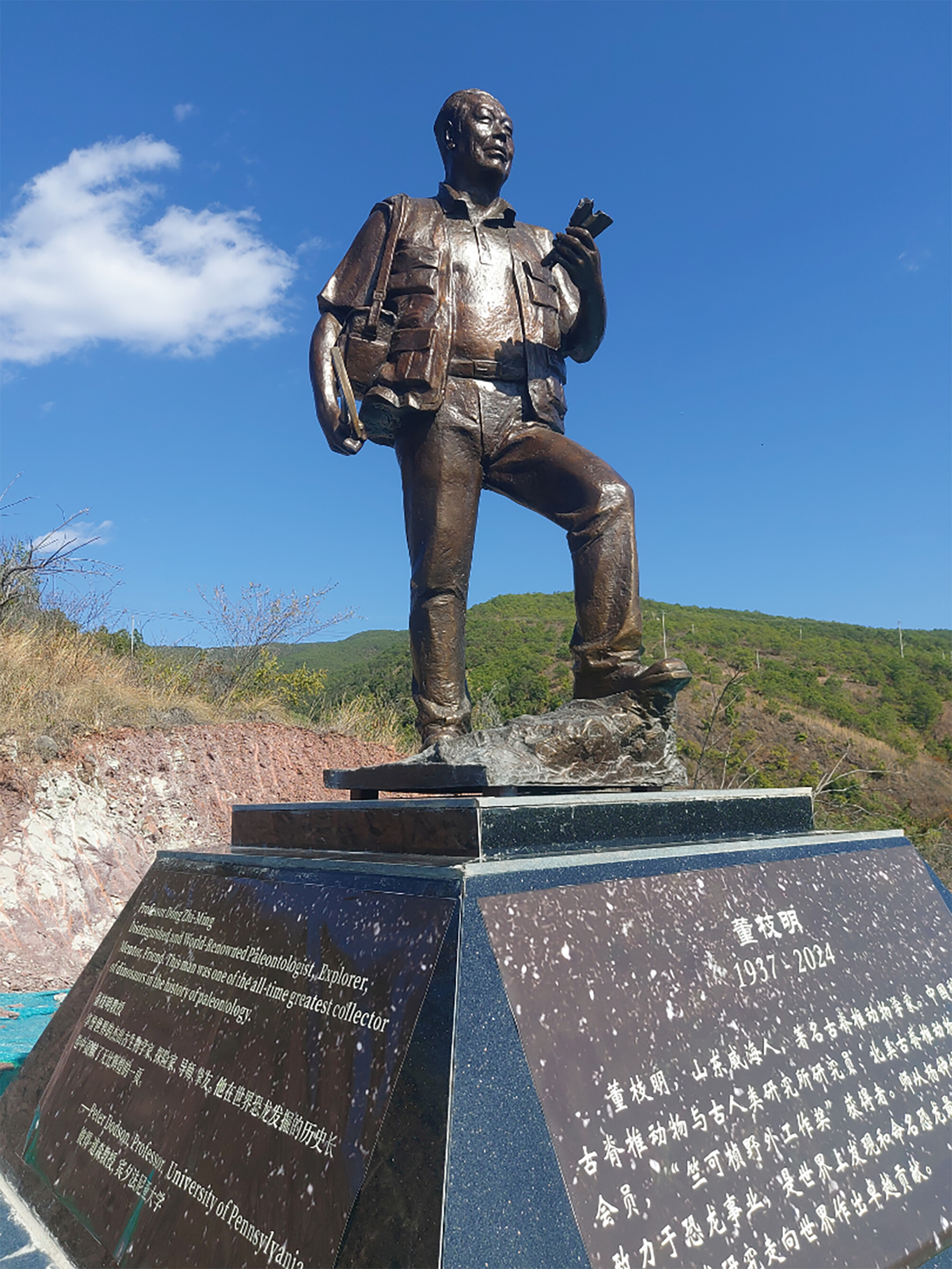
Statue in honor of Dong Zhiming at Lufeng Dinosaur Valley of Yunnan in January 2025

Dong Zhiming has discovered and described more than 42 genera of dinosaurs, of which 27 are still considered valid. A 2008 study found that Dong ranked fourth on a list of people responsible for naming the most dinosaurs; however, when only valid names were counted Dong ranked first, meaning he has named more species of dinosaur than anyone else in history.

While most of Dong's names are still considered valid some have been reassigned to other families. One such example is Micropachycephalosaurus, named by Dong for its apparent relationship to the better-known Pachycephalosaurus, a link that other scientists were less inclined to believe. Studies by Richard J. Butler, Qi Zhao, and other researchers cast doubt on Dong's placement of Micropachycephalosaurus, and in 2011 the genus was reassigned to the suborder Ceratopsia.

Dong is known among the palaeontological community for giving the dinosaurs he describes unusual names, such as T. nedegoapeferima, where the specific name is derived from each of the main cast members from the 1993 film Jurassic Park in recognition of a $25,000 USD donation to the IVPP by American director Steven Spielberg. Likewise, the name he gave the genus Gasosaurus translates to "gas lizard", and ostensibly refers to the natural gas plant which was meant to be built on the Dashanpu hilltop where its fossils were discovered. In addition to this obvious meaning, the Mandarin word for "gas" can also be translated as "making trouble", an apparent reference to Zhiming's struggle with local authorities to preserve the fossil bone beds.

Dong is considered an instrumental part of the reason that China has such an array of known stegosaurid species. In the 2012 textbook The Complete Dinosaur (co-authored by researchers M. K. Brett-Surman, Thomas R. Holtz Jr., and James O. Farlow), Dong and his mentor Yang Zhongjian are praised for their efforts to advance palaeontology's understanding of stegosaurids:

Although the fossil record of stegosaurs for most of Asia is very fragmentary (Averianov et al. 2007; Maidment 2010), that of the People's Republic of China is the longest and most diverse (see Dong 1990, 1992; Olshevsky and Ford 1993; Galton and Upchurch 2004; Maidment et al. 2008; Maidment 2010). A partial skeleton of Chialingosaurus was described by Chung Chien Young (1958) from the Shangshaximiao Formation of Sichuan and, thanks to the efforts of Zhimin Dong, additional parts of this skeleton plus skeletons of two additional genera, Chungkingosaurus and Tuojiangosaurus, are also known (Dong et al. 1983; Peng et al. 2005).

One of Dong's co-leaders on the China-Canada Dinosaur Project, Dale Russell, once claimed that Dong was the best fossil hunter he'd ever met, saying:

On any day of collecting, Dong will have two or three times as many as anyone else.

The metriacanthosaurid Sinraptor dongi, discovered during the China-Canada Dinosaur Project, was named for Dong Zhiming in 1994.

In January 2025, a statue in honor of Dong Zhiming was erected at the Lufeng Dinosaur Valley of Yunnan.

== Personal life and death ==
While working as a surveyor in southwest China in the late 1960s, Dong married IVPP palaeoanthropologist Chen Dezhen. The two had two adult children who were raised by their grandparents while Dong and Chen pursued their careers. The couple lived in an apartment on the IVPP campus in Beijing before retiring to Yunnan in 2008.

Dong died on 20 October 2024, at the age of 87.

== Bibliography ==
Dong wrote or co-wrote a number of books on Chinese dinosaurs, including in English:

- Dong Zhiming (1988). Dinosaurs from China. China Ocean Press, Beijing & British Museum (Natural History). ISBN 0-565-01073-5.
- Dong Zhiming (1992). Dinosaurian Faunas of China. China Ocean Press, Beijing. ISBN 3-540-52084-8.
