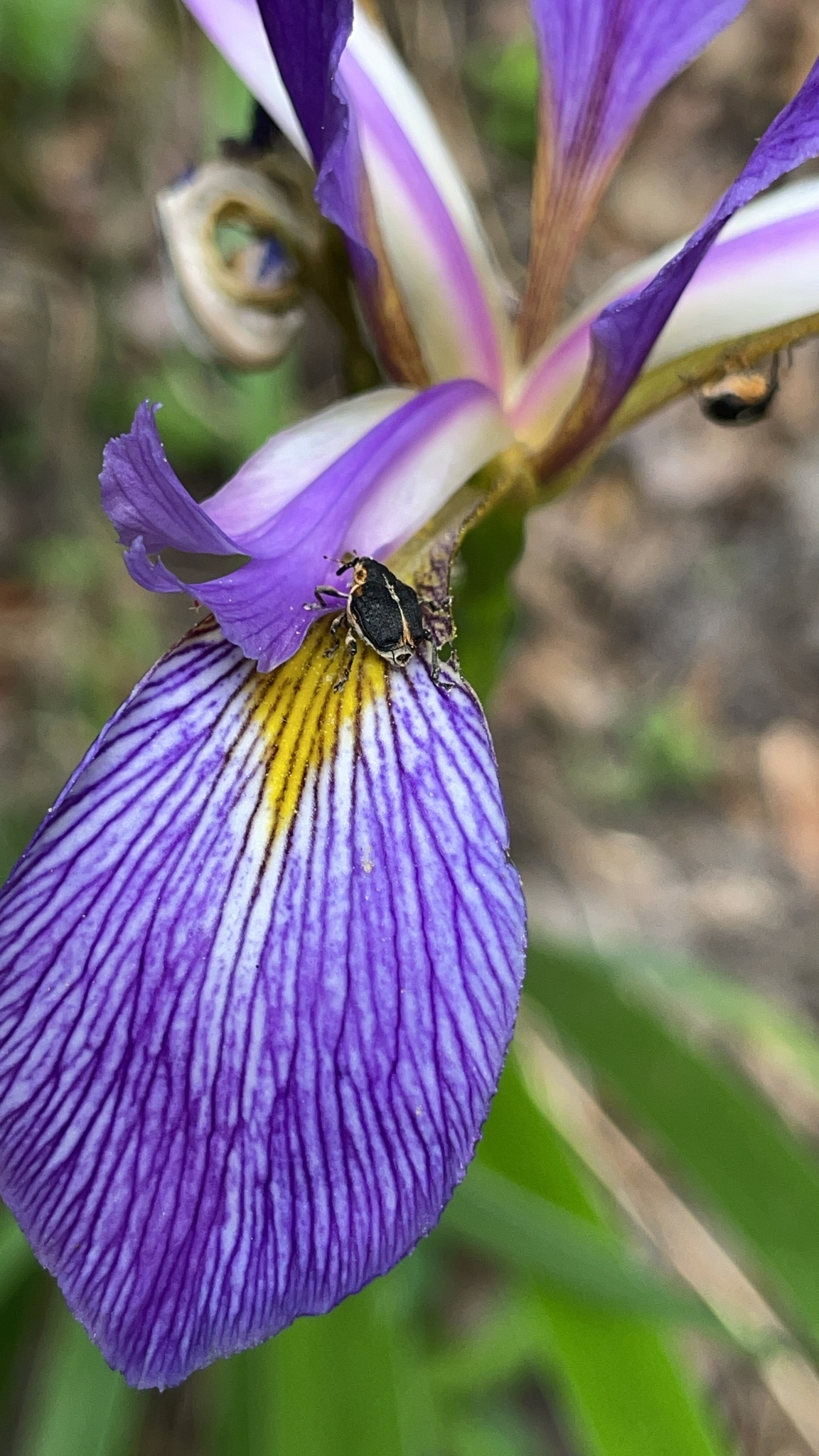

Scientific classification
- Kingdom: Animalia
- Phylum: Arthropoda
- Clade: Pancrustacea
- Class: Insecta
- Order: Coleoptera
- Suborder: Polyphaga
- Infraorder: Cucujiformia
- Family: Curculionidae
- Genus: Mononychus
- Species: M. vulpeculus

Binomial name
- Mononychus vulpeculus (Fabricius, 1801)

= Mononychus vulpeculus =

Species of beetle

Mononychus vulpeculus, the iris weevil, is a species of minute seed weevil in the beetle family Curculionidae.
