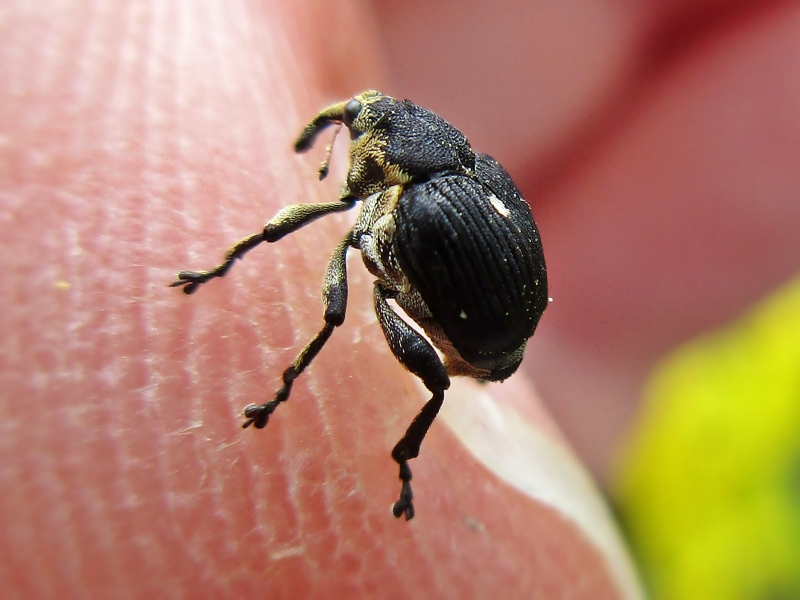
- Mononychus punctumalbum

Scientific classification
- Kingdom: Animalia
- Phylum: Arthropoda
- Class: Insecta
- Order: Coleoptera
- Suborder: Polyphaga
- Infraorder: Cucujiformia
- Family: Curculionidae
- Genus: Mononychus; Germar, 1824

= Mononychus =

Genus of beetles

Mononychus is a genus of minute seed weevils in the family of beetles known as Curculionidae. There are at least 25 described species in Mononychus.

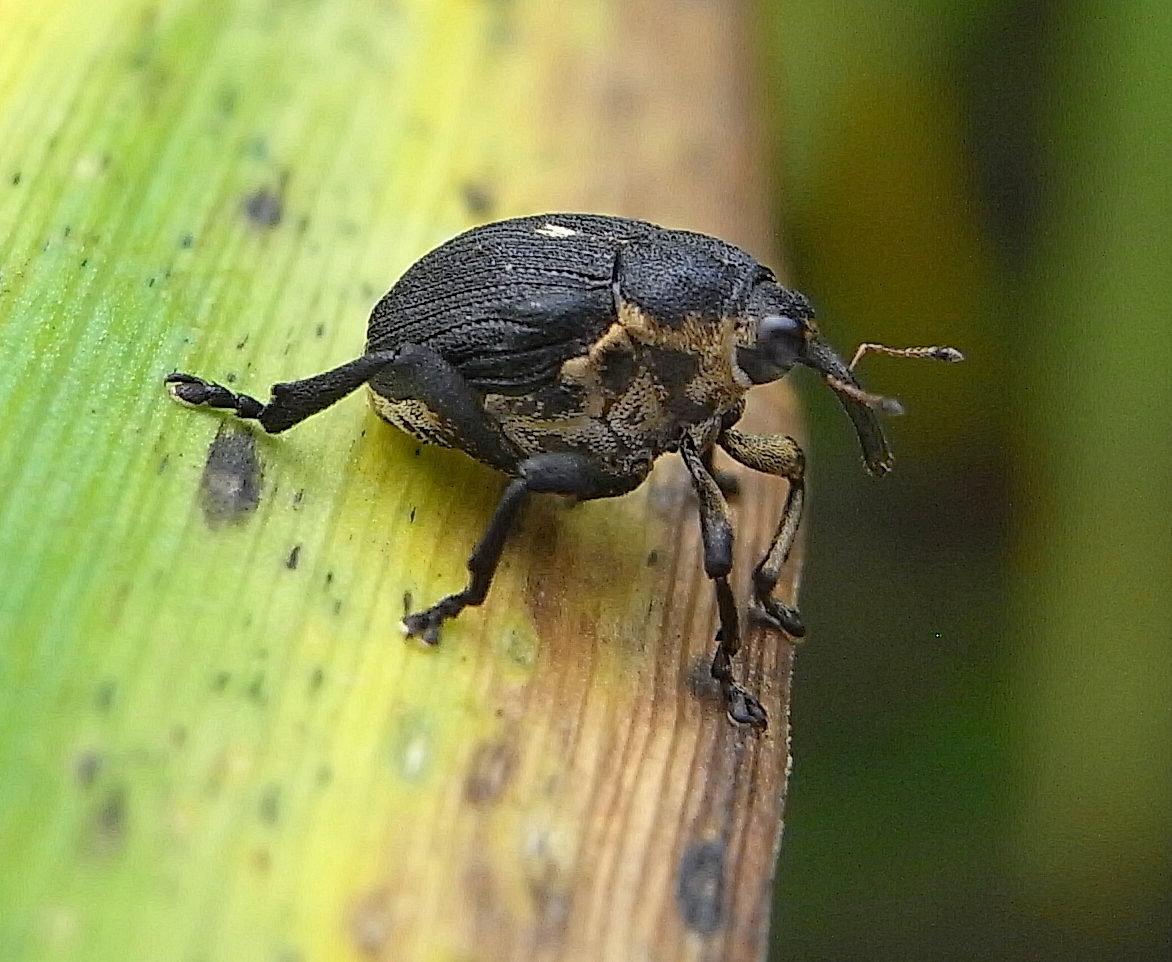
Mononychus punctumalbum

Including Mononychus punctumalbum (Iris Weevil).

They have generally been found in North America, Europe and parts of Central Asia.

They were originally published by E.F.Germar in Insectorum species novae aut minus cognitae, p. 241 in 1823.

== Species ==
These 25 species belong to the genus Mononychus:

- Mononychus algerinus Gandolphe,^{c}
- Mononychus amurensis Schultze, 1898^{c}
- Mononychus angustus Schultze, 1899^{c}
- Mononychus caucasicus Kolen., 1859^{c}
- Mononychus euphraticus Schultze, 1897^{c}
- Mononychus interponens Schultze, 1901^{c}
- Mononychus interruptus Schultze, 1901^{c}
- Mononychus ireos (Pallas, P.S., 1773)^{c g}
- Mononychus kolenatii Kolen., 1859^{c}
- Mononychus pallidicornis Pic, 1900^{c}
- Mononychus pseudacori Schoenherr, 1825^{c}
- Mononychus punctumalbum (Herbst, J.F.W., 1784)^{c g}
- Mononychus quadrifossulatus Chevr., 1872^{c}
- Mononychus rondoui Vuillet, 1911^{c}
- Mononychus salviae Germar, 1824^{c}
- Mononychus schönherri Kolen., 1859^{c}
- Mononychus spermaticus Beck., 1862^{c}
- Mononychus sulcatocarinulatus Schultze, 1901^{c}
- Mononychus superciliaris Boheman, 1844^{c}
- Mononychus syriacus Redtenbacher, 1843^{c}
- Mononychus tangerianus Chevr., 1872^{c}
- Mononychus thompsoni Korotyaev, 1981^{c}
- Mononychus variegatus Brullé, 1838^{c}
- Mononychus vittatus Faldermann, 1835^{c}
- Mononychus vulpeculus (Fabricius, 1801)^{i c g b} (iris weevil)

Data sources: i = ITIS, c = Catalogue of Life, g = GBIF, b = Bugguide.net
