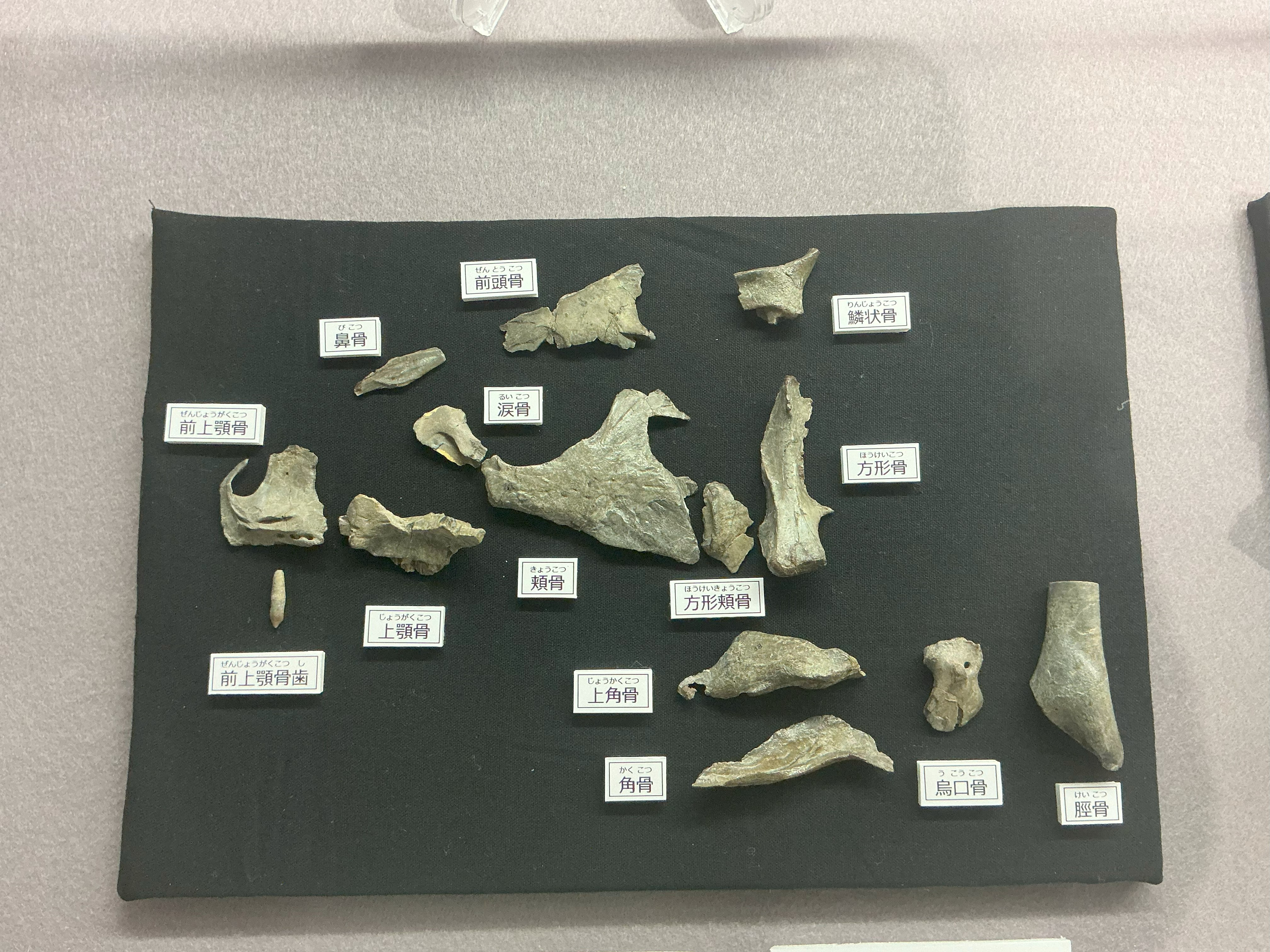
- Holotype specimen

Scientific classification
- Kingdom: Animalia
- Phylum: Chordata
- Class: Reptilia
- Clade: Dinosauria
- Clade: †Ornithischia
- Clade: †Ceratopsia
- Clade: †Neoceratopsia
- Genus: †Sasayamagnomus; Tanaka et al., 2024
- Species: †S. saegusai

Binomial name
- †Sasayamagnomus saegusai Tanaka et al., 2024

= Sasayamagnomus =

Sasayamagnomus Temporal range: Early Cretaceous, 112.1 Ma

Genus of ceratopsian dinosaurs

Sasayamagnomus (meaning "gnome from Sasayama") is an extinct genus of neoceratopsian dinosaur from the Early Cretaceous (Albian age) Ohyamashimo Formation of Hyōgo Prefecture, Japan. The genus contains a single species, Sasayamagnomus saegusai. The holotype individual is estimated to reach 80 centimetres (2.6 ft) long, although this specimen is not fully grown.

== Discovery and naming ==
Sasayamagnomus was found at the Miyada microvertebrate site in Tamba-Sasayama city, Hyōgo Prefecture. It is known from 17 assorted cranial bones, the right coracoid and a left tibia. The presence of two right nasals in the material suggests that at least two individuals were represented. Before its formal description, the fossil material was mentioned in a conference abstract in 2023.

The holotype is specimen MNHAH D1-060516, and it was formally described as a new genus and species of neoceratopsian in 2024. The generic name Sasayamagnomus is named after the Sasayama Basin, from where the bones were collected, and the Latin word for gnome, gnomus. The specific name saegusai honors the late Dr. Haruo Saegusa, who was the leader in dinosaur excavation in the Tamba area, and was a significant contributor to vertebrate paleontology in the Hyogo Prefecture.

== Classification ==
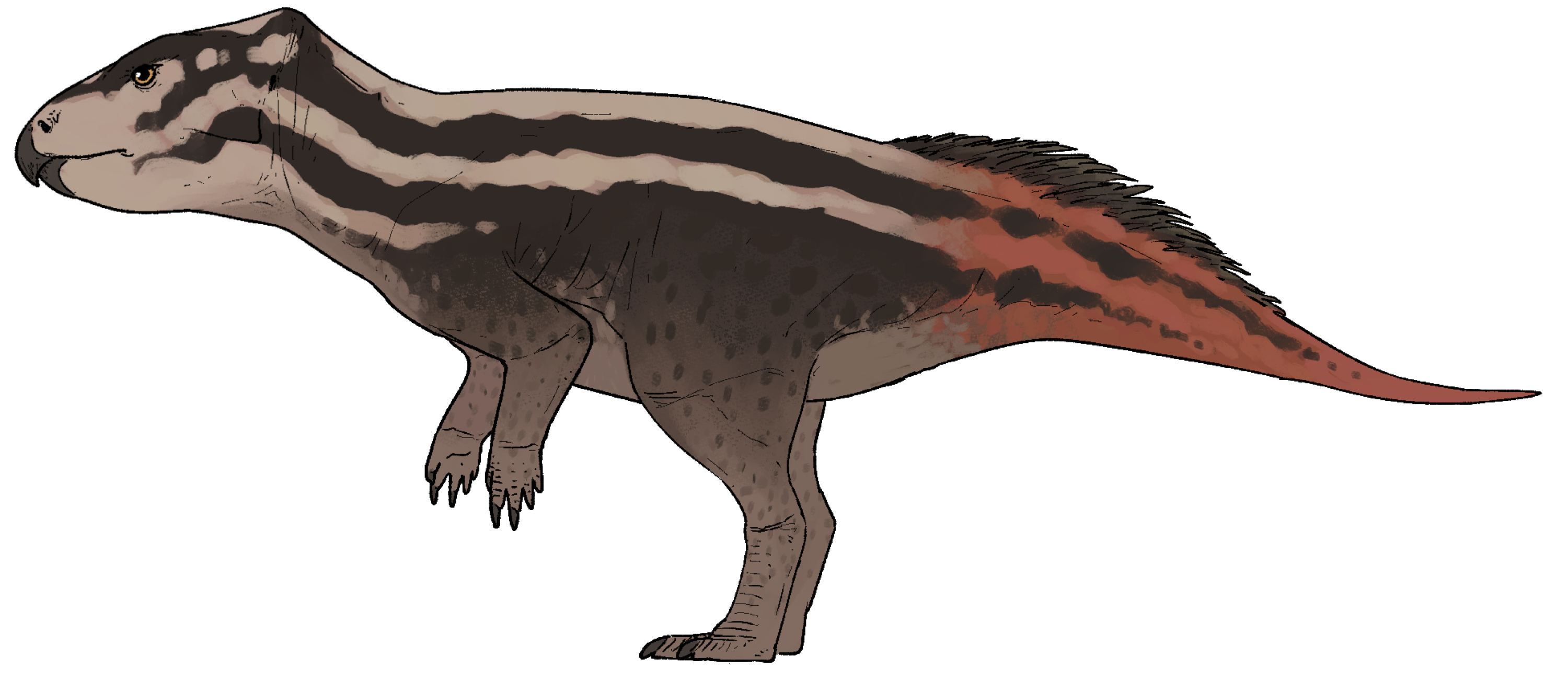
Speculative life restoration

In their phylogenetic analyses, Tanaka et al. (2024) recovered Sasayamagnomus as the sister taxon to Aquilops in a basal neoceratopsian clade also containing Auroraceratops. Their results are displayed in the cladogram below:

- Ceratopsia
  - Psittacosaurus spp.
  - Chaoyangsauridae
  - Neoceratopsia
    - Stenopelix
    - Liaoceratops
    - - Mosaiceratops
      - Asiaceratops
      - - Archaeoceratops
        - - - Auroraceratops
            - - Aquilops
              - Sasayamagnomus
          - - Koreaceratops
            - Helioceratops
            - 'Graciliceratops'
            - Yamaceratops
            - Leptoceratopsidae
            - Coronosauria
              - Protoceratopsidae
              - - Ajkaceratops
                - Ceratopsoidea

== Paleoecology ==
Sasayamagnomus is known from the Ohyamashimo Formation (Sasayama Group), which dates to the early-middle Albian age from the end of the Early Cretaceous. These layers are predominantly made up by sandstones, mudstones and conglomerates. The depositional environment represents a fluvial system with a subhumid to semi-arid climate. Dinosaur teeth are common in various localities throughout this formation including those belonging to other theropods (dromaeosaurids, therizinosaurs and tyrannosauroids) as well as sauropods, ankylosaurs and iguanodontians. Several dinosaurian oospecies (egg fossils) have also described, including Himeoolithus, Subtiliolithus, Nipponoolithus and Prismatoolithus. The monstersaurian lizard Morohasaurus, the titanosauriform sauropod Tambatitanis, and the troodontid theropod Hypnovenator are also known from the formation. Although not specified as this Formation in original descriptions, Sasayama Group have some other fossil fauna known, such as eutheria Sasayamamylos, scincomorph Pachygenys, and two frogs, Hyogobatrachus and Tambabatrachus.

== See also ==
- Timeline of ceratopsian research
