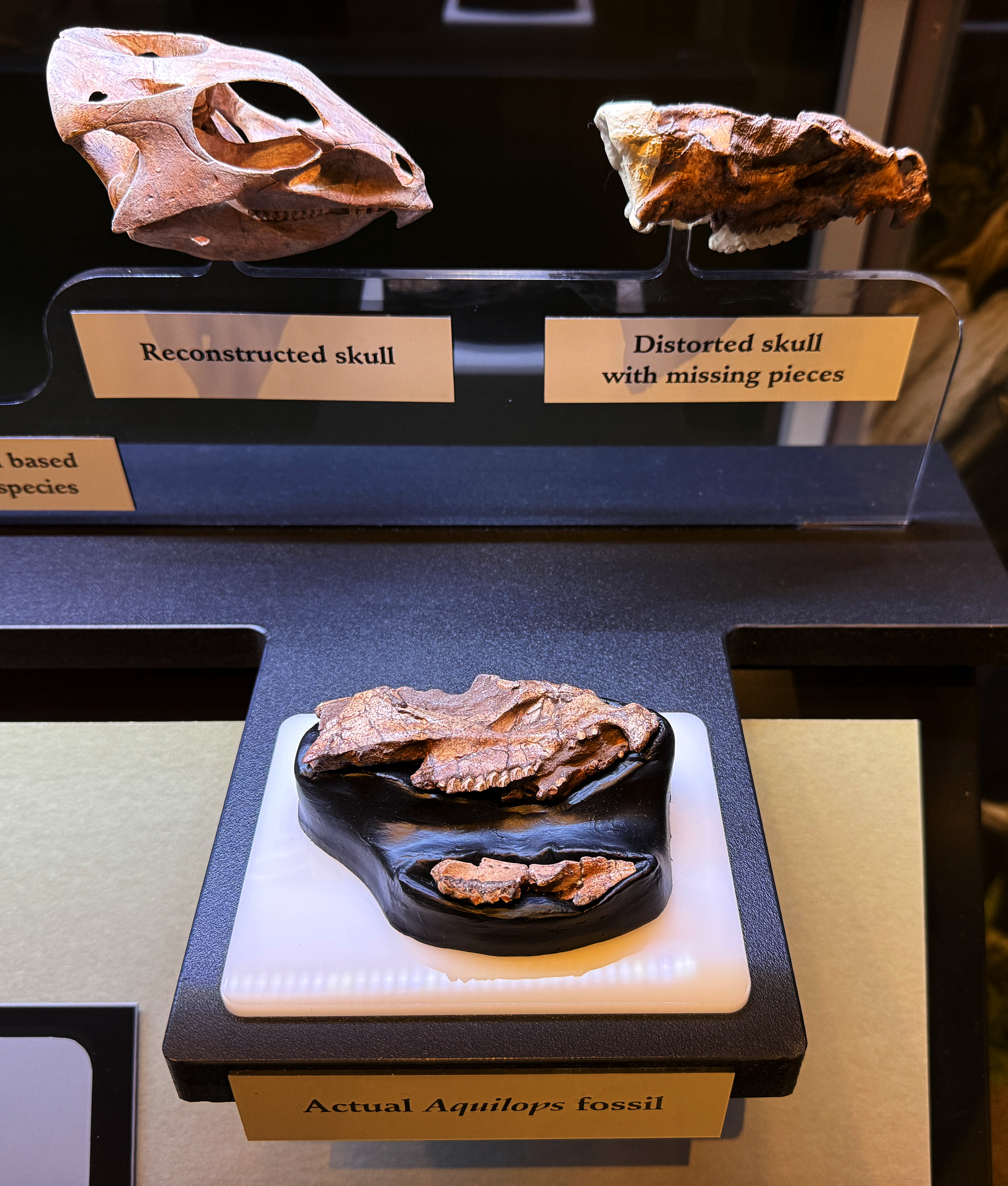
- Holotype skull (below) with reconstruction and replica (above) as exhibited in Sam Noble Oklahoma Museum of Natural History

Scientific classification
- Kingdom: Animalia
- Phylum: Chordata
- Class: Reptilia
- Clade: Dinosauria
- Clade: †Ornithischia
- Clade: †Ceratopsia
- Clade: †Neoceratopsia
- Genus: †Aquilops; Farke et al., 2014
- Species: †A. americanus

Binomial name
- †Aquilops americanus Farke et al., 2014

= Aquilops =

Aquilops Temporal range: Early Cretaceous, 107 Ma

Extinct genus of dinosaurs

Aquilops is a genus of ceratopsian dinosaur that lived in North America during the Early Cretaceous, about 109–98 million years ago. The only known specimen, a skull of a subadult, was found in 1997 in the Cloverly Formation of Carbon County, southern Montana, and became the basis of the new genus and species Aquilops americanus in 2014. The genus name is derived from the Latin and Greek words for "eagle" and "face", in reference to the dinosaur's hooked beak, and the specific name refers to North America, since it was the first early neoceratopsian (a ceratopsian with a neck-frill) found there. The holotype specimen consists of a partial skull and lower jaws of a probably subadult individual. Aquilops was prominently featured in the 2025 film Jurassic World Rebirth, an occasion used for scientific outreach by the Sam Noble Oklahoma Museum of Natural History where the holotype is housed.

Aquilops was a small neoceratopsian, and the only known skull is 84.2 mm (3.31 in) long as preserved, from which a total length of about 60 cm (24 in) and a weight of about 1.6 kg (3.5 lb) have been extrapolated. A fully grown Aquilops would probably have been 1 m (39 in) or less. As an early ceratopsian, it would probably have been bipedal. The upper margin of the skull in front of the eyes is steeply inclined, and the skull is triangular when seen from the top. Aquilops is unique in that the rostral bone at the front of the snout is strongly hooked and has a boss at the front edge. The rostral forms a unique, concave profile in front of the upper teeth. The antorbital fossa (a depression in front of the orbit or eye socket) is unique in being twice as long as tall and in tapering to a sharp point below the orbit.

Aquilops is one of the oldest known ceratopsians from North America, and was more closely related to Asian ceratopsians than to North American ones. This suggests there was an interchange of neoceratopsians between North America and Asia during the Aptian. Aquilops has been found to be one of the most basal (early diverging) neoceratopsians, with one study finding it to be the sister taxon of Sasayamagnomus from Japan. Aquilops would have been a plant-eater, using its hooked beak to nip at vegetation. The Cloverly Formation is dated to either the Albian or Cenomanian stages of the Early Cretaceous. The Himes Member of the formation which Aquilops is known from represents a braided river system.

== Discovery and naming ==
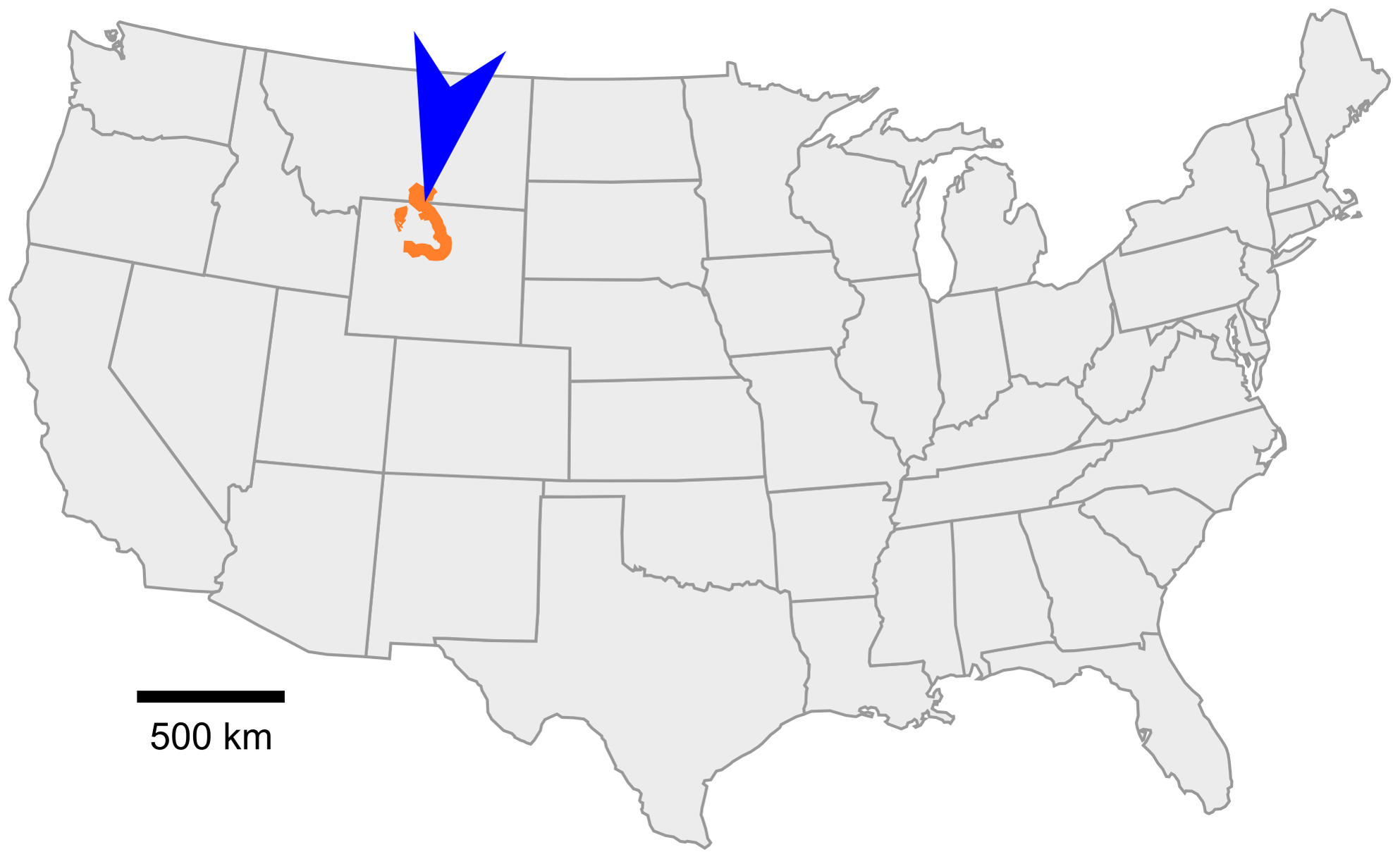
Holotype locality (blue arrow) within Cloverly Formation outcrops (orange)

In 1997, an expedition funded by the National Geographic Society and led by the paleontologist Richard L. Cifelli of the Sam Noble Oklahoma Museum of Natural History surveyed Lower Cretaceous rocks along the border of Montana and Wyoming. In the Cloverly Formation of Carbon County, southern Montana, the volunteer paleontologist Scott K. Madsen noticed a grapefruit-sized bit of white on a rock, picked it up and noticed it contained teeth, realizing it was a skull of rare size. He brought it to his camp, where it was already clear the teeth belonged to a plant-eating dinosaur, assumed by researchers to belong to Zephyrosaurus, the only dinosaur of that size known from there. Madsen prepared the skull under a microscope, and discovered it did not match the other animal, but, based on its beak, belonged to a little ceratopsian (horned) dinosaur. Until then, the Early Cretaceous fossil record of this group from North America consisted of isolated teeth and bones that could not be further identified and provided little information about the early evolution of this group there.

Holotype skull held by lead-describer Andrew A. Farke to show scale

After finishing the preparation of the skull, Madsen turned it over to researchers he was working with at the Sam Noble Museum, where it was catalogued as specimen OMNH 34557. Cifelli and the paleontologist W. Desmond Maxwell began work on a scientific description, but other commitments postponed it. Cifelli's graduate student Mathew J. Wedel moved into the same town as the paleontologist Andrew A. Farke, who had experience with ceratopsians, and suggested he be brought onto the project, which commenced in 2010. By this time, there had been many rumors of an Early Cretaceous ceratopsian skull from Montana, so Farke was pleased to join. Wedel described his own role in the project as "social glue" and drawing the skull reconstruction.

While originally meant to be a short article, the authors decided to write a longer monograph article to cover the specimen more compherensively, with room for additional information and figures. In 2014, the specimen was made the holotype of the new genus and species Aquilops americanus by Farke, Maxwell, Cifelli, and Wedel. The generic name is derived from the Latin word aquila, meaning "eagle", and the Greek ὤψ, ops, meaning "face", in reference to the dinosaur's hooked beak. The specific name americanus refers to the species being the first unequivocal early neoceratopsian (a ceratopsian with a neck-frill) found in North America. The online article contained downloadable 3D models based on surface scans of the skull (which anyone can 3D print) as well as paleoart life restorations by the artist Brian Engh, with additional artwork made to publicize the specimen.

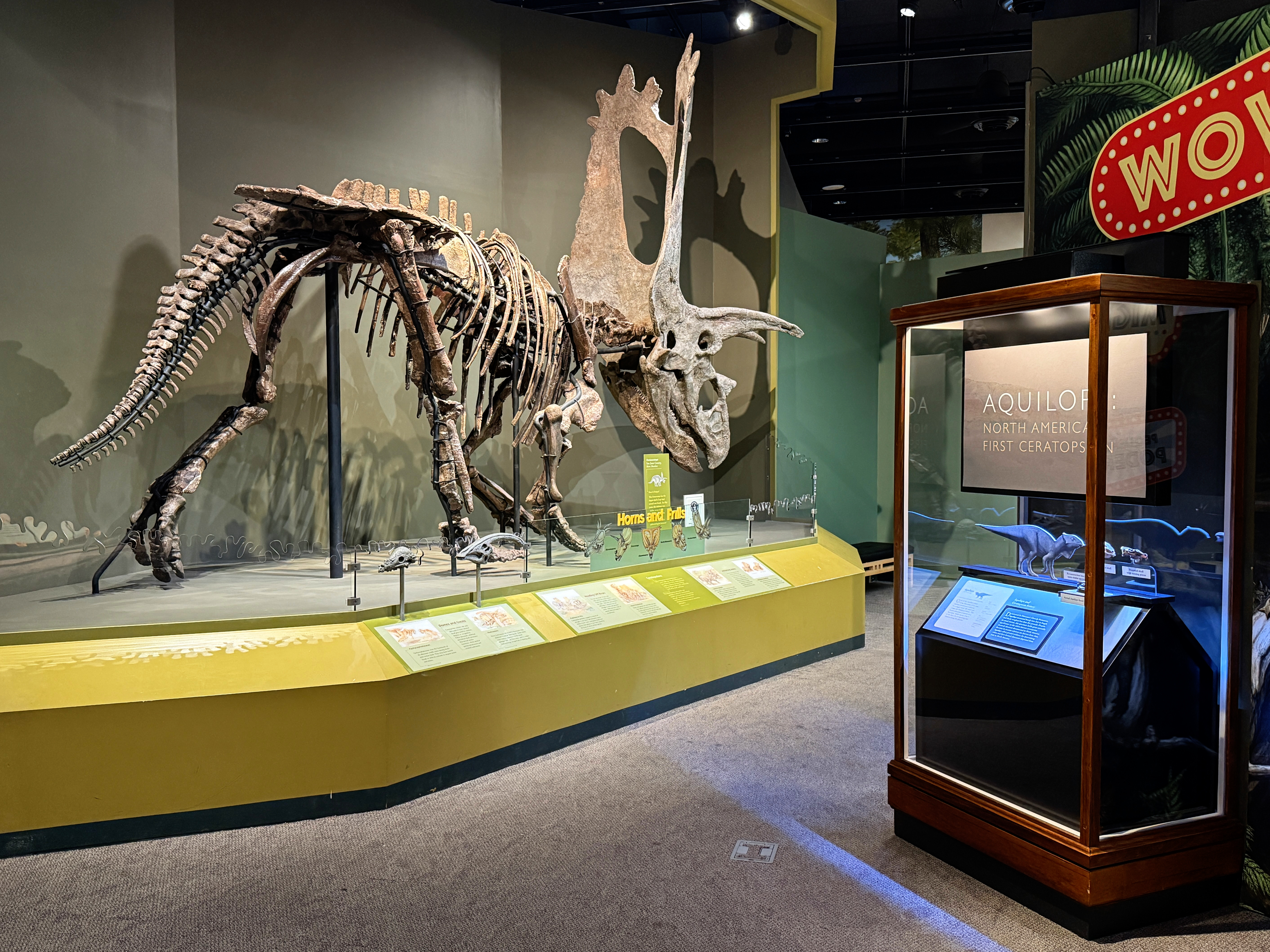
Aquilops exhibit next to Pentaceratops skeleton at the Sam Noble Museum

The holotype consists of a partial skull with associated predentary (frontmost bone of the lower jaw which formed the lower beak) and partial left dentary (tooth-bearing bone) of the lower jaws, along with unidentified fragments. The skull is somewhat skewed to the right, along with some compression from side to side and top to bottom, which mainly affects the upper part. The right side of the skull is more complete and better preserved than the left. The front end of the nasal bones (the frontmost bone of the skull roof), the braincase, and most of the palatal bones are missing. The specimen was probably a subadult individual. The lemon-sized skull is exhibited in Sam Noble Museum's Hall of Ancient Life alongside a Pentaceratops, which holds the Guinness World Record for having the largest skull known among dinosaurs, and was one of the largest and latest North American ceratopsians.

Farke stated in a blog post associated with the publication that the age of the specimen could not be determined through sectioning due to the lack of limb bones, which are the most reliable way of determining growth stages. Since dinosaur features can change as they age, naming new species based on young specimens can be problematic, but Farke noted that even if the skull belonged to a young individual, it was distinct enough in features that would be stable throughout life, so that they would be recognizable in an adult. While only the skull was known, the authors wanted to include the body in the artwork used to publicize the find by Engh, which they based on better known relatives such as Archaeoceratops and the more distantly related Psittacosaurus, since the body-plans of early ceratopsians were fairly similar.

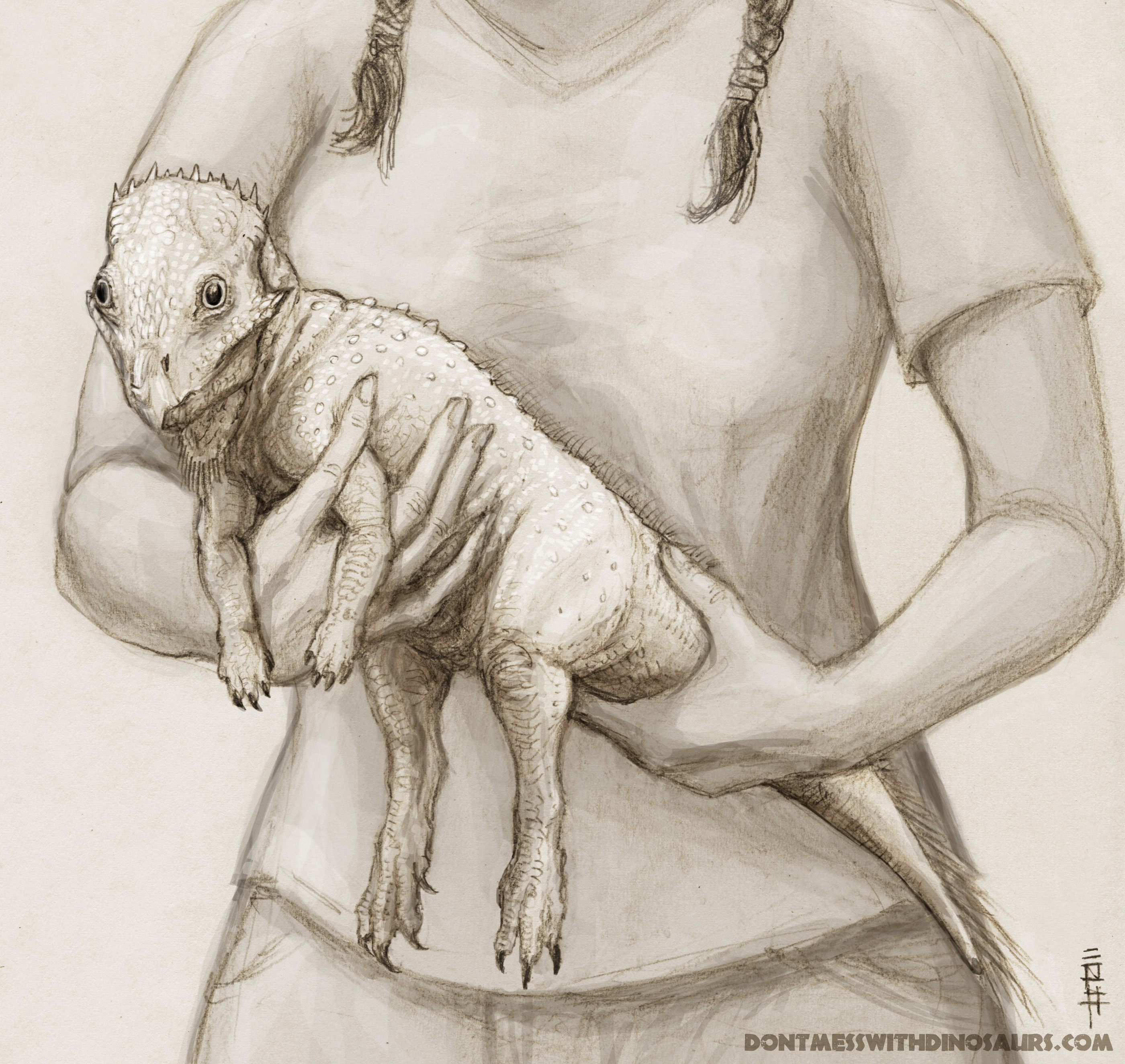
Publicity artwork showing Aquilops being held by a human

Farke explained to science reporters that Aquilops was significant for being about 20 million years older than the next oldest ceratopsian dinosaur from North America known at the time, and about 40 million years older than the iconic Triceratops. He added that the authors were surprised that Aquilops was more closely related to Asian ceratopsians than to North American ones, and that this left him wondering when the ancestors of the other horned dinosaurs of North America immigrated there.

In 2025, Aquilops was prominently featured in the film Jurassic World Rebirth and widely appeared in its promotion and merchandise. In the film, an Aquilops nicknamed "Dolores" is carried in a backpack, which was realized through animatronics so that the actors could interact with it. This occasion was subsequently used for scientific outreach. The city of Norman, where the Sam Noble Museum is located, recognized June 29 through July 5, 2025, as Natural History Week in honor of its newest "paleo-celebrity" and its scientific significance. To celebrate the appearance in the film, the museum hosted Aquilops Day on July 19 with various activities, including presentations by paleontologists. Madsen, Wedel, and Farke expressed excitement over the film and satisfaction at how accurately the dinosaur was depicted, with Wedel stating "I started out as a dinosaur-obsessed little kid, and I was lucky to pursue a career in paleontology. Now Aquilops is going to be a lot of kids' favorite dinosaur, and maybe it will help inspire the next generation to explore and discover."

== Description ==
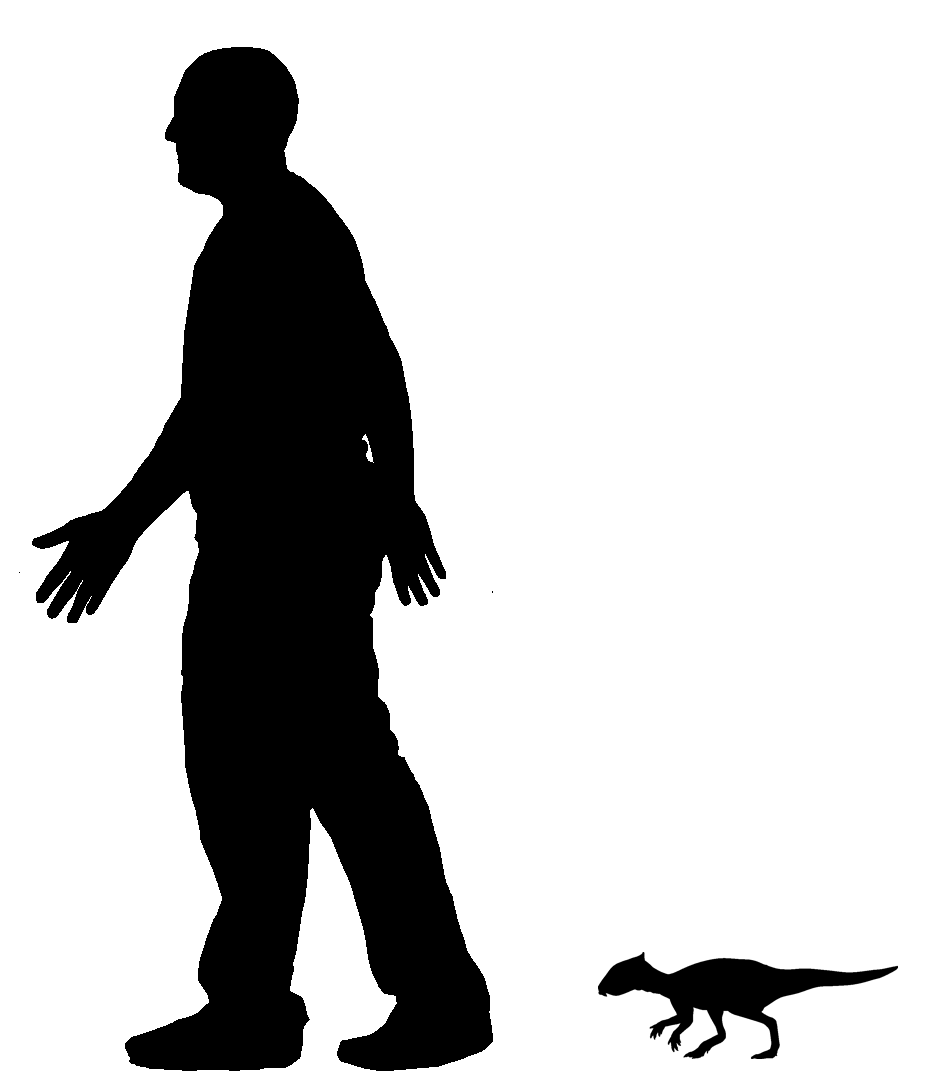
Size compared to a human

=== Skull ===
Aquilops was a small neoceratopsian, and the only known and presumably subadult skull is 84.2 mm (3.31 in) long as preserved, from the tip of the rostral bone (the frontmost bone of the snout which formed the upper beak in ceratopsians) to the tip of the jugal bone ("cheek" bone) at the back. It is 60% the size of the presumed adult Liaoceratops and Archaeoceratops holotype specimens, but the same size as a juvenile Liaoceratops. The predentary bone is 22.6 mm (0.89 in) while the preserved part of the dentary is 30.3 mm (1.19 in). Extrapolating from Archaeoceratops, Wedel estimated the total body length of Aquilops to have been about 60 cm (24 in) and its weight about 1.6 kg (3.5 lb) in a blog post. He noted its size had variously been compared to that of a raven, rabbit, or a cat. He added that a fully grown Aquilops would have been larger, though not much more than Archaeoceratops, probably 1 m (39 in) or less in total length. As an early ceratopsian, Aquilops would have had a large head, long hindlimbs, shorter forelimbs, a long tail, and probably been bipedal.

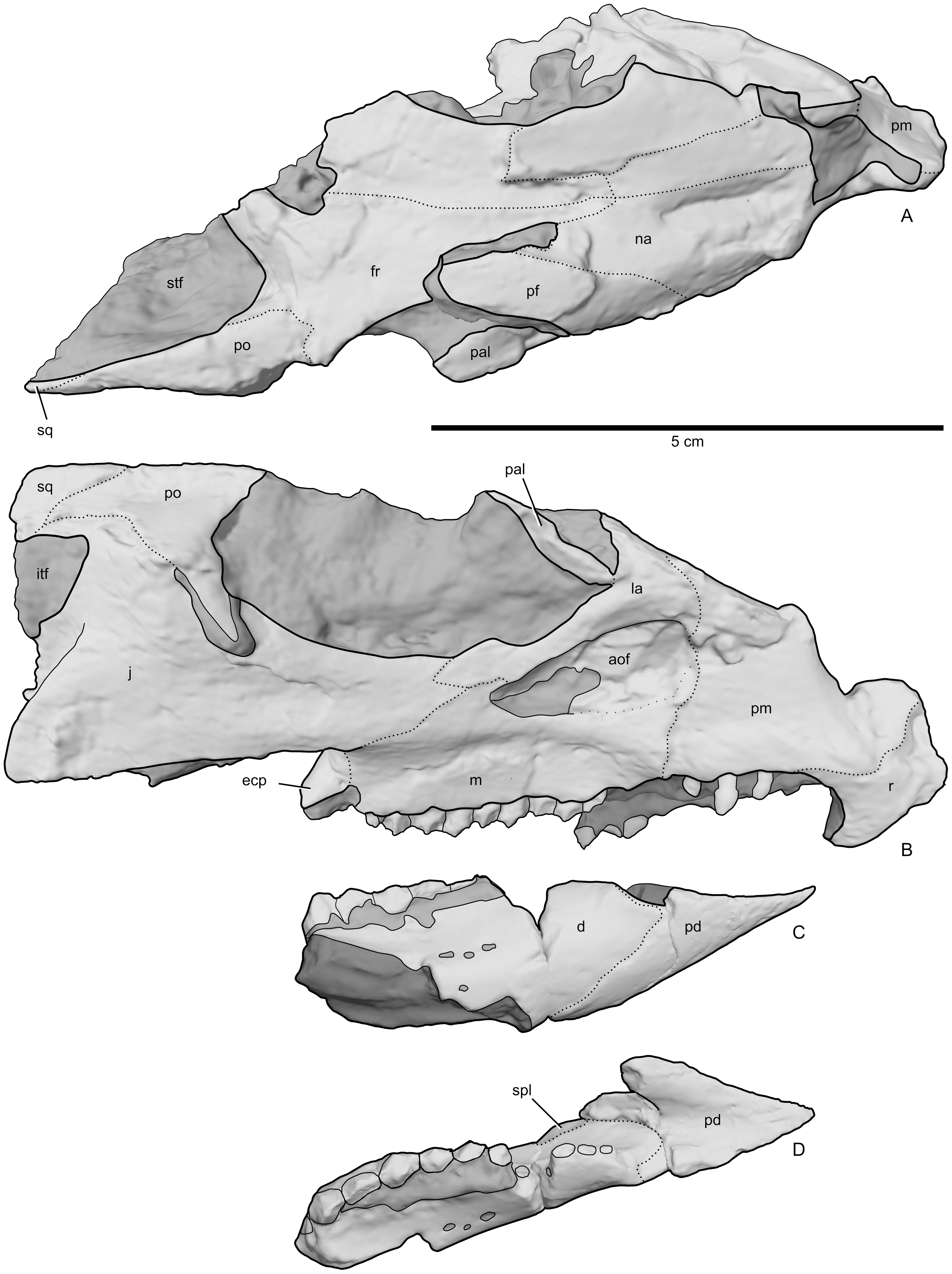
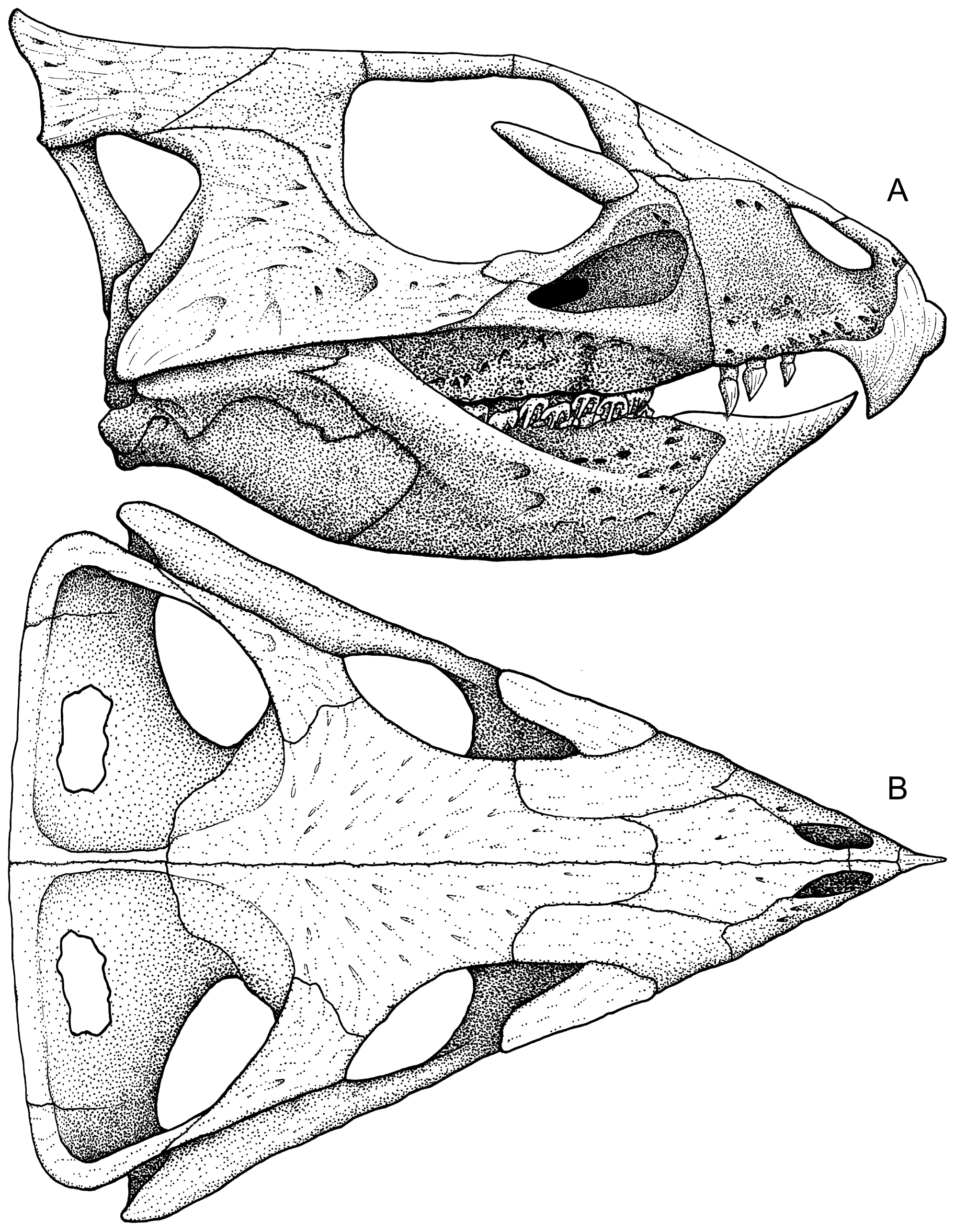
Interpretative diagram of the skull (left) and reconstruction (right) from the side and above

Various features indicate the holotype was not fully grown. The orbit (eye socket) is comparatively large in relation to the skull and the bones are not very textured, and based on reconstructed growth series of other ceratopsians, this supports it not being fully grown. Proportionally large orbits are a juvenile feature in many vertebrate animals. Other features, such as the accessory ridges of the maxillary teeth being well-defined and the contact between the jugal and lacrimal bone in front of the orbit being elongated, are found in many adults but not necessarily in juveniles. This combination of features along with its intermediate size indicates it was a subadult. The upper margin of the skull in front of the eyes was steeply inclined compared to the portion behind. The width of the frontal bones in relation to the surrounding part indicates that the skull was triangular when seen from the top, though maybe not as strongly as in larger species. The lesser triangularity may be due to the specimen being juvenile, similar to what is seen in Protoceratops.

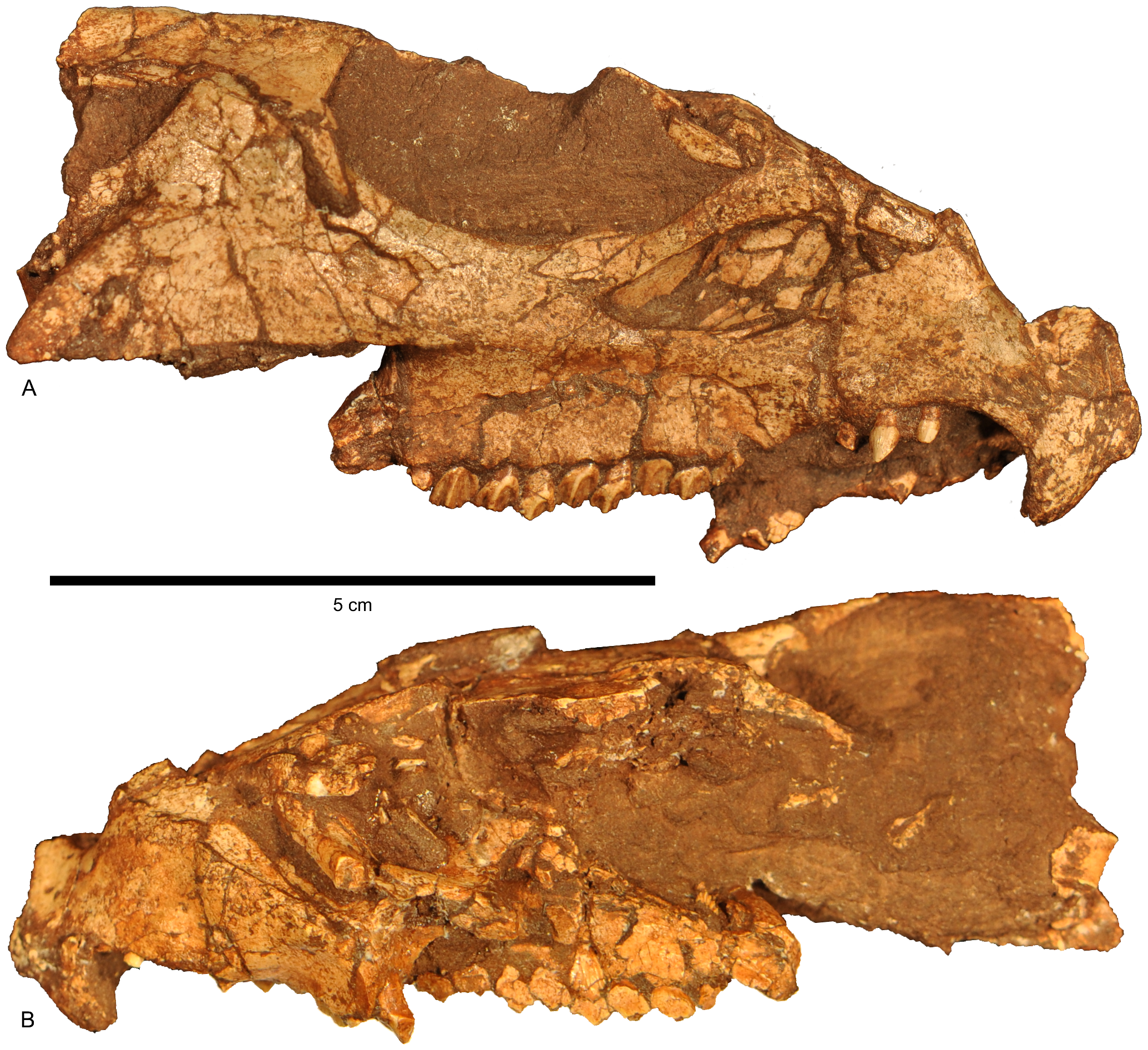
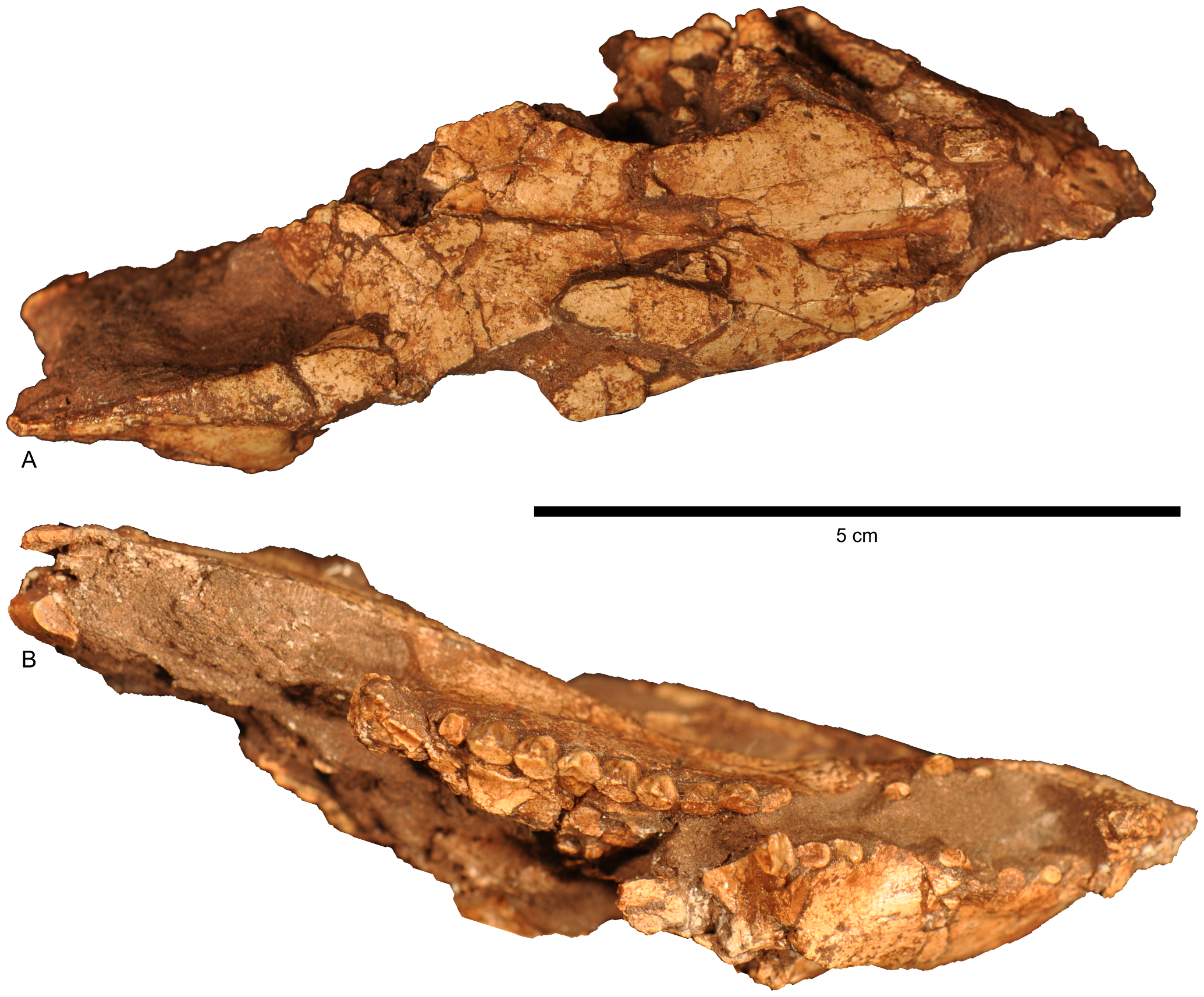
Skull shown from the right and left sides (left), above, and below

The front surface of the rostral bone is sharply keeled, more so than in Yamaceratops, but less than in Protoceratops and Leptoceratops. There is a boss or rugosity at the midline front edge of the rostral, which is unique among ceratopsians. The boss is 5.3 mm (0.21 in) long by 1.2 mm (0.047 in) tall. Farke noted that he did not think this feature was a displaced piece of bone or pathological (caused by damage) due to its texture not matching that, and would have been present in the live animal. The side profile of the front edge of the rostral is strongly arched, in contrast to the more gently arched edge in other ceratopsians. The lower margin of the rostral is strongly hooked, and when articulated with the premaxilla (the frontmost tooth-bearing bone of the upper jaw) behind it, the rostral tip forms a nearly 90-degree angle with the line of the upper tooth row of the maxilla (the hindmost tooth-bearing bone), a distinct feature of Aquilops. This angle is much broader in other neoceratopsians, for example about 150 degrees in Liaoceratops, and makes the rostral tip point downwards.

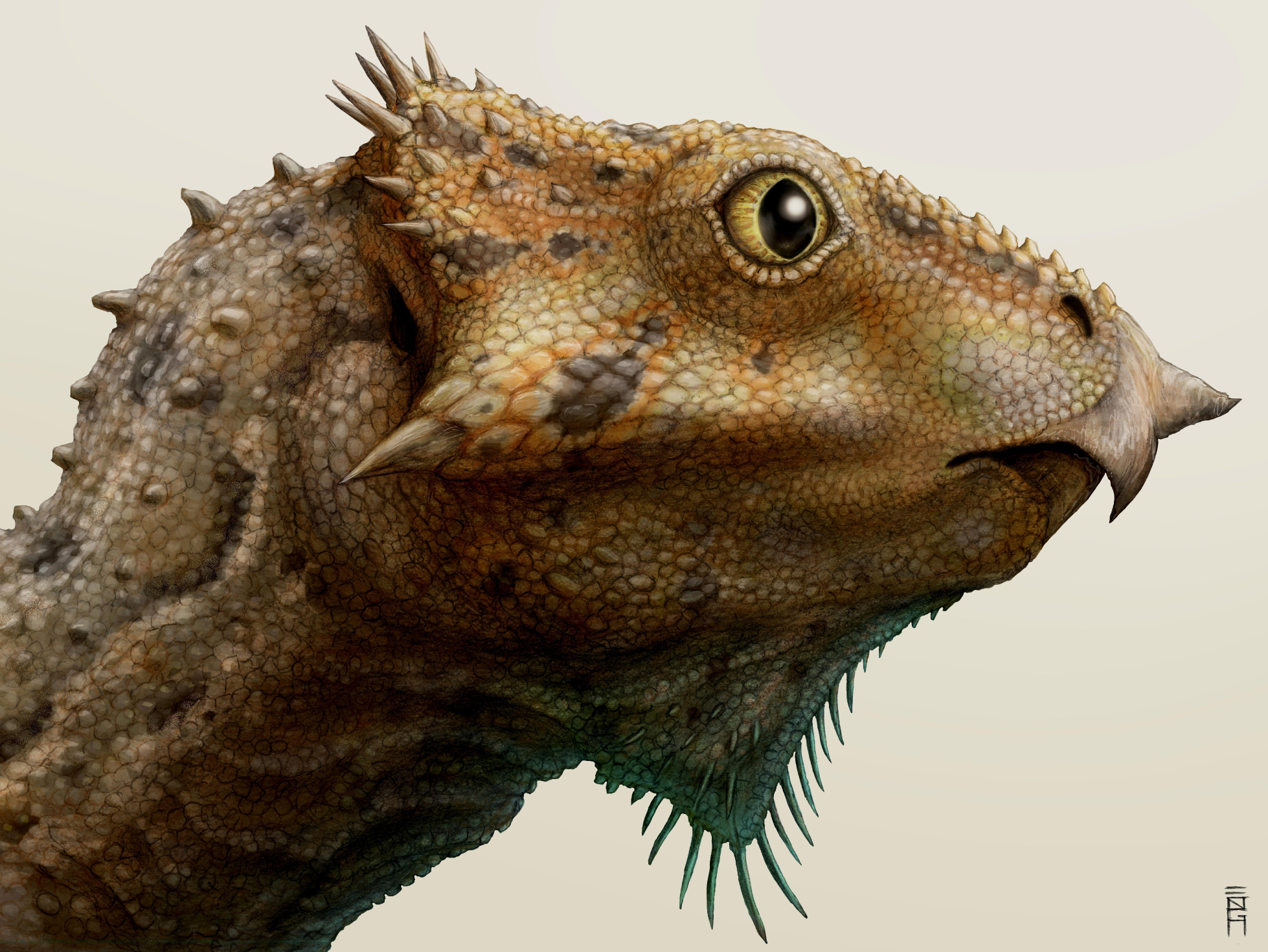
Hypothetical life restoration of the head

The premaxilla is roughly triangular in side view, and its lower border is straight. In front of the premaxillary tooth row, the underside of the upper jaw is entirely concave, distinguishing the genus from related genera. The external naris (bony nostril) is 9 mm (0.35 in) long as preserved, small in proportion to the orbit and the antorbital fossa (a depression in front of the orbit), typical for neoceratopsians. The external naris is angled 60 degrees to horizontal, and the preserved part of its margin indicates it was elliptical. Seen from below, the premaxilla is broadest at its midpoint, and is pinched at the front and back, where it connects with the rostral and maxilla, respectively. Taking distortion into account, the row of alveoli (tooth sockets) of the premaxilla would have been in line with the tooth row of the maxilla, and not outside the line, as is the case in other ceratopsians that have premaxillary teeth.

The upper surface of the nasal bone is relatively flat and untextured, as in many other ceratopsians outside Coronosauria. The antorbital fossa is elongated from front to back, triangular, tallest at the front end, deepest at its hind end, and its lower border is almost horizontal. The fossa is twice as long as high and tapers to a sharp point below the orbit, distinguishing Aquilops from related genera in which the fossa is more circular. Though the shape of the orbit is obscured by crushing, it appears to have been longer than tall. The palpebral bone above the orbit of Aquilops (which formed a bony "brow") is broadest where it attaches with the prefrontal (a bone above the orbit) and lacrimal bones, and tapers at its outer end. The lacrimal bone inserts into the jugal bone below the orbit along a V-shaped contact area, as is widespread among neoceratopsians, whereas this area is fairly linear in most Psittacosaurus specimens.

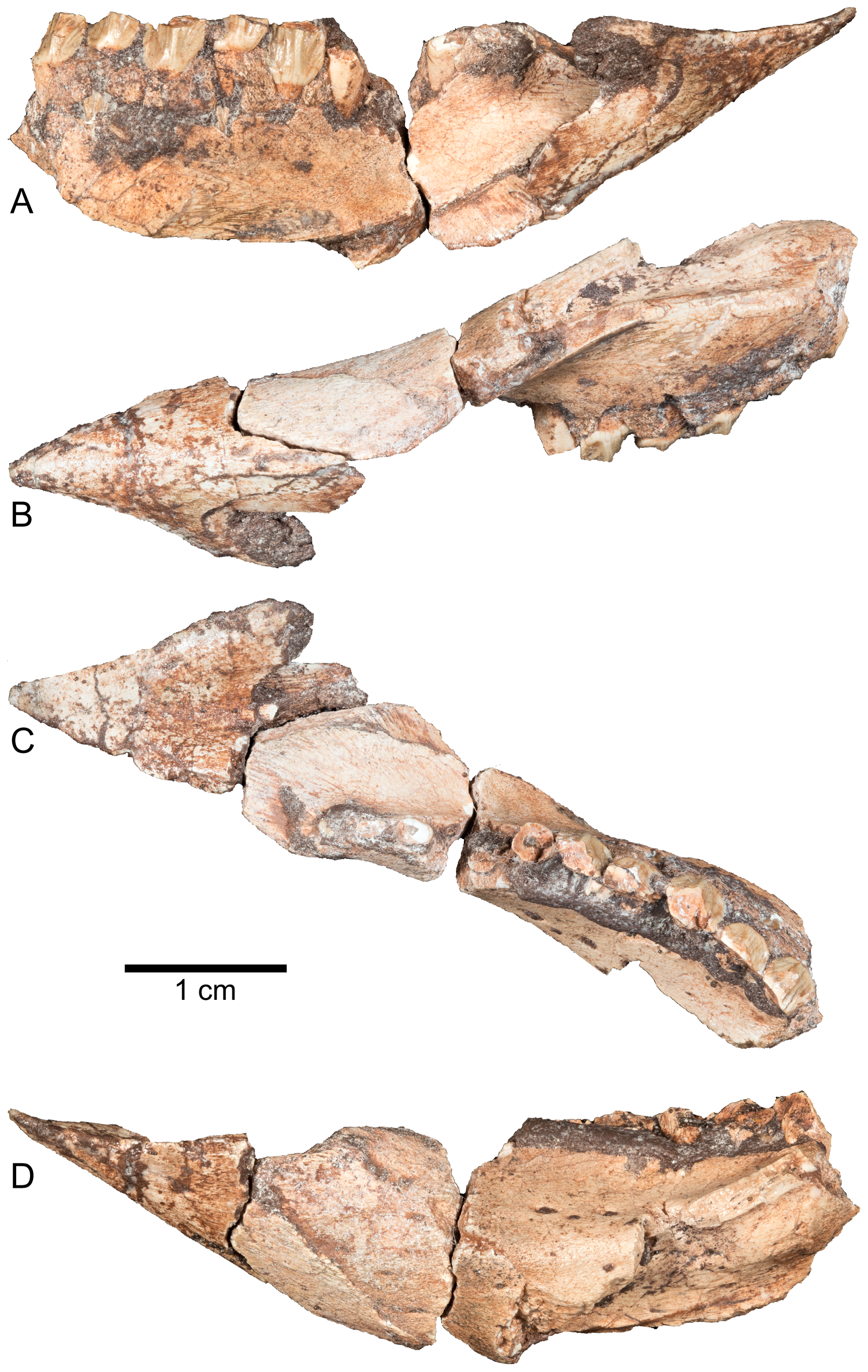
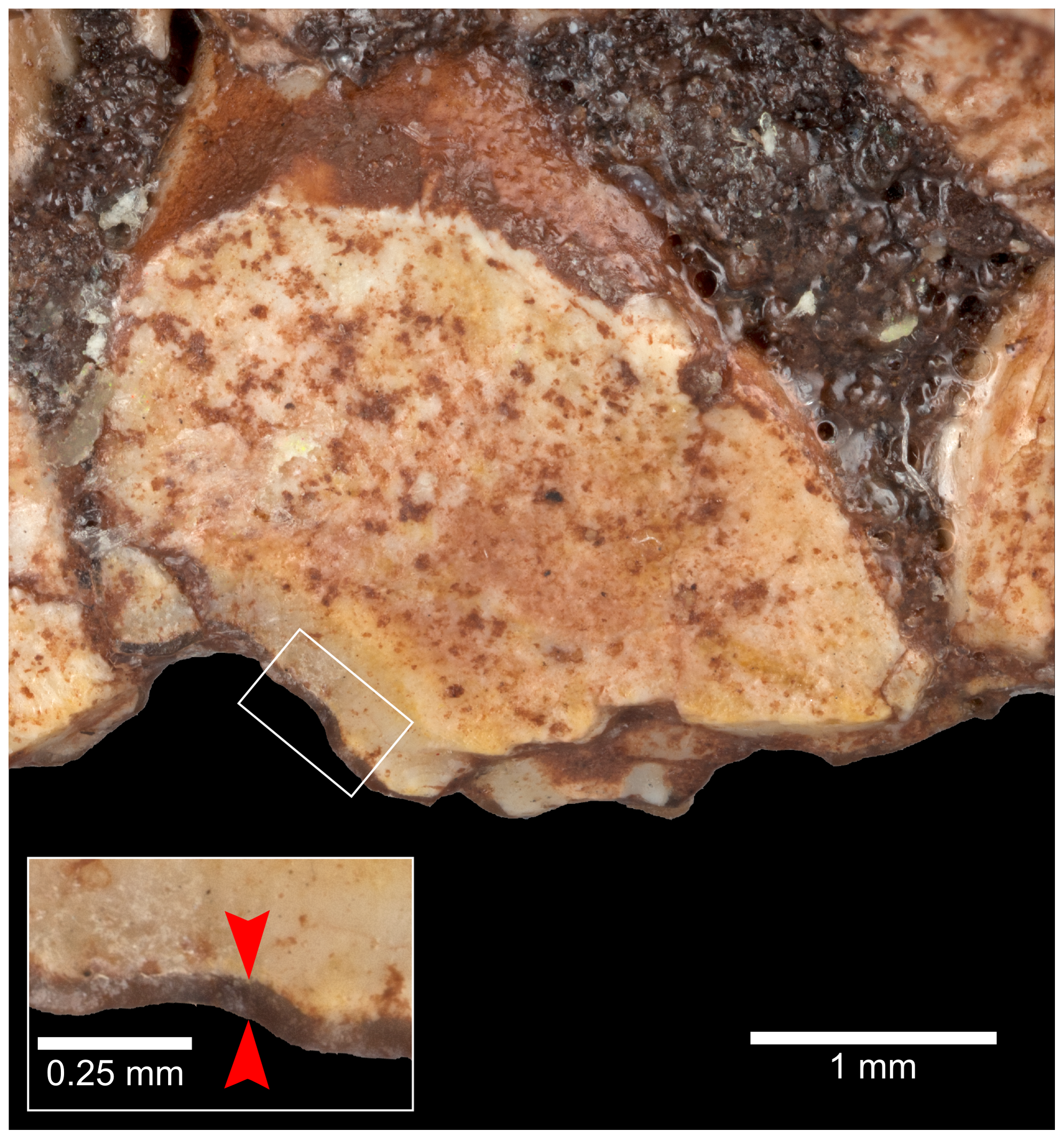
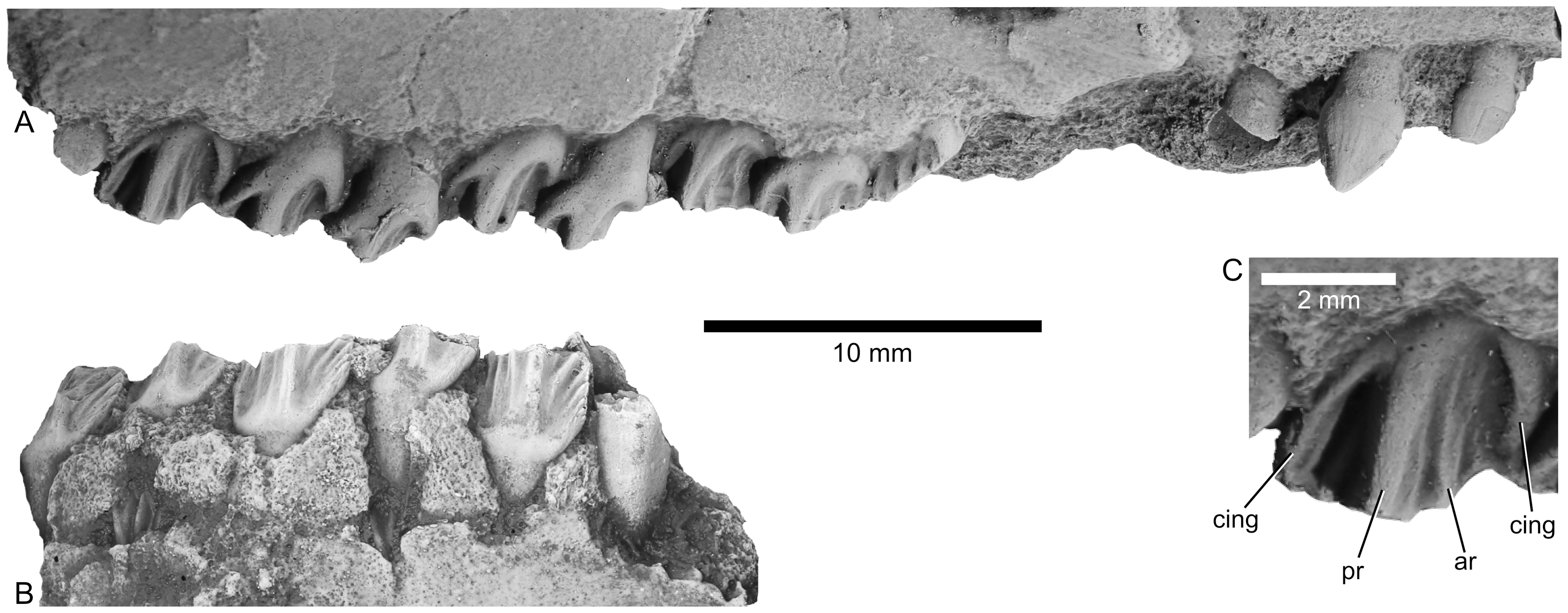
Lower jaw from the sides, above and below (upper left), occlusal surface of the seventh maxillary tooth (upper right), and close-ups of dentition (below)

The postorbital bone (part of the skull roof) is longer than it is tall and wide, and does not form part of the margin of the infratemporal fenestra as in other ceratopsians outside Coronosauria. There is no visible scar from the epijugal (a horn-like structure on the jugal bone), indicating the animal did not have such an ossification, as is also the case for non-neoceratopsians and juvenile coronosaurs. The hind margin of the jugal has light neurovascular impressions rather than the more heavily sculptured surface of most other ceratopsians, and may be a juvenile feature, as it is in ceratopsids.

The predentary bone tapers to a sharp point, in contrast to the blunt U-shape in psittacosaurids and Liaoceratops, but like other neoceratopsians. The cutting surface grades smoothly into the upper midline of the bone, where it is shallowly scooped, like in basal (earlier diverging) neoceratopsians but in contrast to the deep cavity on the midline of coronosaurs. The upper margin of the predentary is blunt in Aquilops like in other neoceratopsians, whereas it is sharp and ridge-like in more basal ceratopsians. The left and right surfaces of the predentary contact each other below along a rounded keel, unlike the broadly oval shape of more basal ceratopsians. When seen from above, the tooth row of the dentary is concave to the outer side, and is greatly inset. The tooth row extends forward to the suture with the predentary, so that there was a minimal diastema (gap) at this end, typical of basal ceratopsians but unlike ceratopsids.

=== Dentition ===
3D scans of the holotype cranium (above) and lower jaws (below); click thumbnails to rotate the models

There are three teeth in the premaxilla of Aquilops, nine in the maxilla, and there would have been at least 12 in the dentary. The three teeth in the premaxilla are directed vertically, and the frontmost tooth is much smaller than the two behind it. Seen from the outward side, these teeth are roughly teardrop-shaped, broadest at the base of the tooth crown, and gently taper towards the tip. The base of each premaxillary tooth crown is elongated from front to back, and the front and back edges of the crowns are marked by carinae (cutting edges). The crowns lack denticles (serrations), unlike Archaeoceratops, Liaoceratops, and Yamaceratops, and both their outward and inward surfaces bear tooth enamel. The frontmost right premaxillary tooth is slightly rounded at its tip, suggesting a wear facet, though this may be because it had recently erupted.

The right maxilla contains nine densely packed teeth, separated from those of the premaxilla by a 6 mm wide diastema. The teeth positioned at the middle of the maxillary row are largest, and seen from the outer side, each tooth crown tapers towards its tip and is egg-shaped. The outward surface of each crown is divided by a broad ridge running towards the tip, with further, less pronounced ridges next to it, as seen in Archaeoceratops and Auroraceratops, and the main ridge merges with the pronounced cingulum at the base of each tooth. At least three "waves" of newly erupted teeth (or Zahnreihen) are preserved in the maxilla, moving from back to front. There are at least three denticles on each of the occlusal edges (where the teeth contacted each other when biting) of their unworn crowns. Three or four "cusps" are present on worn teeth, which are the occlusal part of the ridges on the outward sides. Only the inward side of the maxillary tooth crowns bear enamel, and their wear surfaces are angled to the side from the base to the tip.

The left dentary preserves twelve incomplete, closely packed teeth. The major ridge on the inward surface of each tooth crown here is placed at the middle and is more weakly developed than in the maxillary teeth. The weaker ridges on the sides end in fine denticles, and the cingula here are much less developed than in the maxillary teeth. Only the inward side of the dentary tooth crowns bears enamel. There are visible replacement teeth at two places under the functional teeth. The teeth at the front of the dentary appear to be smaller than those at the back. Dentary teeth greatly exceeding the number of maxillary teeth is a feature shared with Liaoceratops, while it is more equal in other basal neoceratopsians.

== Classification ==
Life restoration with hypothetical body

The timing of dispersal and affinities of North American neoceratopsians from the Early Cretaceous were poorly understood prior to the description of Aquilops. Farke and colleagues performed a cladistic analysis (a study of the evolutionary relationships of organisms) in 2014 that found Aquilops to be a basal member of Neoceratopsia surrounded by Asian taxa, and outside of the Leptoceratopsidae-Coronosauria group. Only Liaoceratops from China was more basal within Neoceratopsia, and Aquilops was itself basal to a clade containing Auroraceratops from China and Yamaceratops from Mongolia. Though the subadult status of the holotype might have distorted these results because juvenile individuals often show basal traits, when these authors took traits that might change during ontogeny into account, the resulting tree was practically the same. They also found this result consistent with the geological age of Aquilops.

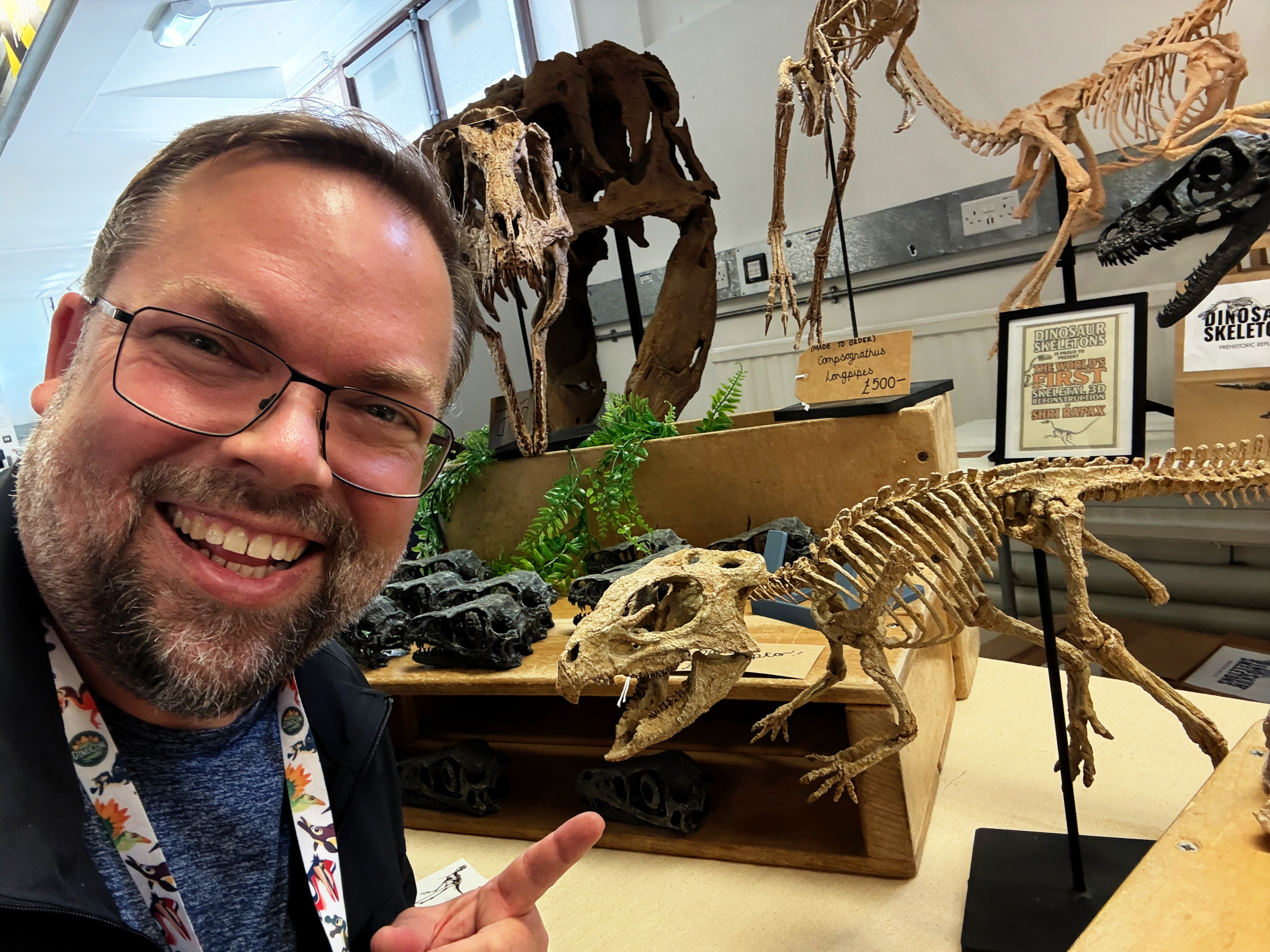
Co-describer Mathew J. Wedel with a reconstructed Aquilops skeleton at DinoCon

To evaluate the paleobiogeographical patterns of ceratopsians from North America in relation to Asia and Europe, Farke and colleagues used a likelihood model called the Dispersal-Extinction-Cladogenesis (DEC) model. The model suggested three different migration events of ceratopsians from Asia into North America, with Aquilops and perhaps other poorly documented basal neoceratopsians arriving first at the Early–Late Cretaceous boundary, followed by most leptoceratopsids and lastly ceratopsoids. These authors noted that while other remains from North America thought to belong to basal neoceratopsians, such as teeth from the early Albian Arundel Formation of Maryland and early Cenomanian Cedar Mountain Formation of Utah, and a partial skeleton lacking a skull from the Albian Wayan Formation of Idaho, their placement within the group was uncertain, with Aquilops permitting much more detailed reconstruction of biogeographical scenarios.

Farke and colleagues found it surprising that Aquilops was most closely related to Asian taxa and not to later North American ceratopsians, and noted the timing of these dispersals was uncertain, an issue made difficult by the patchy fossil record of the mid-Cretaceous. There is evidence of faunal interchange of other dinosaur clades during the Early Cretaceous as well, indicating that there were periodic connections between these two continents until the Turonian, whereafter there was an interval of isolation followed by reconnection, perhaps during the Campanian. Neoceratopsians may have dispersed from one landmass to another through Beringia or via Europe, but these authors cautioned that more fieldwork was needed to clarify the time and space.

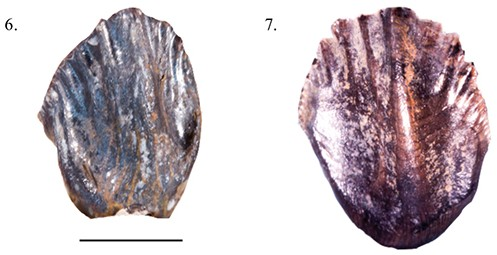
These teeth from the Arundel Formation belonged to a neoceratopsian similar to but older than Aquilops

A 2016 study by the paleontologist Fenglu Han and colleagues found Aquilops in a similar basal position, but in a polytomy (unresolved relationship) with Auroraceratops and Archaeoceratops. In 2018, the paleontologist Chase Brownstein stated that the neoceratopsian teeth from the Arundel Formation had been dated to the Aptian stage of the Early Cretaceous, and were therefore older than the Albian Aquilops. This supported the supposed interchange of neoceratopsians between North America and Asia during the Aptian, and the idea that the group had dispersed into North America by then. He suggested that the owner of the Arundel teeth would have been part of this dispersal, and probably belonged to an animal similar to Aquilops.

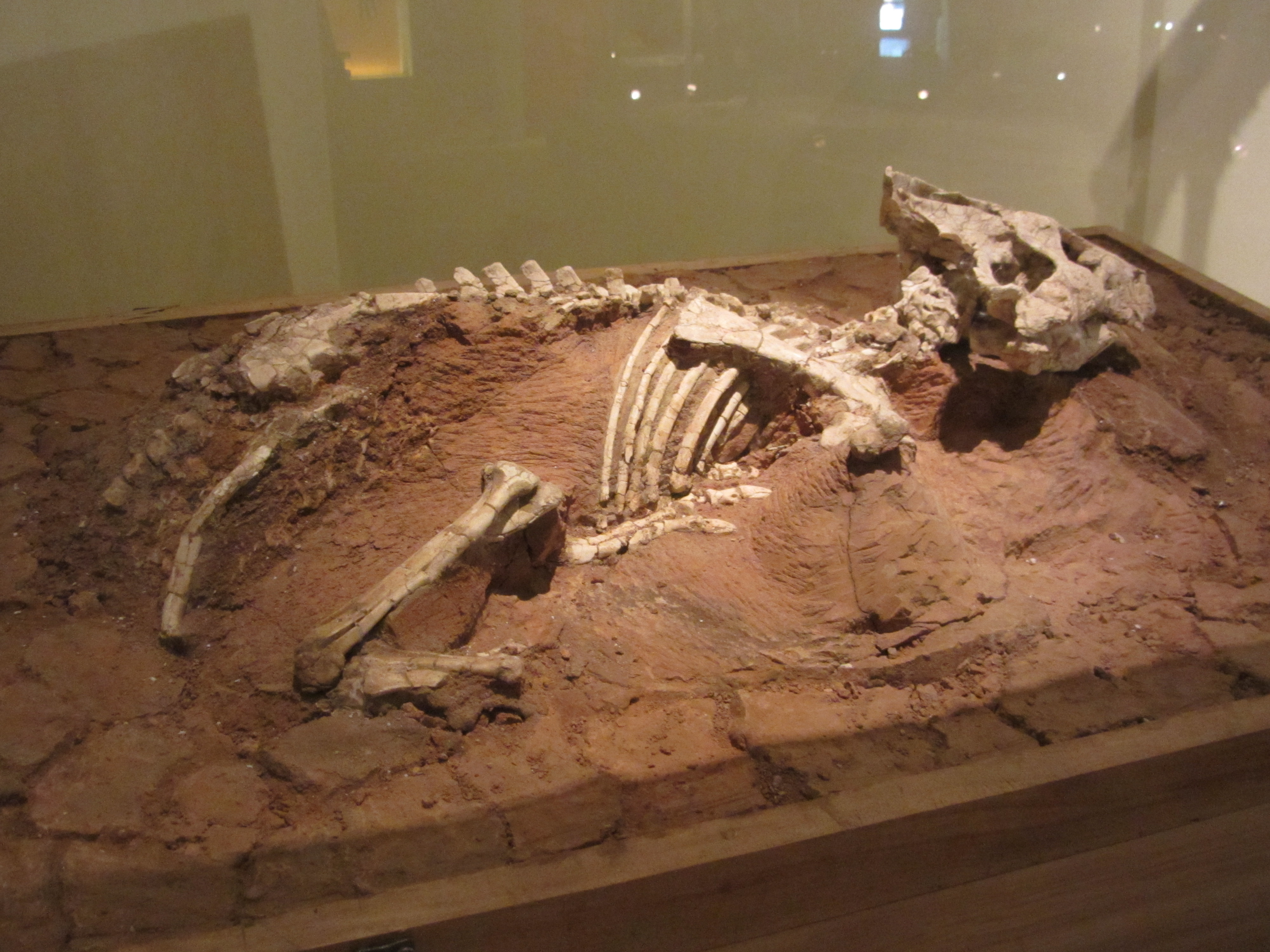
Fossil of Auroraceratops from China, which has been found to be closely related to Aquilops by several studies

In 2018, the analysis of American scientist Eric M. Morschhauser and colleagues found Aquilops in a polytomy with Auroraceratops and an unnamed Mongolian neoceratopsian (catalogued as specimen ZPAL MgD 1156). However, another analysis in the same paper found Aquilops at the base of a clade containing it, ZPAL MgD 1156, and Auroraceratops, and the authors noted their interrelationships had changed slightly in previous studies. In both Aquilops and Auroraceratops, the jugal is wider than deep below the orbit. These authors agreed with the ideas of Farke and colleagues about biogeography. The Korean paleontologist Minyoung Son and colleagues reached a similar result in 2022, though Aquilops was found to be more derived (later diverging) than Auroraceratops and basal to Yamaceratops.

A 2024 paper by Japanese paleontologist Tomonori Tanaka and colleagues found Aquilops to be the sister taxon of Sasayamagnomus from Japan, the two sharing features such as having a concave lower border of the premaxilla and in that the suture between the frontal and postorbital was vertically oriented. These authors suggested that they may have formed a group of trans-Pacific basal neoceratopsians that diverged from each other during the latest Aptian to the Aptian-Albian border. This would be part of an occasion that has been termed the Early Cretaceous Laurasian interchange event, when taxa with Asian affinities entered North America, and would be consistent with the time when the Bering land bridge connected the two continents. The cladogram below shows the placement of Aquilops within Ceratopsia according to Tanaka and colleagues.

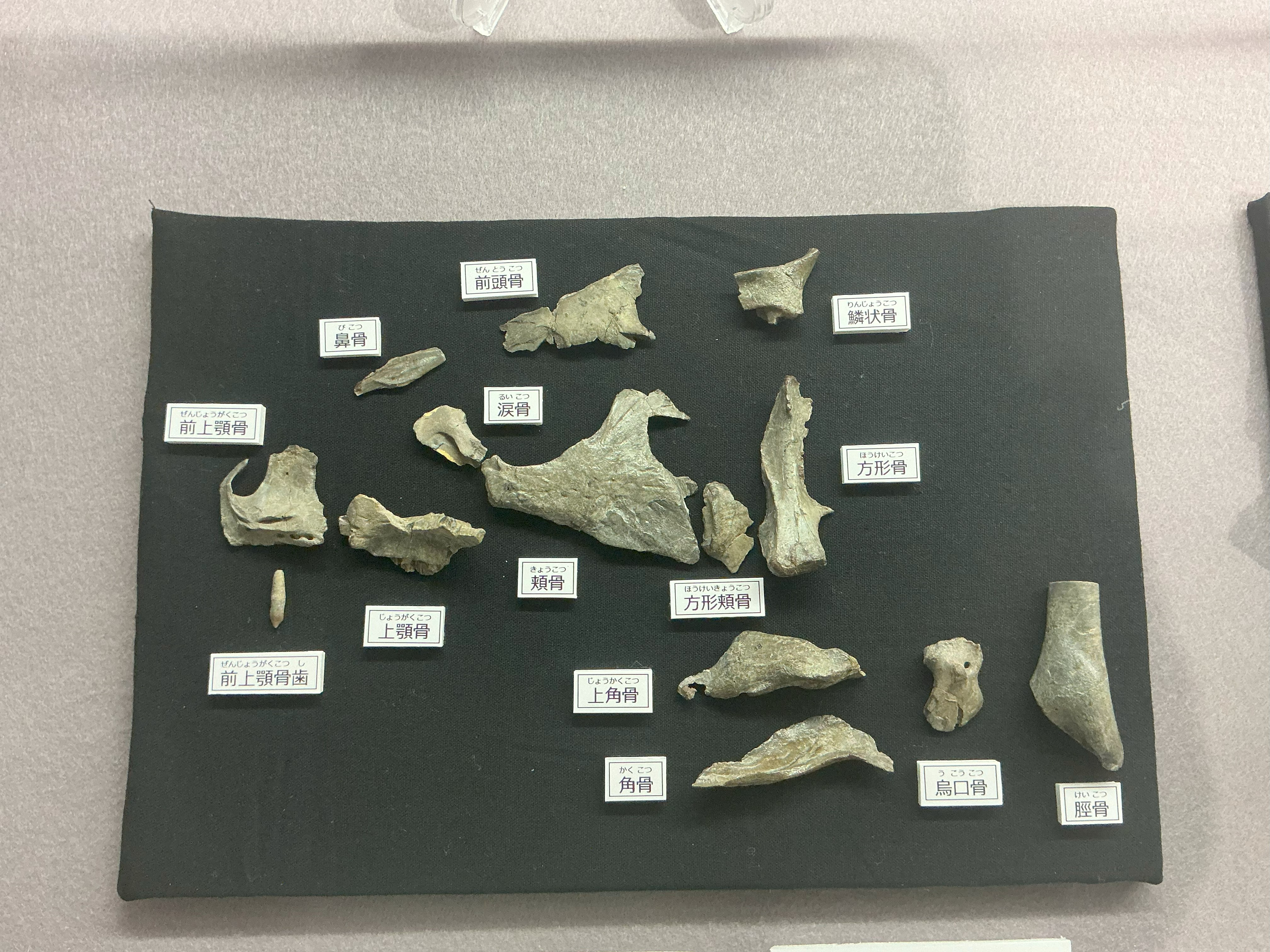
Holotype skull of Sasayamagnomus, the probable sister taxon of Aquilops from Japan

- Ceratopsia
  - Psittacosaurus
  - Chaoyangsauridae
  - Neoceratopsia
    - Stenopelix
    - Liaoceratops
    - - Mosaiceratops
      - Asiaceratops
      - - Archaeoceratops
        - - - Auroraceratops
            - - Aquilops
              - Sasayamagnomus
          - - Koreaceratops
            - Helioceratops
            - 'Graciliceratops'
            - Yamaceratops
            - Leptoceratopsidae
            - Coronosauria
              - Protoceratopsidae
              - - Ajkaceratops
                - Ceratopsoidea

== Paleobiology ==
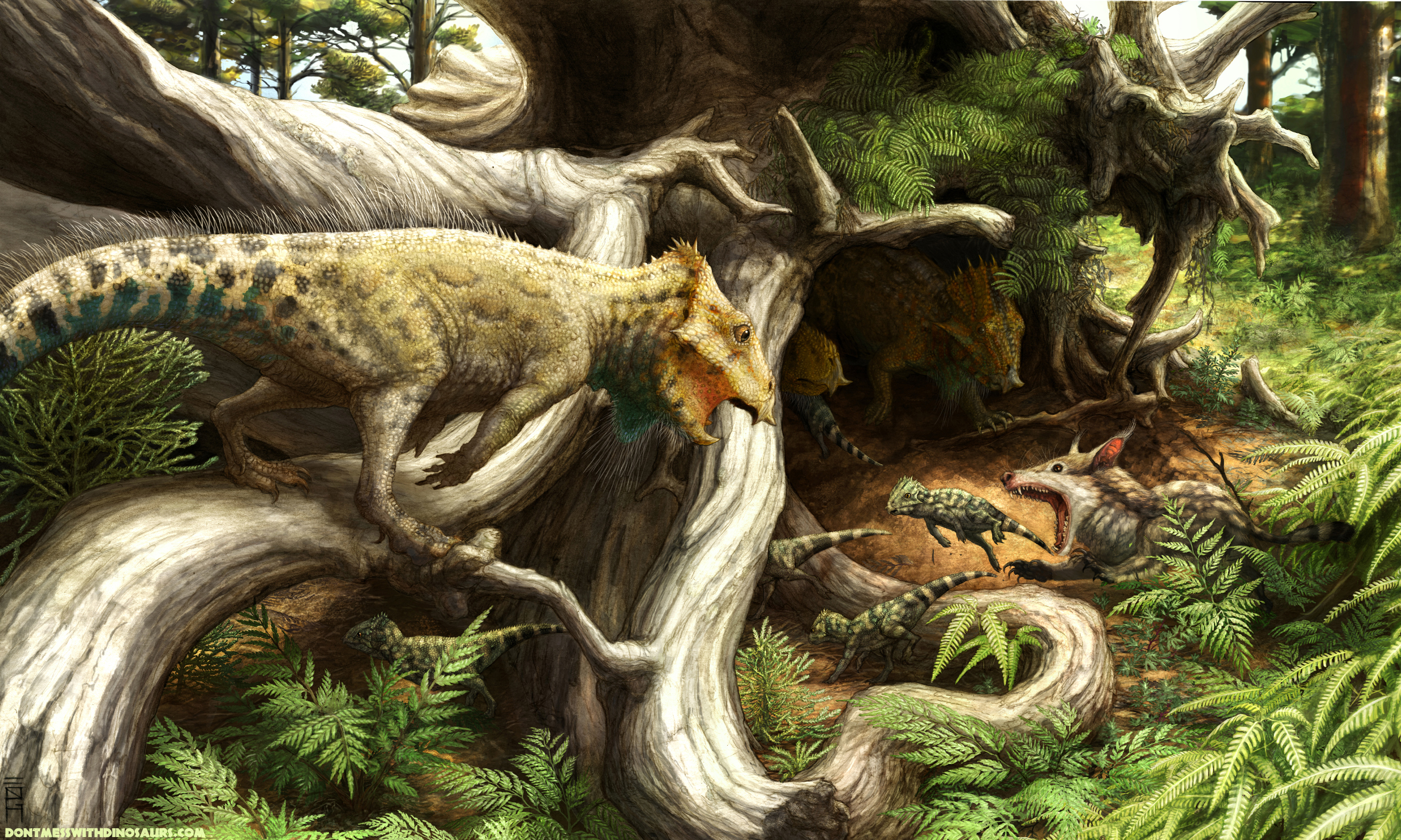
Restoration of Cloverly formation environment with the mammal Gobiconodon pursuing juvenile Aquilops while adults attempt to protect them

Farke stated Aquilops would have been a plant-eater, using its hooked beak to nip at vegetation. In an overview of the group, the paleontologist Thomas R. Holtz Jr. explained that the neck frills of basal neoceratopsians probably evolved to increase the size of their jaw muscles. Dinosaurs had a set of jaw muscles passing inside the skull and attaching to the supratemporal fenestra (an opening on the upper back of the skull). Basal neoceratopsians expanded the area of this opening, which provided a bigger area for muscle attachment, giving them stronger jaws and bites. The shearing surfaces on the teeth of neoceratopsians gave them a very strong, sharp bite, which, though some researchers have suggested they could have been used to eat some meat, were probably for slicing tough plants.

The relatively small heads and slender arms of basal neoceratopsians mean that they probably spent some time walking only on their hind legs, whereas more derived neoceratopsians probably walked on all fours due to their much larger heads. More basal ceratopsians, like Psittacosaurus and Chaoyangsauridae, had a small shelf at the back of the head, while the larger neck frills of derived neoceratopsians were probably used for display behavior, and only more advanced ceratopsids had horns.

== Paleoenvironment ==
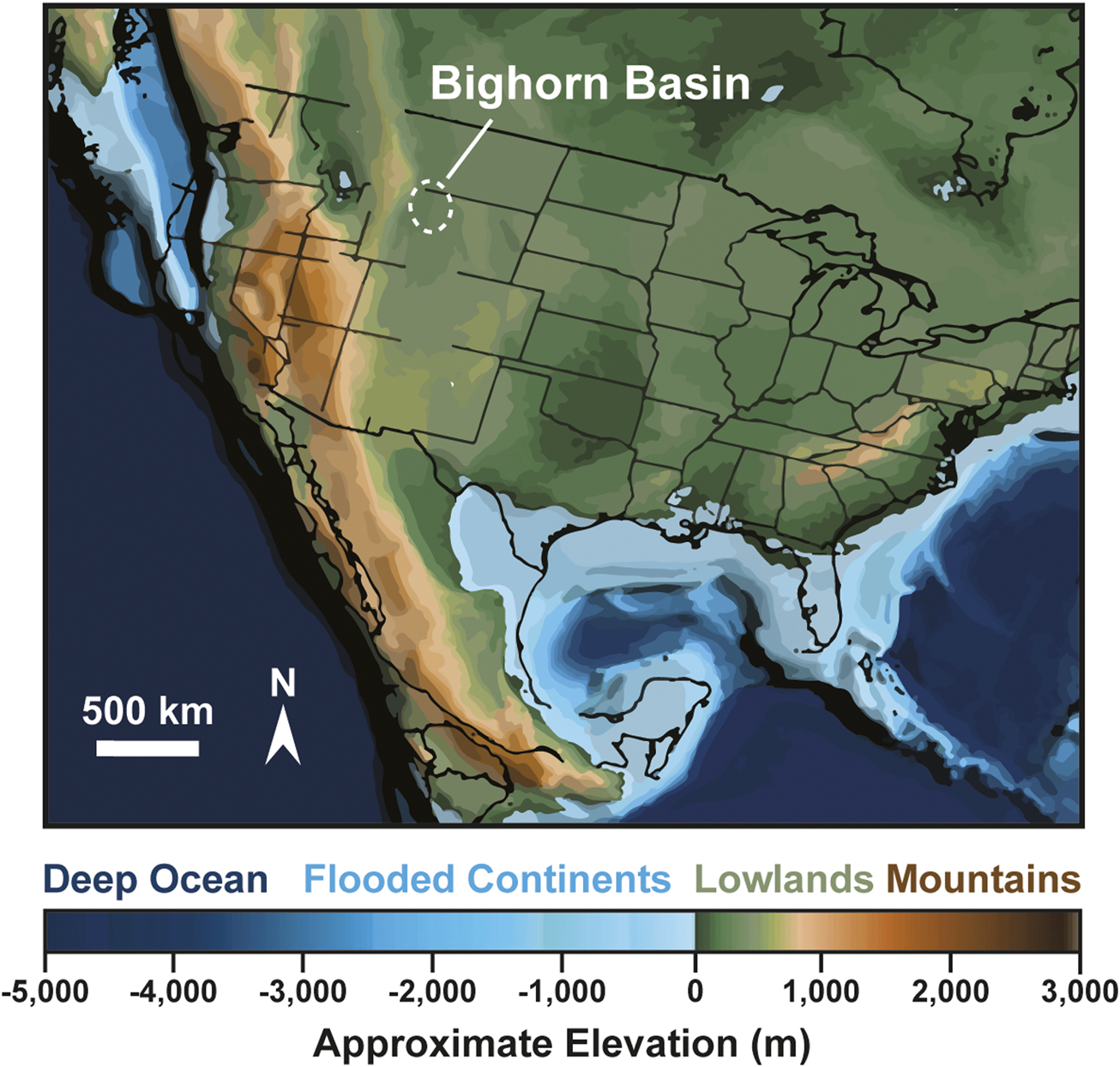
Map of North America during the mid Albian, around the time Aquilops lived. The Bighorn Basin where its fossils are known is marked in white.

Aquilops was found in rocks assigned to Unit VII, also known as the Himes Member, of the Cloverly Formation in what is now Montana. The Himes Member is a distinct layer of brightly colored red, maroon, and orange sandstones and is the uppermost section of the formation. Deposits of the Cloverly Formation range from central Wyoming into central Montana, largely within the Bighorn Basin. Many of these deposits overlay the Jurassic-aged Morrison Formation. The age of the Himes Member is debated. Farke and colleagues noted the uncertainty in 2014, but dated Aquilops to the middle to early late Albian ages of the Cretaceous, about 109–104 million years ago. A 2019 study by American paleontologist Michael D'Emic and colleagues revised the chronostratigraphy of the formation, estimating the age to be between 109–98 million years ago. This would date the Himes Member to the mid–late Albian to early Cenomanian ages of the Cretaceous.

Beginning in the Late Cretaceous, North America was bisected into two major landmasses, Laramidia in the West, and Appalachia in the East, by the Western Interior Seaway, though during the Albian this Seaway had not fully divided the continent. The environment of the Cloverly Formation is poorly understood, largely on account of its faunal composition. Potentially marine fish, such as pycnodonts, existed alongside freshwater animals, like amphibians. The water was warm, with a hot-season surface temperature of about 26 degrees Celsius (79 degrees Fahrenheit), while the air was about 24 degrees Celsius (75 degrees Fahrenheit). During the Albian, much of North America was blanketed by vast forests composed of diverse plant life. The canopy was dominated by conifers such as pines, redwoods, and araucarians, ginkgos, flowering trees like planes (sycamores), magnoliales, laurales, fabids, and malvids. The forest floor supported a rich understory of ferns, palms, cycads, cycadeoids, and horsetails. More open areas would have been home to the fern Ruffordia.

=== Fauna ===
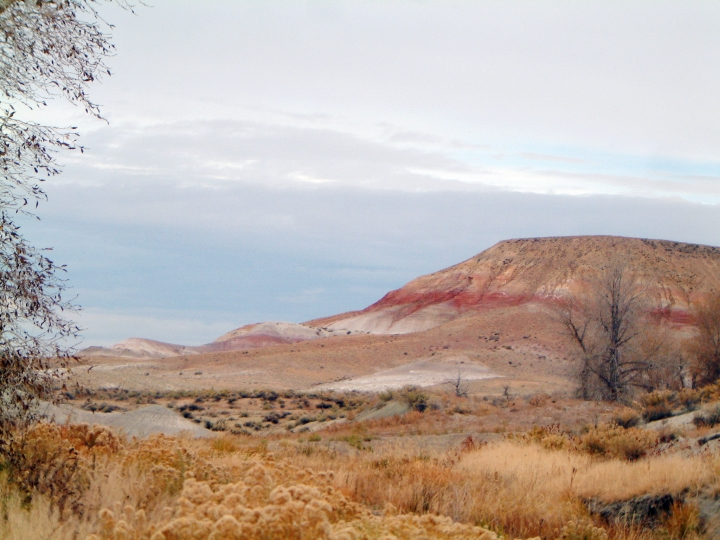
An outcrop of the Cloverly Formation, with the Himes Member at the top in red sandstone.

The Cloverly Formation represents an upland ecosystem. Mudstones make up the lower members of the formation, which were likely deposited by lakes or an alluvial plain. In contrast, the Himes Member is a conglomerate and sandstone formation, which was a braided river system during the Cretaceous. These rivers were energetic and flowed alongside low-energy, seasonal lakes. In these water bodies lived an array of fish, such as the lungfish Ceratodus, semionotid Lepidotes, and the shark Hybodus, amphibians, including the salamander-like Albanerpeton, turtles, like Naomichelys and Glyptops, and crocodyliforms are represented by indeterminate bernissartids, atoposaurids, and goniopholidids. Microvertebrate fossils are found in the seasonal lacustrine sections, while macrovertebrate remains are often discovered in the river flow deposits. The presence of turtles, lungfish, and crocodilians suggests that the Cloverly had a warm climate year-round. Mammals and squamates (snakes and lizards) are the rarest animals known from the formation, the former represented by genera like the gobiconodontid Gobiconodon, the multituberculate Paracimexomys, and the marsupial Atokatheridium, while squamates like the paramacellodid Paramacellodus and teiid Ptilotodon have been found. The faunal makeup of the Cloverly, Antlers, and Cedar Mountain Formations are very similar, with several genera represented in all three.

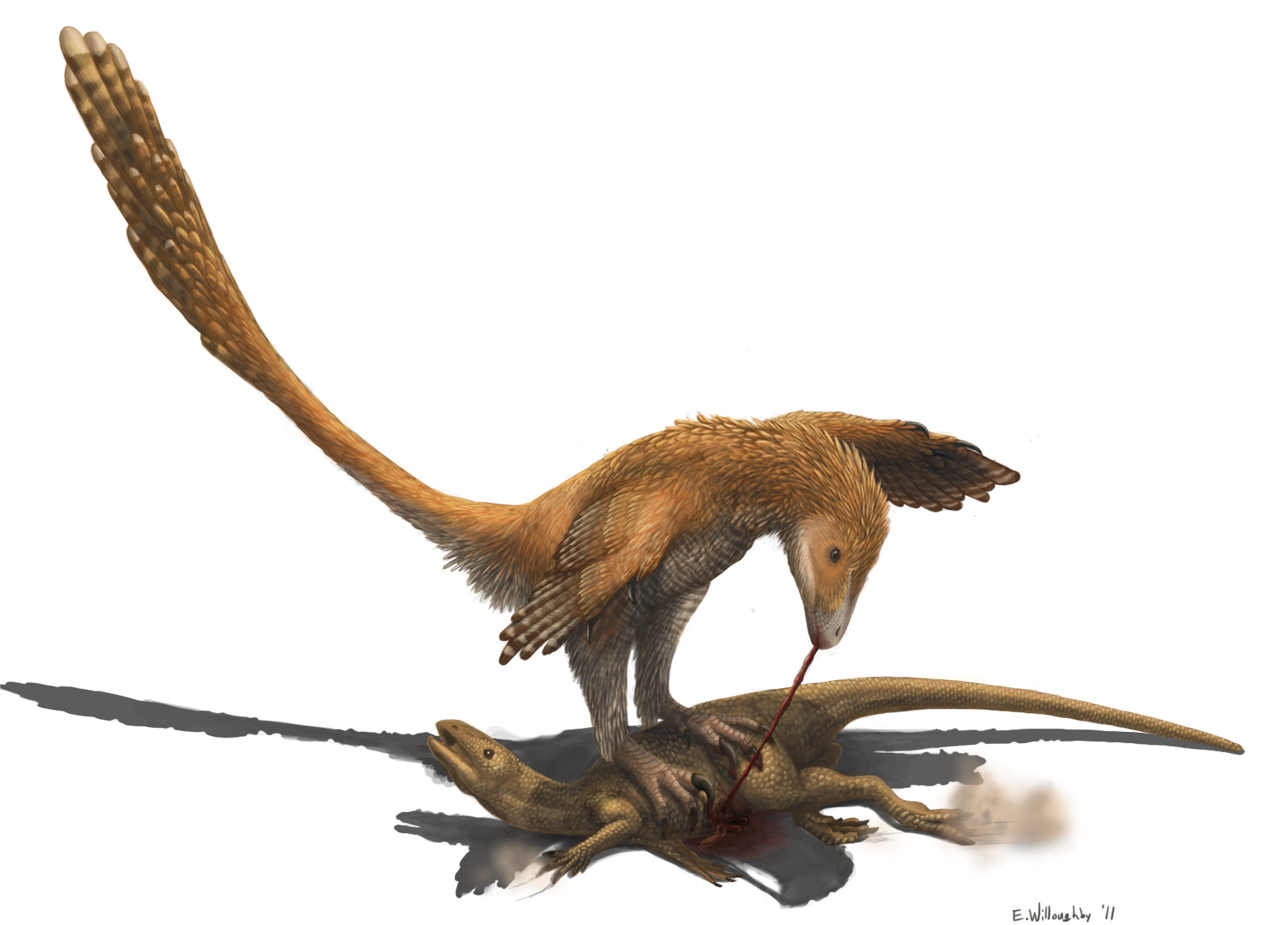
Life restoration of the contemporaneous Deinonychus preying on Zephyrosaurus

Dinosaurs are the most diverse group in the Cloverly Formation, constituting about a quarter of its total vertebrate diversity. The large iguanodont Tenontosaurus is represented by about 80 specimens and is the most commonly known dinosaur in the formation. Other ornithischians known from the formation include the thescelosaurid Zephyrosaurus and the armored nodosaurid ankylosaurs Sauropelta and Tatankacephalus. The largest dinosaur known from the area is the sauropod Sauroposeidon, and the sauropod Rugocaudia is also known from there. Theropods of various sizes and groups are represented, such as the carcharodontosaurid Acrocanthosaurus, an apex predator, the dromaeosaur Deinonychus, which preyed on Tenontosaurus, the oviraptorosaur Microvenator, and an indeterminate ornithomimid. Other dinosaurs from the Cloverly Formation have been reported from the Arundel Formation as well, such as Acrocanthosaurus, Deinonychus, and Tenontosaurus, implying that there was a cross-continental distribution of these genera. However, sauropod and ankylosaur fossils are much more common in Appalachian fossil formations than Laramidian ones, suggesting that they had different faunal compositions.

== See also ==
- 2014 in paleontology
- Timeline of ceratopsian research
