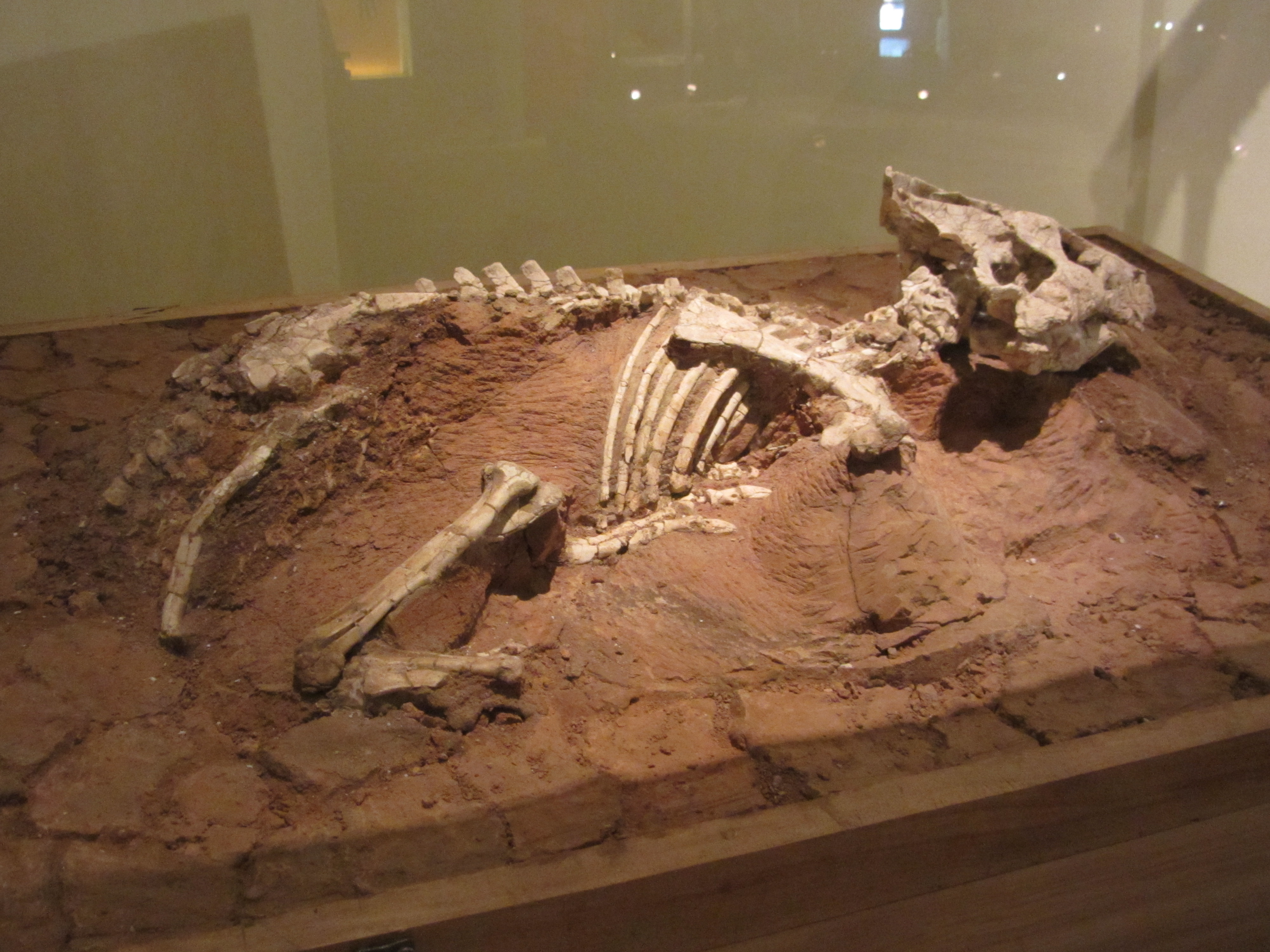
- Partially prepared specimen of A. rugosus, GSGM GJ <07> 9-38

Scientific classification
- Kingdom: Animalia
- Phylum: Chordata
- Class: Reptilia
- Clade: Dinosauria
- Clade: †Ornithischia
- Clade: †Ceratopsia
- Clade: †Neoceratopsia
- Genus: †Auroraceratops; You et al., 2005
- Species: †A. rugosus

Binomial name
- †Auroraceratops rugosus You et al., 2005

= Auroraceratops =

Auroraceratops Temporal range: Early Cretaceous, Albian

Extinct genus of dinosaurs

Auroraceratops, meaning "dawn horned face", is a genus of bipedal basal neoceratopsian dinosaur, from the Early Cretaceous (Aptian age) of north central China. The etymology of the generic name refers to its status as an early ceratopsian and also to Dawn Dodson, wife of Peter Dodson, one of the palaeontologists who described it.

== Discovery and species ==
Expeditions into the Gansu Province of northwestern China began with the Sino-Swedish Expedition of 1930 to 1931, where discoveries of dinosaurs including the now-dubious early ceratopsian Microceratops sulcidens. These discoveries were followed by occasional observations of dinosaur bones in the Houhongquan Basin in the 1960s, and then the Gongpoquan Basin in 1986. Such observations led to the China-Canada Dinosaur Project taking a reconnaissance trip to the Gongpoquan Basin in 1988, but no further expeditions were led until the Sino-Japanese Silk Road Dinosaur Expedition of 1992 and 1993, led by Chinese paleontology Dong Zhiming of the Institute of Vertebrate Paleontology and Paleoanthropology (IVPP) and Japanese paleontologst Yoichi Azuma of the Fukui Prefectural Dinosaur Museum (FPDM). The Sino-Japanese Dinosaur Project discovered the new early ceratopsian Archaeoceratops, based on a skull and two partial skeletons, as well as many of the unique genera that form the Mazongshan Dinosaur Fauna of the Early Cretaceous of Gansu. Collaborations on the paleontology of the Mazongshan area continued with the Sino-American Mazongshan Dinosaur Project of 1997 to 2000, where the University of Pennsylvania, Carnegie Museum of Natural History and the IVPP collaborated. The Sino-American Dinosaur Project noticed the Yujingzi Basin in 1999 as a potential dinosaur-bearing locality, with the first dinosaur fossils discovered in 2000 by team members including Chinese paleontologist You Hailu of the Institute of Geology of Chinese Academy of Geological Sciences (CAGS). You began collaborations with Chinese paleontologist Li Daqing of the Fossil Research and Development Center (FRDC) of Gansu Province in 2004, beginning excavations in the Yujingzi Basin and continuing those in the Gongpoquan Basin.

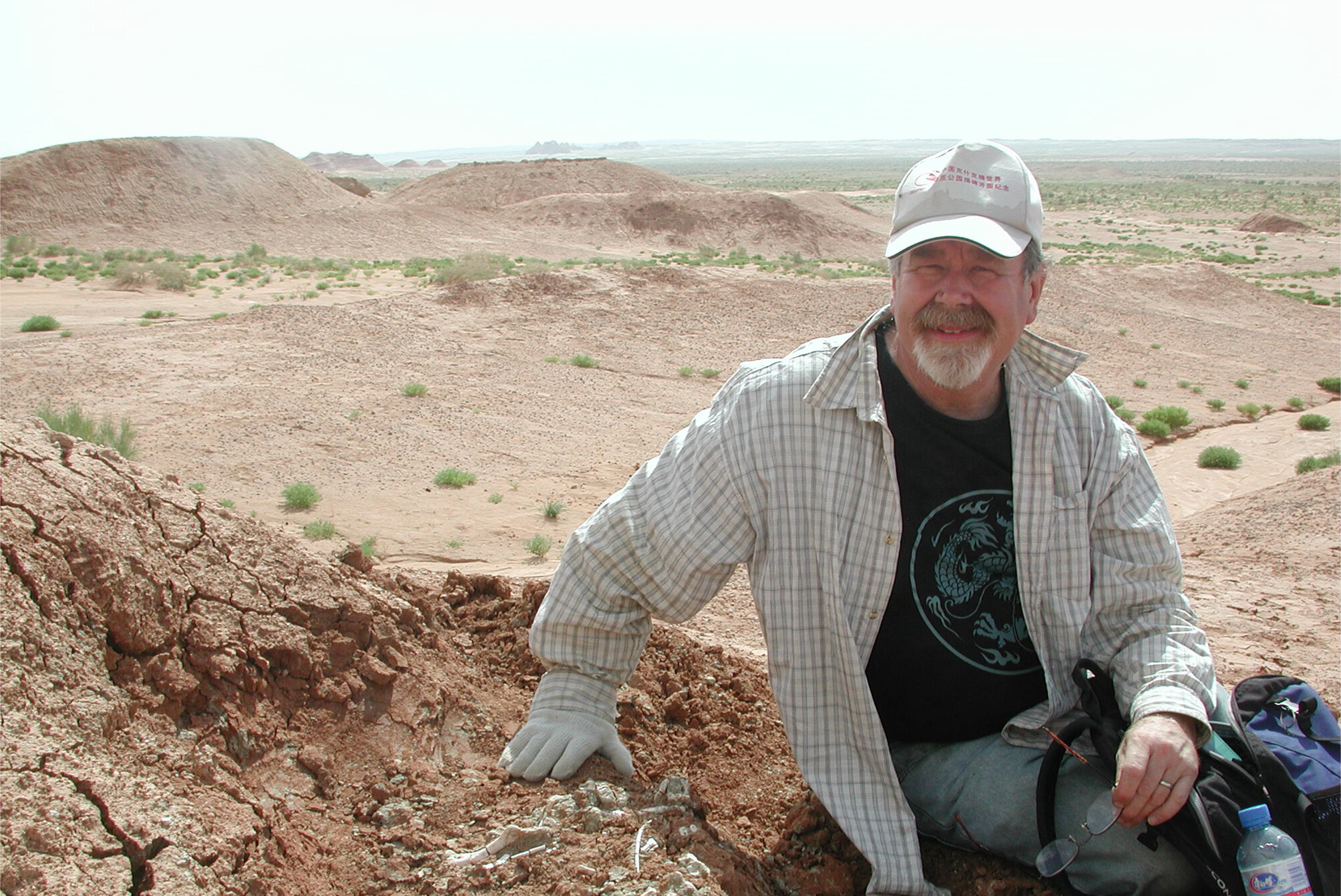
Peter Dodson examining a specimen of Auroraceratops

A well-preserved skull of an early ceratopsian was recovered in 2004 by fieldwork of the FRDC in the Gongpoquan Basin, and accessioned as CAGS IG-2004-VD-001. Due to the differences in anatomy from the earlier-found Archaeoceratops, You and colleagues chose to name the new binomial Auroraceratops rugosus for the specimen in 2005, making CAGS IG-2004-VD-001 the holotype of their new taxon. The generic name is derived from a double-entendre of the Latin word aurora, 'dawn', referencing both the taxon's status as an early ceratopsian as well as Dawn Dodson, wife of co-author Peter Dodson who was also a committee member of You's dissertation. The species name rugosus refers to the rugose texturing of the skull and jaws.

Explorations in the red beds in the north of Yujingzi Basin in 2006 and 2007 by the Field Museum of Natural History, American Museum of Natural History, and FDRC discovered a graveyard of Auroraceratops specimens. A series of at least 50 well-preserved specimens of Auroraceratops were recovered in the late summer of 2007, and excavations in subsequent seasons by the FDRC, Gansu Geological Museum (GGM) and University of Pennsylvania among other institutions brought the count of individuals of Auroraceratops to 80 by the end of the 2010 field season. One specimen from this area, GGM-FV-00500, was described in 2012 by You and colleagues, who considered it to represent a new species of Auroraceratops, but lacked data to justify giving it a name. This specimen, along with the others found in Yujingzi Basin, we reassessed as belonging to A. rugosus by You, American paleontologist Eric M. Morschhauser, and colleagues in 2019. All specimens of Auroraceratops from the Yujingzi Basin are closely associated to fully articulated, with varying levels of completeness. Most specimens, which were recovered in individual plaster jackets, consist of a single individual, though some include several associated individuals.

The Early Cretaceous deposits of the Yujingzi Basin are from Xinminpu Group, with three distinct facies, of which only the upper red sandstone preserves Auroraceratops. Carbon isotopes from the Yujingzi Basin sediments show sediments of the area are correlated to the ocean anoxic event named the Paquier Event, spanning the late Albian to early Aptian. Radiometric dating of the Xiagou Formation and Zhonggou Formation elsewhere allows the sediments of the Yujingzi Basin to be identified, with the lower gray to green-gray mudstones and siltstones being the Xiagou Formation, while the red sandstones are the base of the Zhonggou. Auroraceratops can be placed in the lower Albian in the Yujingzi Basin through these correlations. In the Gongpoquan Basin, Auroraceratops is only found in the red beds as well, though the gray beds are younger in this location. Using Auroraceratops and its associated fauna for biostratigraphy, all the deposits of the Gongpoquan Basin are from the Zhonggou Formation, where the red beds are the oldest.

== Description ==
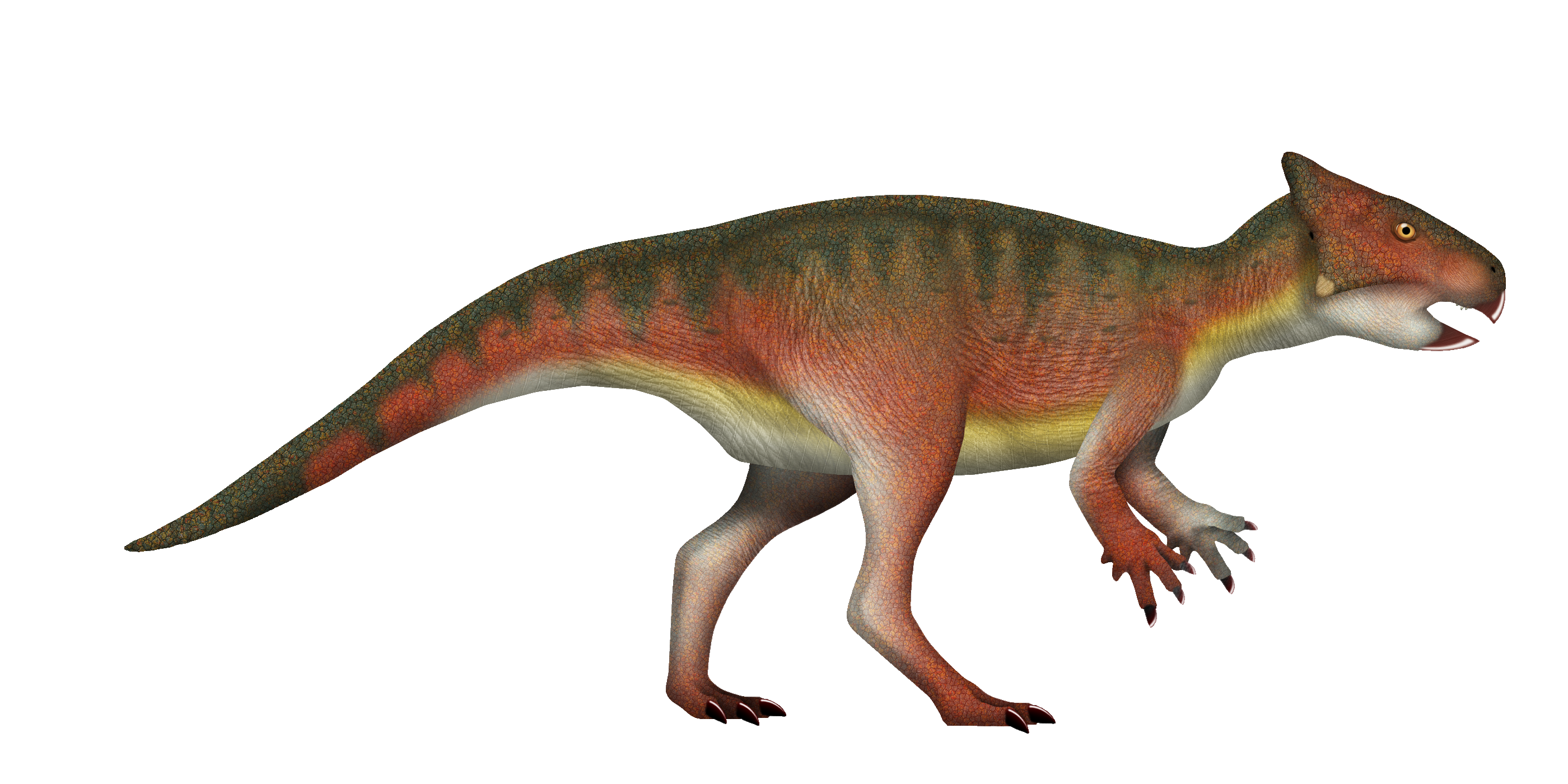
Life reconstruction of Auroraceratops

Though most other neoceratopsians are characterized by a long, narrow snout, Auroraceratops has a shorter wider one. The 20 cm (8 in) skull itself is rather flat and wide. The premaxillae have at least two pairs of striated fang-like teeth. Paired rugose areas, very probably covered in keratin in life, are in front of the eyes and on the jugal with corresponding areas on the lower jaw. Some specimens show a variation in skull morphology, possibly representing intra-specific variation or sexual dimorphism, though taphonomy might also be the reason. The bone beds of articulated Auroraceratops specimens (1869 skeletal elements from 74 individuals) indicate that these individuals died by rapid burial inside burrows based on its preservation in a curled up position and lack of bone weathering.

Auroraceratops is a rather derived moderate-sized basal neoceratopsian that adds diversity to that clade, displaying skull features not present in Archaeoceratops or Liaoceratops, such as the external naris being round in Auroraceratops but elliptical in the other two genera. A detailed analysis of the post-cranial skeleton published in 2019 showed that the animal would have walked bipedally and had an estimated length of 1.25 m (4.1 ft), hip height of 44 cm (17 in) and body mass of 15.5 kg (34 lb).

== Paleoecology ==
Auroraceratops is a key component of the Mazongshan Dinosaur Fauna of the Early Cretaceous Xinminbao Group. The Mazongshan Dinosaur Fauna is distributed between the Gongpoquan and Yujingzi basins of Gansu Province, with Auroraceratops found in both main areas. The age of the Mazongshan Dinosaur Fauna is from the mid-Aptian to the early Albian, distributed between the Xiagou and Zhonggou Formations. There are 11 dinosaur genera from the MDF, with none found in any other location, excluding the dubious genera first named by Birger Bohlin after being discovered during the Sino-Swedish Expedition. Theropods are represented by the tyrannosauroid Xiongguanlong, the ornithomimosaur Beishanlong and the therizinosaur Suzhousaurus. Additional ornithomimosaur specimens belonging to Beishanlong and a new unnamed taxon are known, and the uncertain therizinosaur "Nanshiungosaurus" bohlini is also known. There are two sauropods known from the MDF, the somphospondylans Gobititan and Qiaowanlong, the latter of which was originally thought to be a brachiosaurid. Four early hadrosauroids are known, Equijubus, Gongpoquansaurus, Xuwulong and Jintasaurus. Auroraceratops is one of two genera of neoceratopsians known, the other being Archaeoceratops represented by both species A. oshimai and A. yujingziensis. Auroraceratops is only known from the red-colored beds that form the bottom of the Zhonggou Formation, where it has been found alongside Archaeoceratops oshimai, Beishanlong and the unnamed ornithomimosaur, and Suzhousaurus and "N." bohlini. Sedimentary features indicate that Auroraceratops lived in a seasonally arid environment.

== See also ==
- Timeline of ceratopsian research
