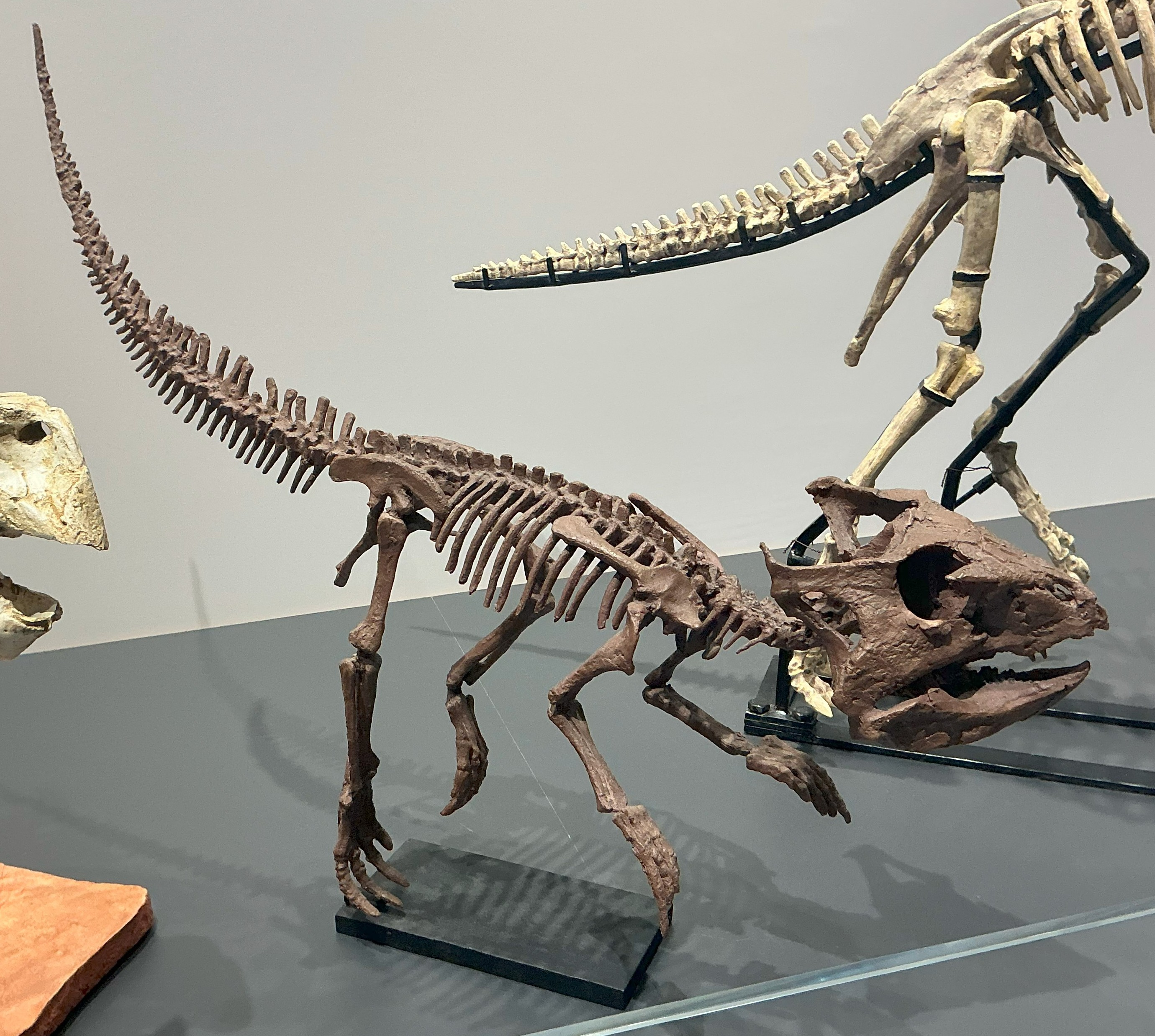
- Skeletal mount, Tamba Dinosaur Museum

Scientific classification
- Kingdom: Animalia
- Phylum: Chordata
- Class: Reptilia
- Clade: Dinosauria
- Clade: †Ornithischia
- Clade: †Ceratopsia
- Clade: †Neoceratopsia
- Family: †Archaeoceratopsidae
- Genus: †Archaeoceratops; Dong & Azuma, 1997

Species
- †A. oshimai Dong & Azuma, 1997 (type); †A. yujingziensis You et al., 2010

= Archaeoceratops =

Archaeoceratops Temporal range: Early Cretaceous, 125 Ma

Extinct genus of dinosaurs

Archaeoceratops, meaning "ancient horned face", is a genus of basal neoceratopsian dinosaur from the Early Cretaceous (Aptian stage) of north central China. It appears to have been bipedal and quite small, reaching 0.9 m (3.0 ft) in length and 10 kg (22 lb) in body mass. It had a comparatively large head but no horns, possessing only a small bony frill projecting from the back of its head.

== Discovery and species ==
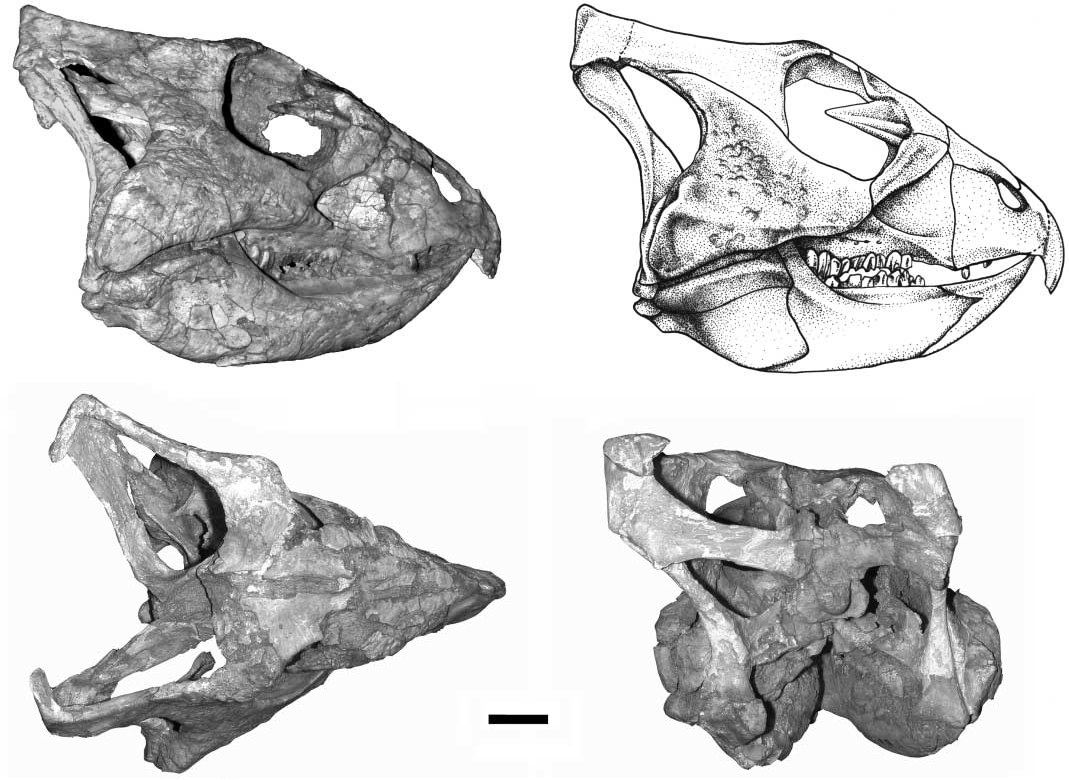
A. oshimai skull

Life reconstruction of A. oshimai

Two specimens were found in the Middle Gray Unit of the Xinminbao Group, Gongpoquan Basin of the Mazong Shan area of Gansu Province, north central China. The type species, A. oshimai, was named by Dong Zhiming and Azuma in 1997. It is the first basal neoceratopsian discovered in this area.

The type specimen, IVPP V11114, consists of a partially complete skeleton including skull, caudal vertebrae, pelvis, and most of a hind foot. The second specimen (paratype), IVPP V11115, consists of an incomplete skeleton with a relatively well preserved caudal series, a partial hind limb, and a completely preserved foot. It is slightly smaller than the holotype.

== Classification ==
Archaeoceratops belonged to the Ceratopsia (the name is Greek for "horned face"), a group of herbivorous dinosaurs with parrot-like beaks which thrived in North America and Asia during the Cretaceous Period. In 1997 Dong and Azuma placed it in a new family, Archaeoceratopsidae. Helioceratops and possibly Yamaceratops have also been found to be members of Archaeoceratopsidae.

== Diet ==
Archaeoceratops, like all ceratopsians, was a herbivore. During the Cretaceous, flowering plants were "geographically limited on the landscape", and so it is likely that this dinosaur fed on the predominant plants of the era: ferns, cycads and conifers. It would have used its sharp beak to bite off the leaves or needles and chop them up to be swallowed.

== See also ==
- Timeline of ceratopsian research

== Sources ==
- Dong, Z.; Azuma, Y. (1997). "On a primitive Neoceratopsian from the early Cretaceous of China". In Dong, Z. (ed.). Sino-Japanese Silk Road dinosaur expedition. China Ocean press. pp. 68–89.
- You, H.; Dodson, P. (2003). "Redescription of neoceratopsian dinosaur Archaeoceratops and early evolution of Neoceratopsia" (PDF). Acta Palaeontologica Polonica. 48 (2): 261–272.
- Archaeoceratops in the Dino Directory
