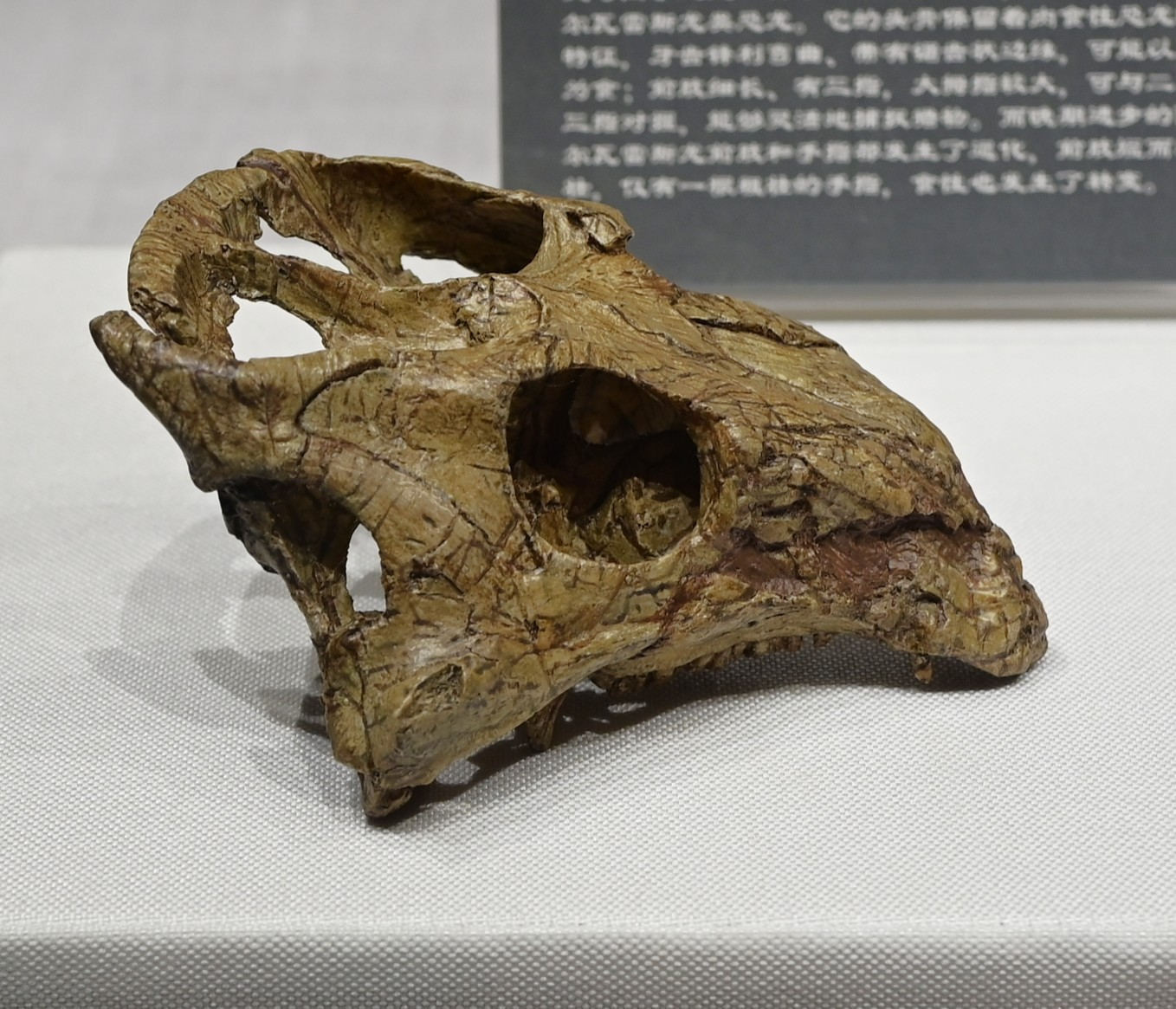
- Skull at the Baoding Natural History Museum

Scientific classification
- Kingdom: Animalia
- Phylum: Chordata
- Class: Reptilia
- Clade: Dinosauria
- Clade: †Ornithischia
- Clade: †Ceratopsia
- Clade: †Neoceratopsia
- Genus: †Liaoceratops; Xu et al., 2002

Type species
- Liaoceratops yanzigouensis Xu et al., 2002

= Liaoceratops =

Liaoceratops Temporal range: Early Cretaceous, 125.75–125.68 Ma

Extinct genus of dinosaurs

Liaoceratops, meaning "Liaoning horned face", is a ceratopsian dinosaur believed to be an early relative of the horned ceratopsids. It lived in the Early Cretaceous, 126 million years ago. It was discovered in China by a team of American and Chinese scientists. Liaoceratops was much smaller than its later relatives, but offers a glimpse into the early evolution of this group of dinosaurs.

== Discoveries and naming ==
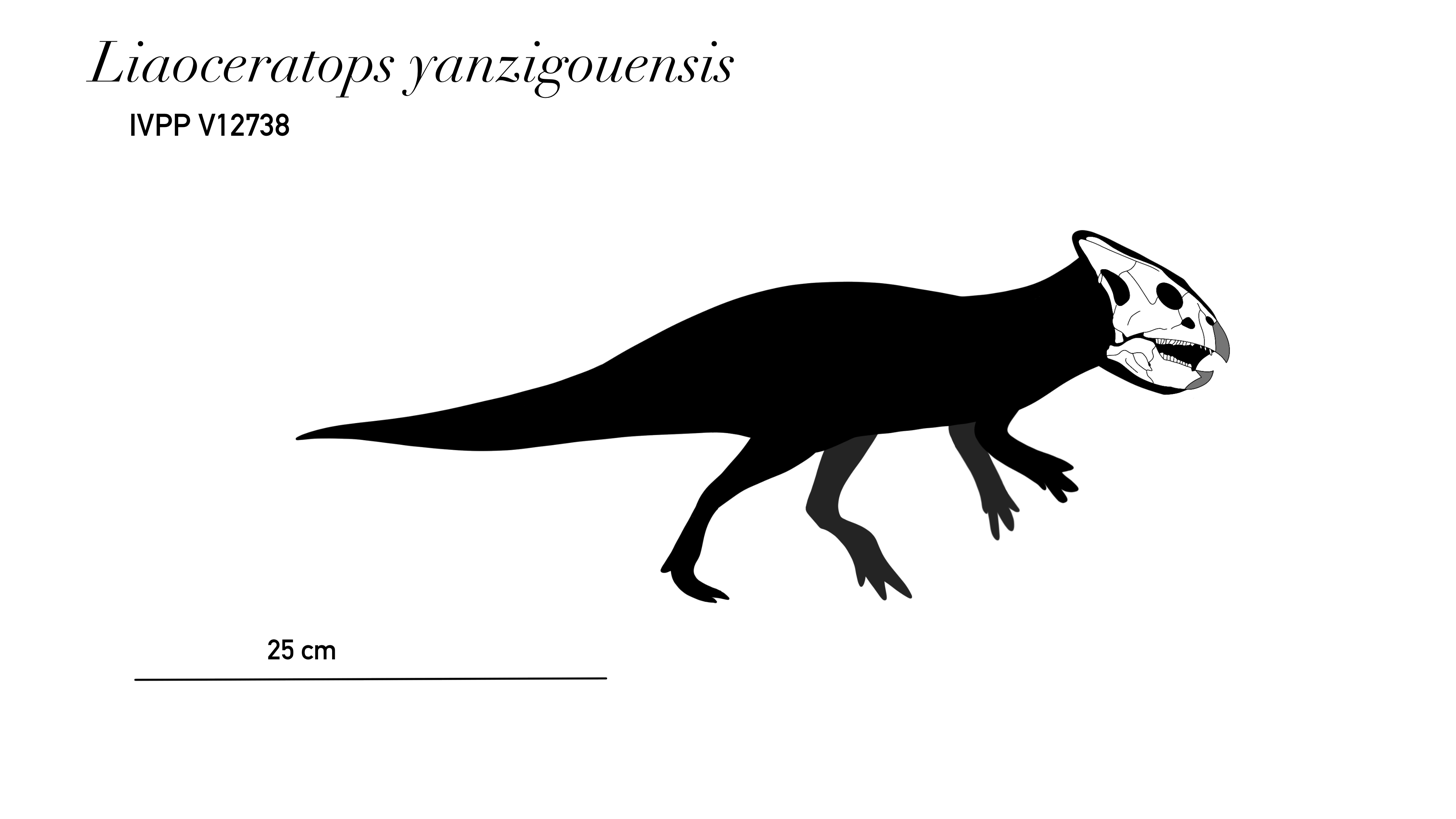
Skeletal restoration

Liaoceratops was discovered in the famous Liaoning Province of China, where several fossils of feathered dinosaurs have also been collected. The type species Liaoceratops yanzigouensis was in 2002 named and described by Xu Xing, Peter Makovicky, Wang Xiaolin, Mark Norell and You Hailu. The generic name is derived from Liaoning and the Greek keras, "horn" and ops, "face". The specific name refers to the town Yanzigou.

The holotype IVPP V12738 has been found in the Yixian Formation dating from the Barremian. These beds have also yielded fossil insects, fossils of ginkgo trees, and many other dinosaurs, including the early troodontid Sinovenator, also described by Makovicky later in 2002.

"This area is yielding extremely important information on the evolution of dinosaurs, mammals, insects, and flowering plants. I hope to find even more primitive specimens than Liaoceratops," Peter Makovicky said.

The holotype consists of an almost complete skull. As paratype specimen IVPP V12633 has been referred, the skull of a juvenile. In 2007 another skull, CAGS-IG-VD-002, of an even younger individual was referred. This lacked the skull roof, which has been explained as the result of a predator opening the braincase to eat the contents.

== Description and classification ==
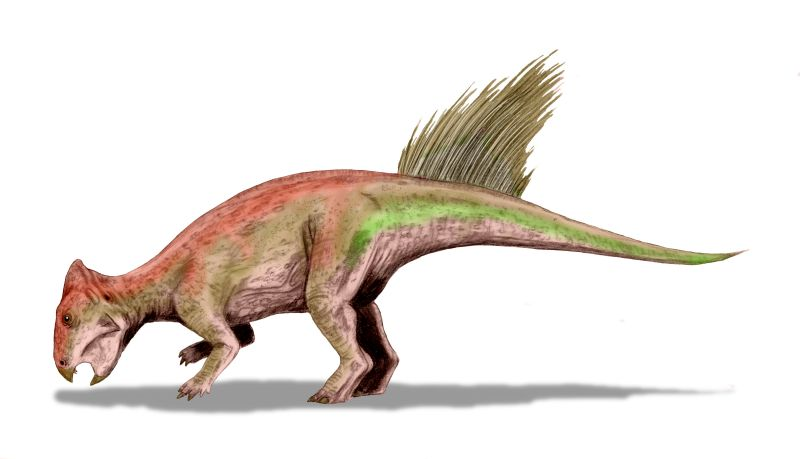
Artist's reconstruction

Liaoceratops was a relatively small dinosaur, reaching 50 cm (1.6 ft) in length and 2 kg (4.4 lb) in body mass. The holotype skull measures of 154 millimetres in length, weighing an estimated seven pounds and possessing only jugal horns and a small skull frill, lacking the orbital horns and true neck shield that characterized later ceratopsians.

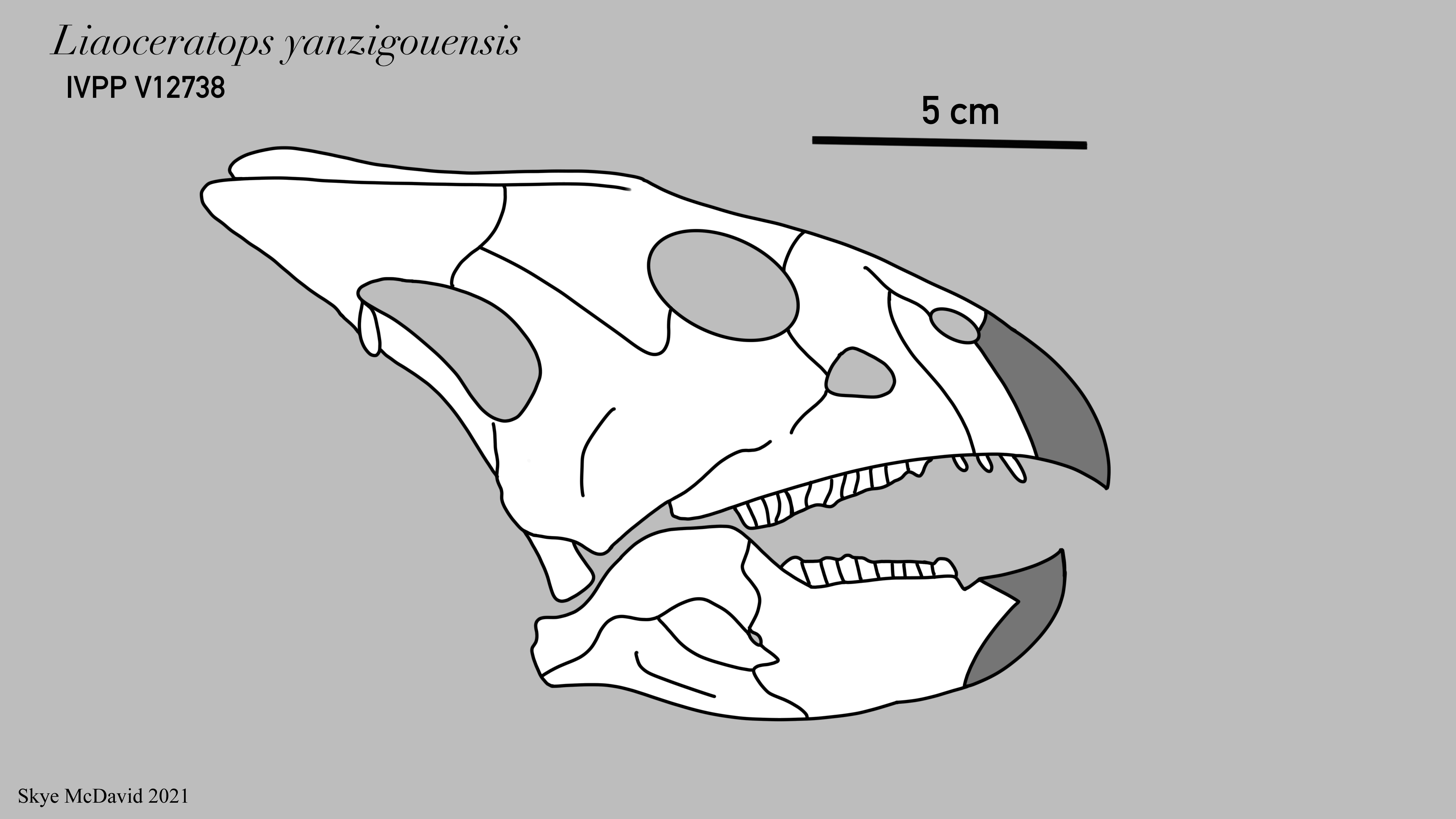
Diagram of skull

== Palaeobiology ==
=== Behavior ===
As a species of neoceratopsian, Liaoceratops fed on low-growing plants,such as ferns and cycads. Its small frill and jugal horns are hypothesized to possess function for species recognition and visual display rather than active defense.

Liaoceratops inhabited the forest and wetland environments of the Jehol Biota during the Early Cretaceous. Its body coloration is hypothesized to provide camouflage in dense forest habitats, similar to modern herbivores live in forest.

=== Senses ===
Because Liaoceratops had large olfactory bulbs for its size, it possessed an excellent sense of smell. Its long semicircular canals and clearly distinguishable floccular lobes suggest that it had an almost horizontal head posture and that it was bipedal. Its short cochlear ducts suggest that Liaoceratops individuals communicated with each other through high frequency vocalisations.

== See also ==
- Timeline of ceratopsian research
