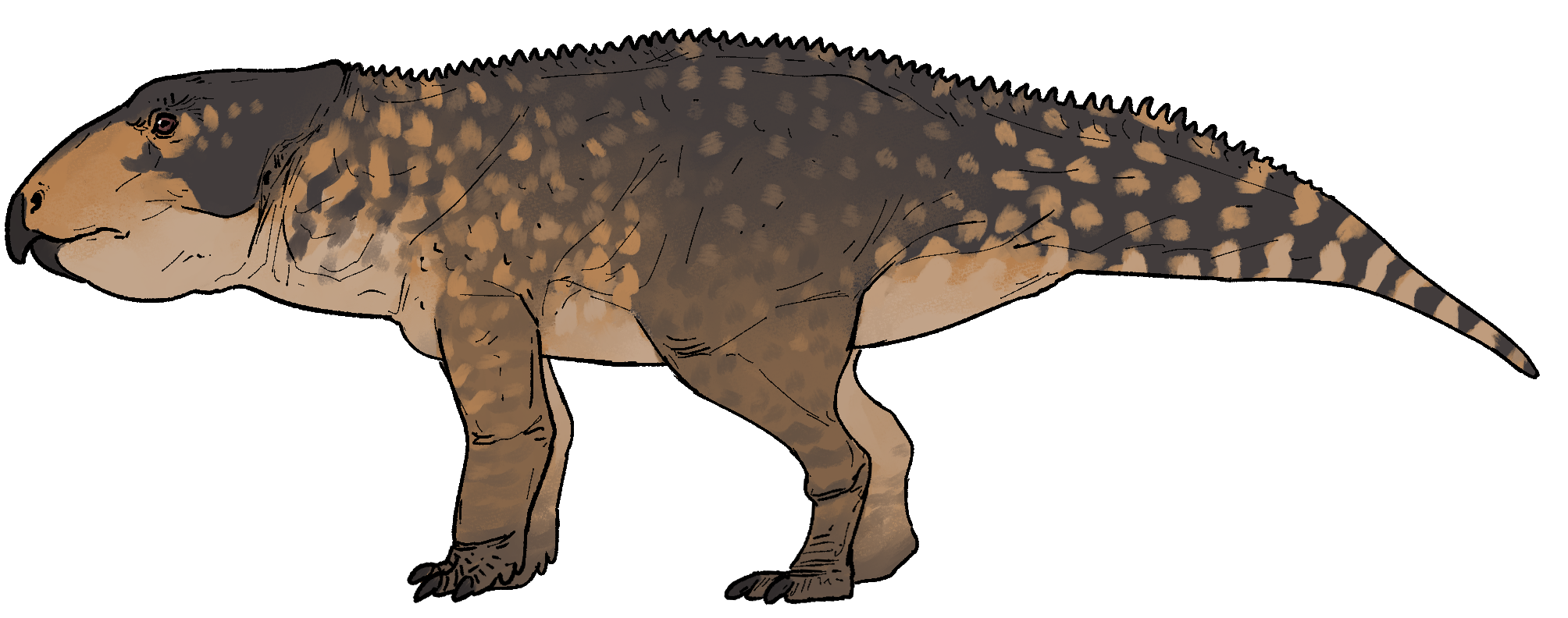
- Restoration

Scientific classification
- Kingdom: Animalia
- Phylum: Chordata
- Class: Reptilia
- Clade: Dinosauria
- Clade: †Ornithischia
- Clade: †Ceratopsia
- Clade: †Euceratopsia
- Family: †Leptoceratopsidae
- Genus: †Gremlin; Ryan et al., 2023
- Species: †G. slobodorum

Binomial name
- †Gremlin slobodorum Ryan et al., 2023

= Gremlin slobodorum =

Gremlin Temporal range: Campanian, 77 Ma

Extinct genus of dinosaurs

Gremlin (named after the mythical creature of the same name) is a genus of leptoceratopsid ceratopsian dinosaurs from the Campanian stage of the Cretaceous period, 77 million years ago. It contains one species, Gremlin slobodorum, named in 2023 by Michael J. Ryan and colleagues from a frontal bone found in the Oldman Formation of Alberta. It can be distinguished from other leptoceratopsids by a ridge on the frontal that runs transversely from the midline of the skull outwards to the top end of the orbit.

== Discovery and naming ==
Gremlin type locality in Alberta, Canada

The Gremlin holotype specimen, TMP 2011.053.0027, was discovered in sediments of the lower member of the Oldman Formation in southern Alberta, Canada. The specimen consists of an isolated right frontal (a bone above the eye) which has lost portions of its anterolateral margin, possibly due to erosion. In a 2022 conference abstract authored by L. Micucci and colleagues, they tentatively referred the specimen to Cerasinops since its holotype was found in rock layers of a similar age.

In 2023, Ryan and colleagues described Gremlin slobodorum as a new genus and species of leptoceratopsid based on these fossil remains. The generic name, "Gremlin", refers to the small troublesome mythical creatures of the same name. The specific name, "slobodorum", honors Ed and Wendy Sloboda who have contributed to paleontology in Canada and were involved in the holotype's discovery.

== Description ==
As a leptoceratopsid, Gremlin would have been a small dinosaur with a robust jaw bearing large teeth and a prominent beak. Unlike some other ceratopsians, they lack horns but would have possessed small frills on the back of their heads. Like that of other leptoceratopsids, the frontal of Gremlin is triangular in shape and bears a prominent depression on its posterior third. Uniquely in Gremlin, there is a prominent ridge running transversely across the frontal separated from the depression by 10 millimetres (0.39 in) of smooth surface. In front of the ridge the surface of the frontal has a rugose texture. In other leptoceratopsids the entire frontal surface in front of the depression is either rugose (as in Cerasinops and Prenoceratops) or smooth (as in Leptoceratops and Montanoceratops), and none bear a ridge separate from the rim of the depression. The transverse ridge represents the thickest point of the frontal, which tapers in front and behind it; in other leptoceratopsids the rim of the depression is the thickest point. Towards the centre the frontal raises slightly, which would have created a slight sagittal crest that would continue onto the unpreserved parietal.

== Classification ==
Ryan et al. (2023) recovered Gremlin as a non-coronosaurian ceratopsian using the dataset of Arbour and Evans (2019). Their phylogenetic analyses recovered an unresolved polytomy of most leptoceratopsids and some other similar dinosaurs at the base of the Coronosauria, with the leptoceratopsids Gryphoceratops and Unescoceratops recovered as sister taxa. The results of their phylogenetic analyses are displayed in the cladogram below.

- Ceratopsia
  - - Psittacosaurus mongoliensis
    - Psittacosaurus sinensis
  - - - Yinlong
      - - Hualianceratops
        - Xuanhuaceratops
        - Chaoyangosaurus
    - - Stenopelix
      - Liaoceratops
      - - - Asiaceratops
          - Mosaiceratops
        - - Yamaceratops
          - - Archaeoceratops
            - - - Aquilops
                - Graciliceratops
                - Auroraceratops
              - - Helioceratops
                - Koreaceratops
                - Cerasinops
                - Ferrisaurus
                - Gremlin
                - Ischioceratops
                - Leptoceratops
                - Montanoceratops
                - Prenoceratops
                - Udanoceratops
                - Zhuchengceratops
                - - Gryphoceratops
                  - Unescoceratops
                - Coronosauria

== Paleoenvironment ==
The ecosystem represented by the lower Oldman Formation was deposited at a time when the Western Interior Seaway was receding, creating a lush fluvial plain. It dates to the mid-Campanian age of the Late Cretaceous, around 77 million years ago. Dinosaurs such as Albertaceratops, Wendiceratops, Gryposaurus, and Stegoceras would have lived alongside Gremlin.
