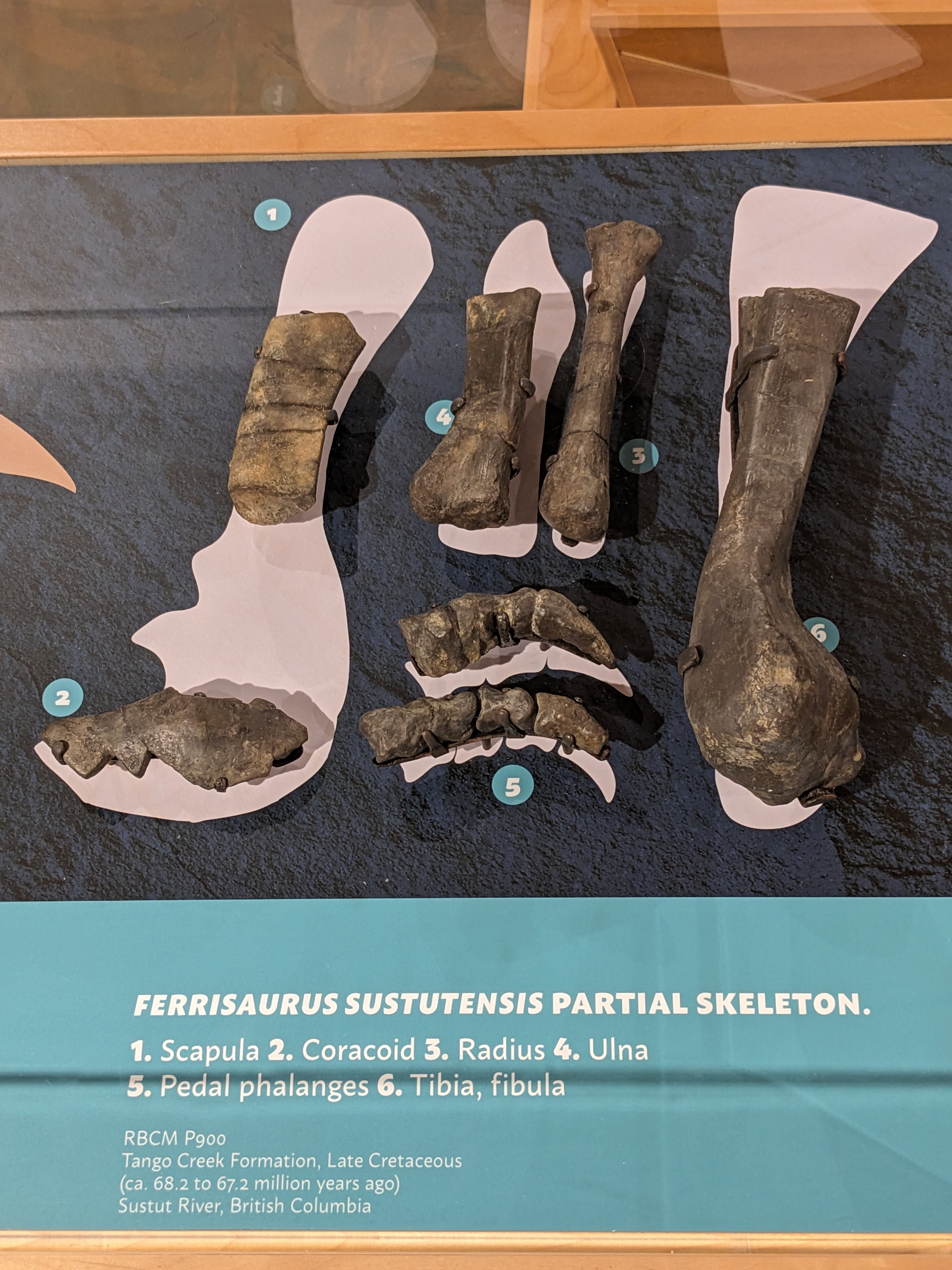
- Holotype RBCM P900

Scientific classification
- Kingdom: Animalia
- Phylum: Chordata
- Class: Reptilia
- Clade: Dinosauria
- Clade: †Ornithischia
- Clade: †Ceratopsia
- Family: †Leptoceratopsidae
- Genus: †Ferrisaurus; Arbour & Evans, 2019

Type species
- †Ferrisaurus sustutensis Arbour & Evans, 2019

= Ferrisaurus =

Ferrisaurus Temporal range: Maastrichtian, 68.2–67.2 Ma

Extinct genus of dinosaurs

Ferrisaurus is a genus of leptoceratopsid ceratopsian dinosaur from the Sustut Basin (Tango Creek Formation) in British Columbia, Canada. The type and only species is Ferrisaurus sustutensis. It is the first non-avian dinosaur described from British Columbia.

== Discovery and naming ==
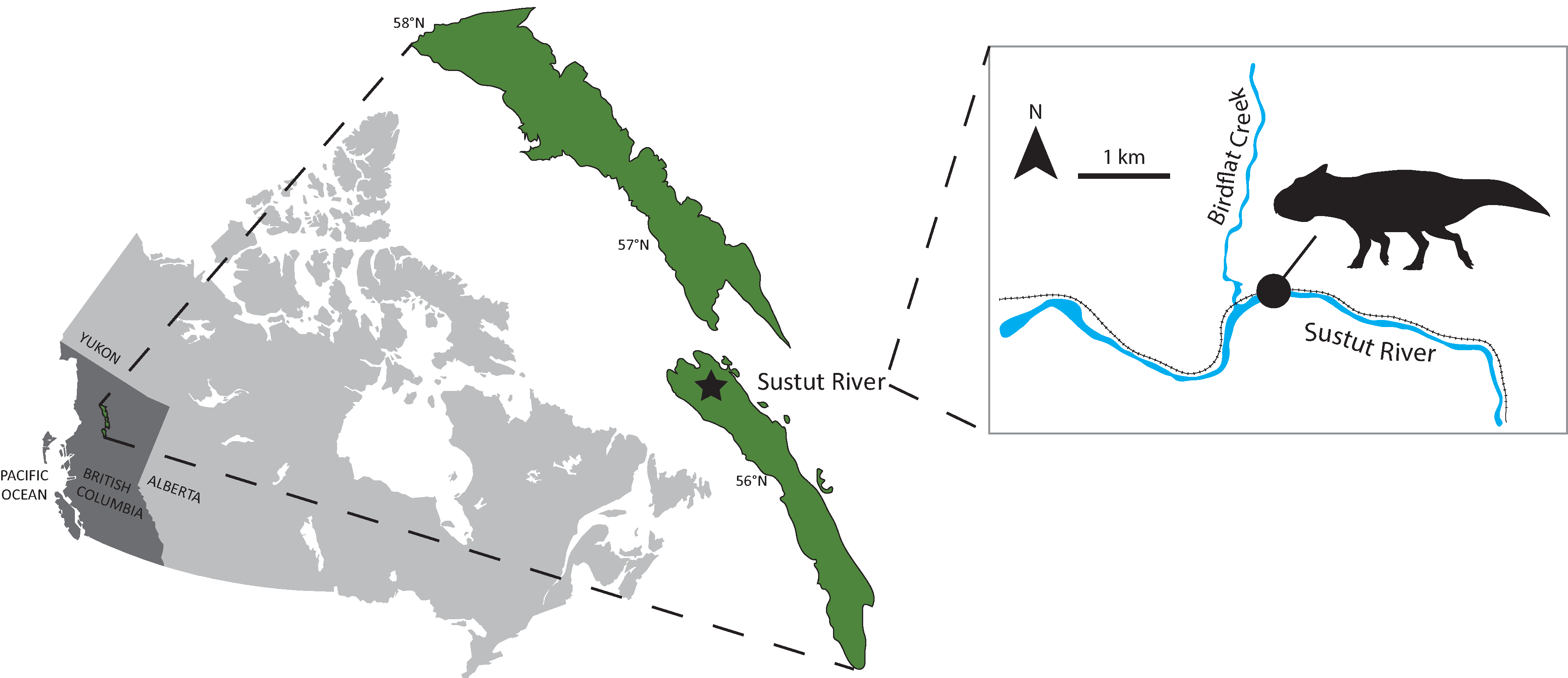
Provenance of the holotype specimen of Ferrisaurus

During 1971 Canadian geologist Kenny F. Larsen discovered dinosaur remains while exploring the Sustut Basin in north-central British Columbia while prospecting for Thorium, the first found in the province. The fossils were discovered because they were slightly radioactive, from a talus deposit along a railway cut near the confluence of Birdflat Creek and Sustut River. Larsen's imprecise field notes and lack of a field map complicate identification of the exact stratigraphic unit the fossils came from. Matrix remaining on the bones is a dark grey sandy siltstone, the area around the fossil discovery is multiple beds of sandstone, mudstone, conglomerate and shale, with slightly radioactive bitumen seams. These deposits are part of the Sustut Group, and Canadian palaeontologists Victoria Arbour and Milton Graves interpreted their characteristics in 2008 as suggesting that the fossils were found in the Lower Laslui Member of the Brothers Peak Formation. Larsen originally held onto the fossils until 2004, when he donated them to Dalhousie University before being accessioned by the Royal BC Museum in 2006 as RBCM.EH.2006.019.

Arbour and Graves first described the fossils, a partial skeleton with elements of the forelimb, hindlimb, and foot, interpreting them as an ornithischian of uncertain taxonomy, with similarities to thescelosaurids and pachycephalosaurids. They did not name the material, but noted that if it was from the Brothers Peak Formation it would be late Campanian to early Maastrichtian in age. Some elements were only tentatively identified, and proportions suggested that it was possible more than one individual was present despite some articulation of the foot and lower leg. Arbour revisited the specimen with Canadian palaeontologist David C. Evans in 2019, revising many of the previous interpretations of its anatomy and provenance. The specimen, renumbered as RBCM P900, was the only vertebrate fossil described from the Sustut Basin, but a fragment of the turtle Basilemys was found in a location matching the description of Larsen for the locality of RBCM P900. This discovery allowed for new stratigraphic data to identify the beds as the Tango Creek Formation and give a late Maastrichtian age based on palynology. Arbour and Evans also reidentified multiple of the bones, instead considering that the pectoral girdle, forearm, and lower leg were present, with this reidentification allowing for RBCM P900 to be given the name Ferrisaurus sustutensis as a distinct leptoceratopsid. The genus name translates as "iron lizard" from the Latin ferrum and Ancient Greek σαῦρος (sauros) in reference to the discovery along a rail line, and the species name refers to its provenance from the Sustut Group in the Sustut Basin. The presumed holotype locality included a Maastrichtian marker palynomorph taxon indicating an age of roughly 68.2–67.2 million years old for Ferrisaurus, within the Tatlatui Member of the Tango Creek Formation. The specimen is nicknamed "Buster".

== Classification ==
Despite the initial identification of the fossils of Ferrisaurus as either a thescelosaurid or pachycephalosaurid, reidentification of bones shows that it has proportions that exclude it from either group, with preserved anatomy being much more similar to leptoceratopsids such as Cerasinops or Leptoceratops. Ferrisaurus shares a bent ulna with Cerasinops and Prenoceratops, a fused astragalus and tibia with Montanoceratops, and proportions of the foot with Udanoceratops. Arbour and Evans recovered Ferrisaurus within Leptoceratopsidae with a phylogenetic analysis, though its incompleteness hindered resolution.

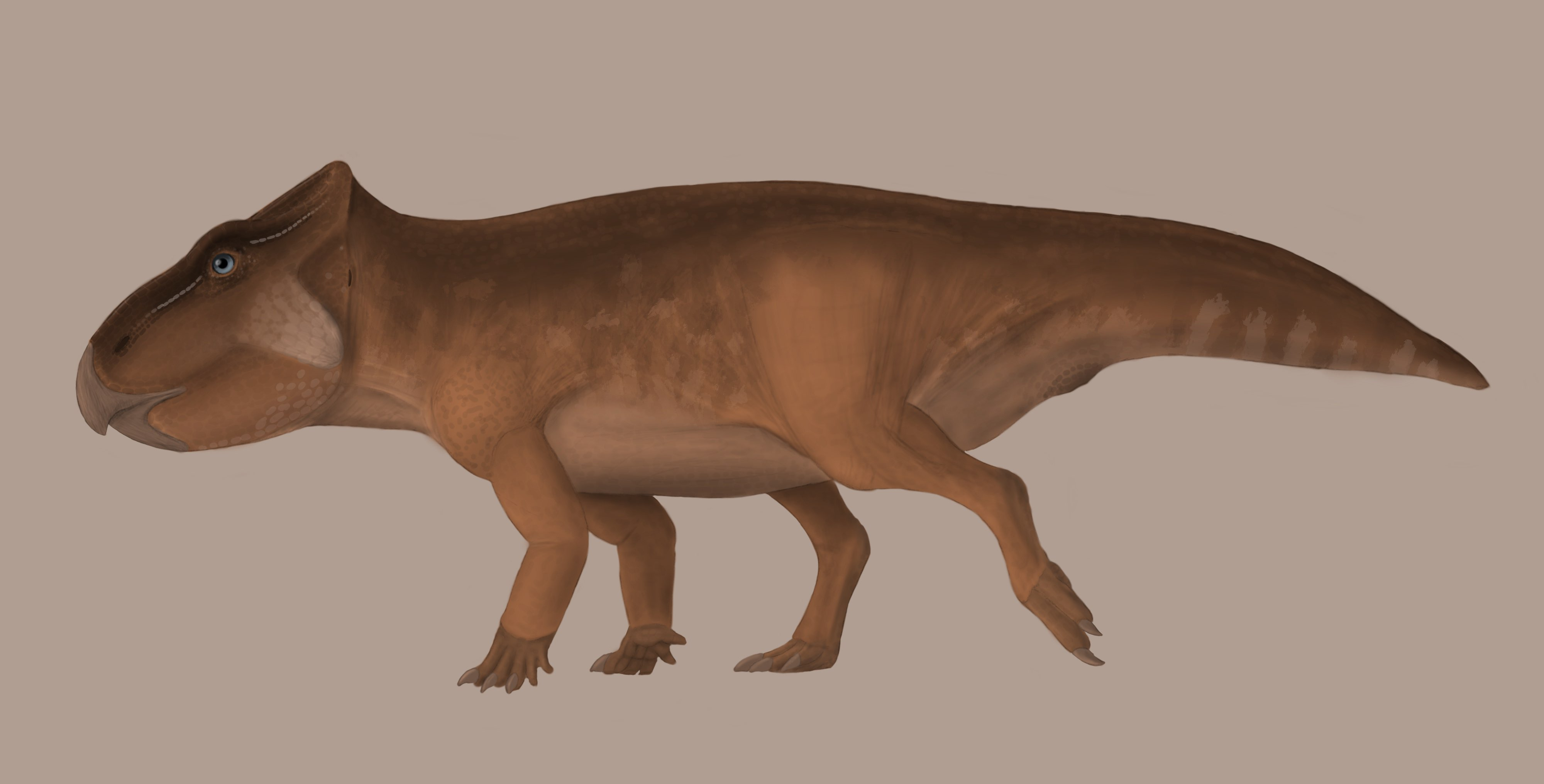
Life restoration

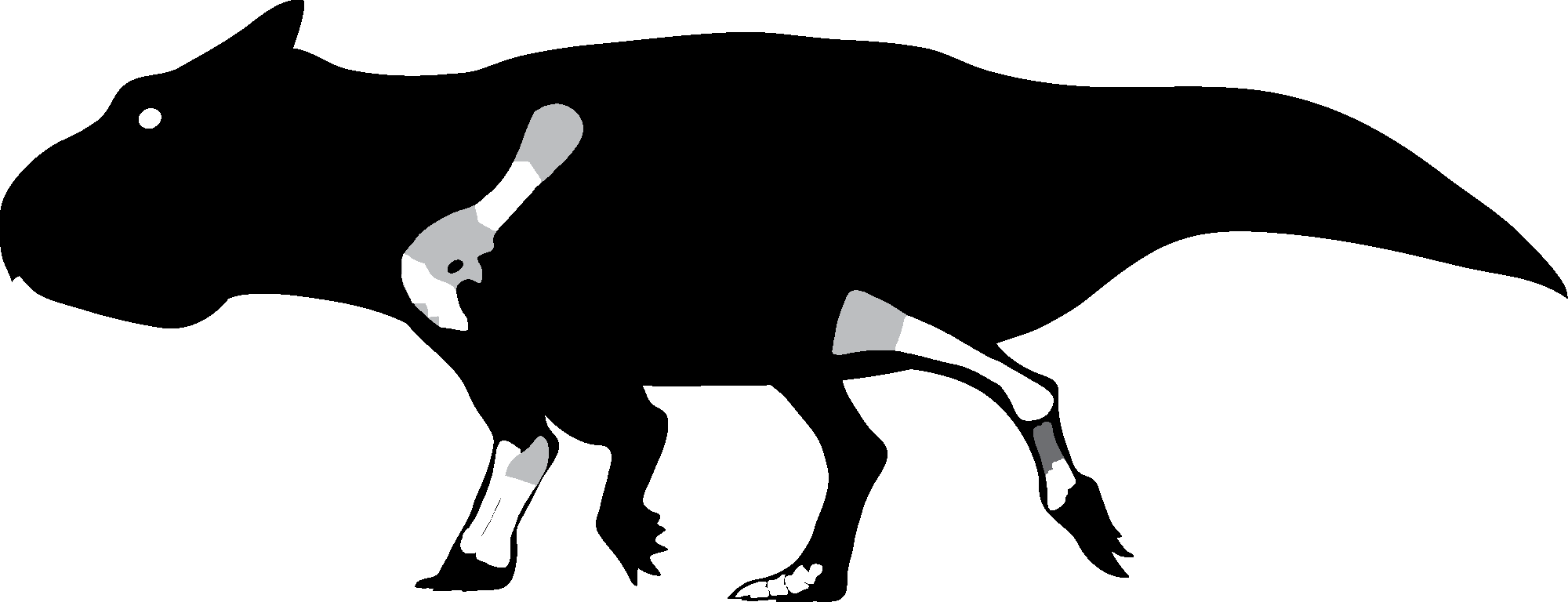
Skeletal diagram of the holotype of Ferrisaurus

- Leptoceratopsidae
  - Asiaceratops
  - - Cerasinops
    - - - Ischioceratops
        - Montanoceratops
      - - Prenoceratops
        - - Ferrisaurus
          - Gryphoceratops
          - Leptoceratops
          - Udanoceratops
          - Unescoceratops
          - Zhuchengceratops
