= Oldman Formation =

Geologic formation in Canada

- Stratigraphic range: Campanian, 77.5–76.5 Ma
- Type: Geological formation
- Unit of: Belly River Group
- Underlies: Dinosaur Park Formation
- Overlies: Foremost Formation
- Thickness: up to 328 feet (100 m)

Lithology
- Primary: Sandstone
- Other: Mudstone and bentonite

Location
- Coordinates: 49°37′41″N 112°53′23″W
- Region: Western Canada Sedimentary Basin
- Country: Canada

Type section
- Named for: Oldman River
- Named by: Russell, L.S. and Landes, R.W.
- Year defined: 1940
- Oldman Formation (Canada) Oldman Formation (Alberta)

The Oldman Formation is a stratigraphic unit of Late Cretaceous (Campanian stage) age that underlies much of southern Alberta, Canada. It consists primarily of sandstones that were deposited in fluvial channel and floodplain environments. It was named for exposures along the Oldman River between its confluence with the St. Mary River and the city of Lethbridge, and it is known primarily for its dinosaur remains and other fossils.

== Lithology ==
The Oldman Formation is composed primarily of light-colored, fine-grained sandstones. They are upward-fining, lenticular to sheet-like bodies that are yellowish, steep-faced and blocky in outcrop. The formation also includes lesser amounts of siltstone and mudstone.

== Depositional environments ==
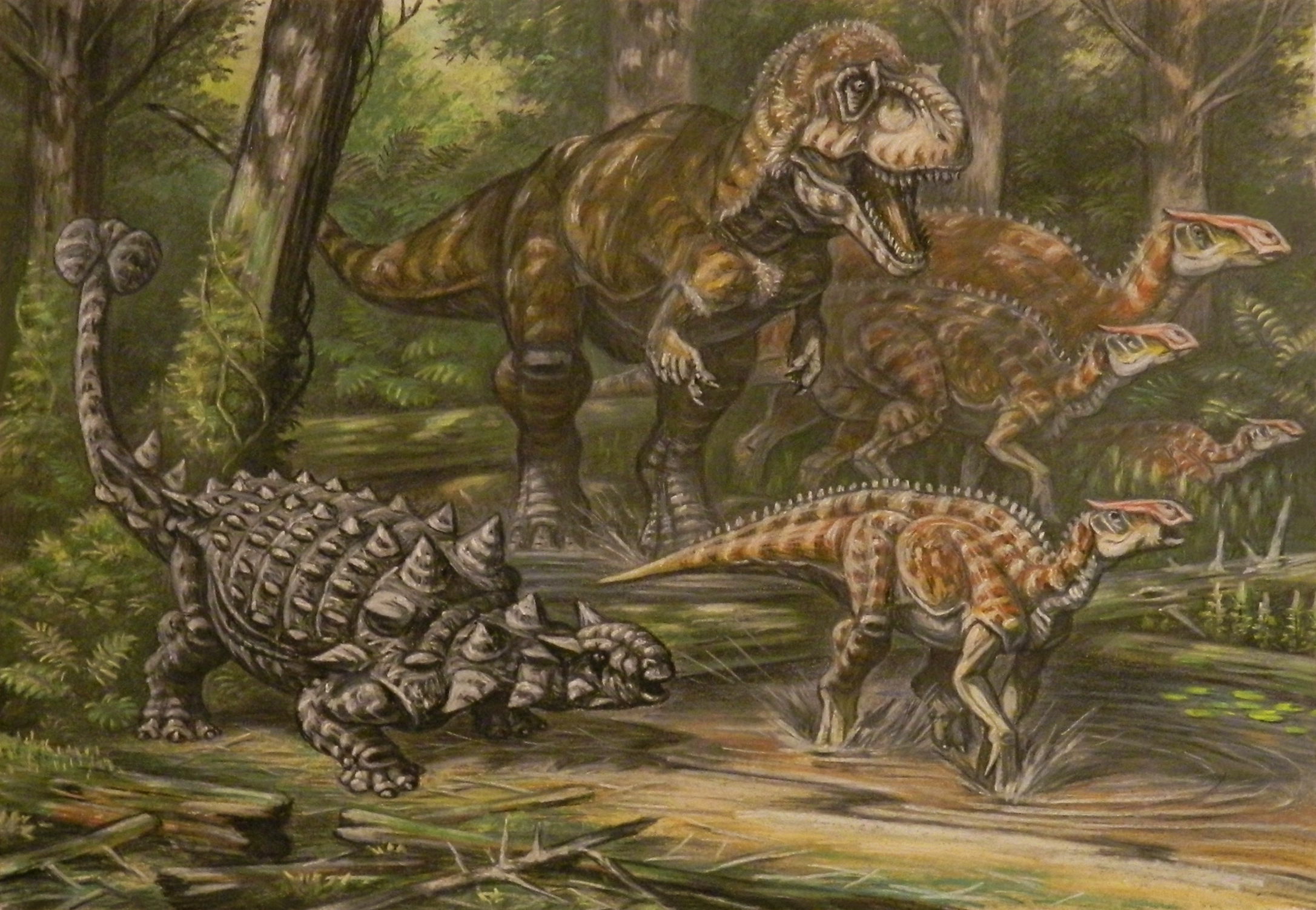
Dinosaurs of the Oldman Formation

The sediments of the Oldman Formation were deposited in fluvial channels (the sandstones) and a variety of channel margin, overbank and floodplain environments (the siltstones and mudstones). The formation is about 40 metres (130 ft) thick at Dinosaur Provincial Park in southeastern Alberta. It thickens toward the southwest, and northwestern Montana appears to have been the primary source of the sediments.

== Relationship to other units ==
The Oldman Formation is a member of the Belly River Group (also known as the Judith River Group). It conformably overlies the Foremost Formation, and is separated from the overlying Dinosaur Park Formation by a regional disconformity. The sediments of the Oldman are superficially similar to those of the Dinosaur Park, which was included in the Oldman Formation prior to the recognition of the disconformity. The two formations can also be distinguished by petrographic and sedimentologic differences. In Central Montana, The Oldman Formation is equivalent to the upper part of the Mclelland Ferry Member, as well as the Woodhawk and Coal Ridge Members of the Judith River Formation. It is also believed to be equivalent to parts of the Two Medicine Formation in Western Montana.

== Age ==
The Oldman Formation was deposited during the middle Campanian, between about 77.5 and 76.5 million years ago. It lies fully within magnetic polarity Chron 33n.

== Fossil content ==
List of dinosaurs found in the formation:

Color key: Taxon / Reclassified taxon / Taxon falsely reported as present / Dubious taxon or junior synonym / Ichnotaxon / Ootaxon / Morphotaxon

Notes
Uncertain or tentative taxa are in small text
~~crossed out~~ taxa are discredited.

=== Theropods ===
==== Tyrannosaurids ====
Tyrannosaurids of the Oldman Formation
Genus	Species	Stratigraphic position	Material	Notes	Images
Daspletosaurus	D. torosus	Comrey	Skeleton	A tyrannosaurine tyrannosaurid	
Daspletosaurus	D. wilsoni	Upper	Two skulls with associated postcrania	A tyrannosaurine tyrannosaurid, may be a synonym of D. torosus	
Tromerosaurus	T. solumons	Comrey	A partial skull and skeleton	An albertosaurine tyrannosaurid, also known from the Dinosaur Park Formation	

==== Ornithomimids ====
Ornithomimidss of the Oldman Formation
Genus	Species	Stratigraphic position	Material	Notes	Images
Qiupalong	Q. sp.		Skeleton	Provenance uncertain; may instead be from the Dinosaur Park Formation	
Struthiomimus	S. altus			Provenance uncertain; may instead be from the Dinosaur Park Formation	

==== Paravians ====
Paravians of the Oldman Formation
Genus	Species	Stratigraphic position	Material	Notes	Images
Dromaeosaurus	D. albertensis		Teeth	A dromaeosaurid, also found in the Dinosaur Park Formation	
cf. Hesperonychus	Indeterminate		Pedal phalanges	A microraptorian dromaeosaurid	
Prismatoolithus	P. levis		Partial clutch containing 12 eggs	Eggs belong to a troodontid	
cf. Paronychodon	cf. P. lacustris		Teeth		
Richardoestesia	R. isosceles		Teeth		
Richardoestesia	cf. R. gilmorei		Teeth		
Saurornitholestes	S. langstoni		Teeth	A dromaeosaurid	
Troodontidae indet.	Indeterminate		Teeth		

=== Ornithischians ===
==== Ceratopsians ====
Ceratopsians of the Oldman Formation
Genus	Species	Stratigraphic position	Material	Notes	Images
Albertaceratops	A. nesmoi	Lower	Single skull	A centrosaurine ceratopsid	
Centrosaurus	C. apertus	Upper	Bonebed	A centrosaurine ceratopsid, also known from the Dinosaur Park Formation	
Chasmosaurus	C. sp.	Upper	Fragmentary skull	A chasmosaurine ceratopsid	
Coronosaurus	C. brinkmani	Comrey sandstone	Bonebed	A centrosaurine ceratopsid, previously classified as a species of Centrosaurus	
Gremlin	G. slobodorum	Lower	A right frontal	A leptoceratopsid	
Nasutoceratopsini indet.	Indeterminate	Upper	Partial skull	A centrosaurine ceratopsid, likely a new taxon	
Prenoceratops	P. sp.	Upper	A right frontal	A leptoceratopsid; specimen could instead belong to Cerasinops or Unescoceratops	
Spinops	S. sternbergorum		Partial skull	A centrosaurine ceratopsid; provenance uncertain; may instead be from the Dinosaur Park Formation	
Wendiceratops	W. pinhornensis	Lower	Bonebed	A centrosaurine ceratopsid	

==== Pachycephalosaurs ====
Pachycephalosaurs of the Oldman Formation
Genus	Species	Stratigraphic position	Material	Notes	Images
Brontotholus	B. sp.	Upper	Skull dome	A pachycephalosaurid, also found in the Two Medicine Formation	
Foraminacephale	F. brevis	Upper		A pachycephalosaurid, once thought to be a species of Stegoceras	
Stegoceras	S. validum		Skull domes	A pachycephalosaurid; some Oldman specimens previously classified as synonyms Hanssuesia and Gravitholus	

==== Hadrosaurs ====
Hadrosaurs of the Oldman Formation
Genus	Species	Stratigraphic position	Material	Notes	Images
Brachylophosaurus	B. canadensis	Comrey sandstone	Two skeletons	A saurolophine hadrosaurid, also known from the Judith River Formation	
Gryposaurus	G. sp.	Lower	Bonebed	A saurolophine hadrosaurid	
Lambeosaurinae indet.	Indeterminate		Bonebed	Juvenile remains, formerly assigned to Corythosaurus stebingeri	
Maiasaura	M. sp.	Comrey sandstone	Partial skull	A saurolophine hadrosaurid, also known from the Two Medicine Formation	
Plesiolophus	P. warnerensis	Comrey sandstone	Partial skull	A lambeosaurine hadrosaurid	

==== Other ornithischians ====
Other Ornithischians of the Oldman Formation
Genus	Species	Stratigraphic position	Material	Notes	Images
Albertadromeus	A. syntarsus	Upper	Skeleton	A orodromine thescelosaurid	
Ankylosauridae indet.	Indeterminate		Teeth		
Scolosaurus	S. cutleri		Mummy	An ankylosaurine ankylosaurid; provenance uncertain; may instead be from the Dinosaur Park Formation	

== See also ==
- List of fossil sites (with link directory)
- List of dinosaur-bearing rock formations
