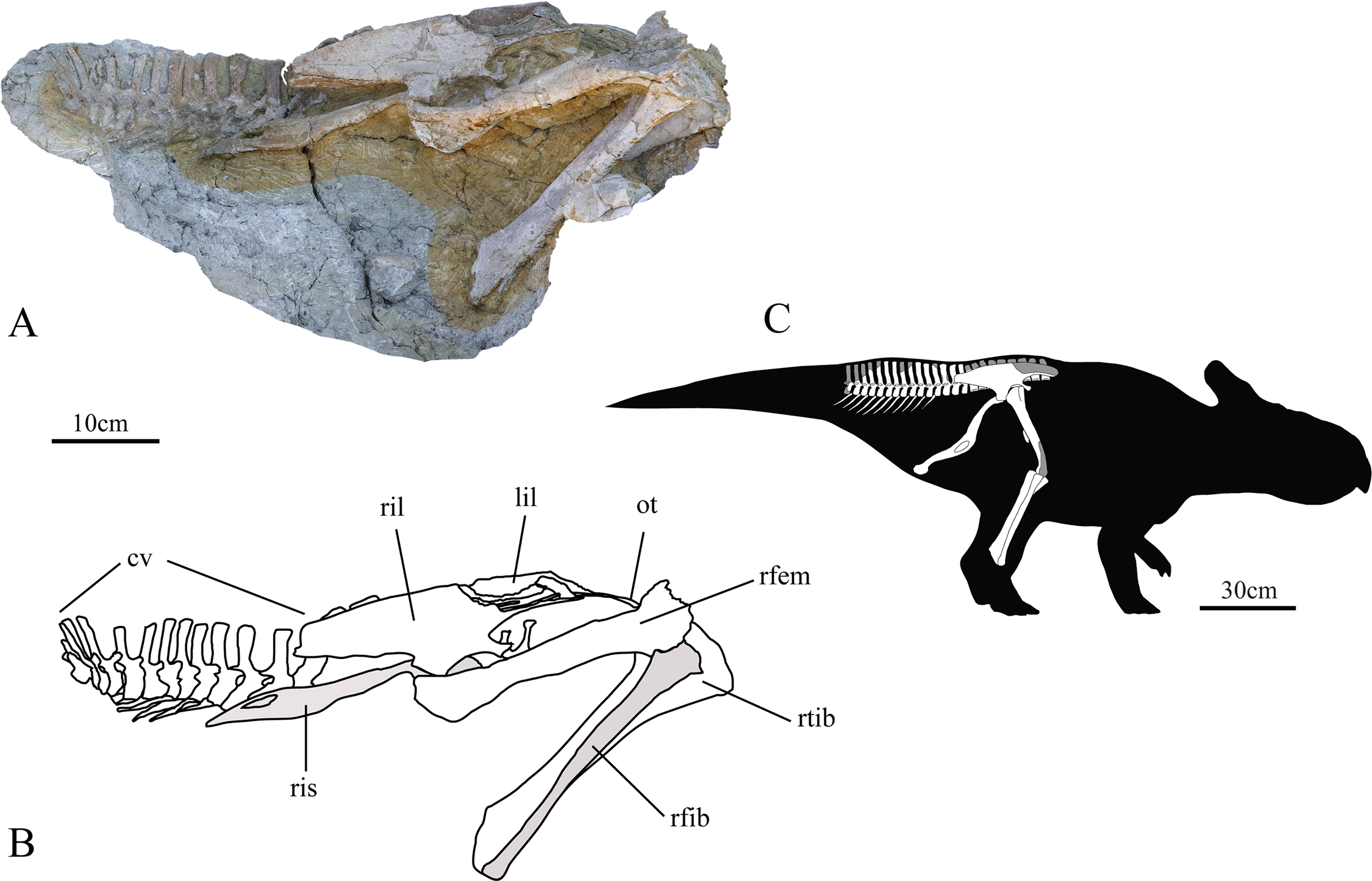
- Holotype

Scientific classification
- Kingdom: Animalia
- Phylum: Chordata
- Class: Reptilia
- Clade: Dinosauria
- Clade: †Ornithischia
- Clade: †Ceratopsia
- Family: †Leptoceratopsidae
- Genus: †Ischioceratops
- Species: †I. zhuchengensis

Binomial name
- †Ischioceratops zhuchengensis He et al., 2015

= Ischioceratops =

Ischioceratops Temporal range: 77.3–73.5 Ma

Extinct genus of dinosaurs

Ischioceratops (lit. 'ischium-horned face') is an extinct genus of small herbivorous ceratopsian dinosaur that lived approximately 77.3-73.5 million years ago during the latter part of the Cretaceous Period in what is now China.

Ischioceratops was a small sized, moderately-built, ground-dwelling, quadrupedal herbivore, whose total body length has been estimated to be about 2 m (6.6 ft). The ceratopsians were a group of dinosaurs with parrot-like beaks which fed on vegetation and thrived in North America and Asia during the Cretaceous Period, which ended approximately 66 million years ago, at which point they all became extinct. Its name means "ischium horned face", referring to the peculiar shape of the ischiatic bones.

Ischioceratops existed in the Wangshi Group during the late Cretaceous. It lived alongside centrosaurines, saurolophines, and tyrannosaurines. The most common creatures in the formation were Sinoceratops and Zhuchengtyrannus.

== Discovery and naming ==
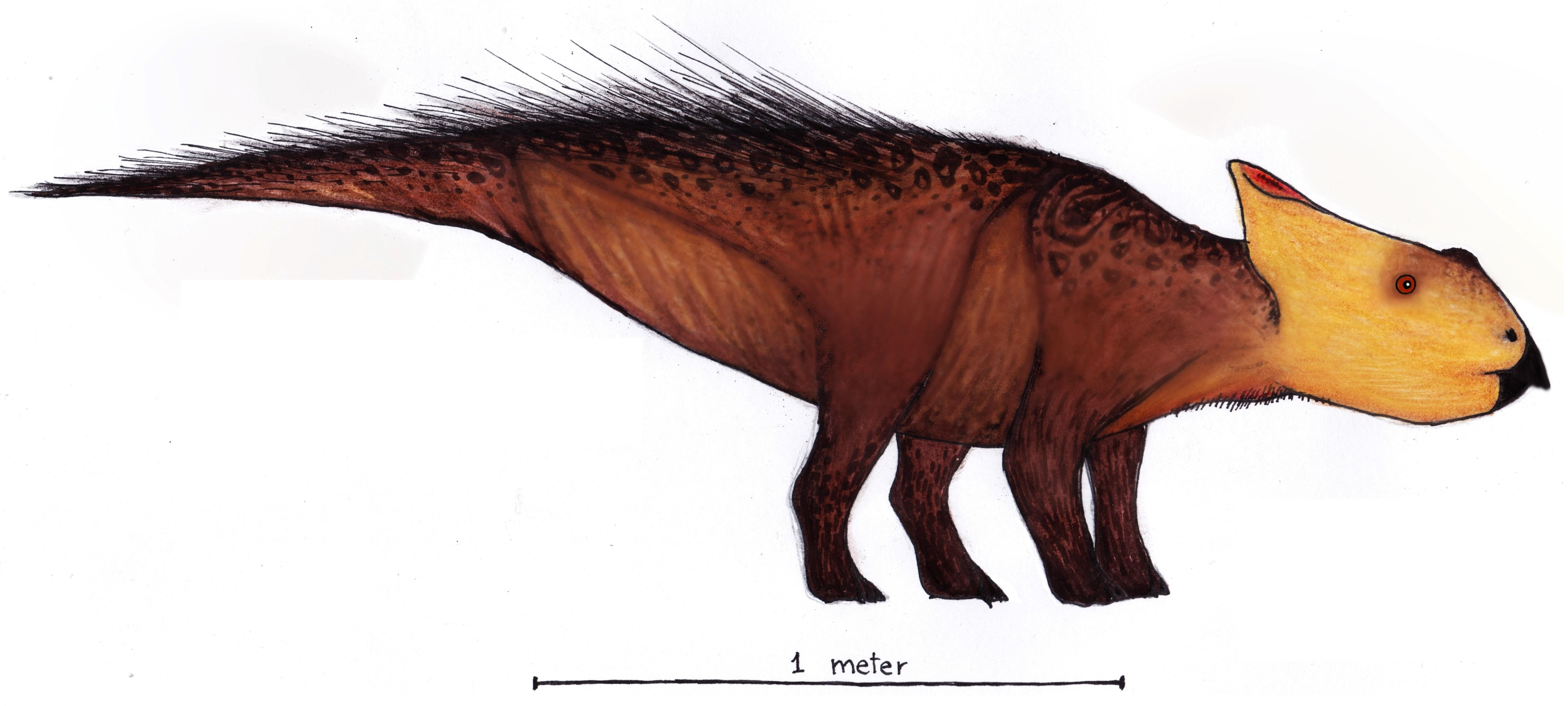
Restoration

In 2015, the type species Ischioceratops zhuchengensis was named and described by He Yiming, Peter J. Makovicky, Wang Kebai, Chen Shuqing, Corwin Sullivan, Han Fenglu and Xu Xing. The generic name combines a reference to the os ischii, its uniquely formed ischium, with ~ceratops, "horn face", a usual suffix in the names of Ceratopia. The suffix itself is derived from Greek keras, "horn", and ops, "face". The specific name refers to the provenance from Zhucheng. Because the name was published in an electronic publication, PLoS ONE, Life Science Identifiers were required for its validity. These were 19A423ED-8EAA -4842-9ECF-695876EC5EC0 for the genus and 71CD0FAE-070C-4CC4-96CC-B37D5B1071CE for the species. Ischioceratops was one of eighteen dinosaur taxa from 2015 to be described in open access or free-to-read journals.

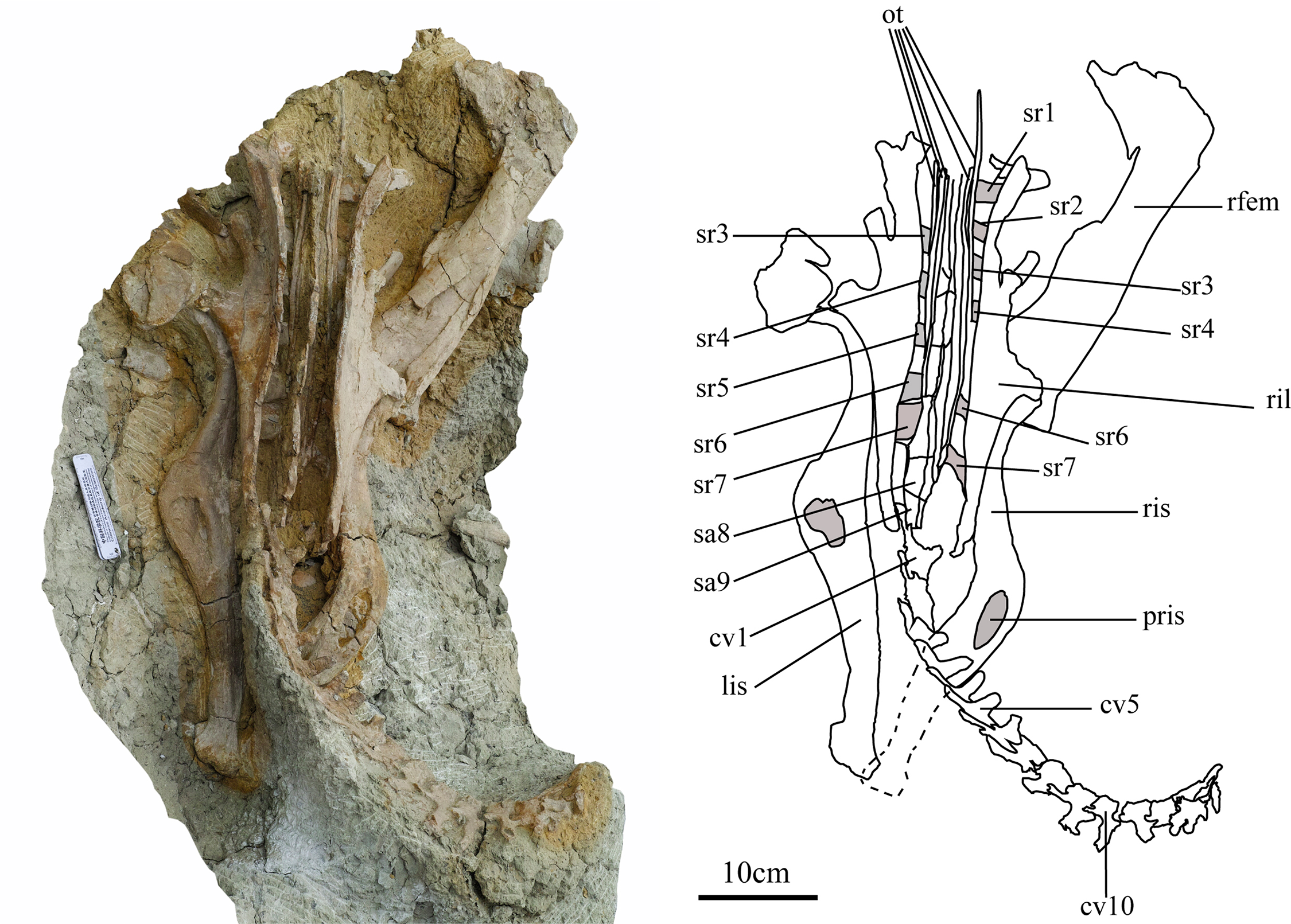
Holotype seen from above

The holotype ZCDM V0O016 was discovered in Kugou, a locality in the Shandong Province of China which presents layers of the Upper Cretaceous Wangshi Group, possibly dating from the late Campanian or earliest Maastrichtian. It is part of the Zhucheng Dinosaur Museum collection and it represents an incomplete, partially articulated specimen comprising the entire sacrum, a few ossified tendons, both halves of the pelvis, the anteriormost fifteen caudal vertebrae in an articulated series, and the right femur, tibia and fibula.

== Description ==
=== Size and distinguishing traits ===
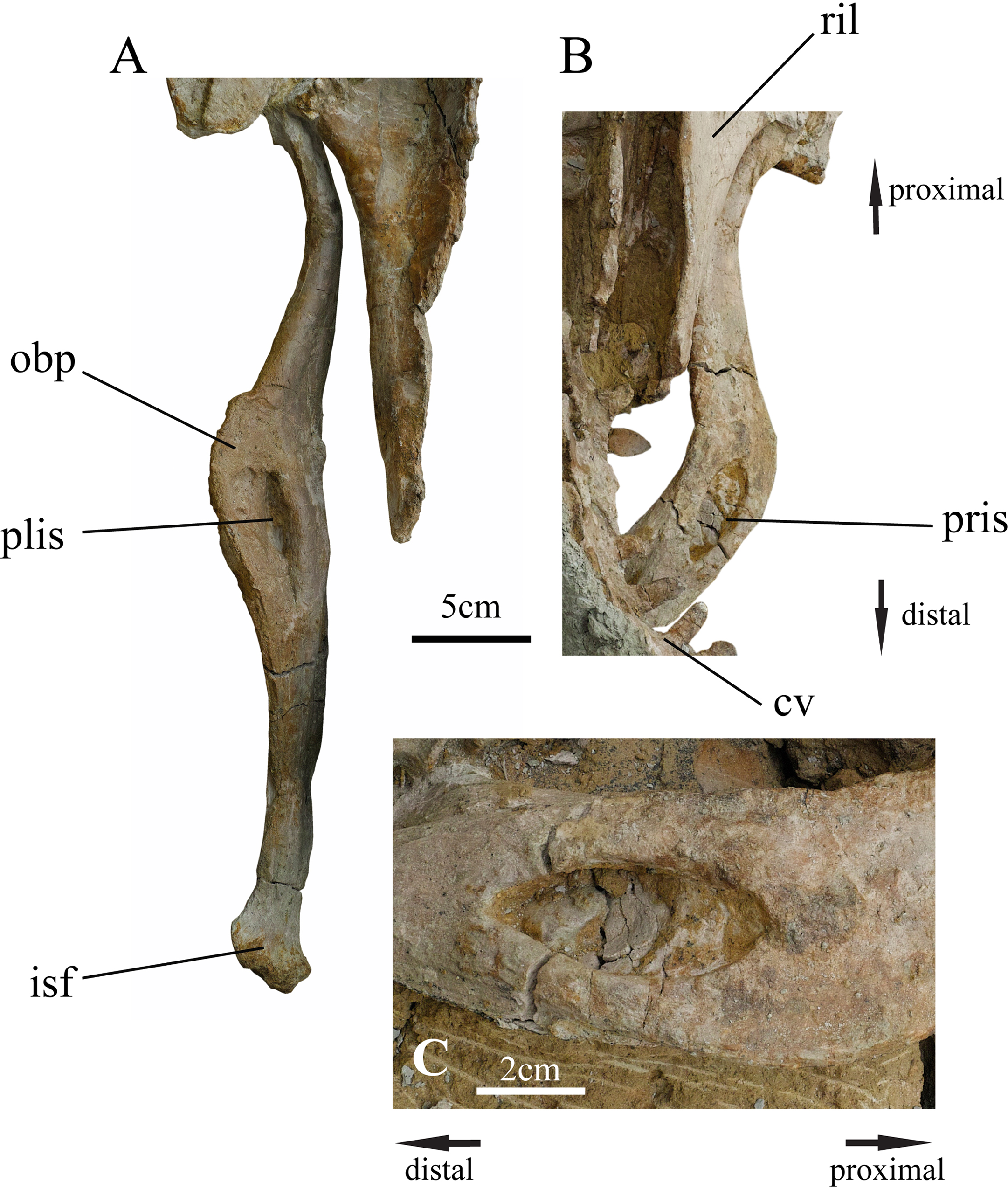
The unique ischium

Ischioceratops was a relatively small ceratopsian, reaching 2 m (6.6 ft) in length. The describing authors indicated some distinguishing traits. The taxon has been referred to Leptoceratopsidae and is distinguished from other known leptoceratopsids based on the following combination of characters: nine sacral vertebrae, more than in any other known basal (non-ceratopsid) ceratopsian but fewer than in ceratopsids; the ischium has a robust shaft that resembles that of a recurved bow and flares gradually to form a subrectangular-shaped obturator process in its middle portion while an elliptical fenestra perforates the obturator process. This morphology, unique for the Dinosauria as a whole, was seen as a single autapomorphy, unique derived character.

=== Skeleton ===
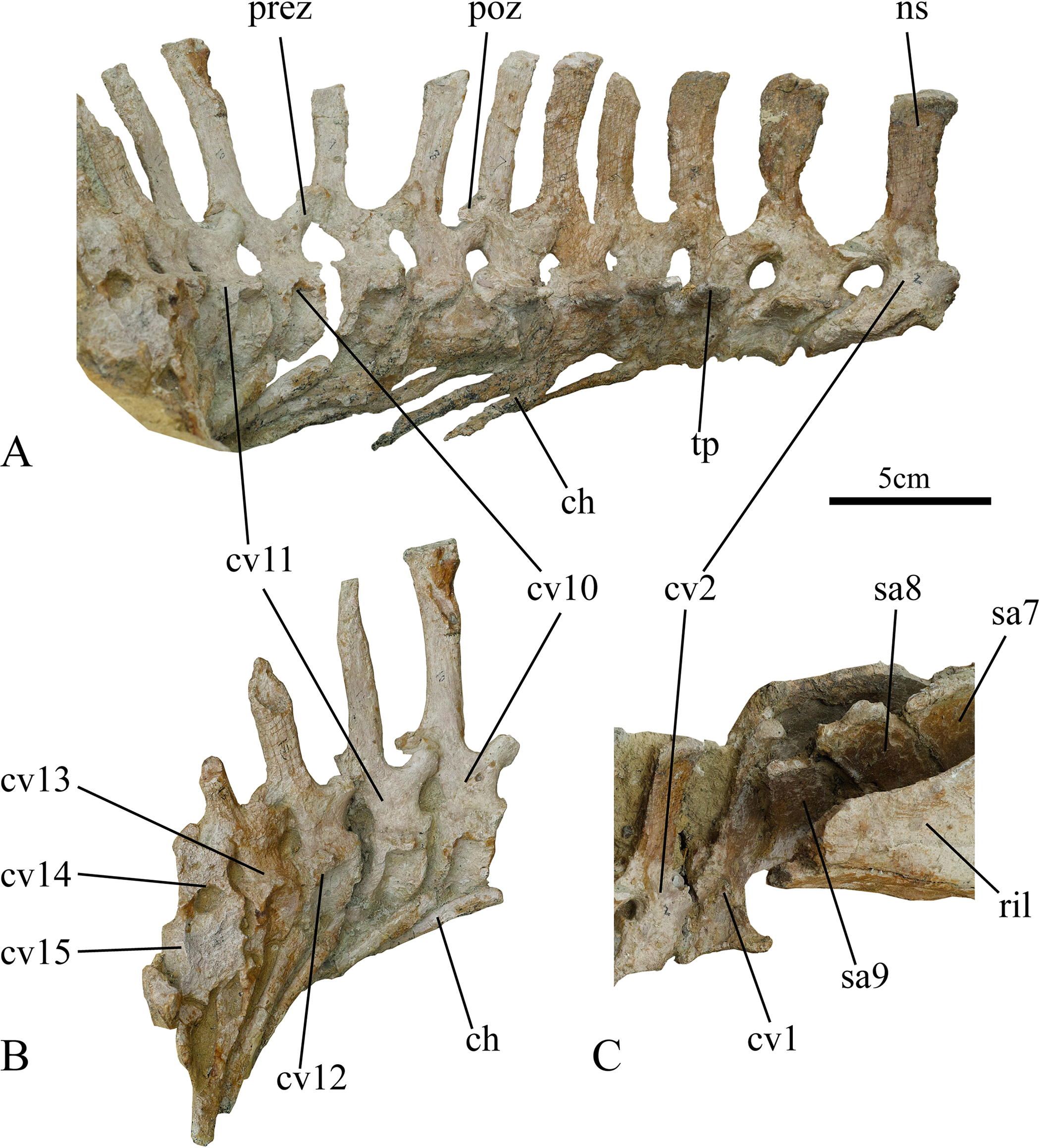
The tail section

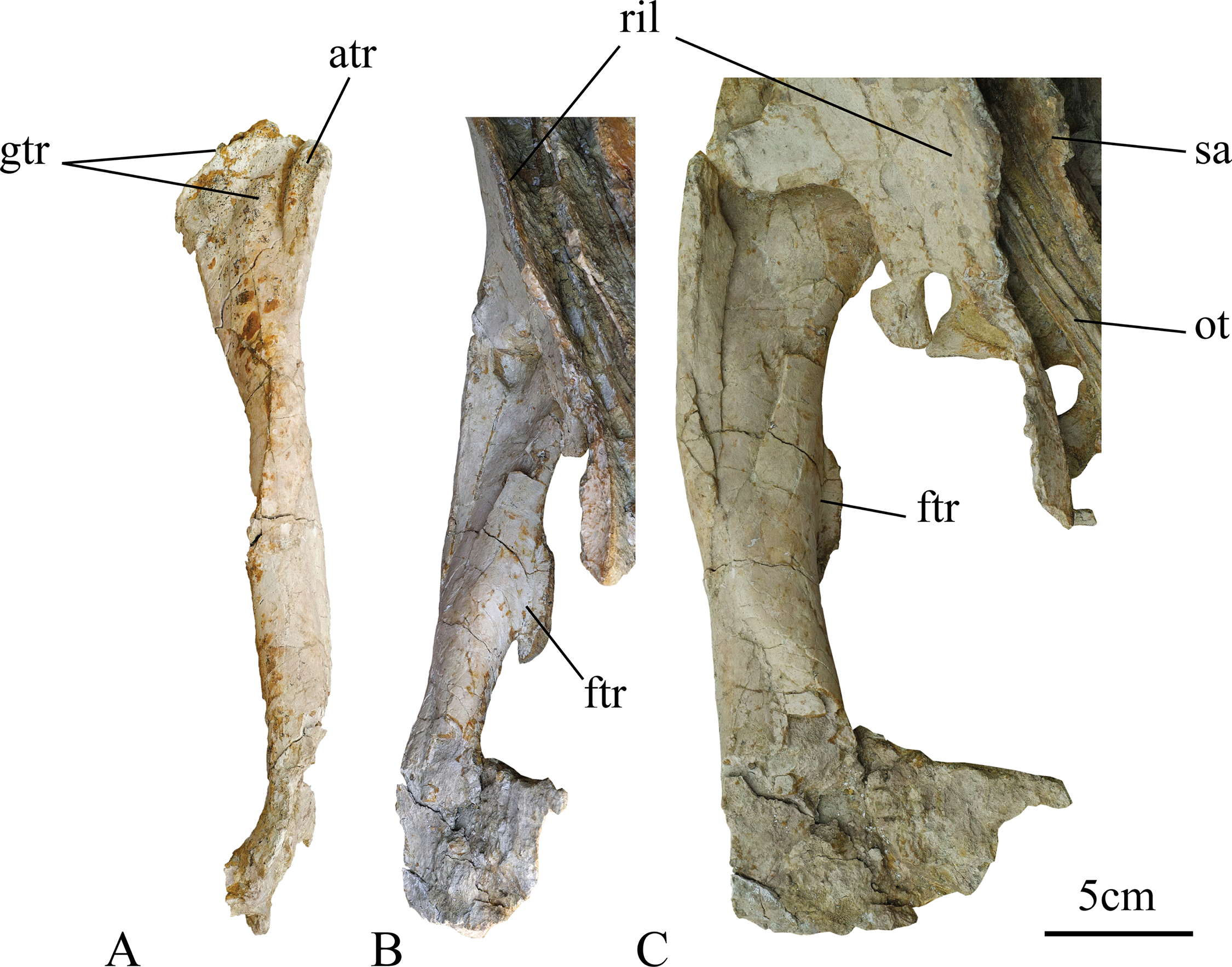
The thighbone

Ischioceratops is one of the few ceratopsian dinosaurs which is not known by the skull. The most peculiar traits are located in the ischium. With most relatives the ischium shaft has a constant curvature to the rear. Another characteristic of Ischioceratops is the presence of an elevation in the proximal part of its tail, which is present also in Protoceratops, Koreaceratops and in a more similar way in Montanoceratops and Cerasinops. The elevation forms a tail crest.

== Classification ==
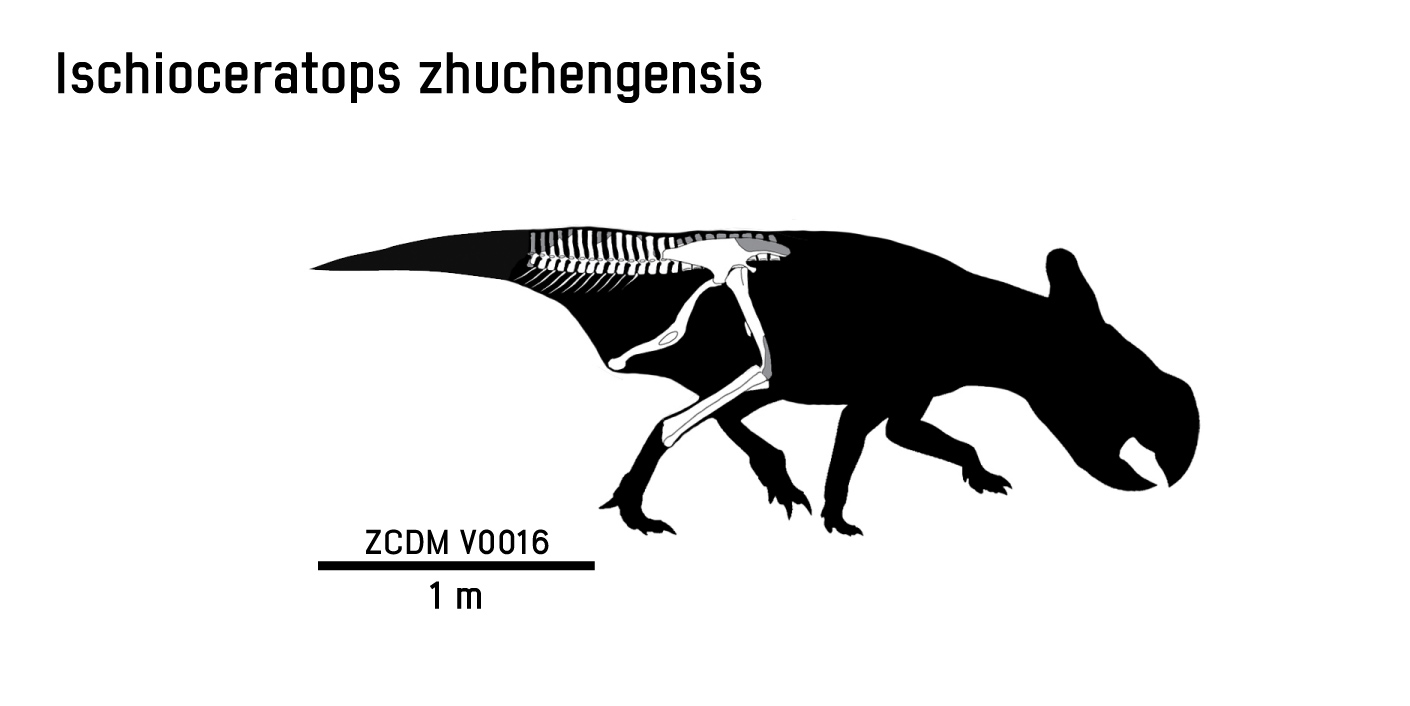
Skeletal reconstruction of the known bones

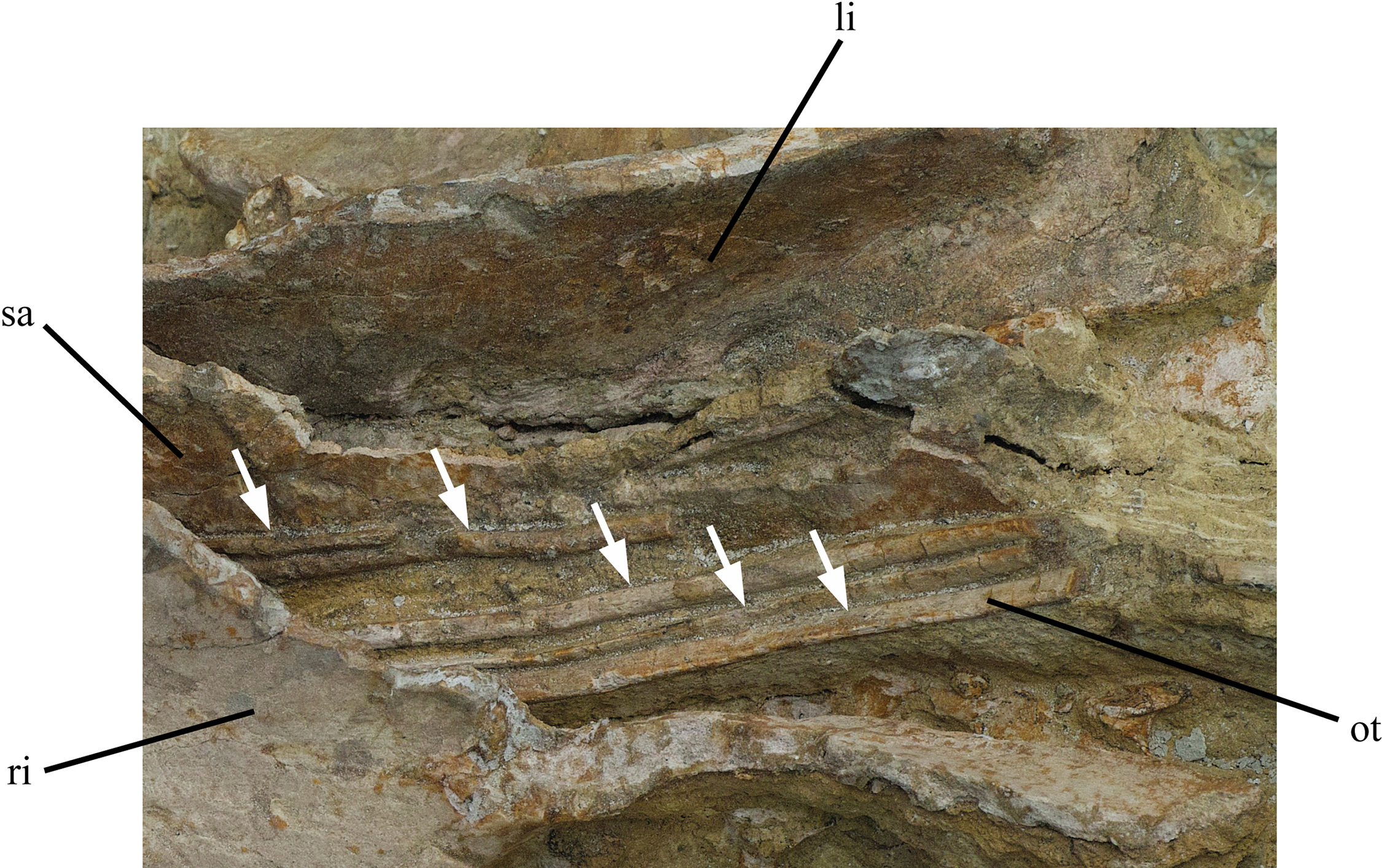
Ossified tendons

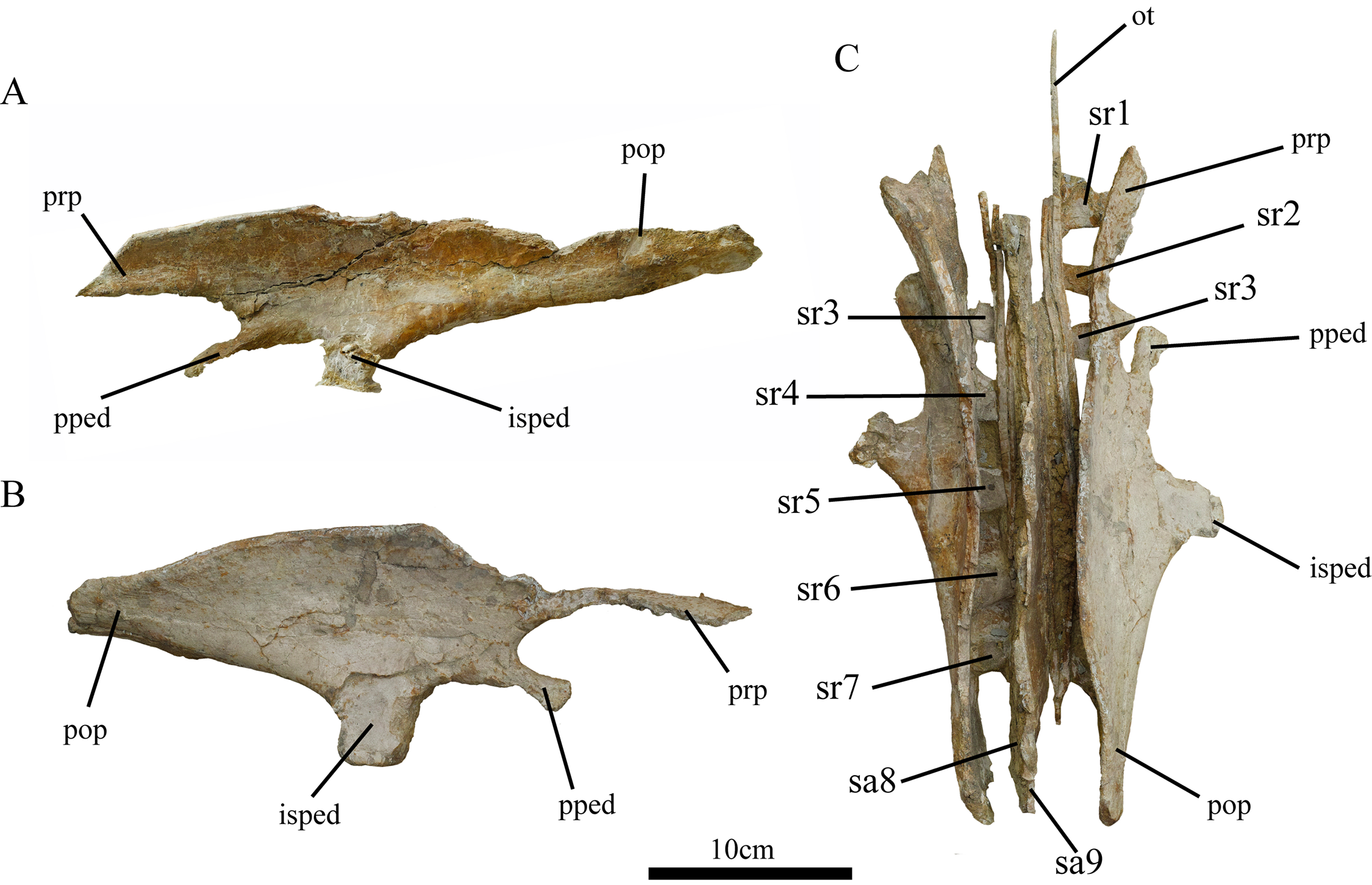
The pelvis

Phylogenetic analyzes confirmed Ischioceratops as a leptoceratopsid. Its closest relative taxon or sister species was Montanoceratops. The following cladogram is based on an analysis in the describing paper of 2015.

- Leptoceratopsidae
  - Asiaceratops
  - - Cerasinops
    - - - Montanoceratops
        - Ischioceratops
      - - Prenoceratops
        - - Leptoceratops
          - - Udanoceratops
            - - Zhuchengceratops
              - - Gryphoceratops
                - Unescoceratops
- - Graciliceratops
  - - Protoceratopsidae
      - Bagaceratops
      - - Lamaceratops
        - - Breviceratops
          - - Magnirostris
            - - Protoceratops hellenikorhinus
              - Protoceratops andrewsi
    - - Ajkaceratops
      - - Zuniceratops
        - Ceratopsidae

== See also ==
- Timeline of ceratopsian research
