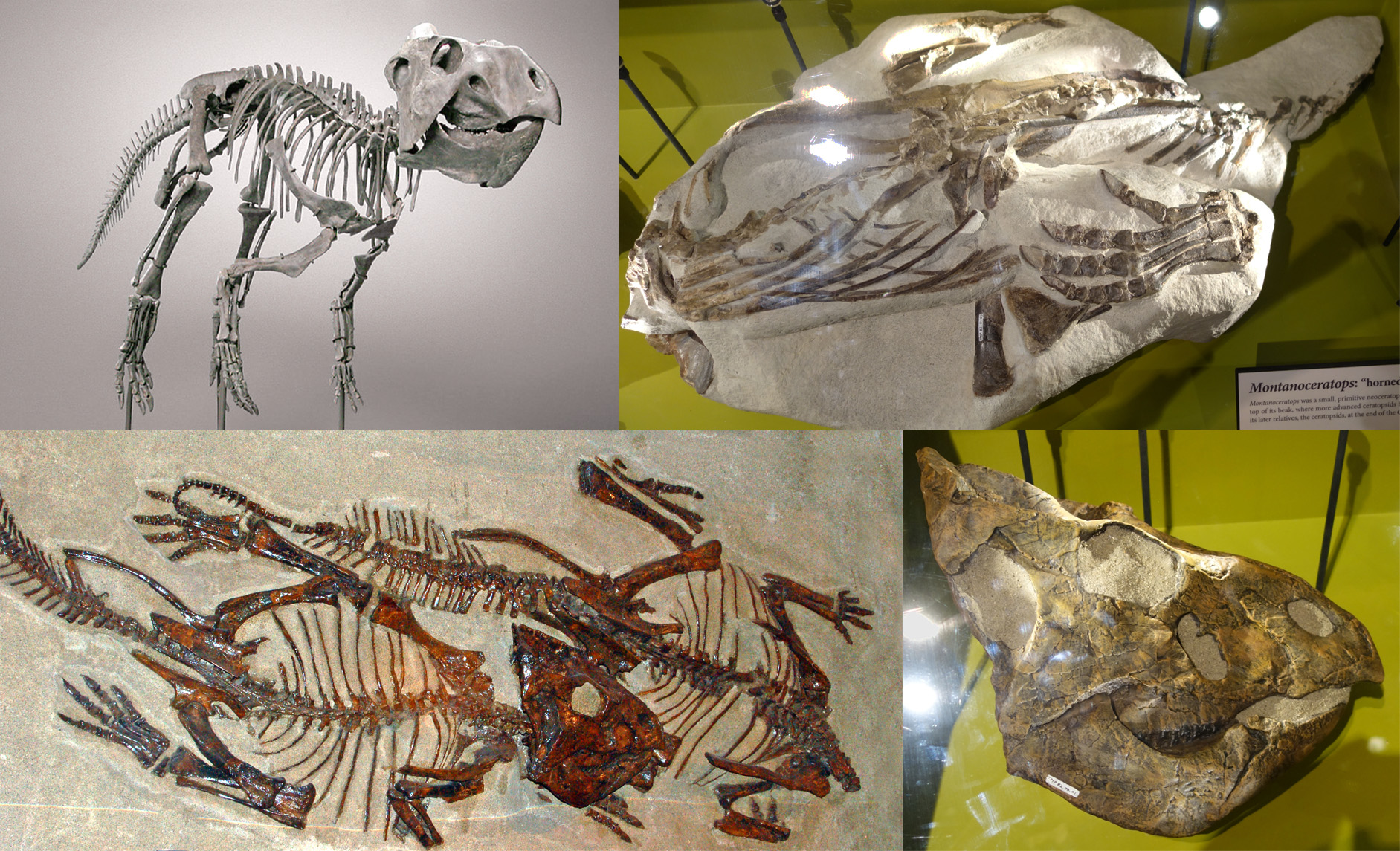
- Montage of three leptoceratopsids, clockwise from top left: Prenoceratops, Montanoceratops and Leptoceratops.

Scientific classification
- Kingdom: Animalia
- Phylum: Chordata
- Class: Reptilia
- Clade: Dinosauria
- Clade: †Ornithischia
- Clade: †Ceratopsia
- Clade: †Euceratopsia
- Family: †Leptoceratopsidae; Nopcsa, 1923

Type species
- †Leptoceratops gracilis Brown, 1914

Genera
- †Bainoceratops?; †Cerasinops; †Ferrisaurus; †Gremlin; †Gryphoceratops; †Ischioceratops; †Leptoceratops; †Montanoceratops; †Prenoceratops; †Udanoceratops; †Unescoceratops; †Zhuchengceratops

= Leptoceratopsidae =

Leptoceratopsids Temporal range: Late Cretaceous, 83–66 Ma

Extinct family of dinosaurs

Leptoceratopsidae is an extinct family of neoceratopsian dinosaurs from Asia, North America and possibly Europe. Leptoceratopsids resembled, and were closely related to, other neoceratopsians, such as the families Protoceratopsidae and Ceratopsidae, but they were more primitive and generally smaller.

== Phylogeny ==
Leptoceratopsidae was originally named by Franz Nopcsa von Felső-Szilvás in 1923 as a subfamily Leptoceratopsinae, and its type species is Leptoceratops gracilis. Mackovicky, in 2001, defined it as a stem-based taxon and a family consisting of Leptoceratops gracilis and all species closer to Leptoceratops than to Triceratops horridus.

All previously published neoceratopsian phylogenetic analyses were incorporated into the analysis of Eric M. Morschhauser and colleagues in 2019, along with all previously published diagnostic species excluding the incomplete juvenile Archaeoceratops yujingziensis and the problematic genera Bainoceratops, Lamaceratops, Platyceratops and Gobiceratops that are very closely related to and potentially synonymous with Bagaceratops. While there were many unresolved areas of the strict consensus, including all of Leptoceratopsidae, a single most parsimonious tree was found that was most consistent with the relative ages of the taxa included, which is shown below.

- Ceratopsia
  - Psittacosaurus
    - Psittacosaurus sinensis
    - Psittacosaurus mongoliensis
  - Neoceratopsia
    - - Chaoyangsauridae
        - Yinlong downsi
        - - Chaoyangsaurus youngi
          - - Hualianceratops wucaiwanensis
            - Xuanhuaceratops niei
    - - Stenopelix valdensis
      - - Liaoceratops yanzigouensis
        - - Archaeoceratops oshimai
          - - - Aquilops americanus
              - - Auroraceratops rugosus
                - Graciliceratops mongoliensis
            - - - Asiaceratops salsopaludalis
                - - Mosaiceratops azumai
                  - Yamaceratops dorngobiensis
              - - Leptoceratopsidae
                  - Helioceratops brachygnathus
                  - - Leptoceratops gracilis
                    - - - Ischioceratops zhuchengensis
                        - - Prenoceratops pieganensis
                          - - Udanoceratops tchizhovi
                            - Zhuchengceratops inexpectus
                      - - Koreaceratops hwaseongensis
                        - - Montanoceratops cerorhynchus
                          - - Cerasinops hodgskissi
                            - - Gryphoceratops morrisoni
                              - Unescoceratops kopelhusae
                - Coronosauria
                  - Protoceratopsidae
                    - - Bagaceratops rozhdestvenskyi
                      - Magnirostris dodsoni
                    - - Protoceratops
                        - Protoceratops hellenikorhinus
                        - Protoceratops andrewsi
                  - Ceratopsoidea
                    - Ajkaceratops kozmai
                    - - Zuniceratops christopheri
                      - - Turanoceratops tardabilis
                        - - Diabloceratops eatoni
                          - Ceratopsidae

== Palaeobiogeography ==
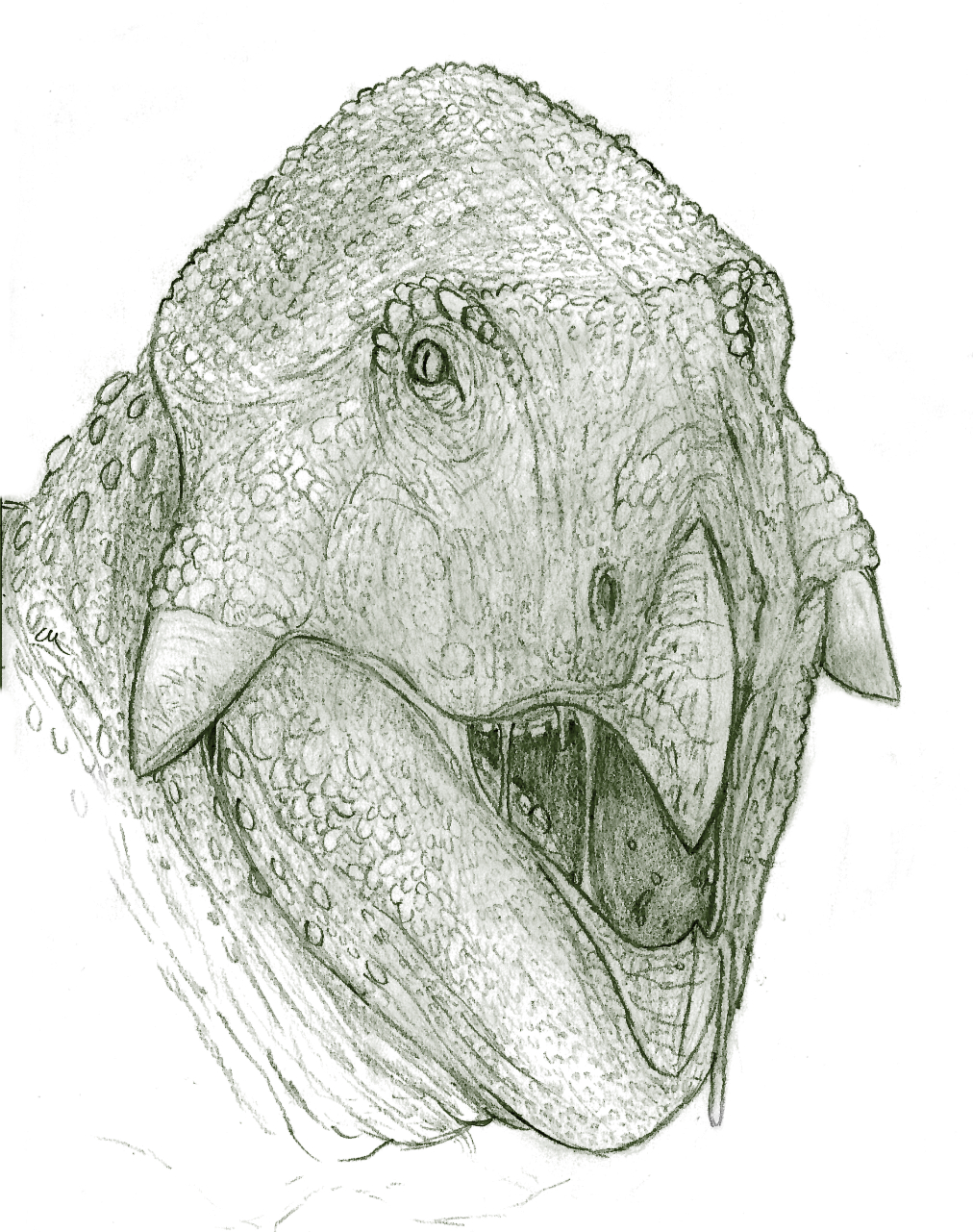
Life reconstruction of a leptoceratopsid

Definitive leptoceratopsids lived in Asia and Western North America during the Late Cretaceous around 83-66 million years ago. However, material referred to leptoceratopsids from the early Campanian of North Carolina and Sweden possibly extends their geographic range into Eastern North America and Europe. A possible leptoceratopsid ulna named Serendipaceratops has been found in Australia, but this taxon is considered a nomen dubium due to the fragmentary holotype which cannot be confidently referred to any ornithischian group, though it might possibly belong to an ankylosaur instead.

Leptoceratopsids range in age from Gryphoceratops, of the late Santonian, to Leptoceratops, right at the end of the Cretaceous in the late Maastrichtian. Gryphoceratops is the first definitive record of Santonian leptoceratopsid. It was named based on a partial left dentary from Alberta, Canada. Gryphoceratops represents the oldest known leptoceratopsid and probably the smallest adult ceratopsian known from North America.

Leptoceratopsids are known from Eastern North America by a partial maxilla dated to the early Campanian of North Carolina, whilst the European material referred to Leptoceratopsidae consists of isolated teeth and vertebrae from the early Campanian of Sweden. The former represents the first known ceratopsian from Eastern North America, and its specialised maxillary anatomy supports the hypothesis that Appalachia was isolated from Western Europe and Laramidia for an extended period during the Late Cretaceous, resulting in an endemic Late Cretaceous fauna. The shared presence of leptoceratopsids in Appalachia and Western Europe has implications for their biogeographic dispersal, suggesting the possibility that leptoceratopsids entered Appalachia through either Western Europe or Laramidia; however, it is also possible that the European leptoceratopsids also represented a distinct endemic assemblage, as the Fennoscandian Shield was also an isolated landmass during the Late Cretaceous.

== See also ==
- Timeline of ceratopsian research
