= David C. Evans (paleontologist) =

Canadian palaeontologist and evolutionary biologist

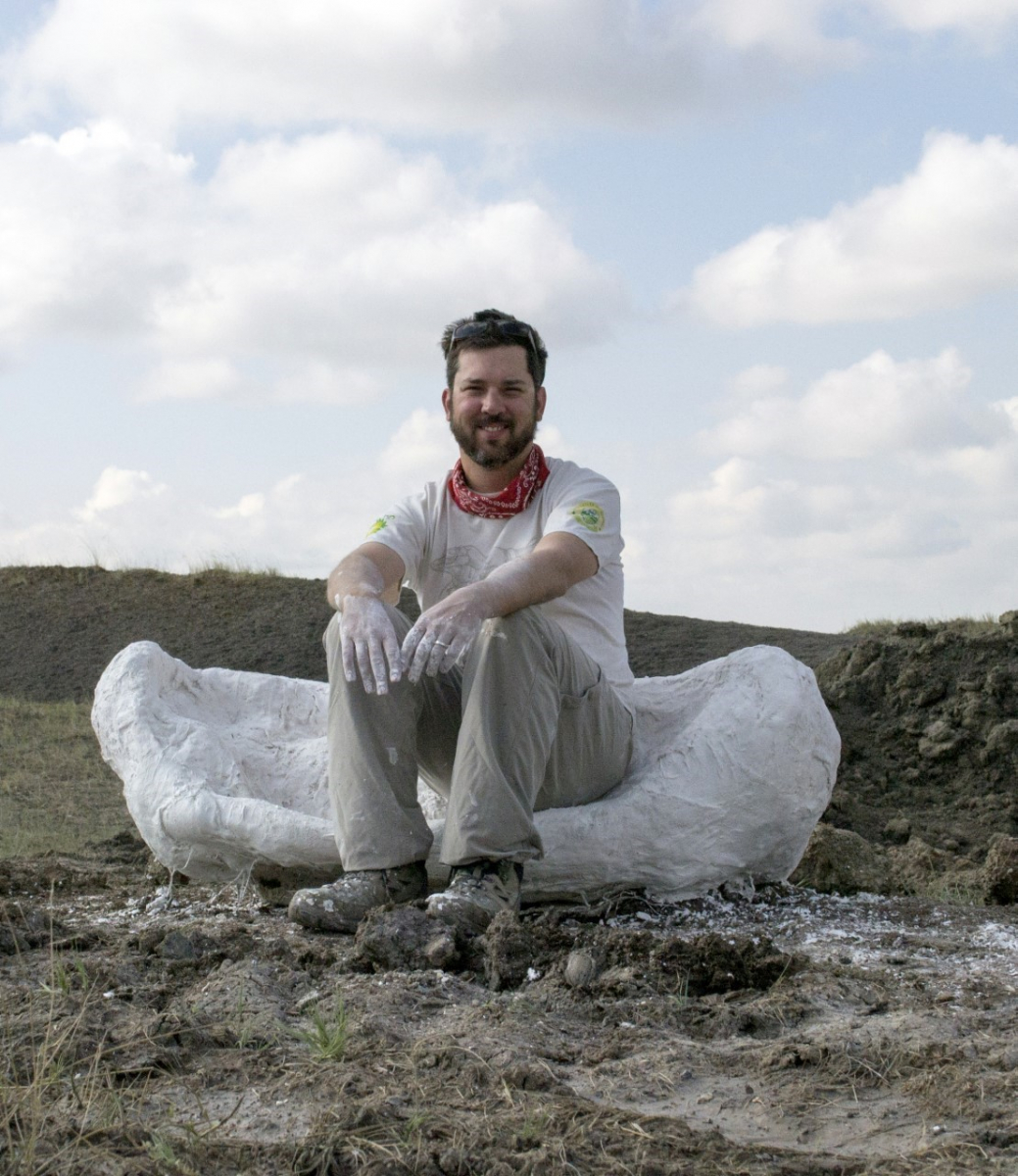
- David C. Evans in 2020, during fieldwork
- Born: 1980 (age 45–46); Ontario, Canada
- Education: University of British Columbia (BSc, 2003); University of Toronto (PhD, 2007)
- Scientific career
- Fields: Paleontology
- Workplaces: University of Toronto
- Thesis: Ontogeny and evolution of lambeosaurine dinosaurs (Ornithischia: Hadrosauridae) (2007)
- Doctoral advisor: Robert R. Reisz

David Christopher Evans (born 1980) is a Canadian palaeontologist and evolutionary biologist who specializes in the evolution and paleobiology of Cretaceous dinosaurs in western North America. He received his B.Sc. from the University of British Columbia and his Ph.D. from the University of Toronto. He is a fellow of the Royal Canadian Geographical Society (RCGS) and a member of the Royal Society of Canada (The College of New Scholars, Artists and Scientists) and currently serves as the Senior Curator and Temerty Chair of Vertebrate Paleontology at the Royal Ontario Museum in Toronto, Canada. He is also a faculty member in the Department of Ecology & Evolutionary Biology at the University of Toronto. Evans is particularly renowned for his work on the paleobiology of hadrosaur ("duck-billed") dinosaurs and has conducted international research on a wide variety of paleontological topics.

== Biography ==
David Evans was born in Ontario and raised in Kelowna, British Columbia. He received his B.Sc. from the Integrated Sciences Program of the University of British Columbia in 2003, where he completed an undergraduate thesis on skull growth and variation in the hadrosaur Corythosaurus. Over the course of his undergraduate degree, Evans worked as a field technician at the Royal Tyrell Museum of Palaeontology in Drumheller. He then completed his Ph.D. in 2007 under the supervision of Canadian paleontologist Robert Reisz at the University of Toronto in the Department of Ecology & Evolutionary Biology on development and phylogenetic relationships of lambeosaurine hadrosaurs (dissertation title: "Ontogeny and evolution of lambeosaurine dinosaurs (Ornithischia: Hadrosauridae)."). Following the completion of his Ph.D., Evans was hired as a curator by the Royal Ontario Museum in Toronto, Canada, where he currently serves as the Temerty Chair in Vertebrate Palaeontology. He has been part of the faculty in the Department of Ecology and Evolutionary Biology at the University of Toronto since 2007 and currently holds the rank of Associate Professor. He is also the owner of a male Shiba Inu named Doug.

== Academic contributions ==
David Evans' research focuses primarily on the evolution and paleobiology of Late Cretaceous dinosaurs, particularly in North American ecosystems. He has published extensively on various aspects of hadrosaurs, following his undergraduate and doctoral dissertations, including phylogenetics, development, biostratigraphy, pathology, biomechanics, and anatomy. He has published more than 80 peer-reviewed articles and has several publications in leading scientific journals, including Biological Reviews, Current Biology, Methods in Ecology and Evolution, Nature Communications, Proceedings of the National Academy of Sciences, Proceedings of the Royal Society B: Biological Sciences, and Science, and has contributed book chapters to several edited volumes. Evans' current research interests focus primarily on the vast majority of the well-known Late Cretaceous dinosaur clades found in western North America, and he maintains active fieldwork programs in Alberta and Montana. He has also conducted research on dinosaur material from Mongolia and tetrapod-bearing deposits in Sudan. Evans has also been involved with both fieldwork and research of the Early Jurassic sauropodomorph Massospondylus from South Africa and has conducted research on intraspecific combat in ankylosaurid dinosaurs, pelycosaurian-grade Permian synapsids, Permian temnospondyls, the iconic Pleistocene felid Smilodon, and choristoderes.

Evans has been a part of various teams that have named over a dozen new genera or species of dinosaurs. New ceratopsians named by Evans and colleagues include Xenoceratops foremostensis Ryan, Evans, & Shepherd, 2012; Gryphoceratops morrisoni Ryan, Evans, Currie, Brown, & Brinkman, 2012; Unescoceratops koppelhusi Ryan, Evans, Currie, Brown, & Brinkman, 2012; Mercuriceratops gemini Ryan, Evans, Loewen, & Currie, 2014; Wendiceratops pinhorensis Evans & Ryan, 2015; Spiclypeus shipporum Mallon, Ott, Larson, Iuliano, & Evans, 2016; Ferrisaurus sustutensis Arbour & Evans, 2019; Stellasaurus ancellae Wilson, Ryan & Evans, 2020; and Lokiceratops rangiformis Loewen et al., 2024. Evans was also involved in the naming of the ornithopods Albertadromeus syntarsus Brown, Evans, Ryan, & Russell, 2013; Plesiohadros djadokhtaensis Tsogtbaatar, Weishampel, Evans, & Watabe, 2014; Gobihadros mongoliensis Tsogtbaatar, Weishampel, Evans, & Watabe, 2019; and Plesiolophus warnerensis McFeeters, Evans, Ryan, & Maddin, 2026; the pachycephalosaurians Acrotholus audeti Evans, Schott, Larson, Brown, & Ryan, 2013; and Foraminacephale brevis Schott & Evans, 2016; the dromaeosaurid Acheroraptor temertyorum Evans, Currie, & Larson, 2013; the ankylosaurid Zuul crurivastator Arbour & Evans, 2017; the troodontid Albertavenator curriei Evans, Cullen, Larson, & Rego, 2017; and Sinocephale bexelli Evans, Brown, You, & Campione, 2021. Evans has also been involved with the naming of various new non-dinosaurian taxa, such as the Devonian onychodontiform fish Onychodus eriensis Mann, Rudkin, Evans, & Laflamme, 2017; the Carboniferous parareptile Erpetonyx arsenaultorum Modesto, Scott, MacDougall, Sues, Evans, & Reisz, 2015; the Cretaceous baenid turtle Neurankylus lithographicus Larson, Longrich, Evans, & Ryan, 2013; and the Cretaceous dyrosaurid crocodilian Brachiosuchus kababishensis Salih, Evans, Bussert, Klein & Müller, 2021.

As a professor at the University of Toronto, Evans supervises numerous graduate students in the Department of Ecology & Evolutionary Biology. Former M.Sc. students include Arjan Mann (National Museum of Natural History); Ryan Schott (National Museum of Natural History); Chris McGarrity (Field Museum); Collin Van Buren (Ohio State University); and Denise Maranga. Former Ph.D. students include Nicolas Campione (University of New England); Caleb Brown (Royal Tyrell Museum); Kirstin Brink (University of Manitoba); Thomas Cullen (Auburn University); Mateusz Wosik (Misericordia University), Kentaro Chiba (Okayama University of Science), and D. Cary Woodruff (Frost Museum of Science). Evans also serves on the editorial board of several academic journals, including FACETS and Biology Letters, and has previously served as an editor at PLOS ONE.

== Outreach and public media ==
Evans has been featured in numerous documentaries, including the History Channel's 2015 documentary Dino Hunt Canada and various episodes of Daily Planet and radio and TV interviews, as well as appeared in the TVOKids shows Now You Know, Canada Crew, Dino Dana & Dino Dan: Trek's Adventures. He has also appeared in Dino Dana: The Movie. On top of that, he has helped to develop several exhibits, including the traveling "Ultimate Dinosaurs" exhibit in 2012, the permanent James and Louise Temerty Galleries of the Age of Dinosaurs at the Royal Ontario Museum (ROM), and temporary exhibits at the ROM, including "Dinosaur Eggs & Babies: Remarkable Fossils from South Africa" (2014) and "Zuul, Life of an Armoured Dinosaur" (2018-2019). Evans has also served on numerous committees of the Society of Vertebrate Paleontology and the Canadian Society of Vertebrate Paleontology.
