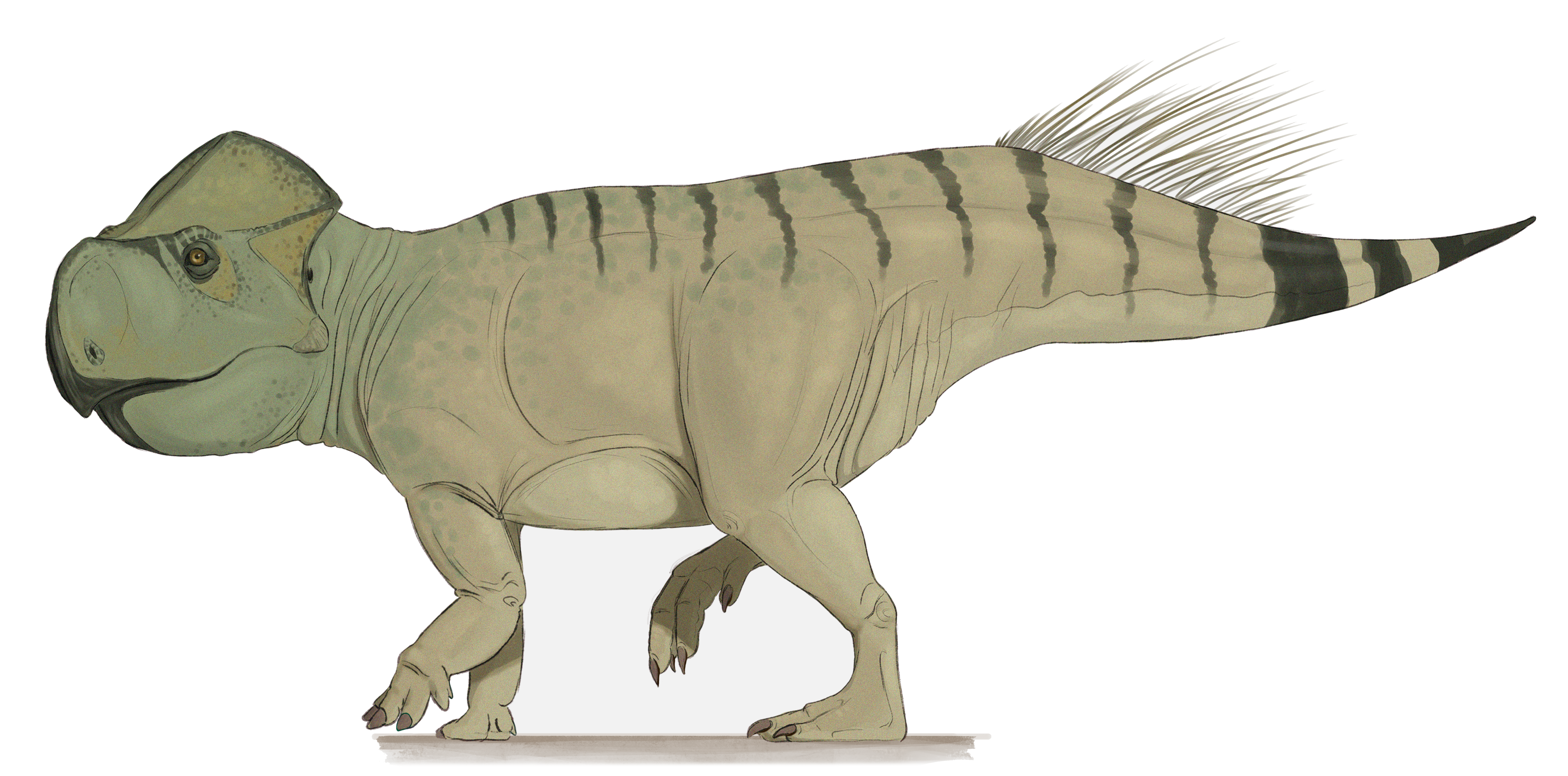
- Life reconstruction

Scientific classification
- Kingdom: Animalia
- Phylum: Chordata
- Class: Reptilia
- Clade: Dinosauria
- Clade: †Ornithischia
- Clade: †Ceratopsia
- Family: †Leptoceratopsidae
- Genus: †Gryphoceratops; Ryan et al., 2012
- Species: †G. morrisoni

Binomial name
- †Gryphoceratops morrisoni Ryan et al., 2012

= Gryphoceratops =

Gryphoceratops Temporal range: Late Cretaceous, 83 Ma

Genus of reptiles (fossil)

Gryphoceratops is an extinct genus of leptoceratopsid ceratopsian dinosaur known from the Late Cretaceous of Alberta, southern Canada.

== Discovery ==
Gryphoceratops is known only from the holotype ROM 56635, a partial right dentary. The holotype was collected in the northwest corner of Dinosaur Provincial Park, from bonebed 55 of the Milk River Formation, dating to the late Santonian stage of the middle Late Cretaceous period, about 83 million years ago. Gryphoceratops was first named by Michael J. Ryan, David C. Evans, Philip J. Currie, Caleb M. Brown and Don Brinkman in 2012 and the type species is Gryphoceratops morrisoni. The genus name means "griffin horned face", as a reference to the beaked head, and the species name honors Ian Morrison, who prepared the holotype specimen.

== Classification ==
Gryphoceratops represents the oldest-known leptoceratopsid. However, a cladistic analysis found it to be one of the most advanced leptoceratopsids. Additionally, the holotype probably represents the smallest adult ceratopsian known from North America.

The cladogram below represents the cladistic relationship of Gryphoceratops compared to other leptoceratopsids.

- Leptoceratopsidae
  - Asiaceratops
  - - Montanoceratops
    - Ischioceratops
    - - Prenoceratops
      - - Leptoceratops
        - - Udanoceratops
          - - Zhuchengceratops
            - - Unescoceratops
              - Gryphoceratops

== See also ==
- Timeline of ceratopsian research
