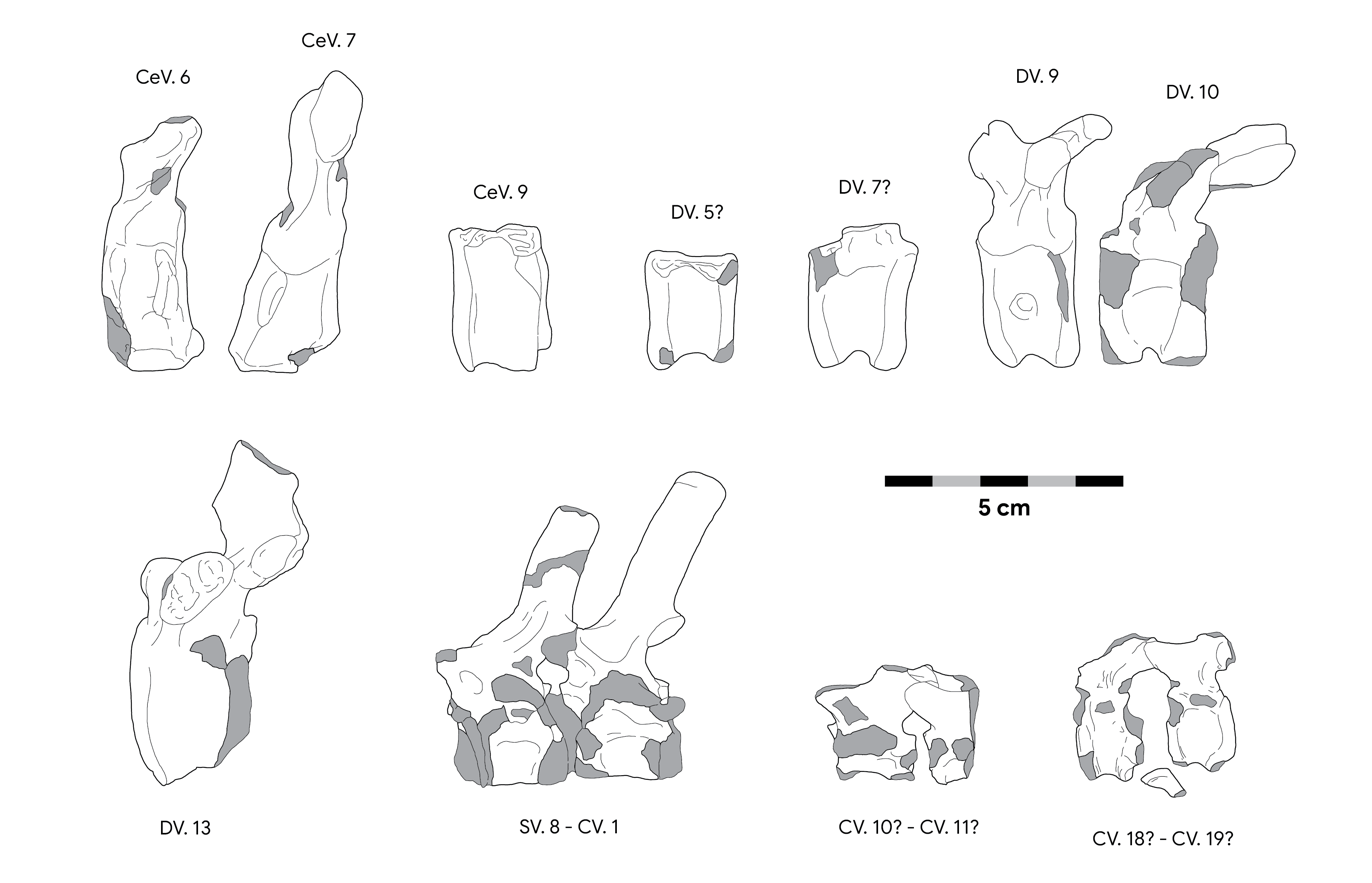
- Known material from the holotype

Scientific classification
- Kingdom: Animalia
- Phylum: Chordata
- Class: Reptilia
- Clade: Dinosauria
- Clade: †Ornithischia
- Clade: †Ceratopsia
- Clade: †Euceratopsia
- Genus: †Bainoceratops; Tereshchenko & Afliafanov, 2003
- Species: †B. efremovi

Binomial name
- †Bainoceratops efremovi Tereshchenko & Aflifanov, 2003

= Bainoceratops =

Bainoceratops Temporal range: Late Cretaceous, ~75–71 Ma

Extinct genus of dinosaurs

Bainoceratops (meaning "mountain horned face", after the type locality, Bayn Dzak) is a genus of possibly dubious ceratopsian dinosaur from the late Campanian in the Late Cretaceous. The type species is B. efremovi and its fossils were found in southern Mongolia in the Djadochta Formation.

== History ==
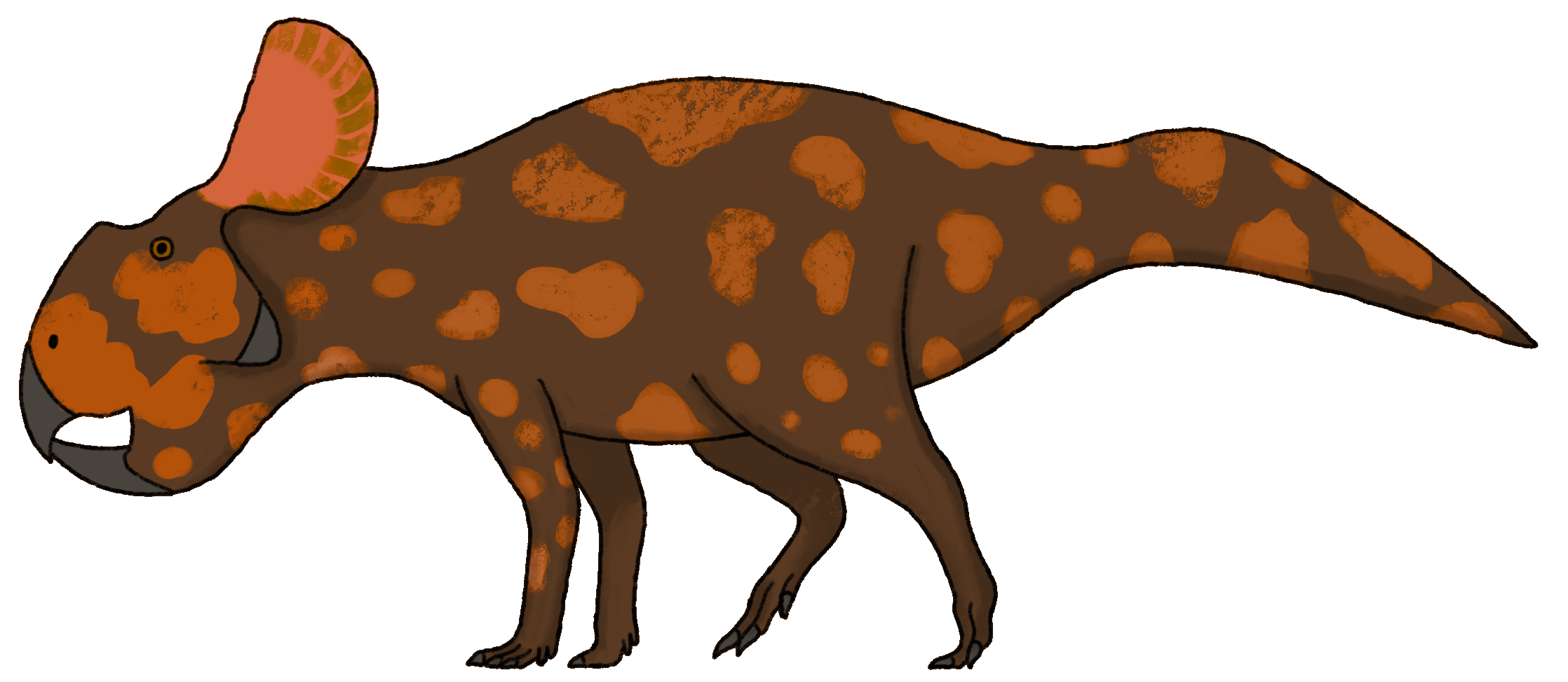
Speculative life restoration based on Protoceratops

Viktor Tereshchenko and Vladimir R. Alifanov in 2003 named Bainoceratops efremovi based on a few dorsal (back) vertebrae that were stated to differ from those of Protoceratops, suggesting a closer relationship with Udanoceratops. In 2006 North American paleontologists Peter Makovicky and Mark A. Norell suggested that Bainoceratops may be synonymous with Protoceratops as most of the traits used to separate the former from the latter have been reported from other ceratopsians including Protoceratops itself, and they are more likely to fall within the wide intraspecific variation range of the concurring P. andrewsi. In 2007, in their description of Cerasinops, authors Brenda J. Chinnery and John R. Horner determined Bainoceratops and other dubious genera to be either a variant or immature specimen of other well-known genera. Based on this reasoning, they excluded Bainoceratops from their phylogenetic analysis. Morschhauser and team in their 2018 reassessment of Auroraceratops also considered Bainoceratops to represent a problematic taxon and excluded it from their large-scale ceratopsian phylogenetic analysis, pending further revision.

== See also ==
- Timeline of ceratopsian research
