= Unescoceratops =

Unescoceratops Temporal range: Late Cretaceous, 76.5–75 Ma

Scientific classification
- Domain: Eukaryota
- Kingdom: Animalia
- Phylum: Chordata
- Clade: Dinosauria
- Clade: †Ornithischia
- Family: †Leptoceratopsidae
- Genus: †Unescoceratops; Ryan et al., 2012
- Species: †U. koppelhusae

Binomial name
- †Unescoceratops koppelhusae Ryan et al., 2012

Extinct genus of dinosaurs

Unescoceratops is a genus of leptoceratopsid ceratopsian dinosaurs known from the Late Cretaceous of Alberta, southern Canada. It contains a single species, Unescoceratops koppelhusae.

== Discovery ==
Unescoceratops is known only from the holotype specimen TMP 95.12.6, a partial left dentary. The fossil was collected in 1995 in the Black Coulee locality (formerly Deadhorse Coulee), near the Writing-on-Stone Provincial Park, from the Dinosaur Park Formation, dating to the late Campanian stage of the Late Cretaceous period, about 76.5-75 million years ago. The specimen was regarded as too incomplete to identify, and was shelved for several years. It was believed to be a Leptoceratops specimen at the time. A cladistic analysis done by Michael Ryan (of The Cleveland Museum of Natural History) and David Evans (of the Royal Ontario Museum) found it to be among the most advanced leptoceratopsid genera.

== Description ==
Unescoceratops is thought to have been between one and two meters long and less than 91 kilograms. Its teeth were the roundest of all leptoceratopsids.

Mallon et al. (2013) examined herbivore coexistence on the island continent of Laramidia, during the Late Cretaceous. It was concluded that small ornithischians like Unescoceratops were generally restricted to feeding on vegetation at, or below the height of 1 meter.

== Etymology ==
The genus Unescoceratops was first described by Michael J. Ryan, David C. Evans, Philip J. Currie, Caleb M. Brown and Don Brinkman in 2012 (though it had been published earlier by Ryan and Currie in 1995 with no name) and the type species is Unescoceratops koppelhusae. The generic name means "UNESCO horned face", in reference to the fossil being found in an area designated as a World Heritage Site by the organization. "'Dinosaurprovincialparkaceratops' was too long," explained Ryan. The specific epithet is named after Currie's wife, palynologist Eva Koppelhus.

== Classification ==
Unescoceratops has been classified as a leptoceratopsid and the sister taxa to Gryphoceratops, which was described in the same paper. These two are the most derived leptoceratopsids known, despite Gryphoceratops also being the oldest leptoceratopsid.

The cladogram below represents the cladistic relationship of Unescoceratops compared to other leptoceratopsids as reconstructed from the phylogenetic analysis.

- Leptoceratopsidae
  - Asiaceratops
  - - Montanoceratops
    - Ischioceratops
    - - Prenoceratops
      - - Leptoceratops
        - - Udanoceratops
          - - Zhuchengceratops
            - - Unescoceratops
              - Gryphoceratops

== See also ==
- Timeline of ceratopsian research
