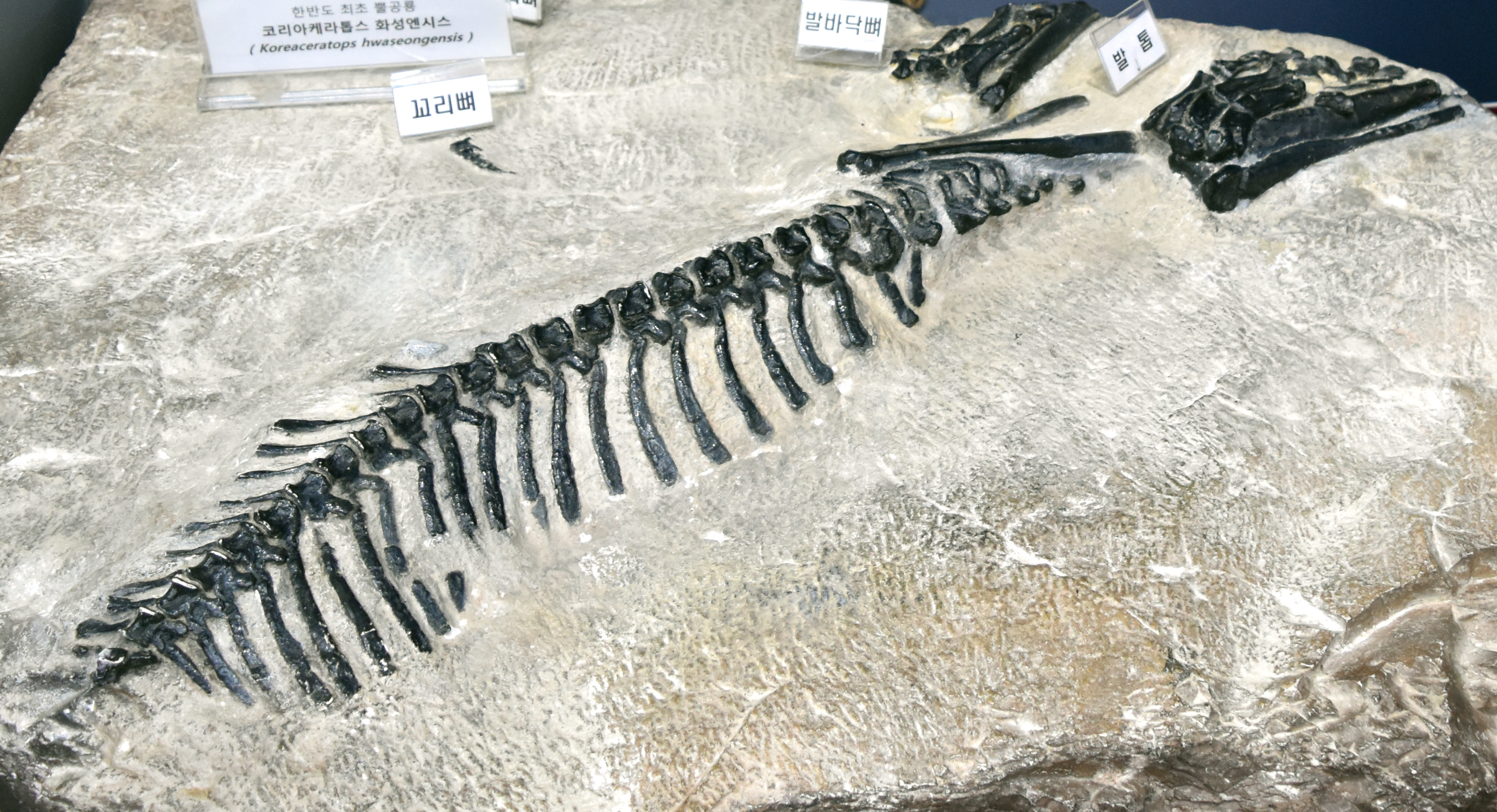
- Holotype specimen

Scientific classification
- Kingdom: Animalia
- Phylum: Chordata
- Class: Reptilia
- Clade: Dinosauria
- Clade: †Ornithischia
- Clade: †Ceratopsia
- Clade: †Neoceratopsia
- Genus: †Koreaceratops; Lee, Ryan & Kobayashi, 2011
- Species: †K. hwaseongensis

Binomial name
- †Koreaceratops hwaseongensis Lee, Ryan & Kobayashi, 2011

= Koreaceratops =

Koreaceratops Temporal range: Early Cretaceous, Albian 103.5–102.5 Ma

Extinct genus of dinosaurs

Koreaceratops (lit. 'Korean horned face') is a genus of basal ceratopsian dinosaur discovered in Albian-aged (Early Cretaceous) rocks of South Korea.

== Discovery ==
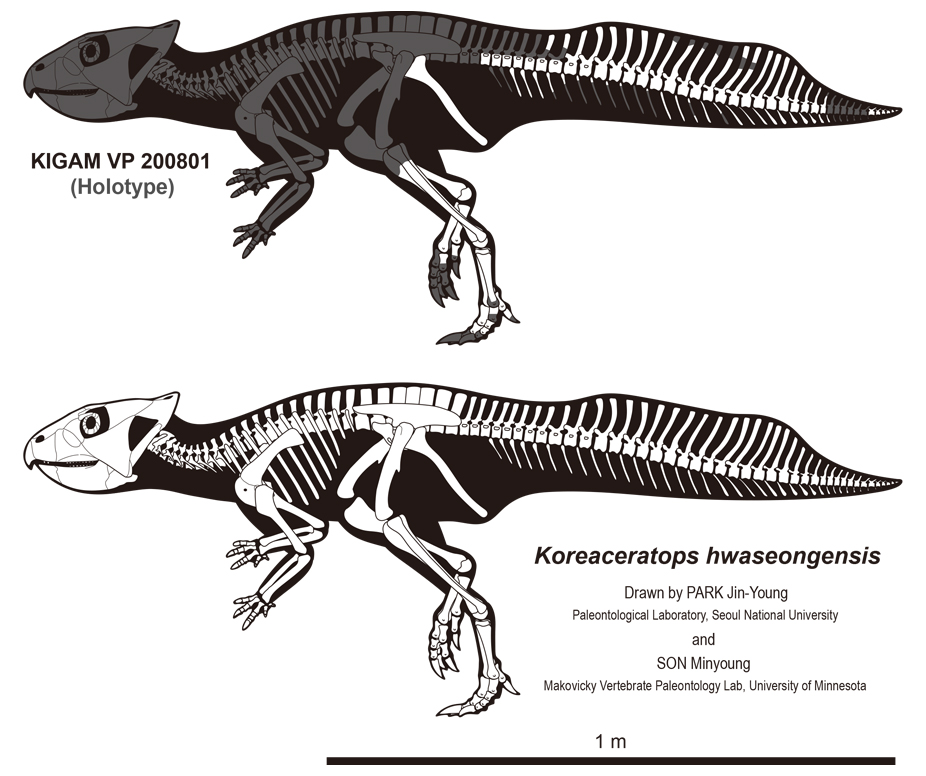
Skeletal diagram

It is based on KIGAM VP 200801, an articulated series of 36 caudal vertebrae associated with partial hind limbs and ischia. This specimen was found in a sandstone block that had been incorporated into the Tando seawall at Hwaseong City; the way the specimen is cut off suggests that more of it was present before quarrying. The seawall was built in 1994, and the bones were first brought to the attention of paleontologists in 2008, after a public official noticed them. The type specimen came from the Albian-aged Tando beds. Koreaceratops was described by Yuong-Nam Lee and colleagues in 2011. The genus name is a combination of "Korea" and the Greek κέρας (keras) meaning 'horn' and ὄψις (opsis) meaning 'face'. The type species is K. hwaseongensis, named after Hwaseong City.

== Classification ==
Koreaceratops is notable for the tall neural spines on its caudal vertebrae, and for the structure of its astragalus. In some of the distal caudal vertebrae, the neural spines are over five times the height of the vertebral centra to which they attach. Lee et al. noted that several other ceratopsians also had tall neural spines on their caudals. As this trait appears in several branches of ceratopsians, Lee et al. postulated that the feature was independently evolved, perhaps as an adaptation for swimming. Lee et al. performed a phylogenetic analysis and found Koreaceratops to be positioned between Archaeoceratops and more derived ceratopsians. A 2022 study however, suggests it is closer to Protoceratops than to earlier animals like Psittacosaurus and Archaeoceratops. Some researchers have removed Koreaceratops from phylogenetic analyses due to the lack of skull material from the type specimen which results in a complicated resolution within neoceratopsians.

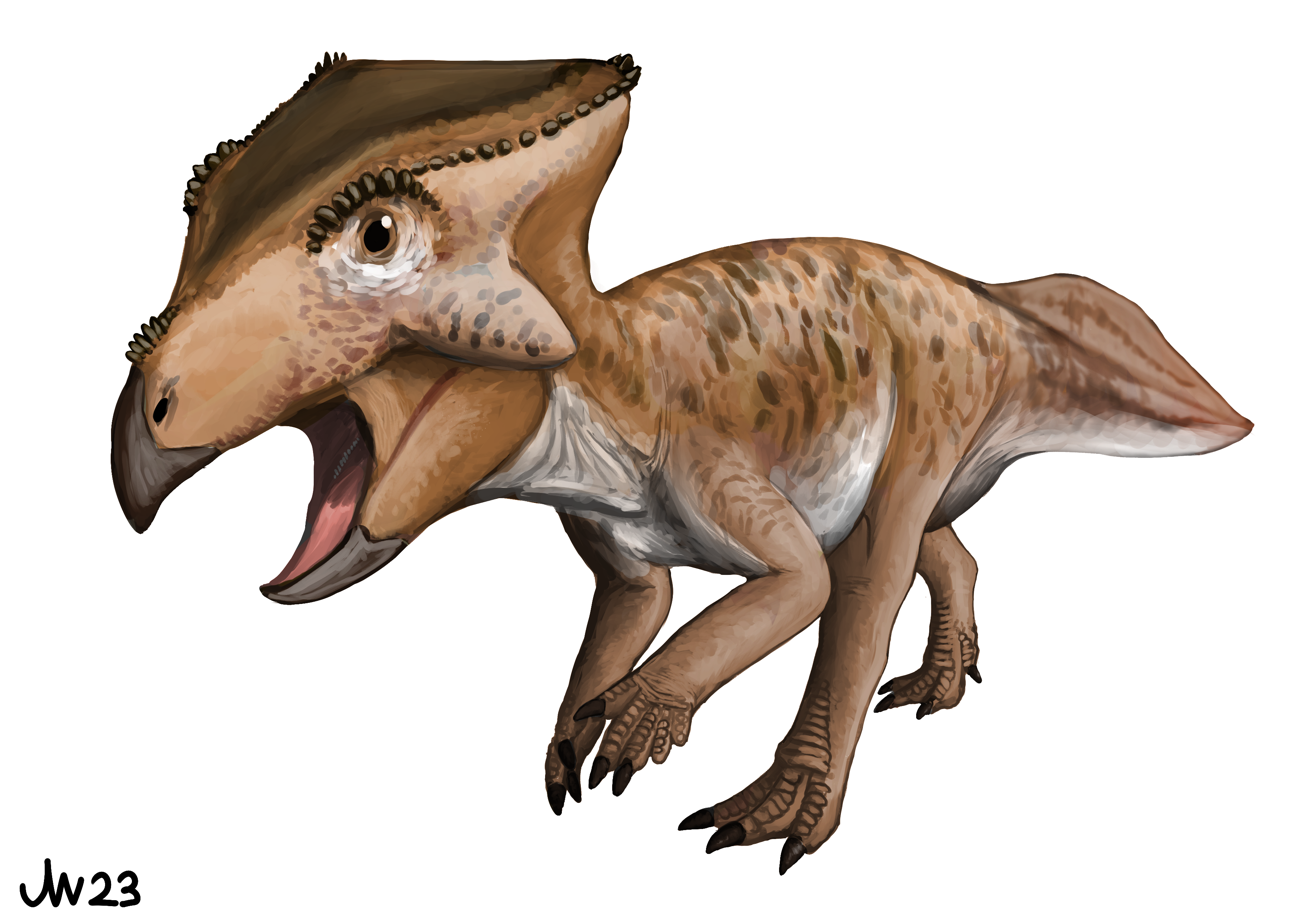
Life reconstruction of Koreaceratops

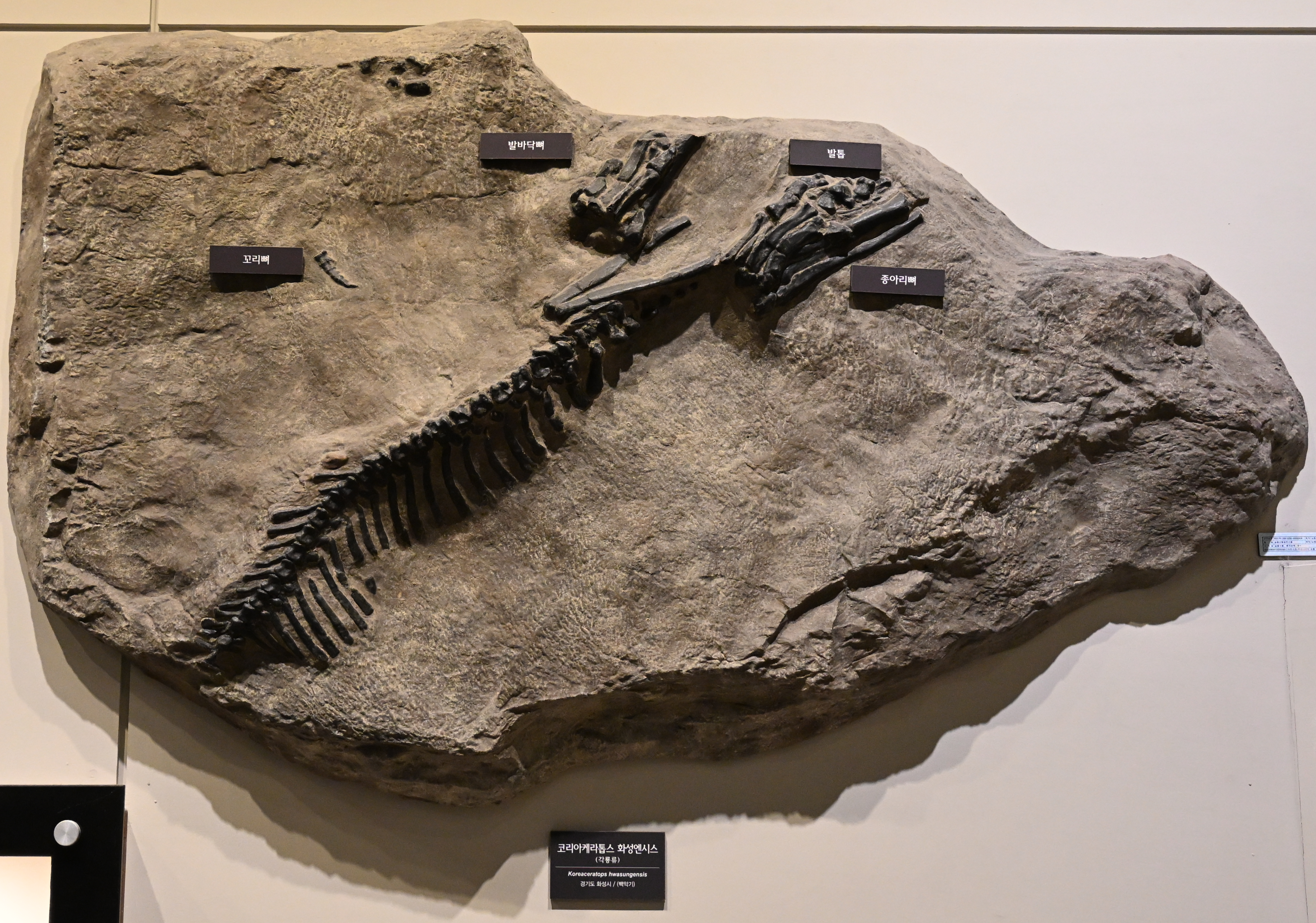
Fossil replica

== Paleobiology ==
An examination of the bone histology of Koreaceratops published in 2022 suggests that the type specimen was roughly eight years old when it died and did not reach physical or sexual maturity. The same study suggests that Koreaceratops lived in a semiarid environment, and that microbial erosion is responsible for the poor preservation of its distinguishing features. Thomas Holtz gave a length estimate of 1.3 m (4.3 ft) for this specimen.

== See also ==
- Timeline of ceratopsian research
- Koreanosaurus
