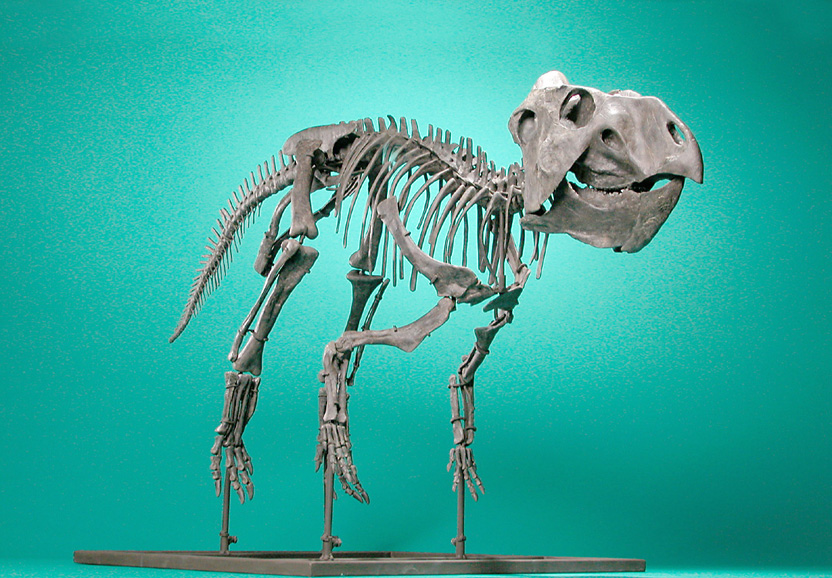
- Cast of a fossil skeleton, The Children's Museum of Indianapolis

Scientific classification
- Domain: Eukaryota
- Kingdom: Animalia
- Phylum: Chordata
- Clade: Dinosauria
- Clade: †Ornithischia
- Family: †Leptoceratopsidae
- Genus: †Prenoceratops; Chinnery, 2004
- Species: †P. pieganensis

Binomial name
- †Prenoceratops pieganensis Chinnery, 2004

= Prenoceratops =

Prenoceratops Temporal range: Late Cretaceous 74.3 Ma

Genus of reptiles (fossil)

Prenoceratops, (meaning 'bent or prone-horned face' and derived from Greek prene-/πρηνη- meaning 'bent forwards' or 'prone', cerat-/κερατ- meaning 'horn' and -ops/ωψ meaning 'face') is a genus of herbivorous ceratopsian dinosaur from the Late Cretaceous Period. It was a relatively small dinosaur, reaching 1.3 m (4.3 ft) in length and 20 kg (44 lb) in body mass. Its fossils have been found in the upper Two Medicine Formation in the present-day U.S. state of Montana, in Campanian age rock layers that have been dated to 74.3 million years ago. Fossils were also found in the Oldman Formation in the modern day Canadian province of Alberta, dating to around 77 million years ago.

== Discovery and species ==
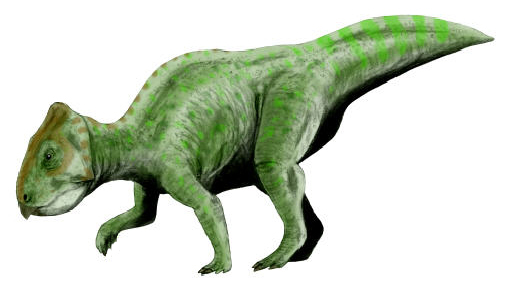
Restoration

Prenoceratops was first discovered on a Blackfeet reservation in Pondera County, Montana in layers coming from the Campanian Two Medicine Formation. The locality at which Prenoceratops was found was filled with many disassociated fossil elements of many individuals, known as a bonebed, though only the skull material has been described as of 2022. The holotype was one of the few associated specimens, including a surrangular fused with an articular, the specimen is designated as TCM 2003.1.1. Prenoceratops was later described by Brenda J. Chinnery in 2004, though the taxon has been little noticed since. It is unusual in that it is the only basal neoceratopsian known from a bonebed and the sheer number of elements.

An isolated right frontal from the Oldman Formation of southern Alberta, Canada was described in 2010 and ascribed to Prenoceratops as P. sp. The fossil was found near a fossilized nesting site of Hypacrosaurus.

Named Prenoceratops species include only P. pieganensis (type).

== Classification ==
Prenoceratops belonged to the Ceratopsia (which name is derived from Ancient Greek, meaning 'horned face'), a group of herbivorous dinosaurs with parrot-like beaks, which thrived in North America and Asia during the Cretaceous Period. It is closely related to Leptoceratops, which it antedates by several million years. It is characterized by a lower, more sloping head than that of Leptoceratops.

== Diet ==
Prenoceratops, like all ceratopsians, was a herbivore. During the Cretaceous, flowering plants were "geographically limited on the landscape", and so it is likely that this dinosaur fed on the predominant plants of the era: ferns, cycads and conifers. It would have used its sharp ceratopsian beak to bite off the leaves or needles.

== See also ==
- Timeline of ceratopsian research
