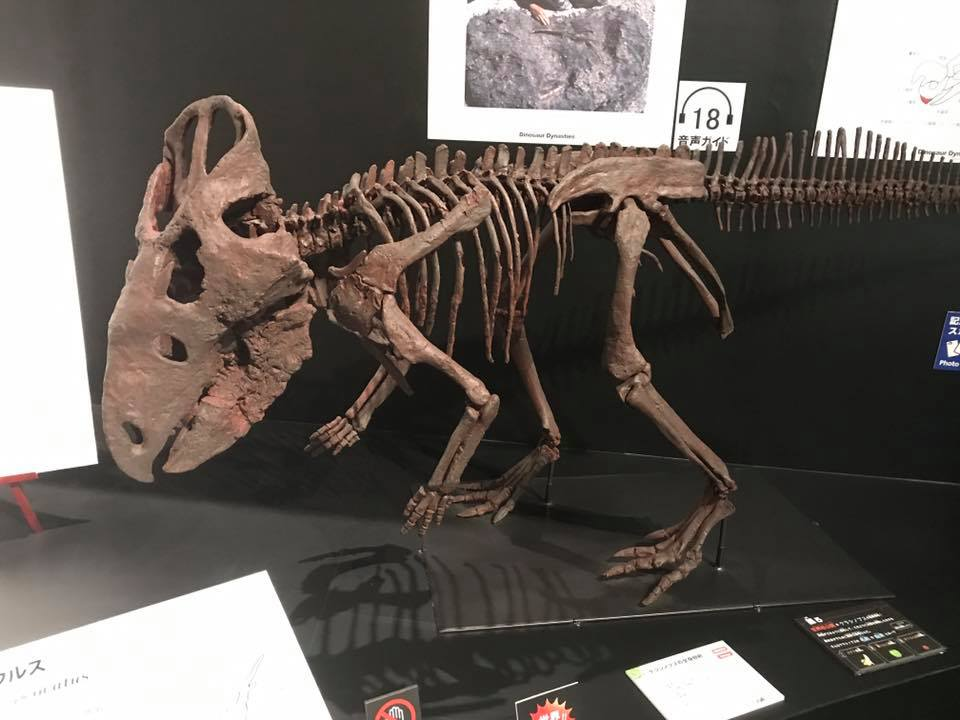
- Mounted skeleton

Scientific classification
- Kingdom: Animalia
- Phylum: Chordata
- Class: Reptilia
- Clade: Dinosauria
- Clade: †Ornithischia
- Clade: †Ceratopsia
- Family: †Leptoceratopsidae
- Genus: †Cerasinops; Chinnery & Horner, 2007
- Species: †C. hodgskissi

Binomial name
- †Cerasinops hodgskissi Chinnery & Horner, 2007

= Cerasinops =

Cerasinops Temporal range: Late Cretaceous, 80.2–77 Ma

Extinct genus of dinosaurs

Cerasinops (meaning 'cherry face') was a small ceratopsian dinosaur. It lived during the Campanian of the late Cretaceous Period. Its fossils have been found in Two Medicine Formation, in Montana. The type species of the genus Cerasinops is C. hodgskissi.

Cerasinops was named and described by Brenda Chinnery and Jack Horner in 2007 from a specimen (MOR 300) almost 80% complete, indicating a total body length of 2.5 m (8.2 ft) and a body mass of 175 kg (386 lb). It belonged to the Ceratopsia (the name is Ancient Greek for 'horned face'), a group of herbivorous dinosaurs with parrot-like beaks that throve in North America and Asia during the Cretaceous Period. Within this group, it has been placed as a basal member of Neoceratopia, although the description is variable; at one point, it is explicitly assigned to Leptoceratopsidae, but in others, it is considered a sister taxon to Leptoceratopsidae, or as a neoceratopsian in general.

== History of discovery ==
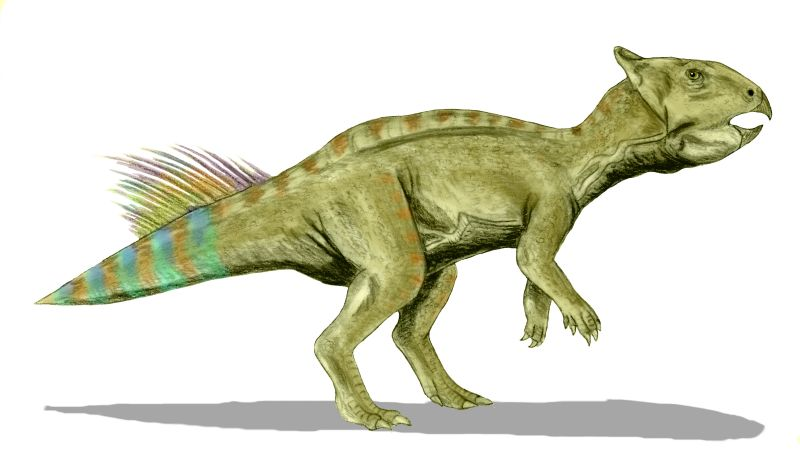
Life restoration

Three expeditions of the United States Geological Survey were conducted by American paleontologist Charles W. Gilmore in search of dinosaurs in the Two Medicine Formation of Montana, collecting a number of important specimens of ceratopsians from the region exposed in the Blackfeet Indian Reservation. The third expedition, in 1935, uncovered two specimens Gilmore attributed to Leptoceratops and a second specimen of Brachyceratops, which he described in 1939. One specimen assigned to Leptoceratops, USNM No. 13863, was collected by George Pearce on the south side of the Two Medicine River in Teton County, Montana, preserving parts of the skull and an articulated right leg. The second specimen, USNM No. 13864, was collected by George Fryer Sternberg from the north side of the river in the same county, preserving multiple parts of the skull, vertebrae, and partial forelimb and hindlimbs, weathered out of the ground. Gilmore did not assign the material to the a species of Leptoceratops due to their older age, but no features could be identified to separate them as a new taxon.

Additional specimens similar to Leptoceratops were discovered in the Two Medicine Formation by the Museum of the Rockies in land in Teton County belonging to the family of Wilson Hodgskiss, being collected by Jill Peterson and Bob Makela from red beds at a locality called Red Rocks Site in the 1980s. This specimen, MOR 300, was described and named as the new taxon Cerasinops hodgskissi by American paleontologists Brenda Chinnery and John R. Horner in 2007, with both of the specimens described by Gilmore as referred material. The genus name is from the Latin word cerasinus and suffix -ops, translating as "face of cherry" in reference to the color of the beds and fossils, while the species name is in honor of Hogdskiss who owned the land the specimen was found on. The name also includes "Cera", which had been the nickname of the specimen for over 20 years before it was described. MOR 300 preserved about 80% of the skull and skeleton in association, with much of the skull and vertebrae except the tail, both forelimbs except the hands, and most of the left and some of the right hindlimb. All specimens of Cerasinops are from the lower Two Medicine Formation, between Campanian ash beds that are dated at 77 and 80.2 million years ago.
