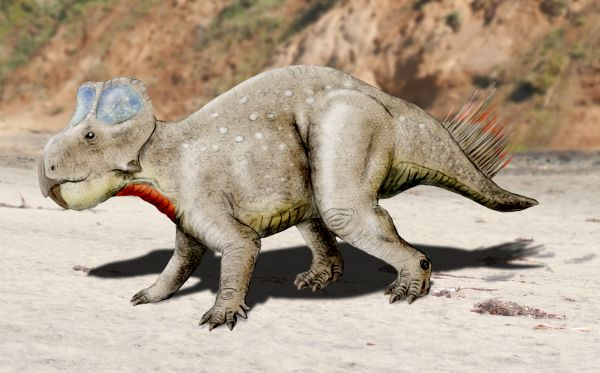
- Life restoration

Scientific classification
- Kingdom: Animalia
- Phylum: Chordata
- Class: Reptilia
- Clade: Dinosauria
- Clade: †Ornithischia
- Clade: †Ceratopsia
- Family: †Leptoceratopsidae
- Genus: †Zhuchengceratops; Xu et al., 2010
- Species: †Z. inexpectus

Binomial name
- †Zhuchengceratops inexpectus Xu et al., 2010

= Zhuchengceratops =

Zhuchengceratops Temporal range: Campanian ~77.3–73.5 Ma

Extinct genus of reptiles

Zhuchengceratops is a genus of extinct leptoceratopsid ceratopsian that lived during the Upper Cretaceous of modern-day China. It was first described in 2010, by Xu et al., who created the binomial Zhuchengceratops inexpectus. The name is derived from the location of Zhucheng, the Latinized-Greek ceratops, or "horned face", and the unexpected articulated nature of the holotype. The skeleton was found in the Wangshi Group, which is of Late Cretaceous age, and most fossils are only disarticulated bones of Shantungosaurus.

Zhuchengceratops shares many features with Leptoceratopsidae as well as other ceratopsian groups such as Ceratopsidae. The overall size of the taxon was similar to Leptoceratops, although slightly larger. Zhuchengceratops was analyzed to be in a group with Leptoceratops and Udanoceratops, although internal relationships of this triplet were unresolved.

== Discovery and naming ==
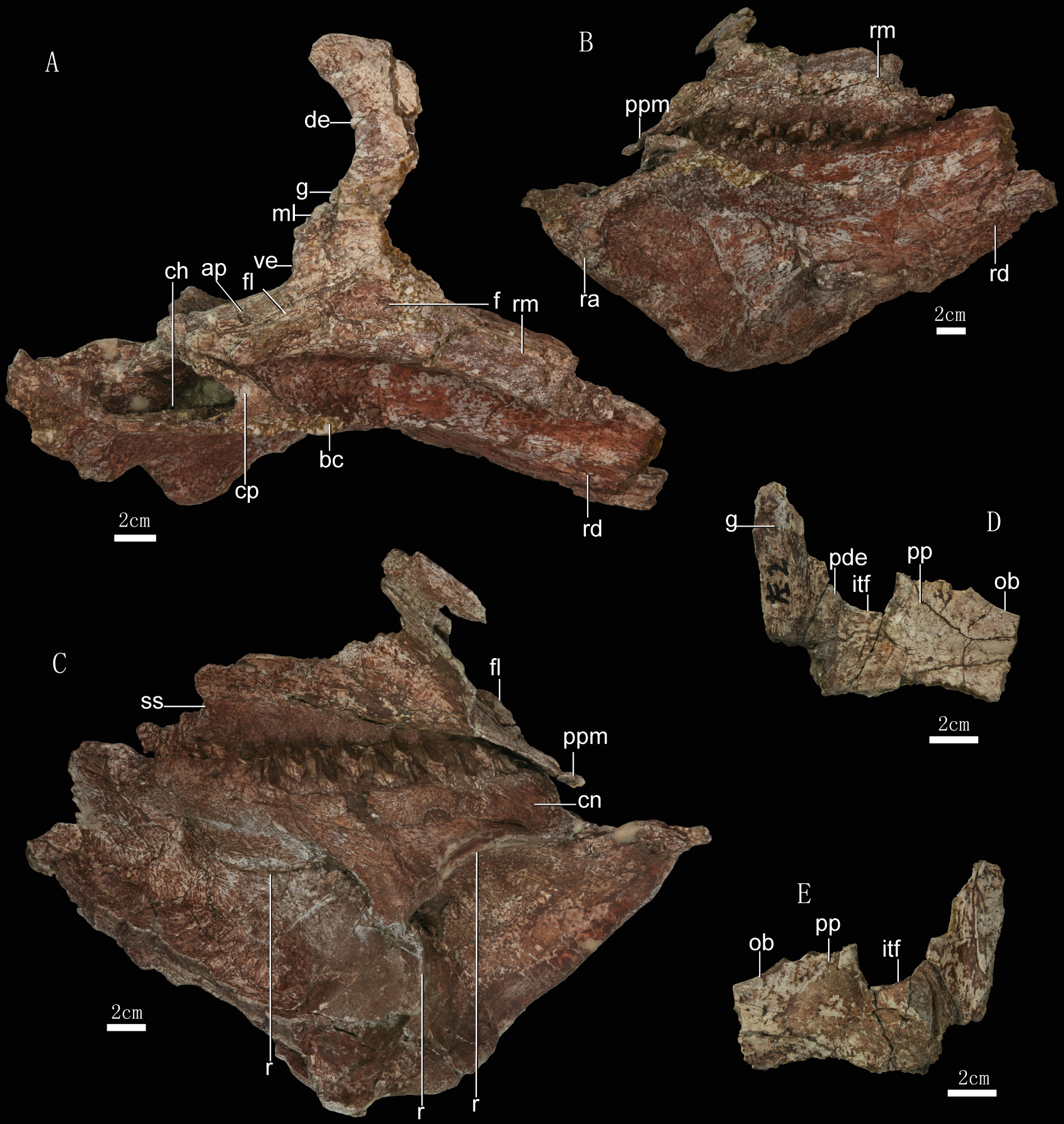
Fossil skull and mandible

Zhuchengceratops is a derived leptoceratopsid ceratopsian which lived during the Late Cretaceous period in what is now Kugou, Zhucheng County, China. It is known from a partial articulated skeleton including vertebrae, ribs, teeth, and parts of the skull and mandibles. The fossils were recovered from the Wangshi Group, of the Late Cretaceous. This genus was named by Xing Xu, Kebai Wang, Xijin Zhao, Corwin Sullivan and Shuqing Chen in 2010, and the type species is Zhuchengceratops inexpectus. The genus name was chosen for the location of Zhucheng, where the holotype was found, and the Latinized-Greek ceraptops, meaning "horned face". They chose the species name inexpectus to refer to the unexpected discovery of the articulated skeleton.

The recovered specimen of Zhuchengceratops likely represents an adult, measuring 2.5 m (8.2 ft) in length and 175 kg (386 lb) in body mass. Zhuchengceratops had a particularly massive and deep 50 cm-long mandible that is also thin transversely. This and a number of other autapomorphies unique to the genus lend it significance for increasing the morphological disparity and the taxonomic diversity of the Leptoceratopsidae. As the third leptoceratopsid from Asia, this find exhibits the coexistence and radiation of two closely related clades, whose differences in jaw and tooth adaptation may represent different feeding strategies.

== See also ==
- Timeline of ceratopsian research
