= 青山 =

青山 or 靑山 is an East Asian word that means "green mountain" or "blue mountain". It may refer to:

- Aoyama (disambiguation), places in Japan
- Castle Peak (disambiguation), places in Hong Kong
- Cheongsan-myeon (靑山面), myeon in Yeoncheon County, Gyeonggi Province, South Korea
- Qingshan (disambiguation), places in China
