= Aoyama =

Aoyama (青山) may refer to:

== Places ==
- Aoyama, Tokyo, Japan
  - Aoyama Gakuin University, a university located in Aoyama, Tokyo
  - Aoyama-itchōme Station, a railway station in Minato, Tokyo, Japan
- Aoyama, Mie, formerly a town in Naga District, but now part of the city of Iga, Mie Prefecture, Japan
- Aoyama Station (Iwate), a railway station located in Takizawa, Iwate, Japan

== People ==
- Aoyama (surname)
- Aoyama clan, a Japanese clan which came to prominence during the Sengoku period, and is the namesake of the Aoyama neighborhood in Tokyo

== Other uses ==
- Aoyama Harp, a Japanese harp manufacturer
- Aoyama Crows, a 2002 live album

== See also ==
- Qingshan (disambiguation), places in China with the same characters
- Castle Peak (disambiguation), places in Hong Kong with the same characters
