= Qingshan =

Qingshan (青山) may refer to the following locations in China:

- Qingshan District, Wuhan (青山区)
- Qingshan District, Baotou (青山区), Inner Mongolia
- Qingshan Formation (青山组), geological formation in Shandong
- Xichang Qingshan Airport (西昌青山机场), near Xichang, Sichuan

== Towns ==
- Qingshan, Shandong (苘山镇), a township-level division of Wendeng

=== Written as "青山镇" ===
- Qingshan, Baicheng, a township-level division of Taobei District, Baicheng, Jilin
- Qingshan, Guangxi, a township-level division of Guangxi, Lipu County
- Qingshan, Jiangsu, a township-level division of Jiangsu, Yizheng
- Qingshan, Jinzhai County, a township-level division of Anhui Province
- Qingshan, Henan, a township-level division of Henan, Luoshan County
- Qingshan, Shiyan, a township-level division of Hubei, Yun County, Hubei

== Townships ==
- Qingshan Township, Boli County, a township-level division of Heilongjiang
- Qingshan Township, Dongzhi County, a township-level division of Anhui Province
- Qingshan Township, Jiayin County, a township-level division of Heilongjiang
- Qingshan Township, Jilin, a township-level division in Yushu City
- Qingshan Township, Linkou County, a township-level division of Heilongjiang
- Qingshan Township, Lu'an, a township-level division Yu'an District, Anhui Province

== Subdistricts ==
- Qingshan, Hengyang (青山街道), a subdistrict of Shigu District, Hengyang, Hunan.

== People ==
- Qing Shan, Taiwanese singer

== See also ==
- Aoyama (disambiguation), places in Japan with the same characters
- Castle Peak (disambiguation), places in Hong Kong with the same characters
