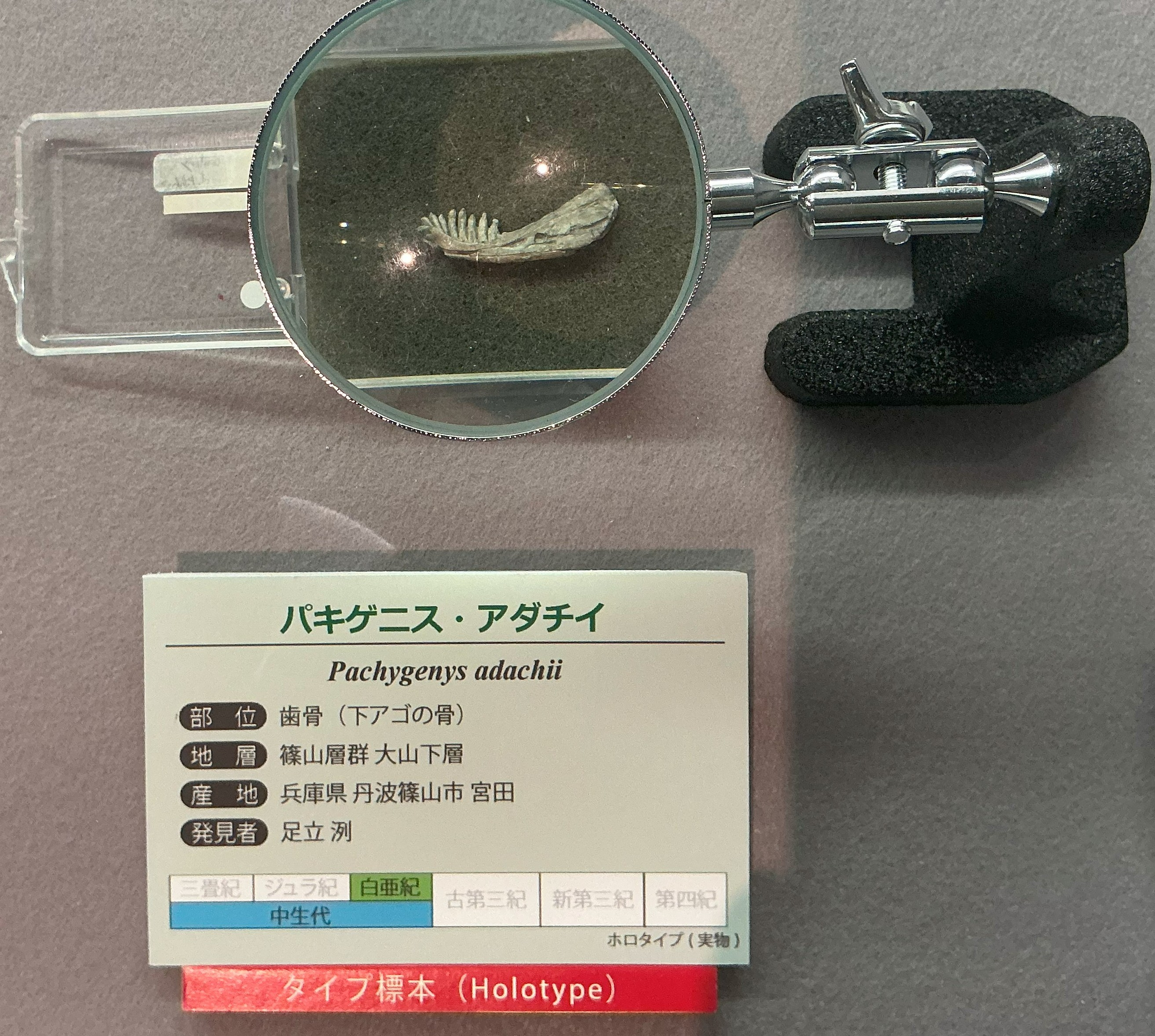
- Holotype of P. adachii

Scientific classification
- Kingdom: Animalia
- Phylum: Chordata
- Class: Reptilia
- Order: Squamata
- Suborder: Scinciformata
- Infraorder: Scincomorpha
- Genus: †Pachygenys; Gao and Cheng, 1999

Type species
- Pachygenys thlastesa Gao and Cheng, 1999

Other species
- †P. adachii Ikeda, Ota and Saegusa, 2014

= Pachygenys =

Pachygenys Temporal range: Early Cretaceous, Aptian–Albian

Extinct genus of lizards

Pachygenys ("thick jaw") is a genus of scincomorphan lizard from the Lower Cretaceous of Asia, P. thlastesa from the Doushan Formation, China, and P. adachii from the Ohyamashimo Formation, Japan. Its name is composed of the Greek words παχυς pachys ("thick") and γένυς génys ("jaw").

== Description ==
Pachygenys has a few defining characters, of which include a distinct foreshortening of the dentary tooth row and a reduced amount of dentary teeth. P. adachii differs from P. thlastesa in a few aspects; P. adachii has a shorter tooth row than P. thlastesa, as well as anterior and middle teeth that have uncuspid crowns and posterior teeth with simple, uncuspid conical crowns.
