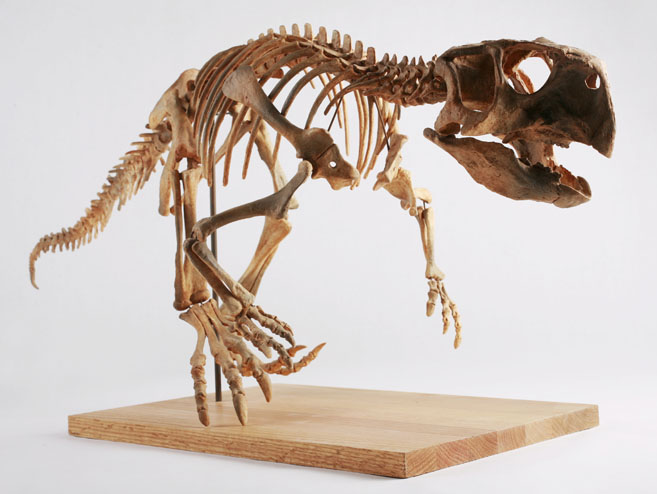
- P. meileyingensis cast, Children's Museum of Indianapolis

Scientific classification
- Kingdom: Animalia
- Phylum: Chordata
- Class: Reptilia
- Clade: Dinosauria
- Clade: †Ornithischia
- Clade: †Marginocephalia
- Clade: †Ceratopsia
- Family: †Psittacosauridae; Osborn, 1923
- Genus: †Psittacosaurus; Osborn, 1923

Type species
- †Psittacosaurus mongoliensis Osborn, 1923

Other species
- List of other species: †P. sinensis Young, 1958; †P. meileyingensis Sereno et al., 1988; †P. xinjiangensis Sereno & Zhao, 1988; †P. sattayaraki? Buffetaut & Suteethorn, 1992; †P. neimongoliensis Russell & Zhao, 1996; †P. ordosensis? Russell & Zhao, 1996; †P. mazongshanensis? Xu, 1997; †P. sibiricus Leshchinskiy et al., 2000; †P. houi You, Xu & Wang, 2003; †P. lujiatunensis Zhou et al., 2006; †P. gobiensis Sereno, Zhao & Tan, 2010; †P. amitabha Napoli et al., 2019

Synonyms
- Protiguanodon Osborn, 1923; Hongshanosaurus You, Xu, & Wang, 2003

= Psittacosaurus =

Psittacosaurus Temporal range: Early Cretaceous, 125–105 Ma

Early Cretaceous dinosaur genus

Psittacosaurus (/ˌsɪtəkəˈsɔːrəs/ SIT-ə-kə-SOR-əs; "parrot lizard" in Greek) is a genus of extinct ceratopsian dinosaur from the Early Cretaceous of what is now Asia, existing between 125 and 105 million years ago. It is notable for being the most species-rich non-avian dinosaur genus. Up to 13 species are known, from across China, Mongolia, Russia, and Thailand. The species of Psittacosaurus were obligate bipeds at adulthood, with a high skull and a robust beak. One individual was found preserved with long filaments on the tail, similar to those of Tianyulong. Psittacosaurus probably had complex behaviours, based on the proportions and relative size of the brain. It may have been active for short periods of time during the day and night, and had well-developed senses of smell and vision.

Psittacosaurus was one of the earliest ceratopsians, but closer to Triceratops than Yinlong. Once in its own family, Psittacosauridae, with other genera like Hongshanosaurus, it is now considered to be senior synonym of the latter and an early offshoot of the branch that led to more derived forms. The genera closely related to Psittacosaurus are all from Asia, with the exception of Aquilops, from North America. The first species was either P. lujiatunensis or closely related, and it may have given rise to later forms of Psittacosaurus.

Psittacosaurus is one of the most completely known dinosaur genera. Fossils of hundreds of individuals have been collected so far, including many complete skeletons. Most age classes are represented, from hatchling through to adult, which has allowed several detailed studies of Psittacosaurus growth rates and reproductive biology. The abundance of this dinosaur in the fossil record has led to the labelling of Lower Cretaceous sediments of east Asia the Psittacosaurus biochron.

== History of discovery ==
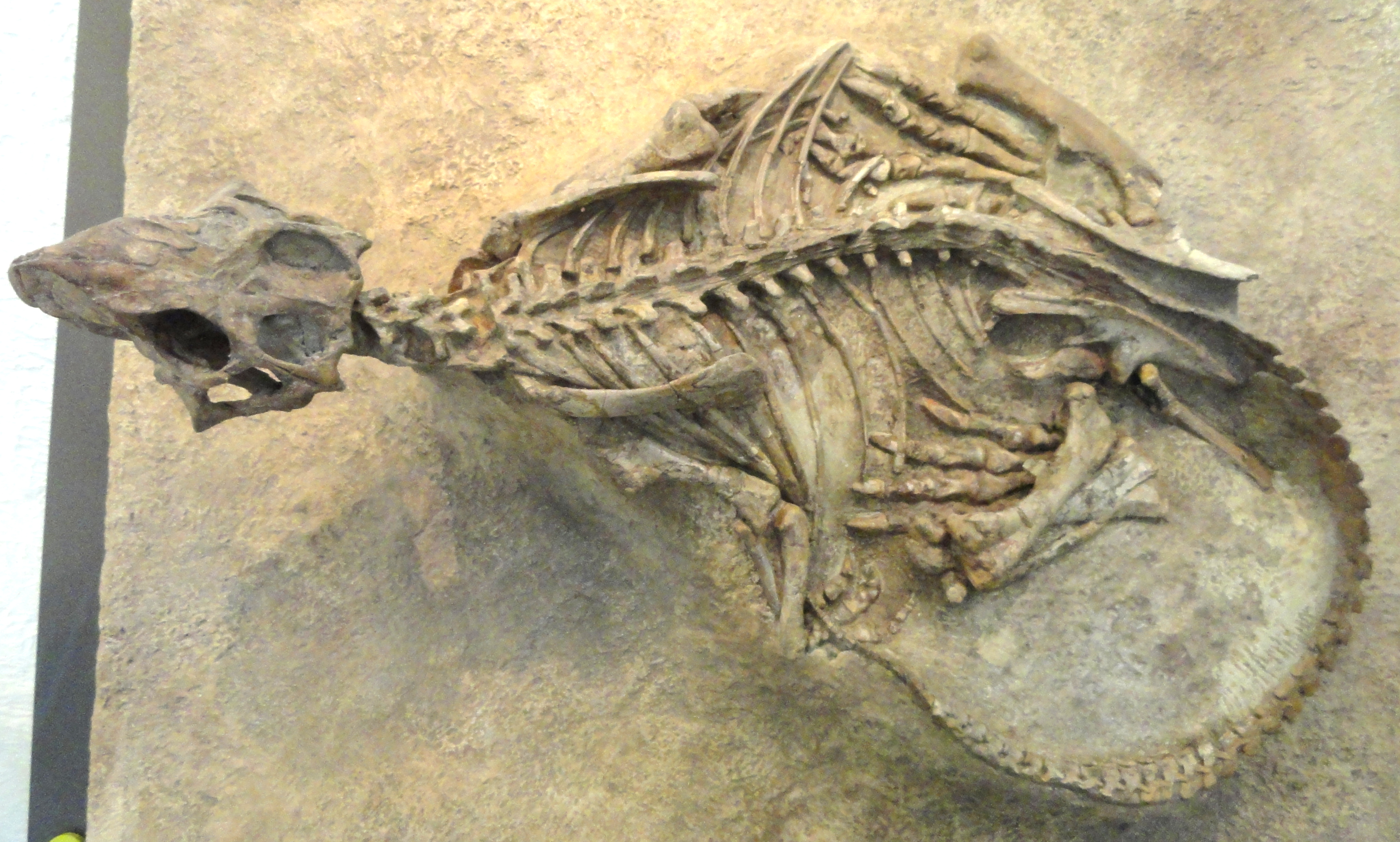
Holotype of P. mongoliensis (specimen AMNH 6254), American Museum of Natural History

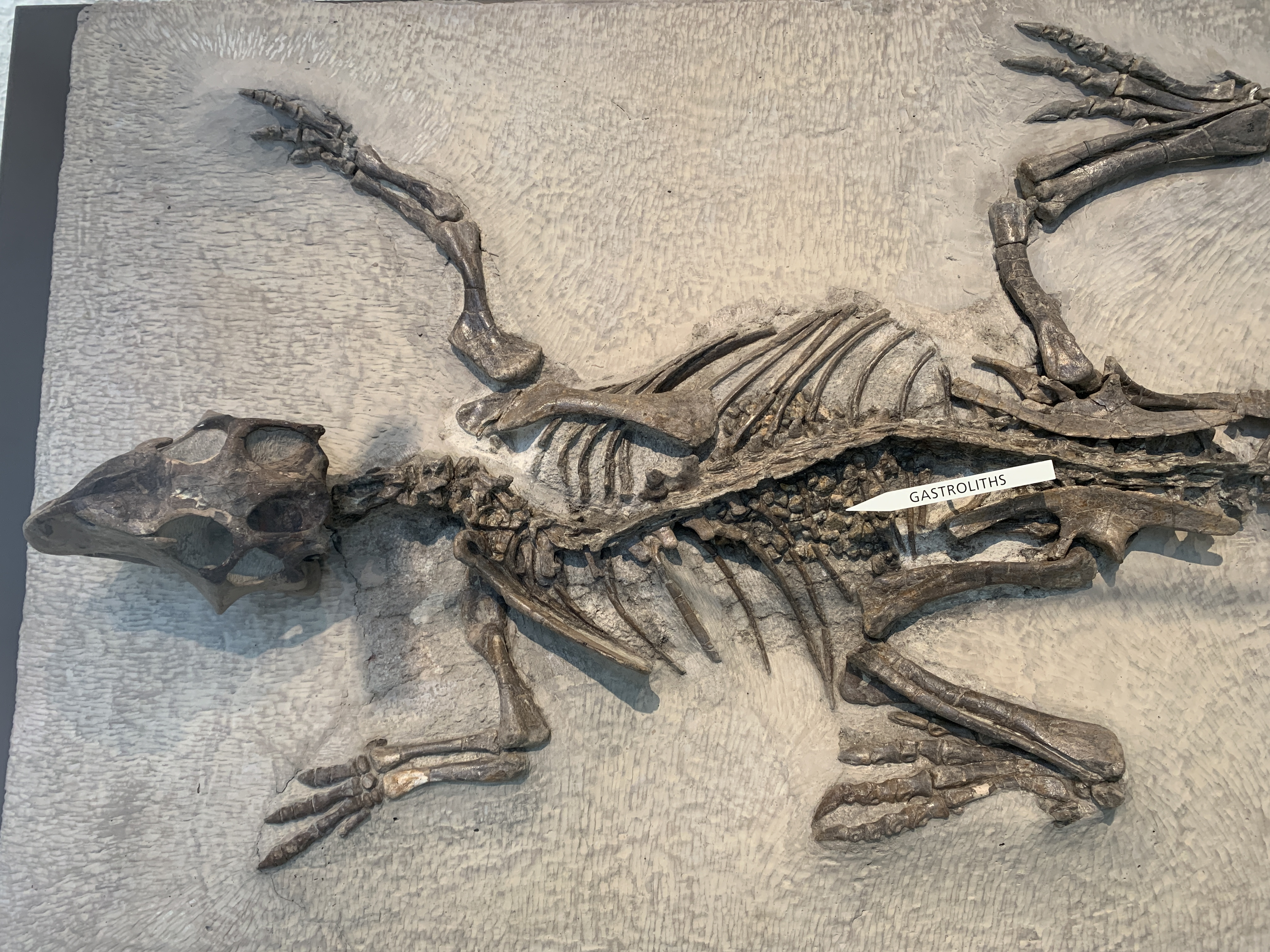
P. mongoliensis AMNH 6253, the "Protiguanodon" holotype. Note the presence of gastroliths.

In 1922, American paleontologist Henry Fairfield Osborn took part in the Third Asiatic Expedition of the American Museum of Natural History to discover fossils and geologic formations from the Cretaceous and Tertiary of Mongolia. In the Oshih Formation of the Artsa Bogdo Basin, Wong, the Mongolian chauffeur, discovered a nearly complete skull, jaws, and skeleton of a dinosaur, which was given the nickname of "Red Mesa skeleton". The location of discovery is also known as the Oshih locality of the Khukhtek Formation, of Early Cretaceous Aptian to Albian age. The specimen, catalogued as AMNH 6254, was described in 1924 by Osborn, only partially prepared, who gave it the name Psittacosaurus mongoliensis, describing its parrot-like beak on the suggestion of fellow American paleontologist William King Gregory. Osborn demonstrated the taxon was unique based on the short and deep snout, and the broad rear skull, as well as by lacking teeth in the premaxilla. In the same paper, Osborn also described another new taxon he considered similar to Psittacosaurus, Protiguanodon mongoliense, which was found in the same expedition but from the Ondai Sair Formation. The holotype of Protiguanodon, AMNH 6253, included a nearly complete skeleton found articulated, and partial remains of the skull. While Osborn considered Protiguanodon and Psittacosaurus separate based on the lack of horns on the jugal bones in Protiguanodon, a general dissimilarity in the skeletons, and wide geographic separation of the two specimens, Gregory suggested in correspondence that the Protiguanodon specimen could represent a juvenile of Psittacosaurus, based on similarities in size, the parietal bones, and the quadrate bones. Osborn created the new family Psittacosauridae for Psittacosaurus, which he considered possibly related to Ankylosauria, while he placed Protiguanodon within the family Iguanodontidae as the only member of the new subfamily Protiguanodontinae.

Osborn published an additional description of the specimens of Protiguanodon and Psittacosaurus in 1924, citing his previous study as naming both to be members of Psittacosauridae, and considering the separate status of Protiguanodontinae as uncertain. Further preparation of the skeleton of AMNH 6254 showed significant similarities in the skeletons of Psittacosaurus and Protiguanodon, including the number of teeth, the number of pre-caudal vertebrae, and other details of the skull and skeleton. Osborn also referred the specimen AMNH 6261 from the Oshih Formation to Psittacosaurus, so the teeth of the two taxa could be compared. It was mentioned in 1932 by American paleontologist Roy Chapman Andrews that AMHN 6254 was the only good specimen that could be found at Oshih, with only one additional skull and jaws of an adult, and two hatchling skulls, having been found in a later revisit to the locality in 1923.

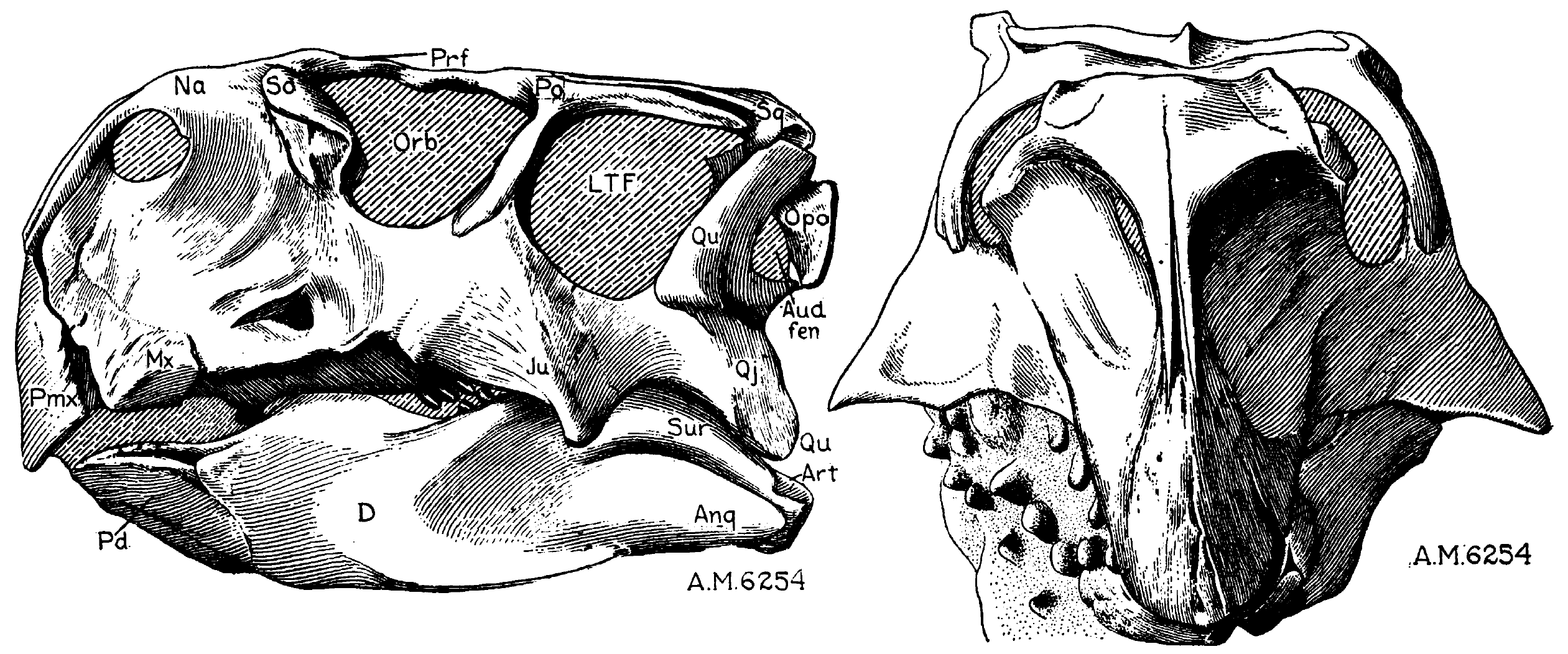
Type skull of P. mongoliensis from Osborn, 1923

Following the discovery of material of psittacosaurids in Haratologay in Inner Mongolia, Yang Zhongjian described two additional species in 1932. Known from a crushed skull and fragmentary lower jaw, Young named Psittacosaurus osborni, distinguished by its small size and lack of a sagittal crest on the parietal. The second species, P. tingi, was named for partial lower jaws and teeth, which Young only tentatively referred to Psittacosaurus instead of Protiguanodon. Both specimens, stored in the Institute of Vertebrate Paleontology and Paleoanthropology as IVPP RV31039 and IVPP RV31040 respectively, come from the Xinpongnaobao Formation. An additional tooth, partial hand, and fragments of vertebrae and limbs were found in the same locality, with the tooth being referred to Protiguanodon and the remainder of the material being uncertain. Additional Psittacosaurus material from possibly the same locality was described later in 1953 by Birger Bohlin, who considered the remains to likely belong to P. mongoliensis.

The Soviet Expeditions into Mongolia from 1946 to 1949 uncovered more material of Psittacosaurus. In 1946 they discovered a new locality, Ulan Osh, where a disarticulated specimen of Psittacosaurus mongoliensis was found, and in 1948 they revisited the sites of the American expeditions and excavated fragmentary postcrania from Oshih and Ondai Sair. The material from these expeditions was taken to the Paleontological Institute of Moscow. Soviet excavations near Kemerovo in Siberia also discovered a partial skull and skeleton of multiple individuals referrable to Psittacosaurus. This material was described by Soviet paleontologist Anatoly Rozhdestvensky in 1955, who also proposed that Protiguanodon mongoliense, Psittacosaurus osborni, and Psittacosaurus tingi were junior synonyms of Psittacosaurus mongoliensis.

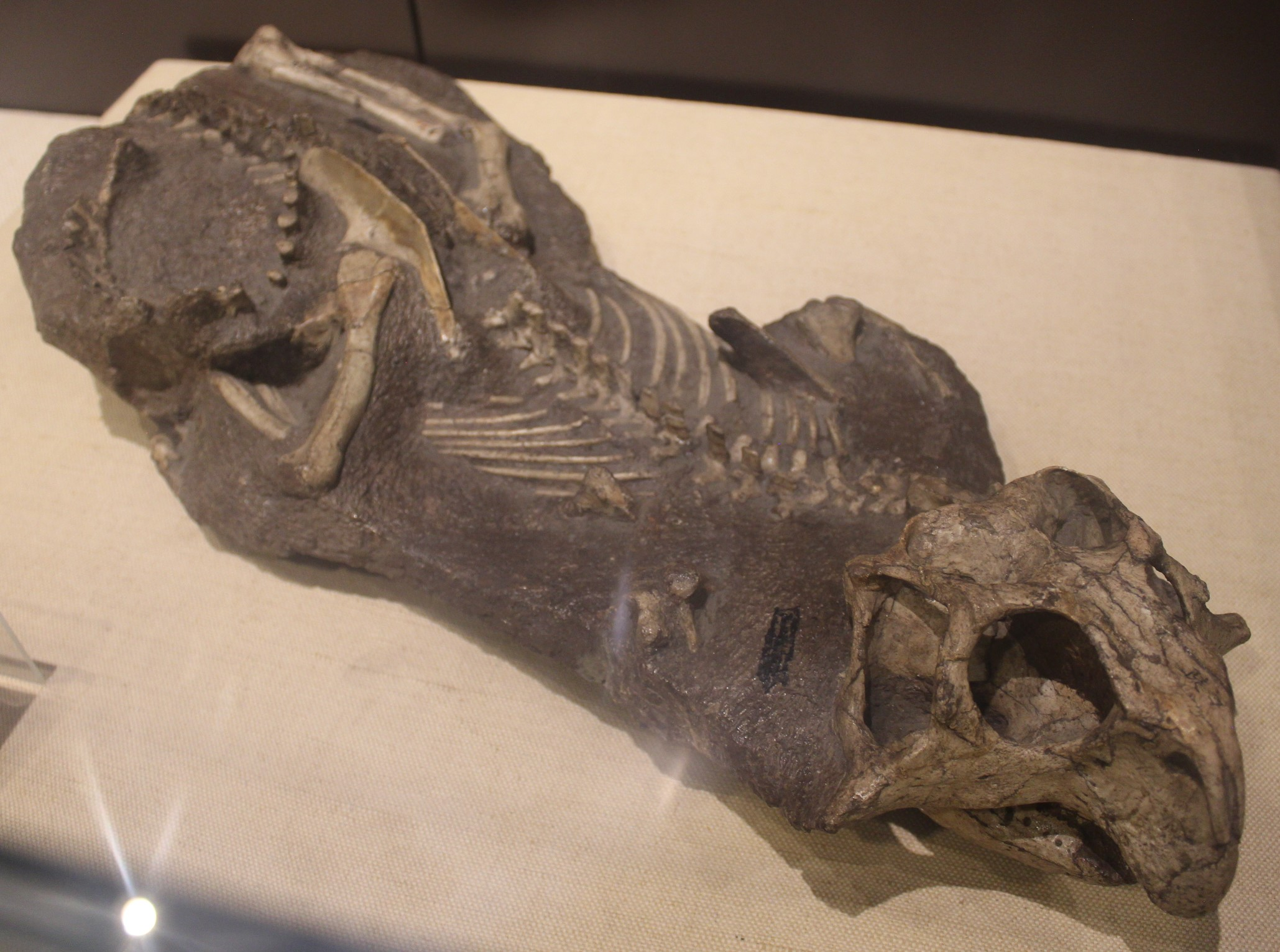
Holotype (IVPP V738) of P. sinensis

In 1958, Yang published a paper on the dinosaurs of Laiyang, in which he described multiple discoveries of Psittacosaurus from a collection of localities of the Qingshan Formation. Of this material, the nearly complete skeleton and skull IVPP V738 was described as the type of the new species Psittacosaurus sinensis, which was found in a red layer 10 mi (16 km) northwest of Rongyang City in Shandong. Yang also assigned 11 other specimens to the taxon, considering it to be the most diverse Psittacosaurus species known at the time. It was distinguished from the other known species by a shorter and wider snout, and an overall smaller size at 675 mm (26.6 in). Yang also revised the classifications of the other species of Psittacosaurus. Following similar conclusions to Rozhdestvensky, Yang considered Protiguanodon to be a junior synonym of Psittacosaurus, but retained the species as separate giving former Protiguanodon mongoliense the new species name Psittacosaurus protiguanodonensis, as otherwise both it and Psittacosaurus mongoliensis would have the same species name. Contrasting Rozhdestvensky, Yang retained the earlier Chinese species P. osborni and P. tingi as separate from P. mongoliensis, but not separate from each other, making P. tingi a junior synonym of P. osborni. Following his new breakdown of species, Yang described the distribution of the genus Psittacosaurus: P. sinensis was the only species known from Shandong; P. osborni and possibly P. mongoliensis were both known from Haratologay (also known as Tebch); P. mongoliensis and P. protiguanodonensis were both known form Oshih; and P. mongoliensis was possibly known from Kemerovo.

Further discoveries in the Qingshan Formation of Laiyang in 1958 were described by Zhao Xijin in 1962, giving the new name Psittacosaurus youngi for the specimen BPV.149 in the Beijing Museum of Natural History. Known for a complete skull, partial vertebral series and partial pelvis, P. youngi was distinguished by Zhao by having the shortest skull of all species, vertebral and tooth counts, and various features of the skull and skeleton. P. youngi was considered to be most similar to P. sinensis, but separated them to bring the count of members of Psittacosauridae to one genus and five species.

Many later expeditions by various combinations of Mongolian, Russian, Chinese, American, Polish, Japanese, and Canadian paleontologists also recovered specimens from throughout Mongolia and northern China. In these areas, Psittacosaurus mongoliensis fossils are found in most sedimentary strata dating to the Aptian to Albian stages of the Early Cretaceous Period, or approximately 125 to 100 mya. Fossil remains of over 75 individuals have been recovered, including nearly 20 complete skeletons with skulls. Individuals of all ages are known, from hatchlings less than 13 centimetres (5.1 in) long, to very old adults reaching nearly 2 metres (6 ft 7 in) in length.

In a 2010 review, Sereno again regarded P. osborni as a synonym of P. mongoliensis, but noted it was tentative because of the presence of multiple valid psittacosaur species in Inner Mongolia. Young also described the species P. tingi in the same 1931 report which contained P. osborni. It is based on several skull fragments. He later synonymised the two species under the name P. osborni. You and Dodson (2004) followed this in a table, but Sereno regarded both species as synonyms of P. mongoliensis; a table in the latter reported P. tingi as a nomen dubium, however. The front half of a skull from Guyang County in Inner Mongolia was described as Psittacosaurus guyangensis in 1983. Disarticulated postcranial remains representing multiple individuals were found at the same locality and were assigned to the species. While it differs from the type specimen of P. mongoliensis, it falls within the range of individual variation seen in other specimens of that species and is no longer recognised as a valid species. You and Dodson (2004) included P. guyangensis in a table of valid taxa, but did not include it as such in their text.

=== Assigned species ===
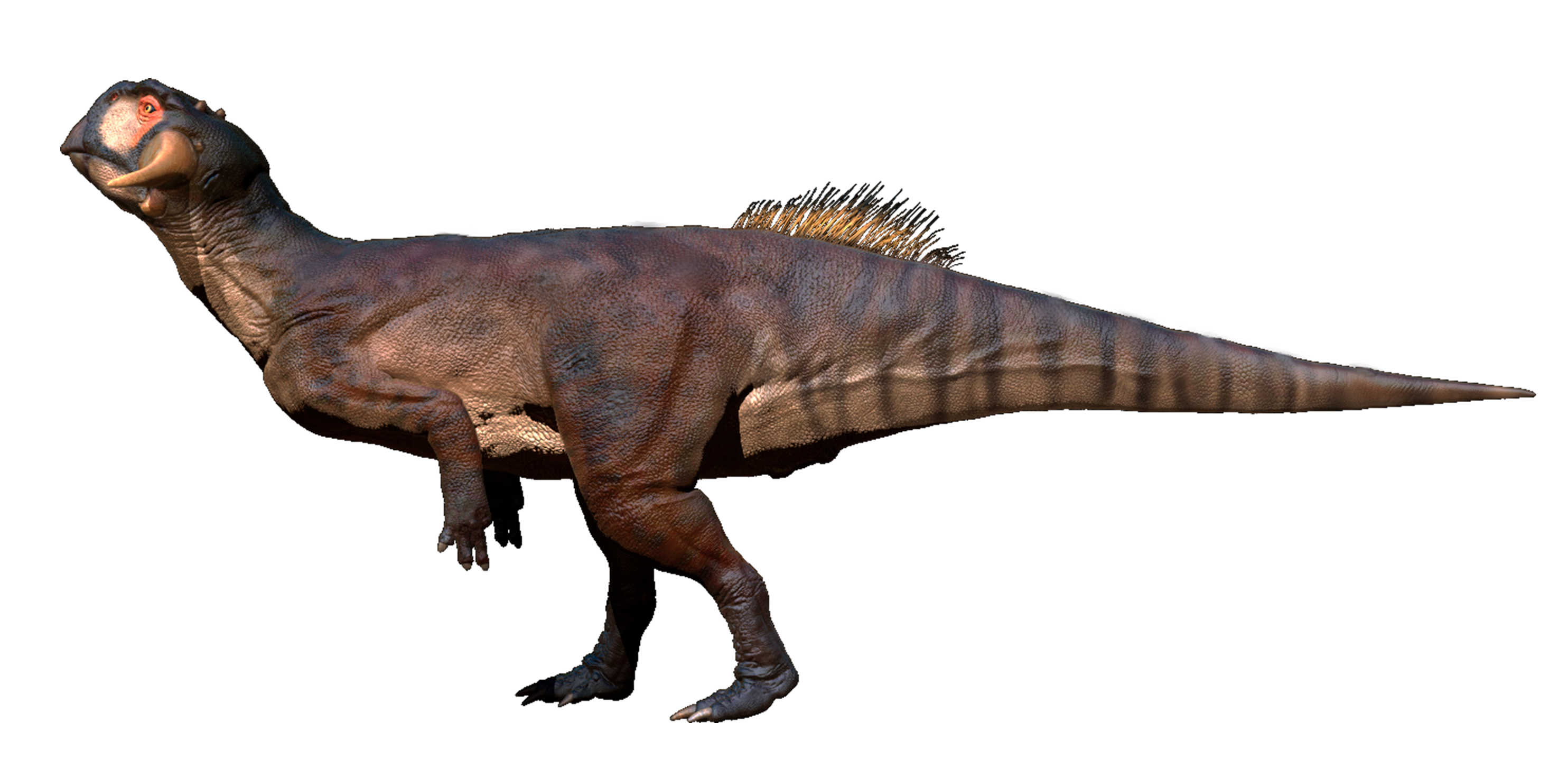
Restoration of P. sibiricus

Seventeen species have been referred to the genus Psittacosaurus, although only nine to eleven are considered valid today. This is the highest number of valid species currently assigned to any single non-avian dinosaur. In contrast, most other dinosaur genera are monospecific, containing only a single known species. The difference is most likely due to artifacts of the fossilisation process. While Psittacosaurus is known from hundreds of fossil specimens, most other dinosaur species are known from far fewer, and many are represented by only a single specimen. With a very high sample size, the diversity of Psittacosaurus can be analysed more completely than that of most dinosaur genera, resulting in the recognition of more species. Most extant animal genera are represented by multiple species, suggesting that this may have been the case for extinct dinosaur genera as well, although most of these species may not have been preserved. In addition, most dinosaurs are known solely from bones and can only be evaluated from a morphological standpoint, whereas extant species often have very similar skeletal morphology but differ in other ways which would not normally be preserved in the fossil record, such as behaviour, or colouration. Therefore, actual species diversity may be much higher than currently recognised in this and other dinosaur genera. As some species are known only from skull material, species of Psittacosaurus are primarily distinguished by features of the skull and teeth. Several species can be recognised by features of the pelvis as well.

P. sinensis

In the 1950s, a new Chinese species of Psittacosaurus was found in the Aptian-Albian Qingshan Formation of Shandong Province, southeast of Beijing. C. C. Young called it P. sinensis to differentiate it from P. mongoliensis, which had originally been found in Mongolia. Fossils of more than twenty individuals have since been recovered, including several complete skulls and skeletons, making this the most well-known species after P. mongoliensis. Chinese paleontologist Zhao Xijin named a new species after his mentor, C. C. Young, in 1962. However, the type specimen of P. youngi (a partial skeleton and skull) was discovered in the same rocks as P. sinensis and appears to be very similar, so P. youngi is generally considered a junior synonym of that better-known species. As with P. guyangensis and P. osborni, You and Dodson (2004) listed it as valid in a table, but not in their text.

P. xinjiangensis

In 1988, Zhao and American paleontologist Paul Sereno described P. xinjiangensis, named after the Xinjiang Autonomous Region in which it was discovered. Several individuals of different ages were discovered in the early 1970s by Chinese paleontologists and described by Sereno and Zhao, although the holotype and most complete skeleton belonged to a juvenile. An adult skeleton was later discovered at a different locality in Xinjiang. These specimens come from the upper part of the Tugulu Group, which is regarded as Aptian-Albian in age.

P. meileyingensis

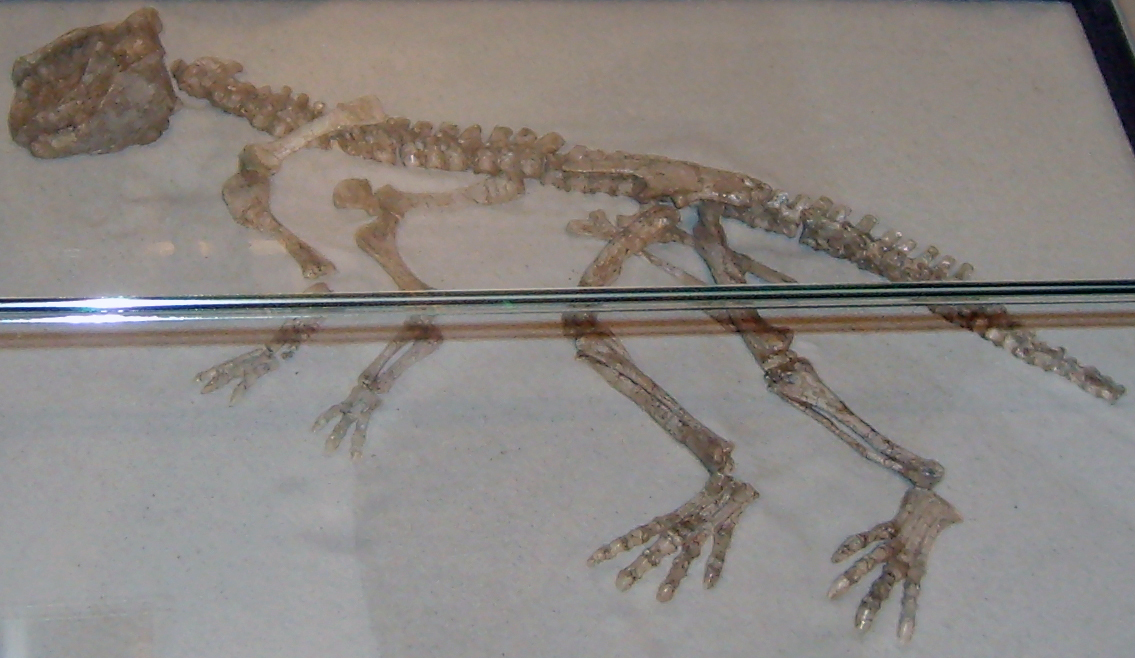
P. meileyingensis fossil, Copenhagen Zoological Museum

A second species described in 1988 by Sereno and Zhao, along with two Chinese colleagues, was P. meileyingensis from the Jiufotang Formation, near the town of Meileyingzi, Liaoning Province, northeastern China. This species is known from four fossil skulls, one associated with some skeletal material, found in 1973 by Chinese scientists. The age of the Jiufotang in Liaoning is unknown, but in the neighbouring province of Inner Mongolia, it has been dated to about 110 Ma, in the Albian stage of the Early Cretaceous.

P. sattayaraki?

French paleontologist Eric Buffetaut and a Thai colleague, Varavudh Suteethorn, described a partial upper and lower jaw from the Aptian-Albian Khok Kruat Formation of Thailand in 1992, giving it the name P. sattayaraki. In 2000, Sereno questioned the validity of this species, citing its eroded and fragmentary nature, and noted an absence of features characteristic of the genus Psittacosaurus. However, in 2002 the original authors published new images of the fossil which seem to show teeth in the lower jaw that exhibit the bulbous vertical ridge characteristic of psittacosaurs. Other authors have also defended its validity, while some continue to regard it as dubious. Sereno (2010) proposed that the best assignment for the type material may be Ceratopsia incertae sedis.

P. neimongoliensis and P. ordosensis?

Two new species of Psittacosaurus were described by Canadian Dale Russell and Zhao in 1996. The first was named P. neimongoliensis, after the Mandarin Chinese name for Inner Mongolia. It is based on a nearly complete fossil skeleton, including most of the skull, found in the Early Cretaceous Ejinhoro Formation with seven other individuals. Russell and Zhao also named P. ordosensis in 1996, after the Ordos prefecture of the Inner Mongolia Autonomous Region. The type specimen is a nearly complete skeleton, including part of the skull. However, only the skull, lower jaw, and foot have been described. Three other specimens were referred to this species but remain undescribed. Like P. neimongoliensis, this species was discovered in the Eijnhoro Formation. Sereno (2010) found the species as described to be indistinguishable from P. sinensis, another small species, but suggested that additional study of P. ordosensis might reveal diagnostic features. He provisionally designated P. ordosensis a nomen dubium.

P. mazongshanensis?

Xu Xing, another Chinese paleontologist, named a new species of Psittacosaurus in 1997, based on a complete skull with associated vertebrae and a forelimb. This material was recovered in Gansu Province, near the border with Inner Mongolia. This species is named P. mazongshanensis after the nearby mountain called Mazongshan (Horse Mane Mountain) and has been described in a preliminary manner. Unfortunately, the skull was damaged while in the care of the Chinese Institute of Vertebrate Paleontology and Paleoanthropology (IVPP), and several fragments have been lost, including all of the teeth. The remains were found in the Lower Xinminbao Formation, which have not been precisely dated, although there is some evidence that they were deposited in the late Barremian through Aptian stages. Sereno suggested in 2000 that P. mazongshanensis was a nomen dubium, with no unique features that separate it from any other species of Psittacosaurus. However, more recent authors have noted that it can be distinguished by its proportionally long snout compared to other species of Psittacosaurus, as well as a prominent bony protuberance, pointing outwards and downwards, on the maxilla of the upper jaw. The maxillary protuberance is also now missing. Other features originally used to distinguish the species have been recognised as the results of the deformation of the skull after fossilisation. Sereno (2010) remained unconvinced of its validity.

P. sibiricus

Beginning in the 1950s, Russian paleontologists began excavating Psittacosaurus remains at a locality near Shestakovo village in Kemerovo Oblast in Western Siberia. Two other nearby localities were explored in the 1990s, one of which produced several complete skeletons. This species was named P. sibiricus in 2000 in a scientific paper written by five Russian paleontologists, but credit for the name is officially given to two of those authors, Alexei Voronkevich and Alexander Averianov. The remains were not completely described until 2006. Two nearly complete, articulated skeletons and a variety of disarticulated material from other individuals of all ages are known from the Ilek Formation of Siberia, which ranges from the Barremian to Aptian stages of the Early Cretaceous. Individuals of this species could grow up to 2.5 metres (8.2 ft) in length, making it one of the largest members of the genus.

P. lujiatunensis

P. lujiatunensis, named in 2006 by Chinese paleontologist Zhou Chang-Fu and three Chinese and Canadian colleagues, is one of the oldest-known species, based on four skulls from the lower beds of the Yixian Formation, near the village of Lujiatun. While this bed has been dated differently by different authors, from 128 Ma in the Barremian stage, to 125 Ma in the earliest Aptian, revised dating methods have shown them to be about 123 million years old. P. lujiatunensis was contemporaneous with another psittacosaurid species, Hongshanosaurus houi, which was found in the same beds. It is potentially synonymous with H. houi; Sereno (2010), who proposed that Hongshanosaurus is a synonym of Psittacosaurus, opted to leave P. lujiatunensis and H. houi separate species due to the inadequacies of the latter's type specimen.

P. major

One nearly complete skeleton of P. lujiatunensis from the same lower beds of the Yixian Formation had previously been classified in its own species, Psittacosaurus major, named for the large size of its skull by Sereno, Zhao and two colleagues in 2007. You and colleagues described an additional specimen and concurred that it was distinct from P. lujiatunensis. P. major was originally characterised by a proportionately large skull, which was 39% of the length of its torso, compared to 30% in P. mongoliensis, and other features. However, a 2013 study utilising morphometric analysis showed that the supposed differences between P. lujiatunensis and P. major were due to differences in preservation and crushing. The study concluded that both represented a single species.

P. houi

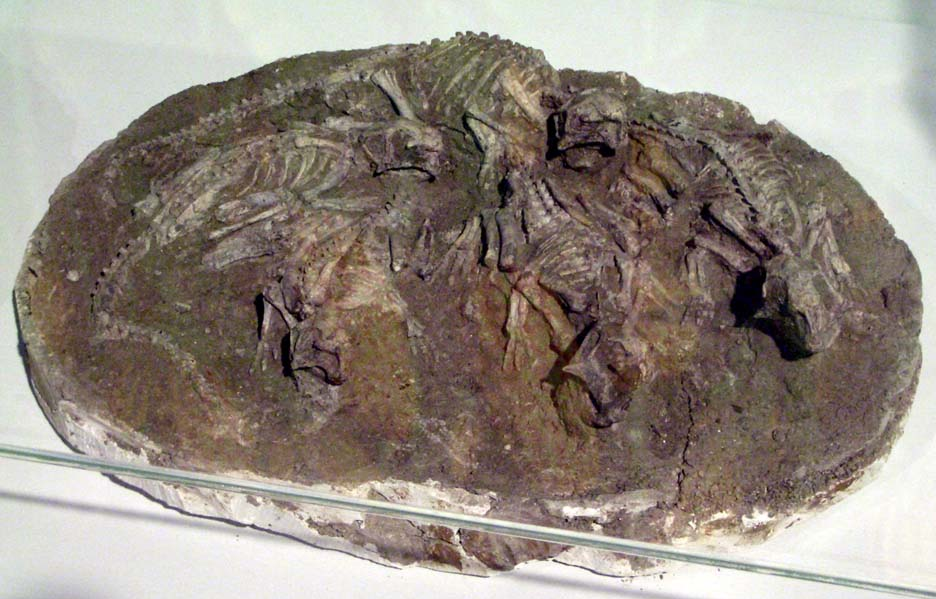
Juveniles formerly described as Hongshanosaurus, Hong Kong Science Museum

A third species of Lujiatun psittacosaur, the first to be named, was described as Hongshanosaurus houi in 2003. The generic name Hongshanosaurus was derived from the Mandarin Chinese words 紅 (hóng: "red") and 山 (shān: "hill"), as well as the Greek word sauros ("lizard"). This name refers to the ancient Hongshan culture of northeastern China, who lived in the same general area in which the fossil skull of Hongshanosaurus was found. The type and only named species, H. houi, honours Hou Lianhai, a professor at the IVPP in Beijing, who curated the specimen. Genus and species were both named by Chinese paleontologists You Hailu, Xu Xing, and Wang Xiaolin in 2003. Sereno (2010) regarded its distinct proportions as due to crushing and compression of the Hongshanosaurus skulls. He regarded Hongshanosaurus as a junior synonym of Psittacosaurus, and potentially the same as P. lujiatunensis. He did not synonymise the two species because of difficulties with the holotype skull of H. houi, instead considering new combination P. houi a nomen dubium within Psittacosaurus. Sereno's hypothesis was supported by a morphometric study in 2013, which found P. houi and P. lujiatunensis to be synonymous. While P. houi is the oldest available name, the researchers argued that because the type specimen of P. lujiatunensis was better preserved, the correct name for this species should be P. lujiatunensis rather than P. houi, which would normally have priority. A new skull of P. houi reported in 2025, however, supported that P. lujiatunensis and P. houi are separate species based on previously unknown features and phylogenetic analyses.

P. gobiensis

P. gobiensis is named for the region it was found in 2001, and first described by Sereno, Zhao and Lin in 2010. It is known from a skull and partial articulated skeleton with gastroliths. Many other specimens either cannot be determined to belong to any particular species, or have not yet been assigned to one. These specimens are generally all referred to as Psittacosaurus sp., although it is not assumed that they belong to the same species. More than 200 specimens of Psittacosaurus have been found in the Yixian Formation, which is famous for its fossils of feathered dinosaurs. The vast majority of these have not been assigned to any published species, although many are very well preserved and some have already been partially described. Nearly 100 Psittacosaurus skeletons were excavated in Mongolia during the summers of 2005 and 2006 by a team led by Mongolian paleontologist Bolortsetseg Minjin and American Jack Horner from the Museum of the Rockies in Montana. Although only P. mongoliensis has been described from Mongolia so far, these specimens are still in preparation and have not yet been assigned to a species.

P. amitabha

P. amitabha was named by American researcher James Napoli and colleagues in 2019 from a nearly complete skull, mandibles and a fragmentary postcranial skeleton. These remains were discovered by American fossil collectors M. A. Norell and J. M. Clark from the Ondai Sayr locality in the Tsaagan Nor basin of central Mongolia. This specimen is one of the few vertebrate fossils known from the Andakhuduk Formation, which dates to the Barremian stage of the early Cretaceous period. It is named after Amitabha Buddha.

== Description ==
Size comparison of P. mongoliensis to a human.

The species of Psittacosaurus vary in size and specific features of the skull and skeleton, but share the same overall body shape. The best-known—P. mongoliensis—can reach 2 metres (6.5 ft) in length. The maximum adult body weight was most likely over 20 kilogrammes (44 lb) in P. mongoliensis. Several species approach P. mongoliensis in size (P. lujiatunensis, P. neimongoliensis, P. xinjiangensis), while others are somewhat smaller (P. sinensis, P. meileyingensis). The smallest known species, P. ordosensis, is 30% smaller than P. mongoliensis. The largest are P. lujiatunensis and P. sibiricus, although neither is significantly larger than P. mongoliensis. Psittacosaurus postcranial skeletons are more typical of a 'generic' bipedal ornithischian. There are only four digits on the manus ('hand'), as opposed to the five found in most other ornithischians (including all other ceratopsians), while the four-toed hindfoot is very similar to many other small ornithischians.

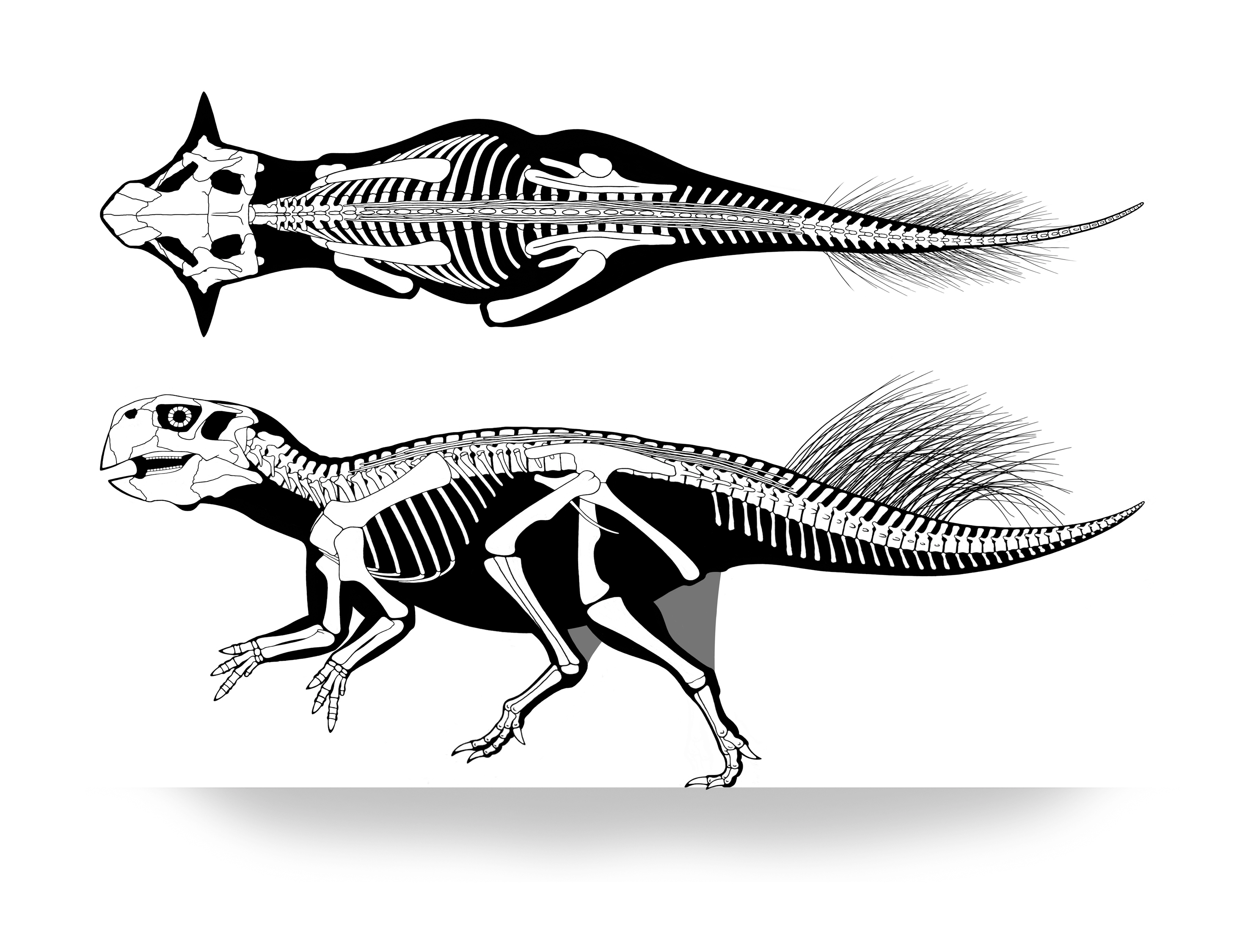
Skeletal restoration of Psittacosaurus sp. SMF R 4970

The skull of Psittacosaurus is highly modified compared to other ornithischian dinosaurs of its time. Extremely tall in height and short in length, the skull has an almost round profile in some species. The portion in front of the orbit (eye socket) is only 40% of total skull length, shorter than any other known ornithischian. The lower jaws of psittacosaurs are characterised by a bulbous vertical ridge down the centre of each tooth. Both upper and lower jaws sport a pronounced beak, formed from the rostral and predentary bones, respectively. The bony core of the beak may have been sheathed in keratin to provide a sharp cutting surface for cropping plant material. As the generic name suggests, the short skull and beak superficially resemble those of modern parrots. Psittacosaurus skulls share several adaptations with more derived ceratopsians, such as the unique rostral bone at the tip of the upper jaw, and the flared jugal (cheek) bones. There is still no sign of the bony neck frill or prominent facial horns which would develop in later ceratopsians. Bony horns protrude from the skull of P. sibiricus, but these are thought to be an example of convergent evolution.

=== Soft tissue and coloration ===
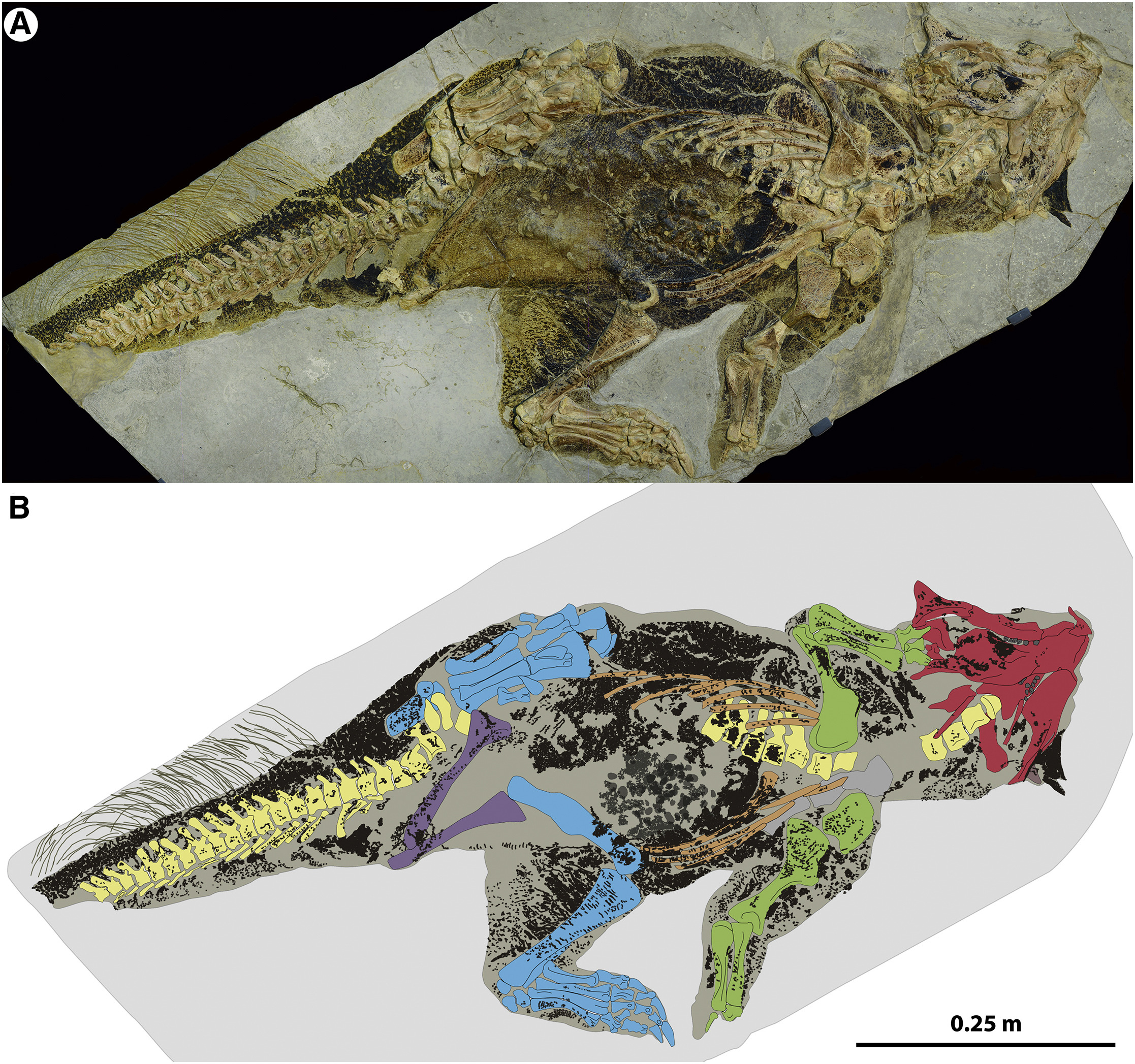
Specimen with preserved tail integument and pigmentation (specimen SMF R 4970)

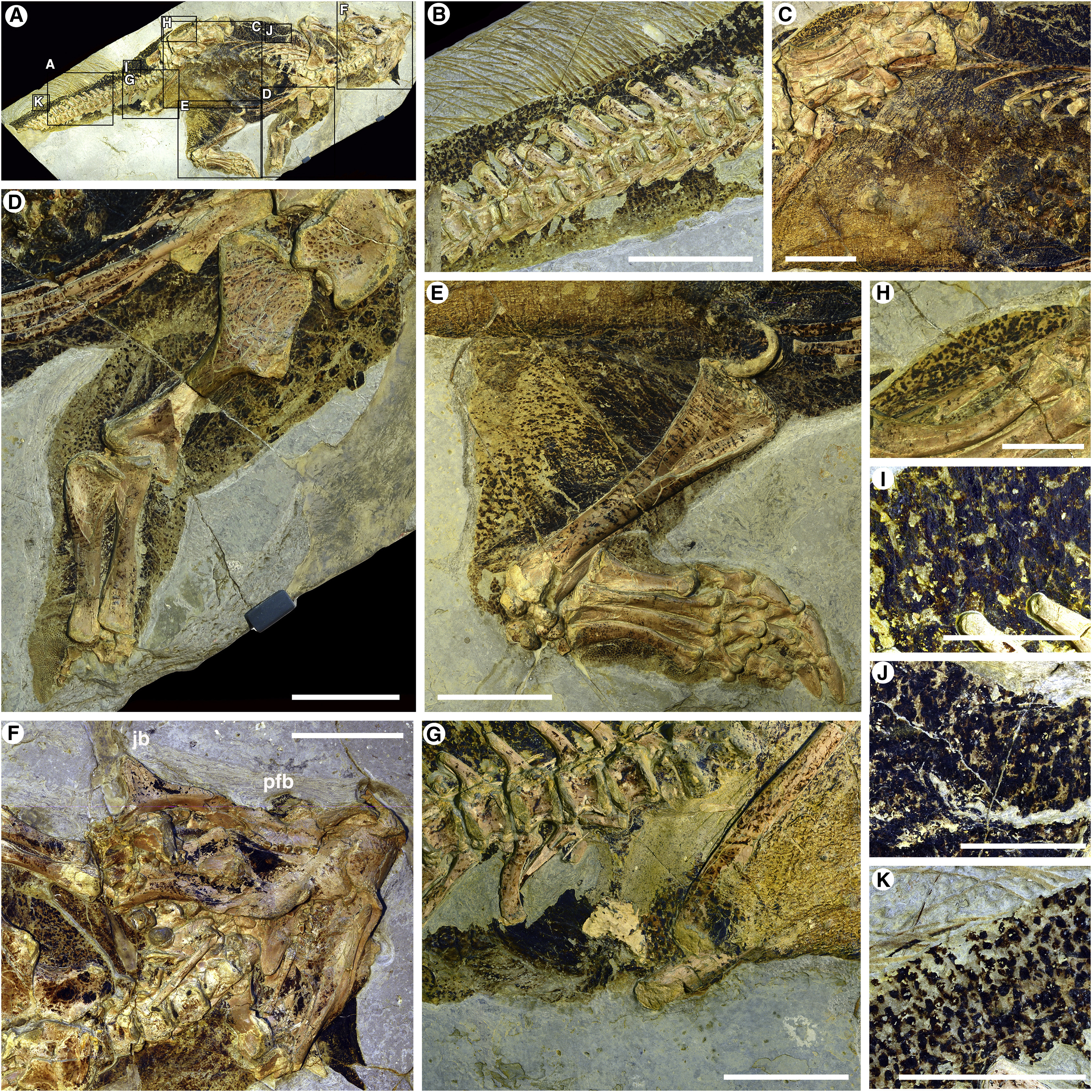
Body details of specimen SMF R 4970

The integument, or body covering, of Psittacosaurus is known from a Chinese specimen, SMF R 4970, which most likely comes from the Yixian Formation of Liaoning Province, China. The specimen, which is not yet assigned to any particular species, was likely illegally exported from China and was purchased in 2001 by the Senckenberg Museum in Germany. It was described while awaiting repatriation; previous repatriation attempts were unsuccessful.

Most of the body was covered in scales. Larger scales were arranged in irregular patterns, with numerous smaller scales occupying the spaces between them, similarly to skin impressions known from other ceratopsians, such as Chasmosaurus. A series of what appear to be hollow, tubular bristle-like structures, approximately 16 centimetres (6.3 in) long, were also preserved, arranged in a row down the dorsal (upper) surface of the tail. These were confirmed by the authors, as well as an independent scientist, to not represent plant material. The bristle-like integumentary structures extend into the skin nearly to the vertebrae, and were likely circular or tubular before being preserved. Under ultraviolet light, they gave off the same fluorescence as scales, providing the possibility they were keratinized. The study stated that, "at present, there is no convincing evidence which shows these structures to be homologous to the structurally different integumentary filaments of theropod dinosaurs". However, they found that all other feather-like integument from the Yixian Formation could be identified as feathers.

In 2008, another study was published describing the integument and dermis of Psittacosaurus sp., from a different specimen. The skin remains could be observed by a natural cross-section to compare them to modern animals, showing that dinosaurian dermal layers evolved in parallel to those in many other large vertebrates. The collagen tissue fibres in Psittacosaurus are complex, virtually identical to all other vertebrates in structure but having an exceptional thickness of about forty layers. As the sections of dermis were collected from the abdomen, where the scales were eroded, the tissue may have assisted with the musculature of the stomach and intestines and offered protection against predators.

As described in a 2016 study, examination of melanosomes preserved in the specimen of Psittacosaurus preserved with integument indicated that the animal was countershaded, likely related to living in a dense forest habitat with little light, much like many modern species of forest-dwelling deer and antelope; stripes and spots on the limbs may represent disruptive coloration. The specimen also had dense clusters of pigment on its shoulders, face (possibly for display), and cloaca (which may have had an antimicrobial function, though this has been disputed), as well as large patagia on its hind legs that connected to the base of the tail. Its large eyes indicate that it also likely had good vision, which would have been useful in finding food or avoiding predators. The authors pointed out that there might have been variation in coloration across the range of the animal, depending on differences in the light environment. The authors were unable to determine which species of Jehol Formation Psittacosaurus the specimen belonged to due to the way the skull is preserved, but ruled out P. mongoliensis, based on hip features.

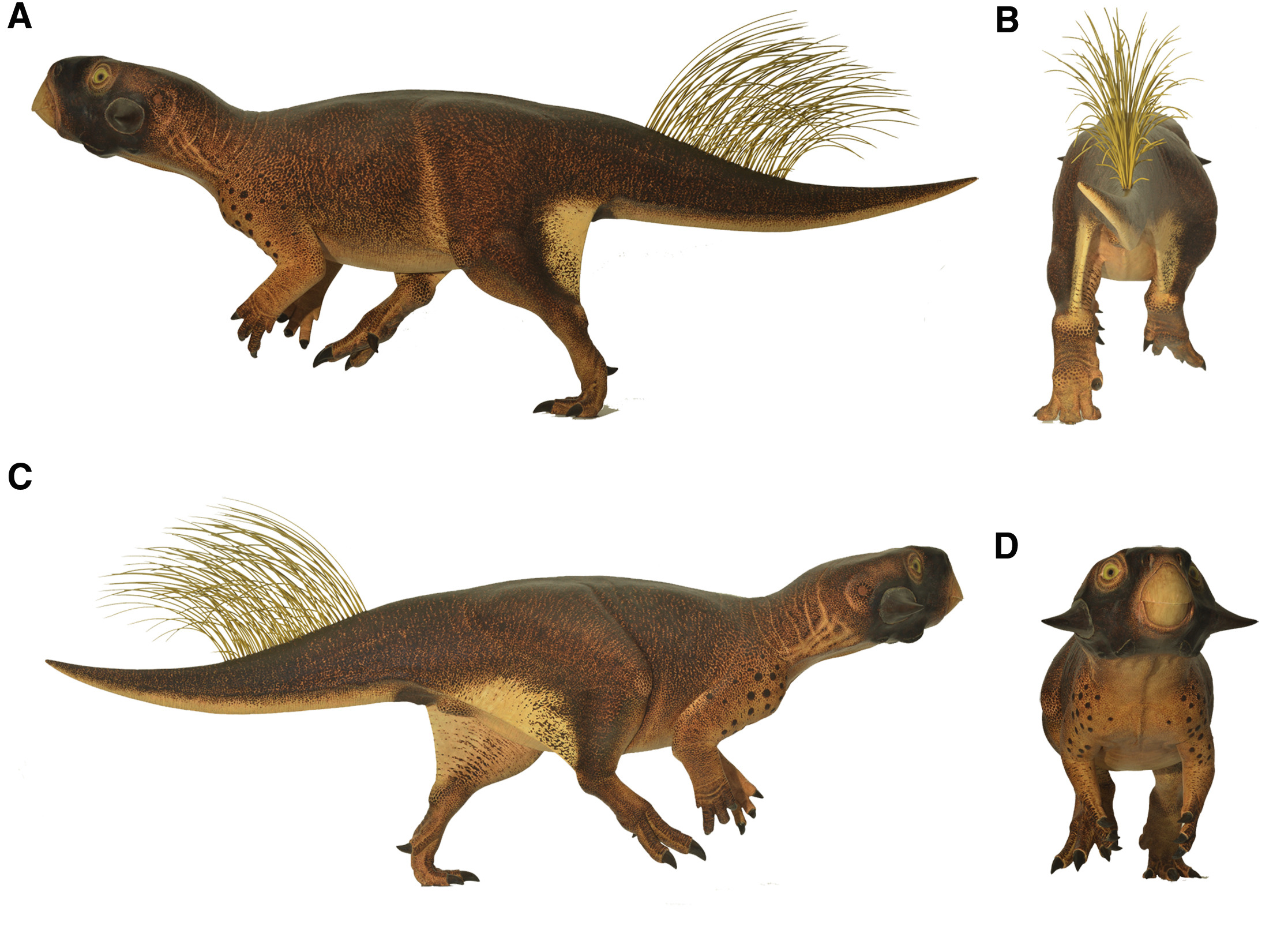
Model based on SMF R 4970

Another 2016 study used laser-stimulated fluorescence imaging to analyze the internal structure of the bristles. The highly cornified bristles were arranged in tight clusters of three to six individual bristles, with each bristle being filled with pulp. The authors considered the bristles as being most similar to the quills of Tianyulong, and the sparsely distributed elongated broad filamentous feathers (EBFFs) of Beipiaosaurus. Similar, non-feather-derived bristles are found in a few extant birds such as the "horn" on the horned screamer and the "beards" of turkeys; these structures differ from feathers in that they are unbranched, heavily cornified and do not develop from a follicle, but instead arise from discrete cell populations that exhibit continuous growth. A 2016 study by Ji Qiang and colleagues was published in the Journal of Geology. Their conclusion was that these were actually highly modified scales because the morphology and anatomy did not resemble feathers. A darkened soft-tissue structure was also found near the jugal horn; this may represent a keratinous sheath or a skin flap.

A 2021 study of SMF R 4970 examined its cloaca, the first one known from a non-avian dinosaur. The positioning of the individual when it died is oriented obliquely, so the structure can be seen better in the right side. Psittacosaurus' cloaca is comparable to those of crocodilians, with discrete lateral lips that converge anteriorly, giving the cloaca a v-shape anatomy. It also shows resemblance to that of birds, with the dorsal lobe being homologous to the birds' cloacal protuberance. A 2022 study of SMF R 4970 identified it as an approximately 6–7 year old subadult by comparing its femoral length to that of similarly-aged specimens of P. lujiatunensis, and found that it preserves the first umbilicus (belly button) known from a non-avian dinosaur (the oldest known from an amniote). Because the specimen is close to sexual maturity, it is likely that the umbilicus probably retained throughout this individual's life and that Psittacosaurus had its umbilicus at least until sexual maturity. It is uncertain whether the umbilicus is present in mature or nearly mature individuals of all non-avian dinosaurs.

=== Species characteristics ===
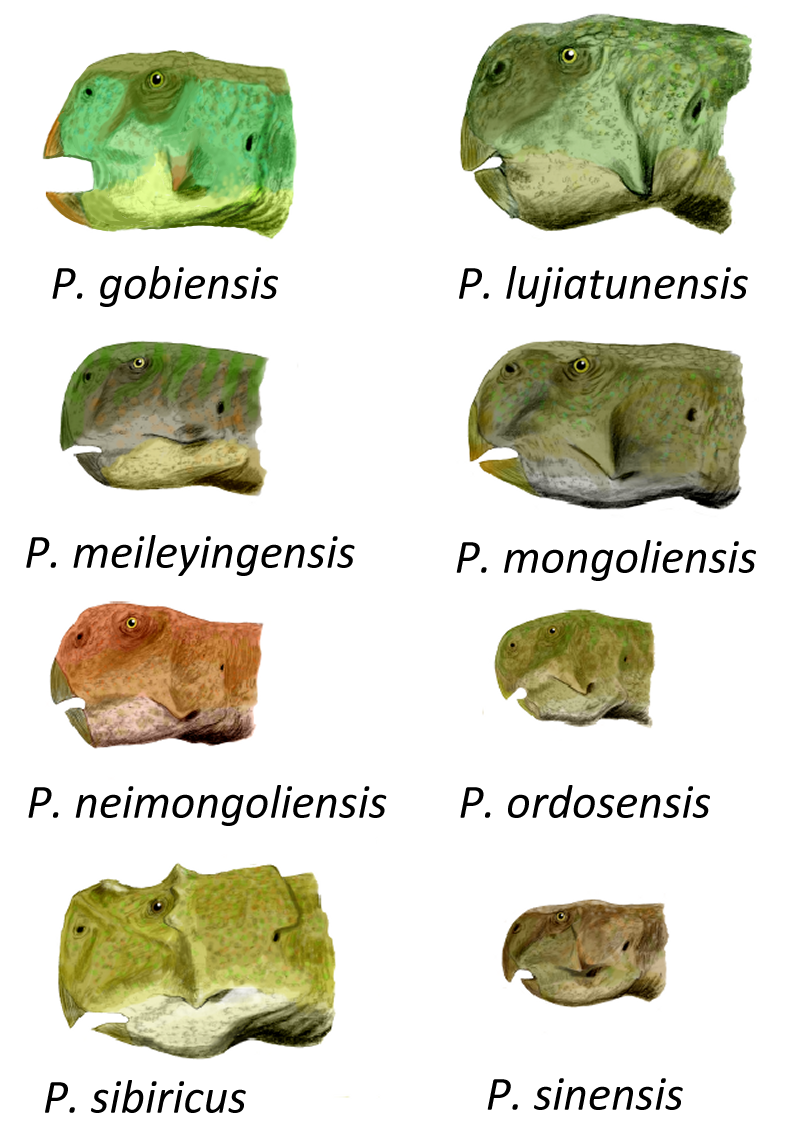
Restored heads of eight species, to scale

Skulls of P. mongoliensis are flat on top, especially over the back of the skull, with a triangular depression, the antorbital fossa, on the outside surface of the maxilla (an upper jaw bone). A flange is present on the lower edge of the dentary (the tooth-bearing bone of the lower jaw), although it is not as prominent as in P. meileyingensis or P. major (=P. lujiatunensis). P. mongoliensis is among the largest known species. The skull of the type specimen, which is probably a juvenile, is 15.2 centimetres (6 in) long, and the associated femur is 16.2 centimetres (6.4 in) in length. Other specimens are larger, with the largest documented femur measuring about 21 centimetres (8.25 in) long.

P. sinensis is readily distinguished from all other species by numerous features of the skull. Adult skulls are smaller than those of P. mongoliensis and have less teeth. Uniquely, the premaxillary bone contacts the jugal (cheek) bone on the outside of the skull. The jugals flare out sideways, forming 'horns' proportionally wider than in any other known Psittacosaurus species except P. sibiricus and P. lujiatunensis. Because of the flared cheeks, the skull is actually wider than it is long. A smaller 'horn' is present behind the eye, at the contact of the jugal and postorbital bones, a feature also seen in P. sibiricus. The mandible (lower jaw) lacks the hollow opening, or fenestra, seen in other species, and the entire lower jaw is bowed outwards, giving the animal the appearance of an underbite. The skull of an adult P. sinensis can reach 11.5 centimeters (4.5 in) in length.

P. sibiricus is the largest-known species of Psittacosaurus. The skull of the type specimen is 20.7 centimetres long (8.25 in), and the femur is 22.3 cm (8.75 in) in length. It is also distinguished by its neck frill, which is longer than any other species, at 15 to 18% of skull length. A very striking feature of P. sibiricus is the number of 'horns' around the eyes, with three prominences on each postorbital, and one in front of each eye, on the palpebral bones. Similar horns found on the postorbital of P. sinensis are not as pronounced but may be homologous. The jugal has extremely prominent 'horns' and may contact the premaxilla, both features also seen in the possibly related P. sinensis. There is a flange on the dentary of the lower jaw, similar to P. mongoliensis, P. meileyingensis, and P. sattayaraki. It can be told apart from the other species of Psittacosaurus by a combination of 32 anatomical features, including six that are unique to the species. Most of these are skull details, but one unusual feature is the presence of 23 vertebrae between the skull and pelvis, unlike the 21 or 22 in the other species where the vertebrae are known.

P. xinjiangensis is distinguished by a prominent jugal 'horn' that is flattened on the front end, as well as some features of the teeth. The ilium, one of the three bones of the pelvis, also bears a characteristically long bony process behind the acetabulum (hip socket). An adult femur has a published length of about 16 centimetres (6.3 in). P. meileyingensis has the shortest snout and neck frill of any species, making the skull nearly circular in profile. The orbit (eye socket) is roughly triangular, and there is a prominent flange on the lower edge of the dentary, a feature also seen in specimens of P. lujiatunensis, and to a lesser degree in P. mongoliensis, P. sattayaraki, and P. sibiricus. The complete type skull, probably adult, is 13.7 centimetres (5.5 in) long. The dentary of P. sattayaraki has a flange similar to that found in P. mongoliensis, P. sibiricus, P. lujiatunensis and P. meileyingensis, although it is less pronounced than in those species. The material appears to be roughly the same size as P. sinensis. The frontal bone of P. neimongoliensis is distinctly narrow compared to that of other species, resulting in a narrower skull overall. The ischium bone of the pelvis is also longer than the femur, which differs from other species in which these bones are known. The type specimen has a skull length of 13.2 centimetres (5.2 in) and a femoral length of 13 centimetres (5.1 in), but is not fully grown. An adult P. neimongoliensis was probably smaller than P. mongoliensis, with a proportionately longer skull and tail. P. ordosensis can be distinguished by numerous features of the jugals, which have very prominent 'horns'. It is also the smallest known species. One adult skull measures only 9.5 centimeters (3.75 in) in length.

The type skull of P. lujiatunensis measures 19 cm (7.5 in) in length, while the largest-known skull is 20.5 centimetres (8 in) long, so this species was similar in size to P. mongoliensis and P. sibiricus. There is a fossa in front of the eye, as in P. mongoliensis. The jugal bones flare outwards widely, making the skull wider than it is long, as seen in P. sinensis. Widely flared jugals are also found in P. sibiricus. Overall, this species is thought to exhibit several primitive characteristics compared to other species of Psittacosaurus, which is consistent with its greater geological age. P. gobiensis was small-bodied (one metre (3 ft 3 in) long) and differs from other species of Psittacosaurus by "significant, but structurally minor, details." These include the presence of a pyramidal horn on the postorbital, a depression on the postorbital-jugal contact, and enamel thickness. P. mongoliensis was a contemporary.

== Classification ==
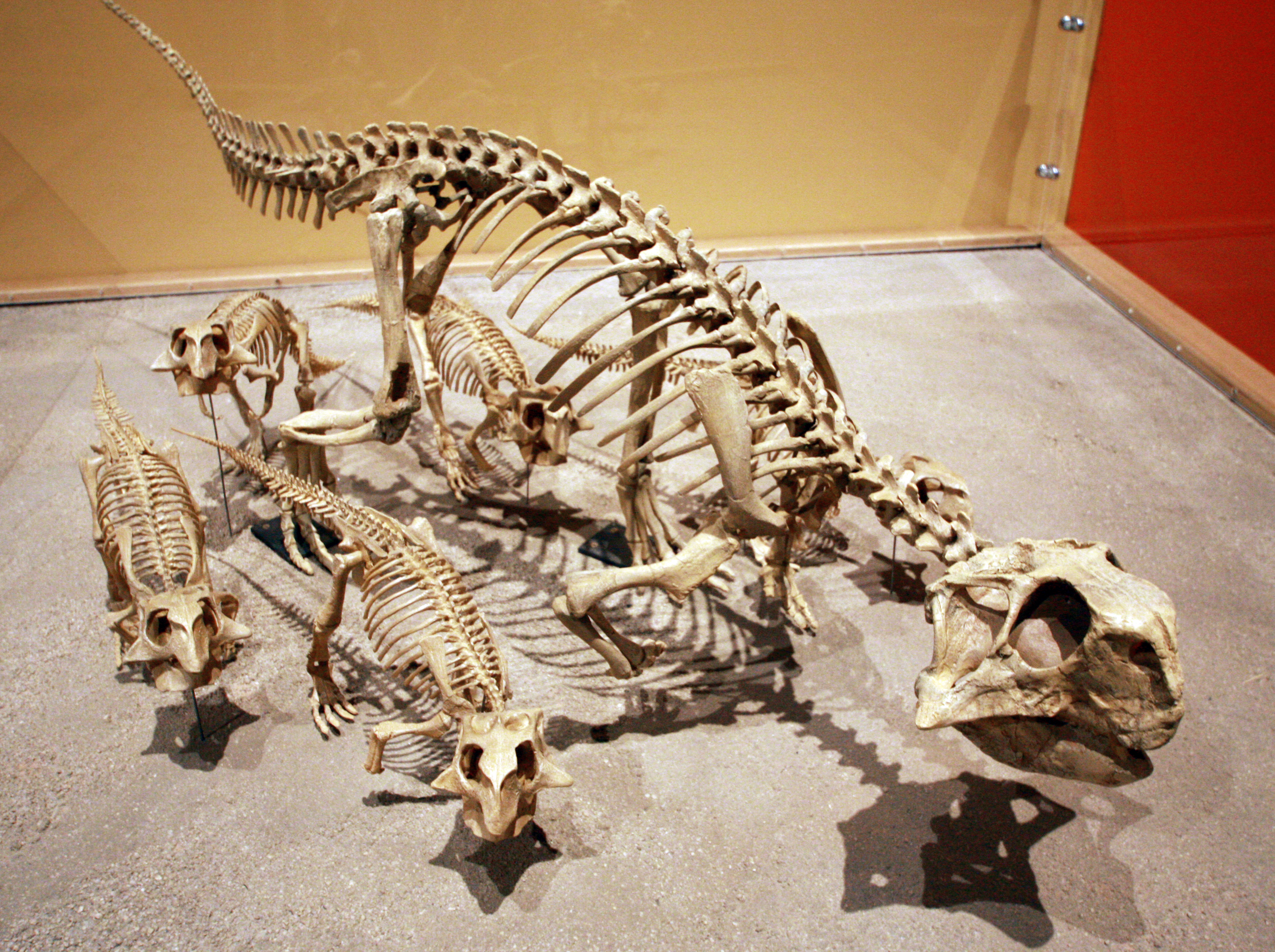
Reconstructed skeletons of an adult with juveniles

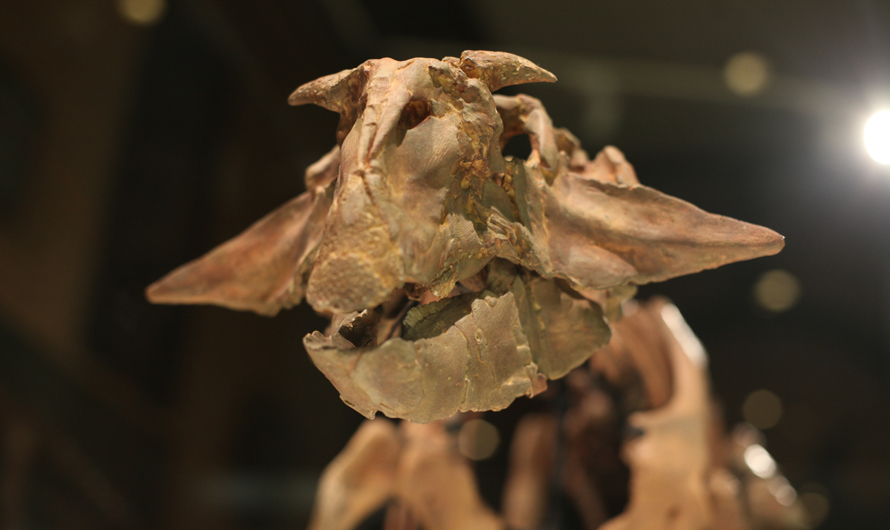
P. sibiricus skull in front view

Psittacosaurus is the type genus of the family Psittacosauridae, which was also named by Osborn in 1923. Psittacosaurids were basal to almost all known ceratopsians except Yinlong and perhaps the Chaoyangsauridae. While Psittacosauridae was an early branch of the ceratopsian family tree, Psittacosaurus itself was probably not directly ancestral to any other groups of ceratopsians. All other ceratopsians retained the fifth digit of the hand, a plesiomorphy or primitive trait, whereas all species of Psittacosaurus had only four digits on the hand. In addition, the antorbital fenestra, an opening in the skull between the eye socket and nostril, was lost during the evolution of Psittacosauridae, but is still found in most other ceratopsians and in fact most other archosaurs. It is considered highly unlikely that the fifth digit or antorbital fenestra would evolve a second time.

In 2014, the describers of a new taxon of basal ceratopsian published a phylogenetic analysis encompassing Psittacosaurus. The below cladogram is from their analysis, placing the genus as one of the most primitive ceratopsians. The authors (Farke et al.) noted that all taxa outside of Leptoceratopsidae and Coronosauria with the exception of their genus Aquilops are from Asia, meaning the group likely originated there.

- Marginocephalia
  - Pachycephalosauria
    Stegoceras
  - Ceratopsia
    - Yinlong
    - - - Xuanhuaceratops
        - Chaoyangsaurus
      - - Psittacosaurus
          - P. sinensis
          - P. mongoliensis
        - Neoceratopsia
          - Liaoceratops
          - - Aquilops
            - - - Auroraceratops
                - Yamaceratops
              - - - Helioceratops
                  - Archaeoceratops
                - - Koreaceratops
                  - - Leptoceratopsidae
                    - Coronosauria

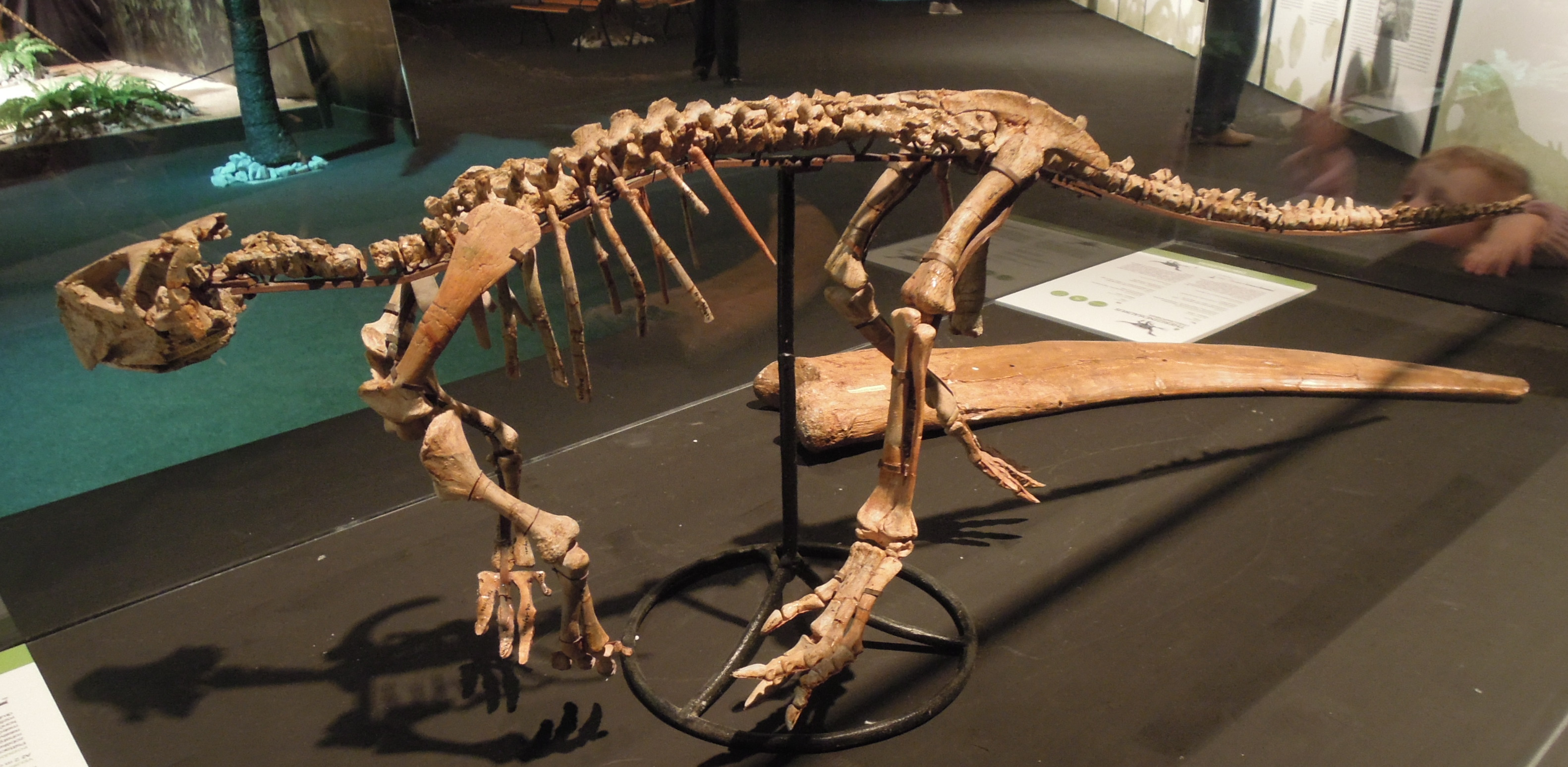
Mounted P. mongoliensis skeleton PIN 3379/11, Dinosaurium

Although many species of Psittacosaurus have been named, their relationships to each other have not yet been fully explored and no scientific consensus exists on the subject. Several phylogenetic analyses have been published, with the most detailed being those by Alexander Averianov and colleagues in 2006, Hai-Lu You and colleagues in 2008, and Paul Sereno in 2010. In 2005, Zhou and colleagues suggested that P. lujiatunensis is basal to all other species. This would be consistent with its earlier appearance in the fossil record. In 2025, Asato Ishikawa and colleagues published a re-evaluation of Hongshanosaurus and concluded that it belonged to Psittacosaurus (the species P. houi). An abbreviated version of the analysis they published is shown below.

- Ceratopsia
  - Albalophosaurus
  - - Psittacosaurus
      - P. sinensis
      - - P. sibiricus
        - - - P. lujiatunensis
            - P. gobiensis
          - - P. amitabha
            - - P. mongoliensis
              - - P. houi (formerly Hongshanosaurus)
                - P. major
    - - Chaoyangsauridae
      - Neoceratopsia

== Paleobiology ==
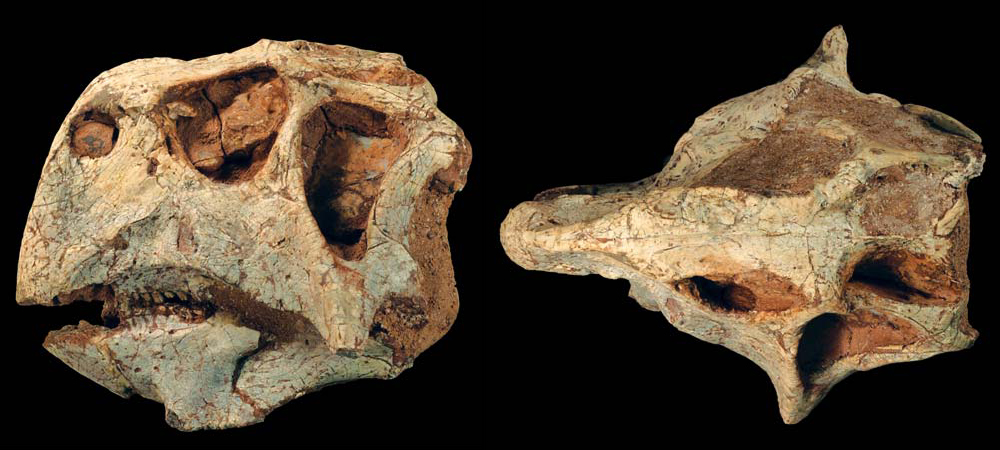
P. lujiatunensis skull LHPV 1 from the left and above

The brain of P. lujiatunensis is well known; a study on the anatomy and functionality of three specimens was published in 2007. Until the study, it was generally thought the brain of Psittacosaurus would have been similar to other ceratopsians with low encephalization quotients. Russell and Zhao (1996) believed "the small brain size of psittacosaurs implies a very restrictive behavioural repertoire relative to that of modern mammals of similar body size". However, the 2007 study dispelled this theory when it found the brain to be more advanced. There is generally negative allometry for brain size with development in vertebrates, but this was shown not to be true in Psittacosaurus. The EQ score for P. lujiatunensis is 0.31, significantly higher than genera such as Triceratops. A higher EQ correlates with more complex behaviour, and various dinosaurs have high EQs, similar to birds, which range from 0.36 to 2.98. Thus, Psittacosaurus behaviour could have been as complex as that in Tyrannosaurus, whose EQ ranges from 0.30 to 0.38. Behaviours influenced by high EQs include nest-building, parental care, and bird-like sleeping, some of which have been shown to be present in Psittacosaurus.

Life reconstruction of P. mongoliensis

The senses of Psittacosaurus can be inferred from the endocast. Large olfactory bulbs are present, indicating the genus had an acute sense of smell. The size of these bulbs are comparable to large predatory theropods, although they likely evolved to avoid predators instead of to seek out prey. The scleral rings in reptiles directly show the size of the eyeball. The rings are not well preserved in Psittacosaurus, with one individual preserving them likely contracted postmortem, but if they are similar to those of Protoceratops, Psittacosaurus would have had large eyes and acute vision. The curvature of the semicircular canals is related to the agility of reptiles, and the large curved canals in Psittacosaurus show that the genus was much more agile than later ceratopsians. Comparisons between the scleral rings of Psittacosaurus and modern birds and reptiles suggest that it may have been cathemeral, active throughout the day and for short intervals at night.

Ford and Martin (2010) proposed that Psittacosaurus was semi-aquatic, swimming with its tail like a crocodile, and paddling and kicking. They based their interpretation on evidence including: the lacustrine (lake) depositional setting of many specimens; the position of the nostrils and eyes; interpretations of the motions of the arms and legs; tails with long chevrons (and with the bristles on the tail interpreted as possibly skin-covered, forming a fin), providing a propulsive surface; and the presence of gastroliths, interpreted as ballast. They further suggested that some species of Psittacosaurus were more terrestrial than others.

=== Diet ===
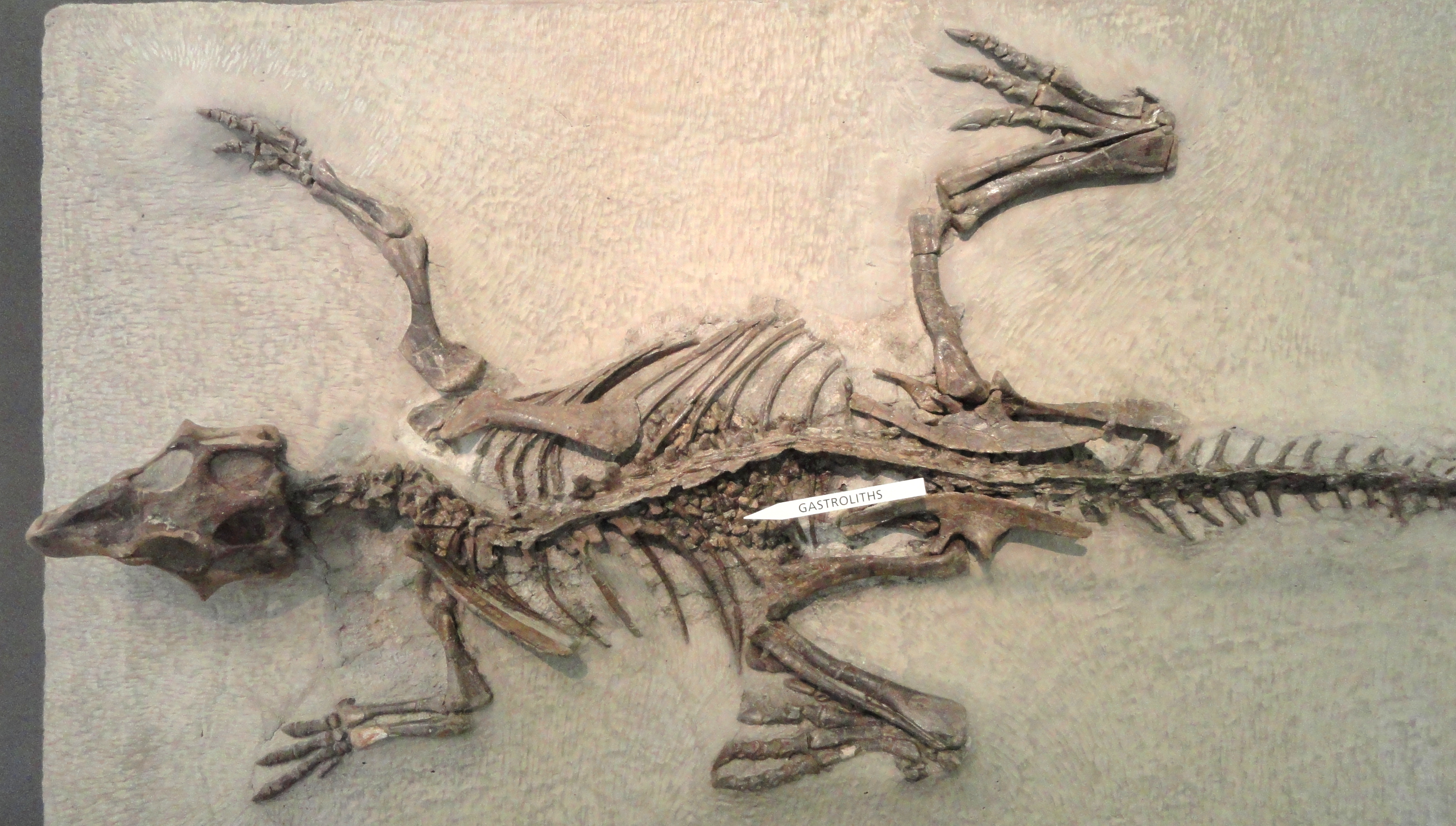
P. mongoliensis specimen AMNH 6254 with gastroliths in its stomach region (arrow)

Psittacosaurs had self-sharpening teeth that would have been useful for cropping and slicing tough plant material. Unlike later ceratopsians, they did not have teeth suitable for grinding or chewing their food. Instead, they used gastroliths—stones swallowed to wear down food as it passed through the digestive system. Sometimes numbering more than fifty, these stones are occasionally found in the abdominal cavities of psittacosaurs, and may have been stored in a gizzard, as in modern birds.

Unlike many other dinosaurs, psittacosaurs had akinetic skulls: that is to say, the upper and lower jaws each behaved as a single unit, without internal joints. The only joint was the jaw joint itself, and psittacosaurs could slide their lower jaws forward and backward on the joint, permitting a shearing action. Unlike most ceratopsians, their beaks did not form curved tips, but were instead rounded and flattened. If the jaws were aligned, the beaks could be used to crop objects, but if the lower jaw was retracted so that the lower beak was inside the upper beak, the jaws may have served a nutcracking function. A nut- or seed-rich diet would also match well with the gastroliths often seen in well-preserved psittacosaur skeletons.

=== Limb function ===
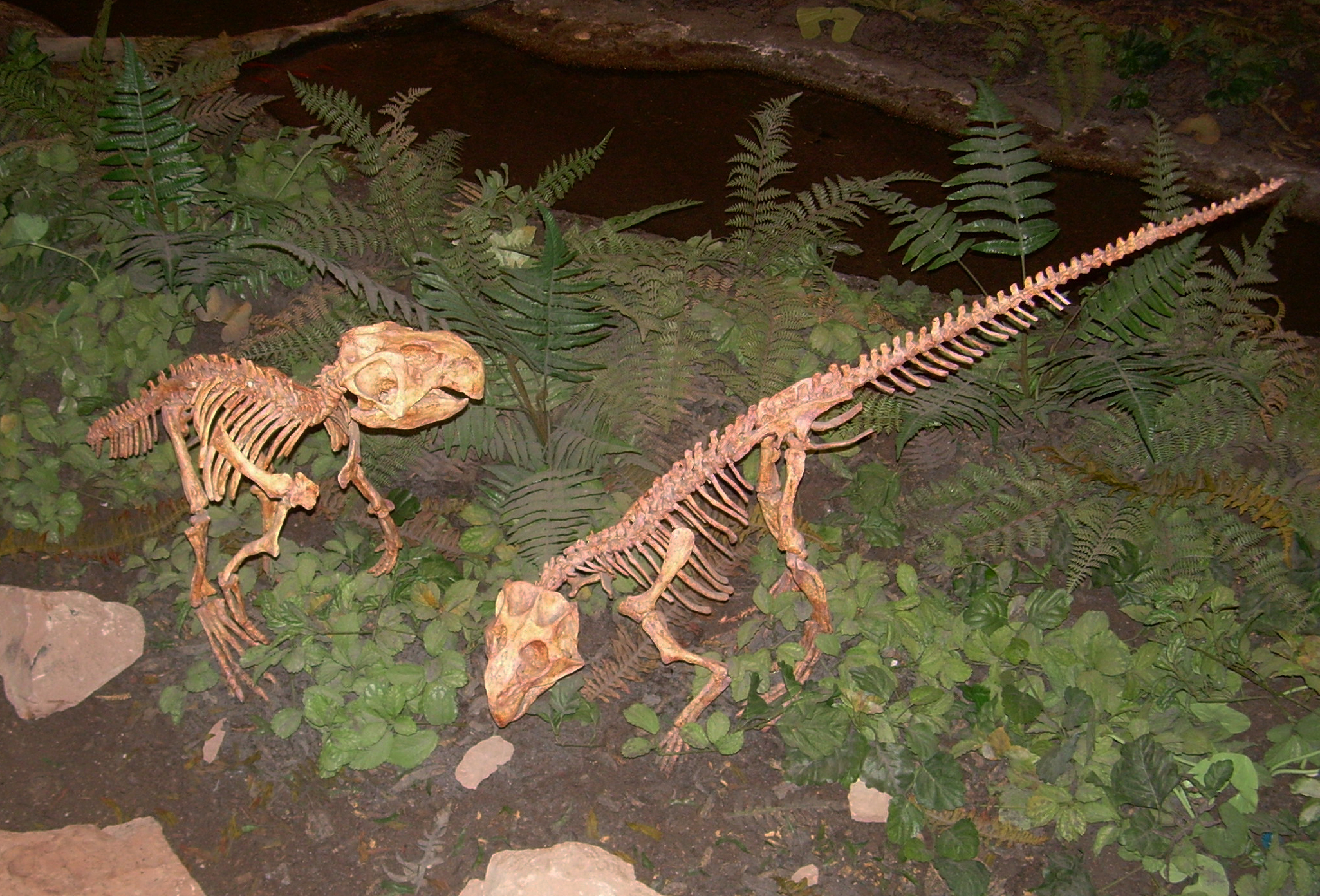
Mounted P. mongoliensis skeleton casts in upright and crouching poses

Studies by Phil Senter in 2007 conducted on P. neimongoliensis and P. mongoliensis concluded that the forelimbs of these taxa (and likely those of other Psittacosaurus species) were too short (only about 58% as long as the hindlimbs) to reach the ground, and their range of motion indicates they could neither be pronated nor generate propulsive force for locomotion, suggesting that Psittacosaurus was entirely bipedal. The forelimbs were also too short to be used in digging or bringing food to the mouth, and Senter suggested that if Psittacosaurus found it necessary to dig depressions in the ground it may have used its hindlimbs instead. The forelimbs could be used for two-handed grasping of objects or scratching the body, but due to their extremely limited flexibility and reach, they could have only been used to grasp objects very close to the belly or sides of the animal and could have scratched only the belly, flank and knees. Even though the hands could not reach the mouth, Psittacosaurus could have still used them to carry nesting material or food to a desired location.

However, Psittacosaurus may not have been entirely bipedal for its entire lifespan. Taking sections from the limb bones of 16 specimens of Psittacosaurus, ranging in age from less than a year old to ten-year-old adults, Qi Zhao from the University of Bristol found that Psittacosaurus was probably secondarily bipedal. The infants' front limbs grew at faster rates than the hind limbs at between hatching and three years of age. At the age of between four and six years, arm growth slowed and leg growth accelerated as the animal became mature. At this stage, Psittacosaurs would switch to a bipedal stance. These findings further reveal that the ancestor of Psittacosaurus was likely quadrupedal and eventually gained the ability to become bipedal as it evolved, with the young retaining the quadrupedal gait of the ancestor in question. These findings also lead to the hypothesis that many such dinosaur families may have evolved along this path at some point in their evolution.

=== Growth rate ===
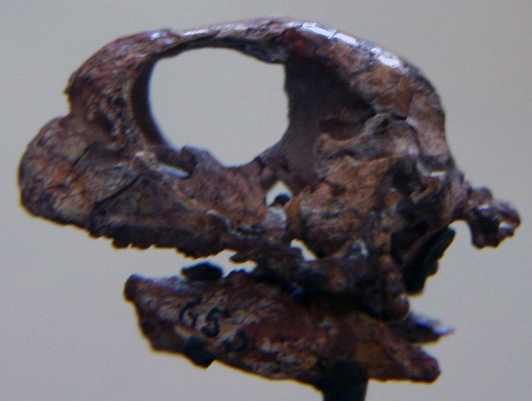
Skull of a hatchling P. mongoliensis, AMNH

Several juvenile Psittacosaurus have been found. The smallest is a P. mongoliensis hatchling conserved in the American Museum of Natural History (AMNH), which is only 11 to 13 centimetres (4–5 inches) long, with a skull 2.4 centimetres (0.94 in) in length. Another hatchling skull at the AMNH is only 4.6 centimetres (1.8 in) long. Both specimens are from Mongolia. Juveniles discovered in the Yixian Formation are approximately the same age as the larger AMNH specimen.

A histological examination of P. mongoliensis has determined the growth rate of these animals. The smallest specimens in the study were estimated at three years old and less than 1 kilogram (2.2 lb), while the largest were nine years old and weighed almost 20 kilograms (44 lb). This indicates relatively rapid growth compared to most reptiles and marsupial mammals, but slower than modern birds and placental mammals. An age determination study performed on the fossilized remains of P. mongoliensis by using growth ring counts suggest that the longevity of the basal ceratopsian was 10 to 11 years.

=== Gregarious juveniles ===
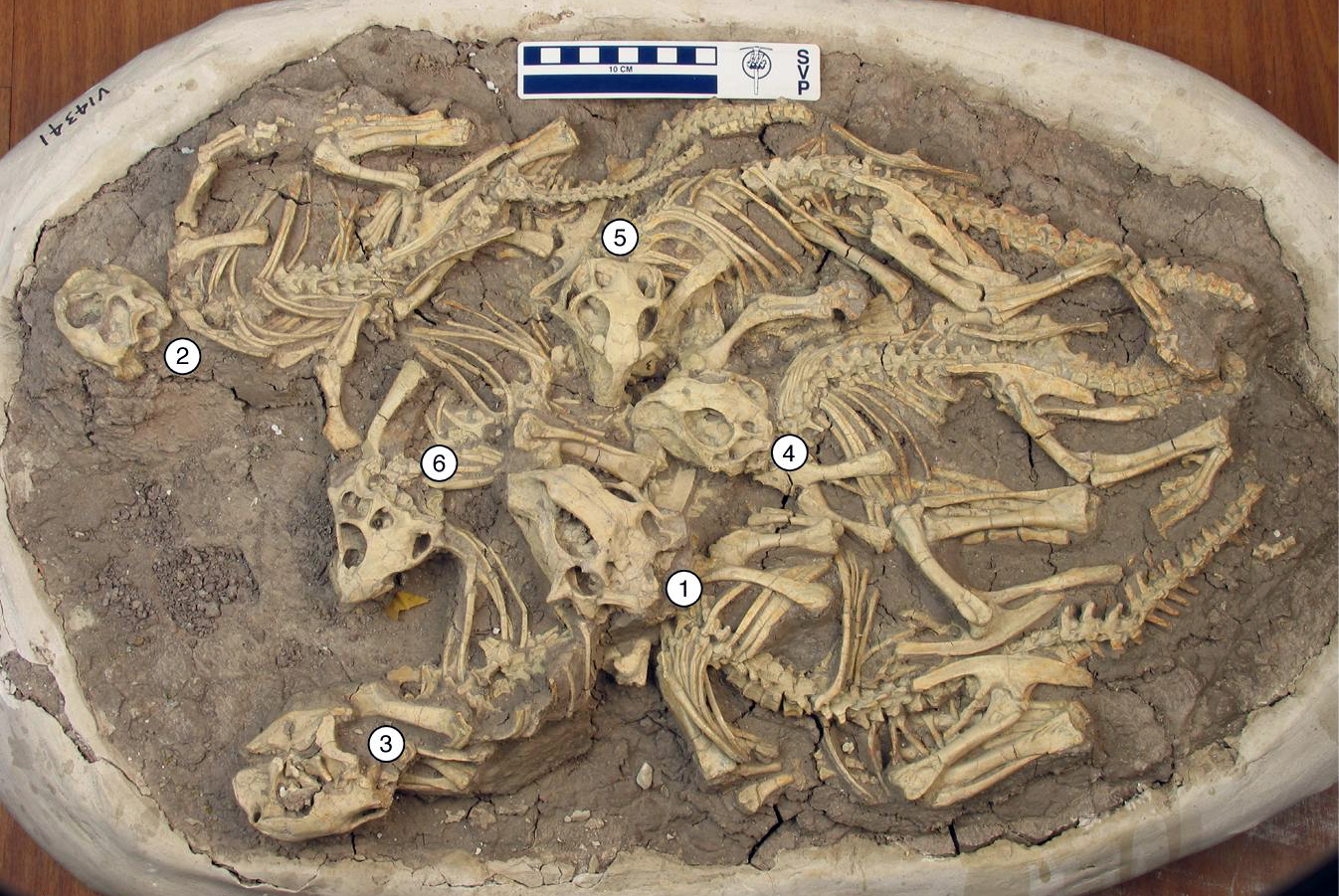
Group of six juveniles that died together – specimen IVPP V14341

The find of a herd of six Psittacosaurus individuals killed and buried by a volcanic mudflow indicates the presence of at least two age groups from two distinct clutches gathered together. This find has been taken as evidence for group fidelity and gregariousness extending beyond the nest; the earliest such evidence for any ceratopsian. Even very young psittacosaur teeth appear worn, indicating they chewed their own food and may have been precocial. Another juvenile-only cluster shows that specimens of different ages grouped together. These juveniles may have associated together as a close knit, mixed-age herd either for protection, to enhance their foraging, or as putative helpers at the parental nest. There is no evidence for parental care.

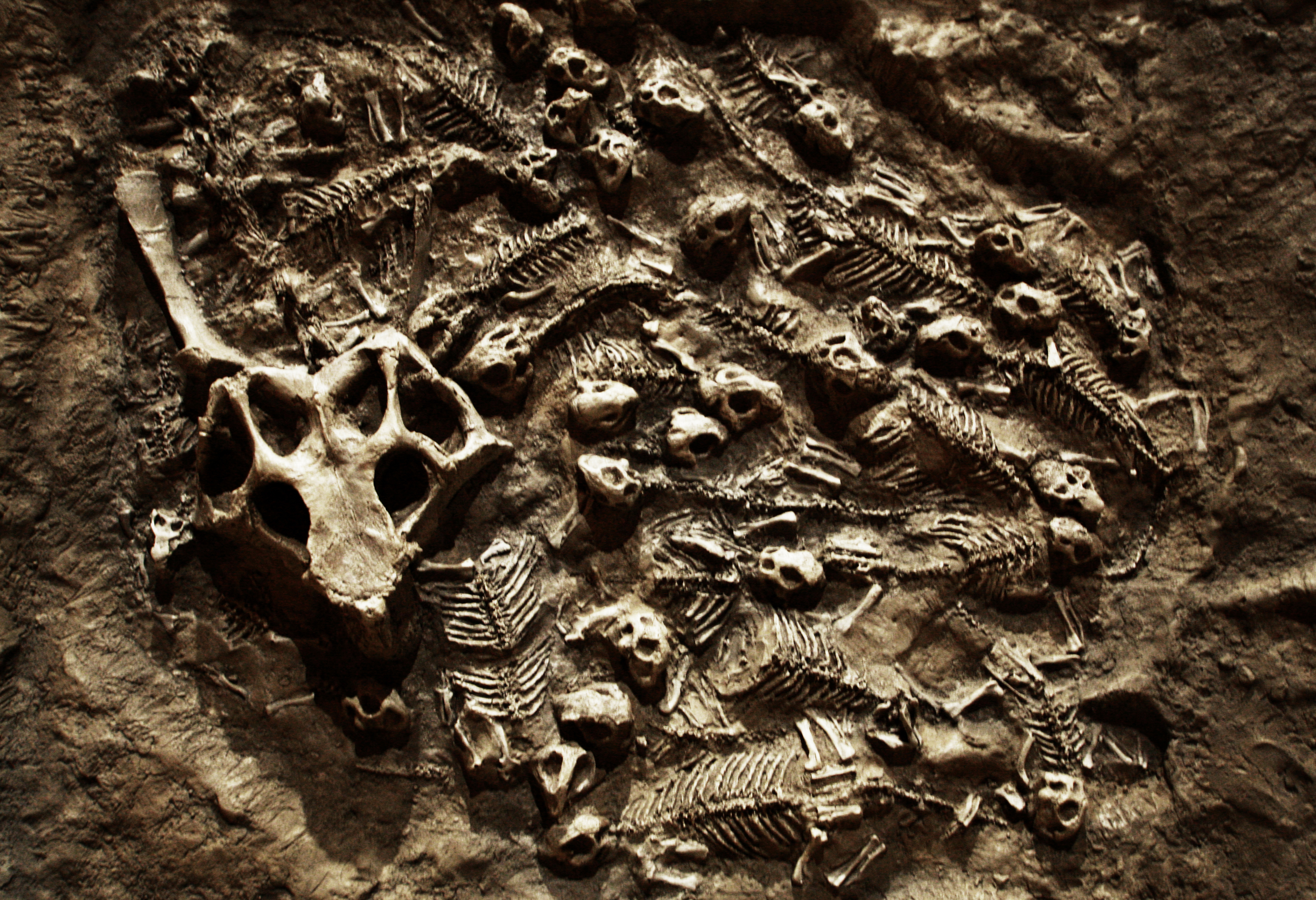
Cast of a six-year-old specimen associated with juveniles

In 2004, a specimen found in the Yixian Formation was claimed as evidence for parental care in dinosaurs. The specimen DNHM D2156 consists of 34 articulated juvenile Psittacosaurus skeletons, closely associated with the skull of an adult. The juveniles, all approximately the same age, are intertwined in a group underneath the adult, although all 34 skulls are positioned above the mass of bodies, as they would have been in life. This suggests that the animals were alive at the time of burial, which must have been extremely rapid, perhaps due to the collapse of a burrow. However, a 2013 paper pointed out that the adult specimen did not belong with the nest, its skull having no sedimentary connection to the main slab where the juveniles occurred, but had been glued onto it. This artificial association led to the inference that the skull belonged to an individual, possibly a "mother", that was providing parental care for the 34 juveniles—a claim that is unfounded. Furthermore, the adult was also shown to be six years old, whereas histological studies have shown P. mongoliensis was unable to breed until it reached ten years of age. It is also unlikely that a single female would have so many offspring at one time. A 2014 analysis of the same specimen supported the association and concluded that the proximity of the six-year-old specimen to the post-hatchlings may indicate post-hatchling cooperation, making the six-year-old specimen a possible caretaker.

In 2025, Wang and colleagues reported a specimen consisting of 13 juvenile Psittacosaurus skeletons (JLU DERC-Z0007), with nearly every individual containing gastroliths.

=== Pathology ===
Out of the hundreds of known Psittacosaurus specimens, only one has been described to possess any sort of pathology. The specimen in question, consisting of a complete adult skeleton and tentatively assigned to P. mongoliensis, was found in the lower beds of the Yixian Formation. There is no sign of a bone fracture, but very clear signs of an infection can be seen near the midpoint of the right fibula. The bone exhibits a large round pit, evidence of necrosis due to a lack of blood supply to the region. The pit is surrounded by a massive amount of swelling along the lower third of the bone. This large amount of bone deposited around the injury indicates that the animal survived for quite a while despite the injury and subsequent infection. As psittacosaurids were bipedal animals, a similar injury to a weight-bearing bone in the leg would most likely have been fatal. Unlike the femur and tibia, the fibula is not a weight-bearing bone, so this animal would still have been able to walk to some extent. The source of the injury remains unknown.

=== Predation ===
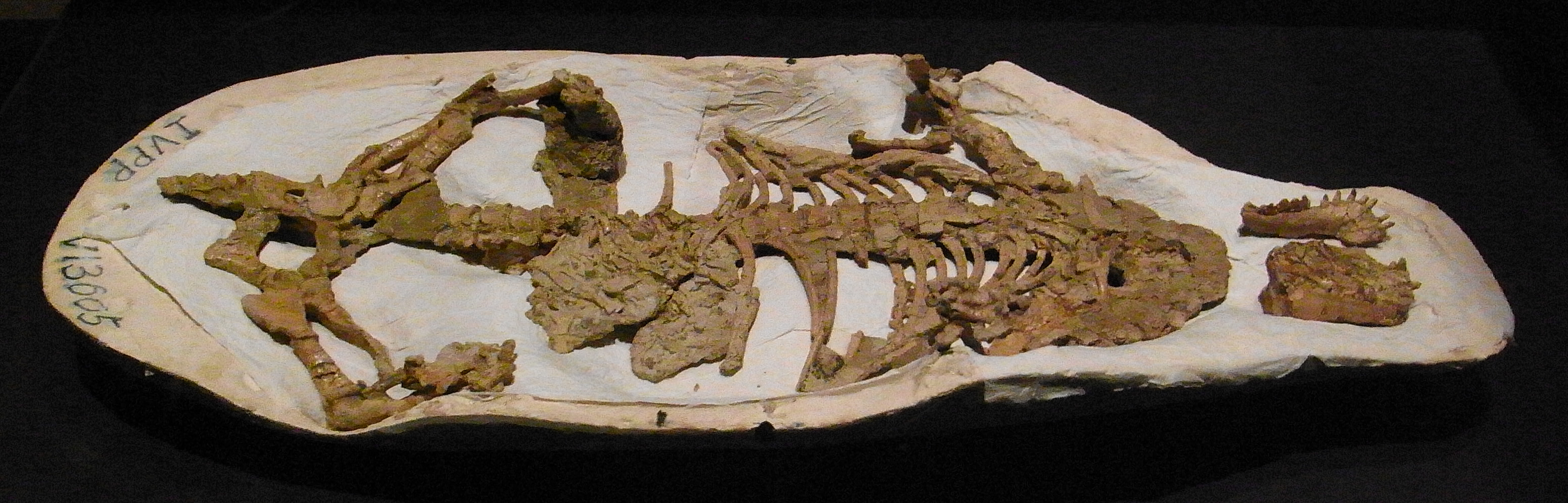
Fossil of Repenomamus robustus, juvenile Psittacosaurus remains preserved in its stomach

Another fossil from the Yixian Formation provides direct evidence of Psittacosaurus as a prey animal. One skeleton of Repenomamus robustus, a large triconodont mammal, is preserved with the remains of a juvenile Psittacosaurus in its abdominal cavity. Several of the juvenile's bones are still articulated, indicating that the carnivorous mammal swallowed its prey in large chunks. This specimen is notable in that it is the first-known example of Mesozoic mammals preying on live dinosaurs. Heavy predation on juvenile Psittacosaurus may have resulted in R-selection, the production of more numerous offspring to counteract this loss.

== Paleochronology ==
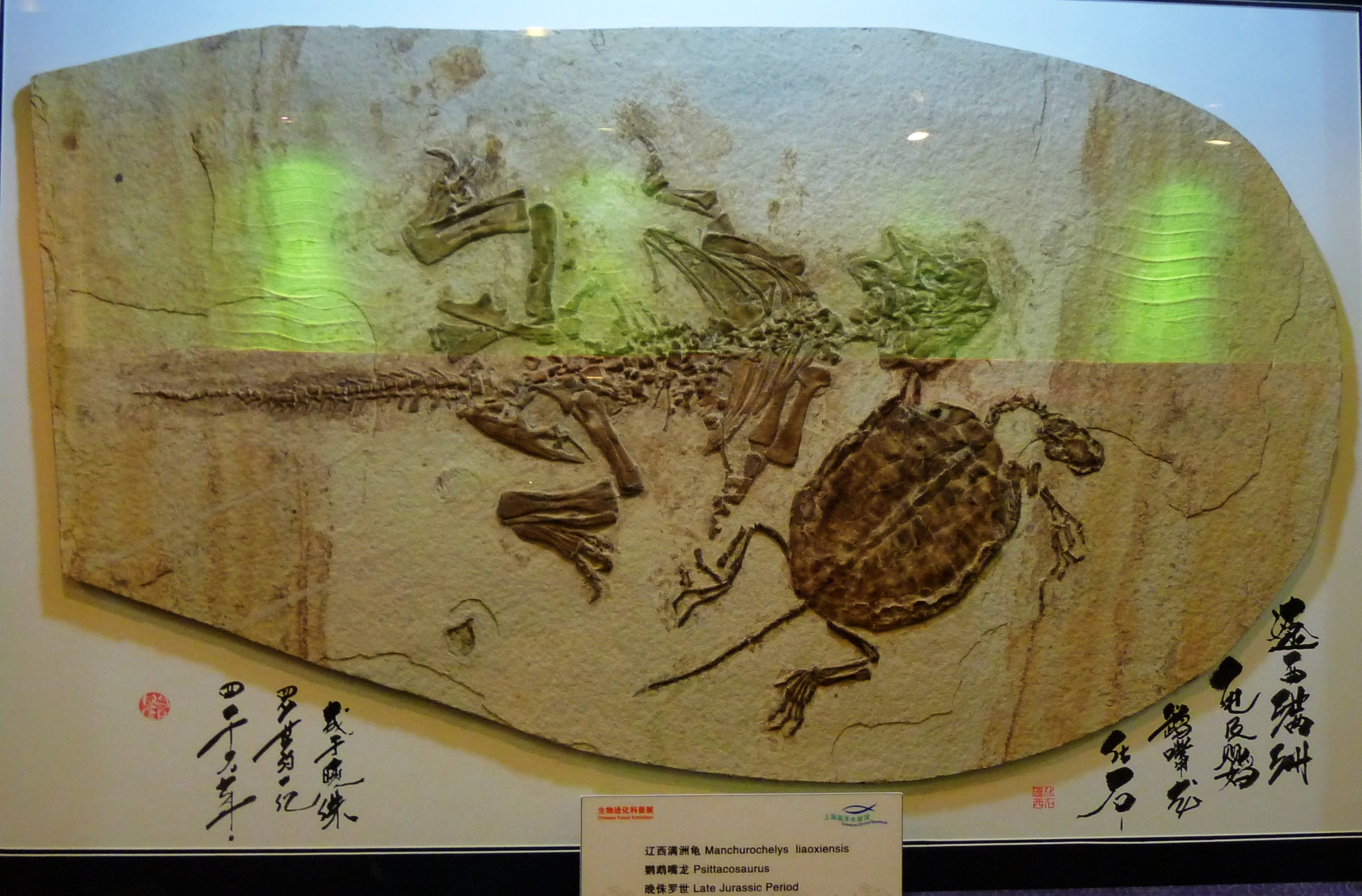
Specimen alongside Ordosemys, Shanghai Ocean Aquarium, China

Psittacosaurus is known from hundreds of individual specimens, of which over 75 have been assigned to the type species, P. mongoliensis. All Psittacosaurus fossils discovered so far have been found in Early Cretaceous sediments in Asia, from southern Siberia to northern China, and possibly as far south as Thailand. The most common age of geologic formations bearing Psittacosaurus fossils is from the late Barremian through Albian stages of the Early Cretaceous, or approximately 125 to 105 mya (million years ago). Many terrestrial sedimentary formations of this age in Mongolia and northern China have produced fossils of Psittacosaurus, leading to the definition of this time period in the region as the Psittacosaurus biochron.

The earliest known species is P. lujiatunensis, found in the lowest beds of the Yixian Formation. Over 200 specimens attributed to this genus have been recovered from these and other beds of the Yixian, the age of which is the subject of much debate. Although many early studies using radiometric dating put the Yixian in the Jurassic Period, tens of millions of years outside of the expected temporal range of Psittacosaurus, most recent work dates it to the Early Cretaceous. Using argon–argon dating, a team of Chinese scientists dated the lowest beds in the formation to about 128 mya, and the highest to approximately 122 mya. A more recent Chinese study, using uranium–lead dating, suggests that the lower beds are younger, approximately 123.2 mya, while agreeing with an age of 122 mya for the upper beds.

== See also ==
- Dinosaur coloration
- Timeline of ceratopsian research
