= Castle Peak =

Castle Peak may refer to:

== Mountains ==
- Castle Peak (Alaska), Wrangell Mountains
- Castle Peak (California), Sierra Nevada range
- Castle Peak (Colorado), Elk Mountains
- Castle Peak (Sawatch Range), Sawatch Range, Colorado
- Castle Peak (Idaho), White Cloud Mountains, Idaho
- Castle Peak (Texas)
- Castle Peak (Washington), North Cascades
- Castle Peak (Cowlitz County, Washington)
- Castle Peak (Hong Kong) (Chinese: 青山, sometimes transliterated Tsing Shan), a mountain in the western New Territories of Hong Kong
  - Castle Peak Bay (青山灣), a bay outside Tuen Mun, near Castle Peak, Hong Kong
  - Castle Peak Beach (青山灣泳灘), a gazetted beach in Tuen Mun, Hong Kong
  - Castle Peak Hospital (青山醫院), a psychiatric hospital in Hong Kong, to the east of Castle Peak at Tuen Mun
  - Castle Peak Road (青山道 and 青山公路), a road in Hong Kong running north from Kowloon
  - Tsing Shan Monastery (青山禪院), a monastery at the foot of Castle Peak, Hong Kong
- Castle Peak (Antarctica)

== Other uses ==
- Castle Peak, in El Escorpión Park, San Fernando Valley, California
- AMD Castle Peak, CPUs of the Zen 2 Threadripper line by Advanced Micro Devices
