= Castle Peak (Cowlitz County, Washington) =

Mountain in Washington (state), United States

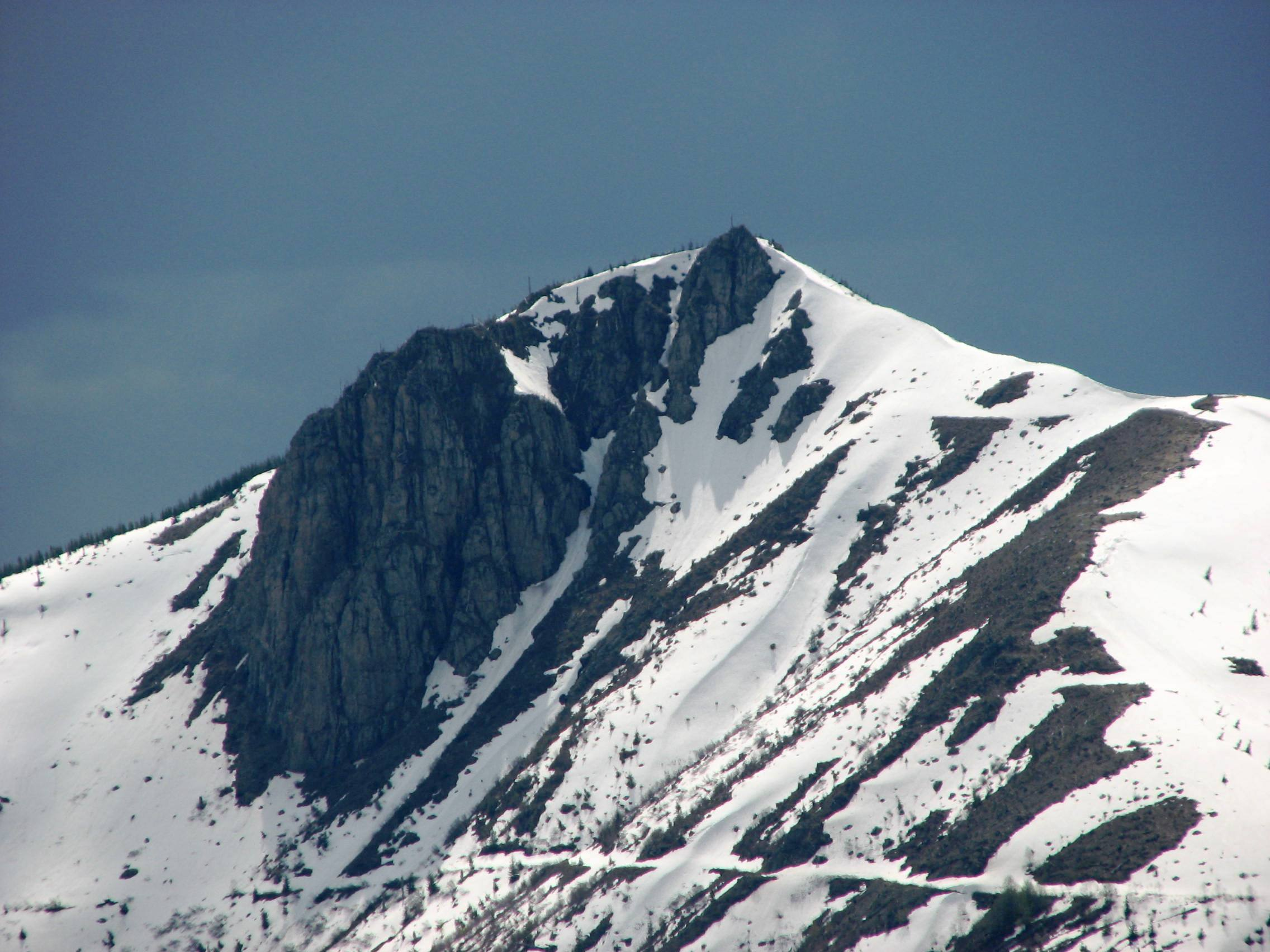
- East-northeast aspect

Highest point
- Elevation: 4,621 ft (1,408 m)
- Prominence: 521 ft (159 m)
- Parent peak: Spud Mountain (4,740 ft)
- Isolation: 1.11 mi (1.79 km)
- Coordinates: 46°14′48″N 122°17′50″W

Geography
- Location within Washington (state) Location within the United States
- Country: United States
- State: Washington
- County: Cowlitz
- Protected area: Mount St. Helens National Volcanic Monument
- Parent range: Cascade Range
- Topo map: USGS Goat Mountain

Geology
- Rock age: Tertiary
- Rock type: Diorite
- Volcanic arc: Cascade Volcanic Arc

Castle Peak is a 4,621-foot-elevation (1,408-meter) mountain summit in Cowlitz County, Washington, United States.

== Description ==
Castle Peak ranks as the third-highest summit in Cowlitz County. It is located on the boundary shared by Mount St. Helens National Volcanic Monument and Gifford Pinchot National Forest. Castle Peak is part of the Cascade Range, and it is situated one mile (1.6 km) west of Castle Lake. Topographic relief is significant as the summit rises 2,000 feet (610 meters) above Castle Lake in one mile. Precipitation runoff from Castle Peak drains into tributaries of the South Fork and the North Fork Toutle River. The nearest higher neighbor is Spud Mountain, 1.13 mi (1.82 km) to the west-northwest, and Mount St. Helens rises 5.7 miles (9.2 km) to the southeast. The mountain's toponym was officially adopted in 1992 by the U.S. Board on Geographic Names.

== Geology ==
The history of the formation of the Cascade Mountains dates back millions of years ago to the late Eocene Epoch. Geological events occurring many years ago created the diverse topography and drastic elevation changes over the Cascade Range leading to various climate differences. During the Pleistocene period dating back over two million years ago, glaciation advancing and retreating repeatedly scoured and shaped the landscape. With the North American Plate overriding the Pacific Plate, episodes of volcanic igneous activity occurred. The lateral blast from the 1980 eruption of Mount St. Helens was directed toward Castle Peak and stripped the vegetation from the slopes. Due to Mount Saint Helens' proximity to Castle Peak, volcanic ash is common in the area.

== Climate ==
Castle Peak is located in the marine west coast climate zone of western North America. Most weather fronts originating in the Pacific Ocean travel northeast toward the Cascade Mountains. As fronts approach, they are forced upward by the peaks of the Cascade Range (Orographic lift), causing them to drop their moisture in the form of rain or snowfall onto the Cascades. As a result, the west side of the Cascades experiences high precipitation, especially during the winter months in the form of snowfall. During winter months, weather is usually cloudy, but due to high pressure systems over the Pacific Ocean that intensify during summer months, there is often little or no cloud cover during the summer. The months July through September offer the most favorable weather for viewing or climbing this peak.

== See also ==
- Geology of the Pacific Northwest
- List of mountain peaks of Washington (state)

== Gallery ==
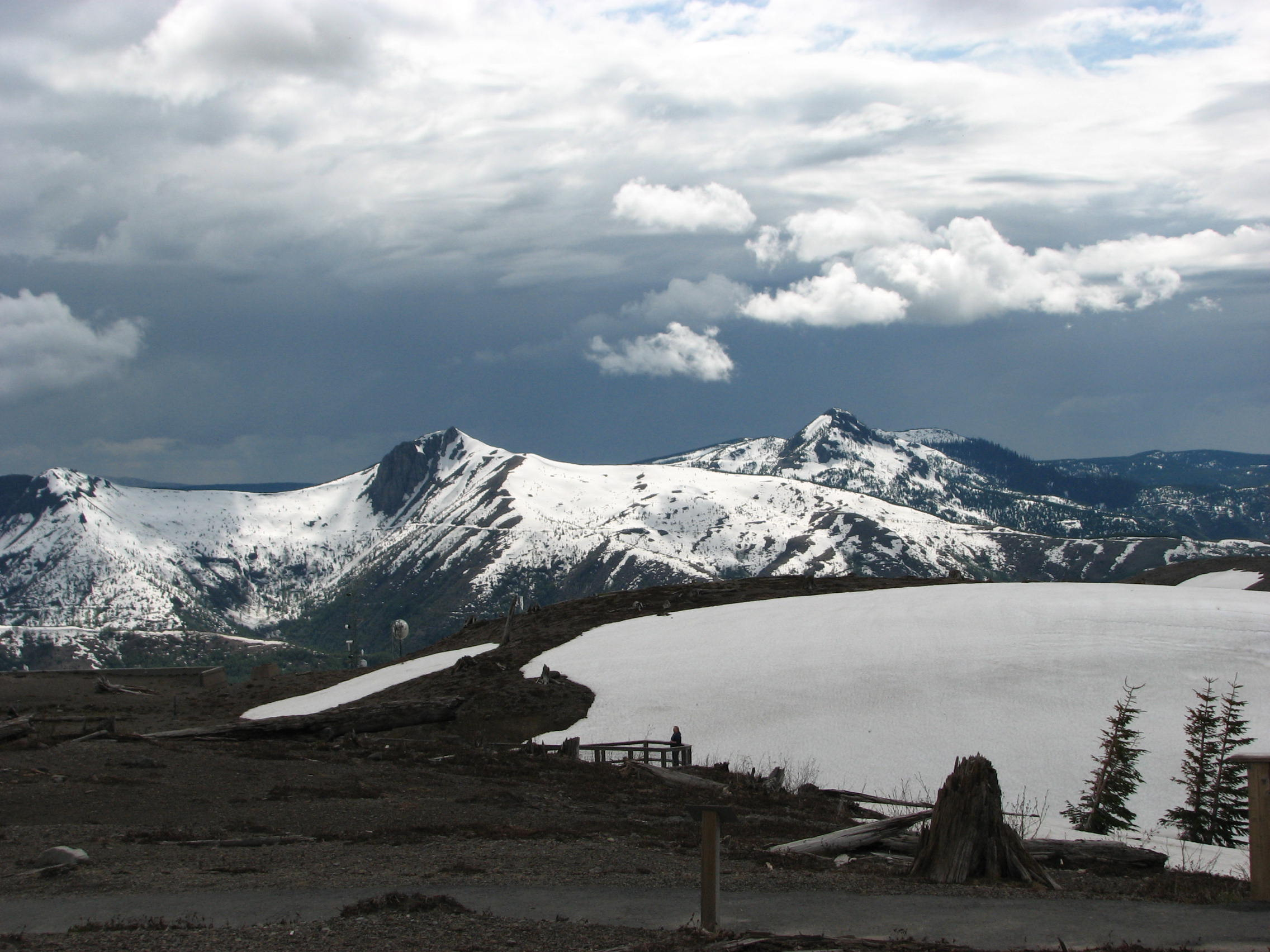
Castle Peak (left) and Spud Mountain (behind, right) viewed from Johnston Ridge

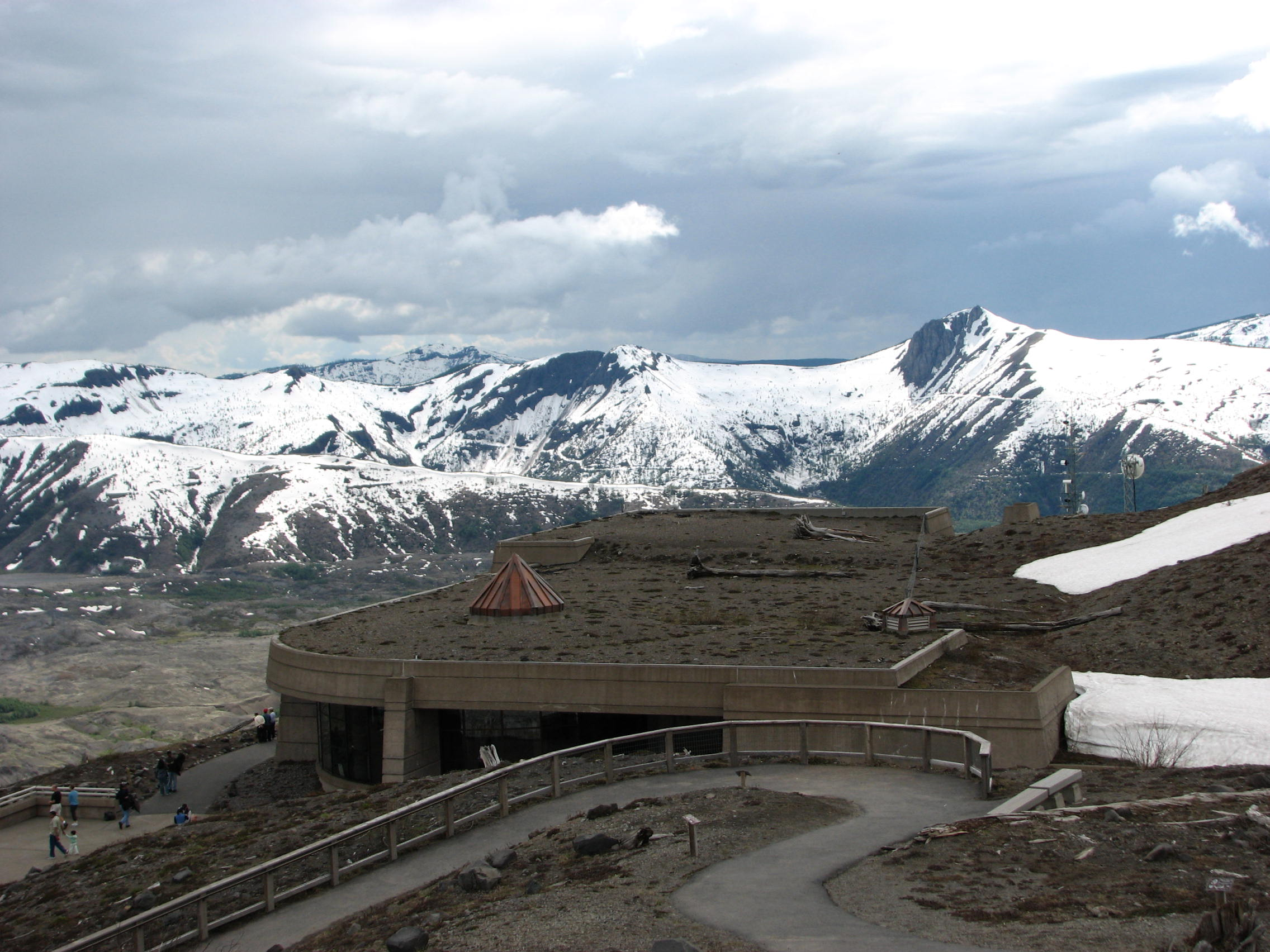
Castle Peak (right) viewed from Johnston Ridge Observatory
