= Aoyama Harp =

Japanese harp manufacturer

Aoyama Harp (青山ハープ, Aoyama Hāpu) is a Japanese manufacturer of pedal (concert) harps and folk (lever) harps. Founded as the Aoyama Musical Instrument Manufacturing Company by Jitarō Aoyama in 1897 in Fukui, later generations of the family began the commercial manufacture of folk harps in the 1960s. The manufacture of pedal harps was begun by Kenzo Aoyama, the present head of the company. He began the productions of Grand Concert Harps. The Aoyama harp factory, which was finished in 1992, includes a museum of antique harps as well as a concert hall.
