= Aoyama (surname) =

Aoyama (written: 青山 literally "blue mountain") is a Japanese surname. Notable people with the surname include:

- Akira Aoyama (青山 士; 1878–1963), Japanese civil engineer
- Ayari Aoyama (青山 綾里; born 1982), Japanese former butterfly swimmer
- Gosho Aoyama (青山 剛昌; born 1963), Japanese manga artist (birthname: Yoshimasa Aoyama)
- Hikaru Aoyama (青山 ひかる; born 1993), Japanese gravure idol and tarento
- Hiroshi Aoyama (青山 博一; born 1981), Japanese motorcycle racer
- Jun Aoyama (青山 隼; born 1988), Japanese footballer
- Aoyama Kagemichi (青山 景通; 1819–1891), Japanese samurai
- Kei Aoyama (青山 景; 1979–2011), Japanese manga artist
- Mitsuko Aoyama (青山 みつこ; 1874–1941), one of the first Japanese people to immigrate to Europe
- Nagisa Aoyama (青山 なぎさ; born 1998), Japanese voice actress and singer
- Nanae Aoyama (青山 七恵; born 1983), Japanese writer
- Naoaki Aoyama (青山 直晃; born 1986), Japanese footballer
- Shinji Aoyama (青山 真治; 1964–2022), Japanese film director
- Shuhei Aoyama (青山 周平; born 1984), Japanese motorcycle racer
- Shuko Aoyama (青山 修子; born 1987), Japanese tennis player
- Aoyama Tanemichi (青山 胤通; 1859–1917), Japanese medical scientist and doctor
- Thelma Aoyama (青山 テルマ; born 1987), Japanese pop singer
- Tōko Aoyama (青山 桐子; born 1976), Japanese voice actress
- Yoshino Aoyama (青山 吉能; born 1996), Japanese voice actress
- Yutaka Aoyama (青山 穣; born 1965), Japanese voice actor

== Fictional characters ==
- Hajime Aoyama, character in Ghost Stories (anime)
- Masaya Aoyama of Tokyo Mew Mew
- Motoko Aoyama of Love Hina
- Otaki Aoyama, character in the anime/manga series Oh My Goddess!
- Shigeharu Aoyama, the main character in the Japanese film, Audition (film)
- Shougo Aoyama of Toei Animation's Yu-Gi-Oh! movie (not the movie aired in North America)
- Tessan Aoyama, a samurai in a folk version of a Japanese ghost story titled Banchō Sarayashiki
- Yuki Aoyama, character in Chance Pop Session
- Saborou Aoyama, The Blue Ranger from the 1982 Super Sentai Series Goggle V
- Yuga Aoyama, character in My Hero Academia
- Minoru Aoyama, an antagonist featured in Yakuza 5
- Chizuko Aoyama (青山 千鶴子), character in Taiwan Travelogue

== See also ==
- Aoyama clan
