= Castle Peak (Antarctica) =

Mountain in Antarctica

Castle Peak (67°0′S 65°53′W) is a prominent ice-covered peak, 2,380 metres (7,800 ft) high, standing immediately south of Murphy Glacier and close off the west side of Avery Plateau in Graham Land. It is shaped like a truncated cone with a rounded summit and rises more than 610 metres (2,000 ft) above the surrounding ice. It was first surveyed in 1946 by the Falkland Islands Dependencies Survey, and so named by them because of its resemblance to a ruined medieval castle.
