= Castle Peak (Texas) =

Hill in Taylor County, Texas, US

- Location within Texas

Highest point
- Elevation: 2,341 ft (714 m)
- Prominence: 291 ft (89 m)
- Parent peak: Miller Benchmark
- Coordinates: 32°21′59″N 99°59′58″W

Geography
- Location: Taylor County, Texas, U.S.
- Topo map: USGS View

Castle Peak is a mountain in western Texas 8 miles (13 km) south of Merkel in southwest Taylor County. Its peak is 2,341 feet (714 m) above sea level.
