= Qingshan Group =

Geological formation in Shandong, China

- Stratigraphic range: Barremian-Albian; ~129–101 Ma
- Type: Geological group
- Sub-units: Doushan Formation

Lithology
- Primary: Claystone, mudstone, sandstone
- Other: Tuff

Location
- Coordinates: 37.0°N 120.7°E
- Approximate paleocoordinates: 41.4°N 119.5°E
- Region: Shandong
- Country: China
- Qingshan Group (China) Qingshan Group (Shandong)

The Qingshan Group (simplified Chinese: 青山组; traditional Chinese: 青山組; pinyin: Qīngshān Zǔ) is a geological group in Shandong, China, whose strata date back to the Barremian to Albian stages of the Early Cretaceous. The group contains the Doushan Formation. Dinosaur remains are among the fossils that have been recovered from the formation.

== Fossil content ==
The following fossils were reported from the Doushan Formation:

- Pachygenys thlastesa
- Psittacosaurus sinensis - "More than [twenty] individuals,[five] complete skulls, [three] articulated skeletons."
- P. youngi "Partial skeleton with skull."
- Possible indeterminate dsungaripterid pterosaur remains
- Indeterminate titanosaur remains

== See also ==
- List of dinosaur-bearing rock formations
