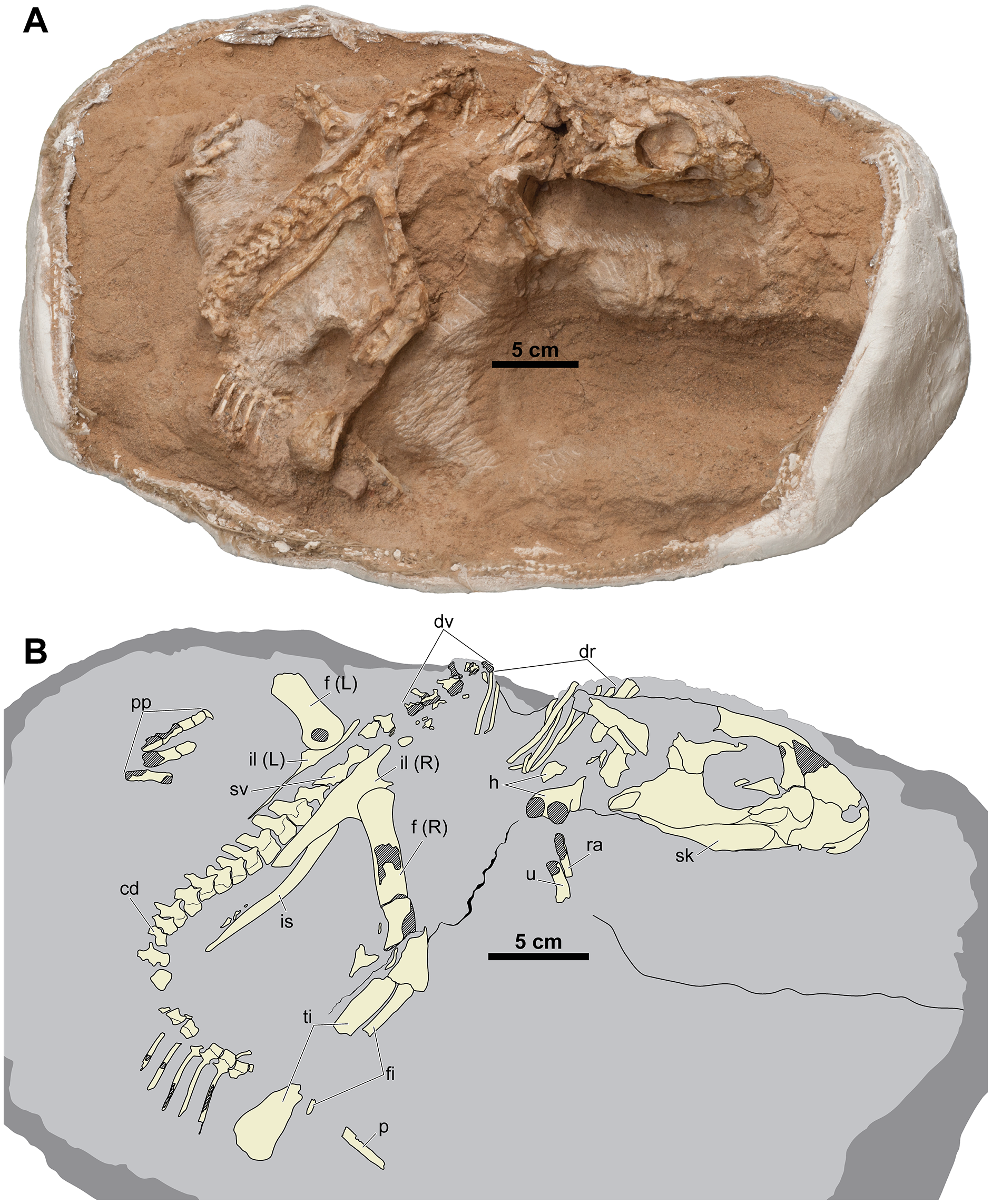
- Juvenile specimen referred to Yamaceratops (MPC-D 100/553)

Scientific classification
- Kingdom: Animalia
- Phylum: Chordata
- Class: Reptilia
- Clade: Dinosauria
- Clade: †Ornithischia
- Clade: †Ceratopsia
- Clade: †Neoceratopsia
- Genus: †Yamaceratops; Makovicky & Norell, 2006

Type species
- †Yamaceratops dorngobiensis Makovicky & Norell, 2006

= Yamaceratops =

Yamaceratops Temporal range: Late Cretaceous, ~Santonian

Extinct genus of ceratopsian dinosaur

Yamaceratops is a genus of primitive ceratopsian that lived during the Late Cretaceous in what is now Mongolia. The genus contains a single species, Y. dorngobiensis. It was a relatively small dinosaur, with an estimated length of 50 cm (1.6 ft) and weighing around 2 kg (4.4 lb).

== History of discovery ==
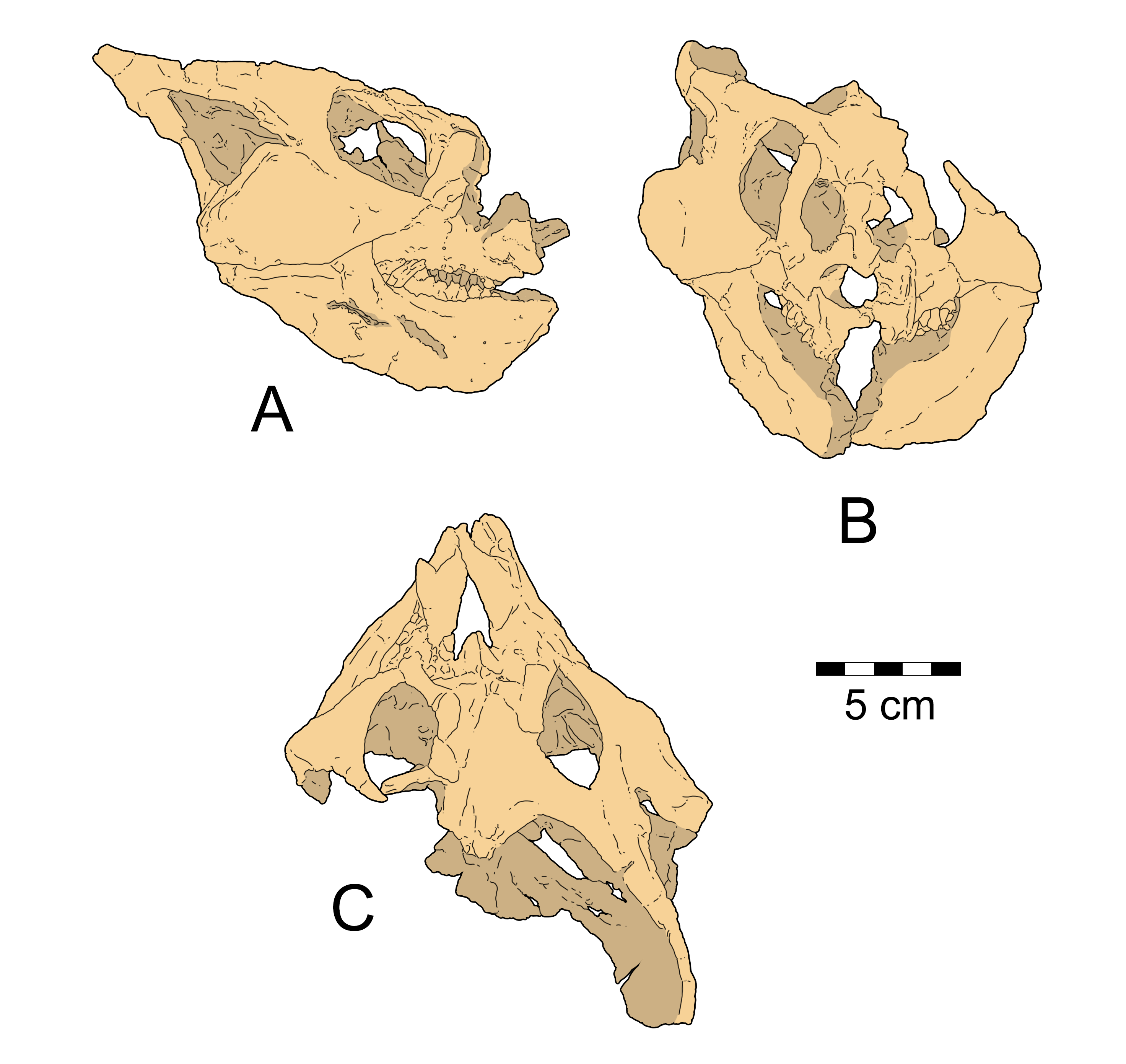
Holotype skull

The Yamaceratops fossil material is known from the Javkhlant Formation. The age of the type locality was originally thought to be the Early Cretaceous, but it was reevaluated in 2009 as the Late Cretaceous. The holotype IGM 100/1315 consists of a partial skull; other material has been found in 2002 and 2003 and has been ascribed to the genus.

The type species, Yamaceratops dorngobiensis, was described by P. J. Makovicky and M. A. Norell in September, 2006. The genus name refers to Yama, a Tibetan Buddhist deity; the species name to the Eastern Gobi.

A fossilized embryo found within an ornithischian eggshell from sediments where Yamaceratops is common, was referred to this genus in 2008. However, it was reidentified as a bird embryo in 2015.

In 2022, Minyoung Son and colleagues reported a juvenile specimen (MPC-D 100/553) of Yamaceratops found in 2014 at the Khugenetjavkhlant ("Khugenslavkhant") locality. This immature individual was approximately three years old, with an estimated body mass of 1.2 kg (2.6 lb). The overall body proportions with long hindlimbs indicate that Yamaceratops was a bipedal animal.

== Classification ==
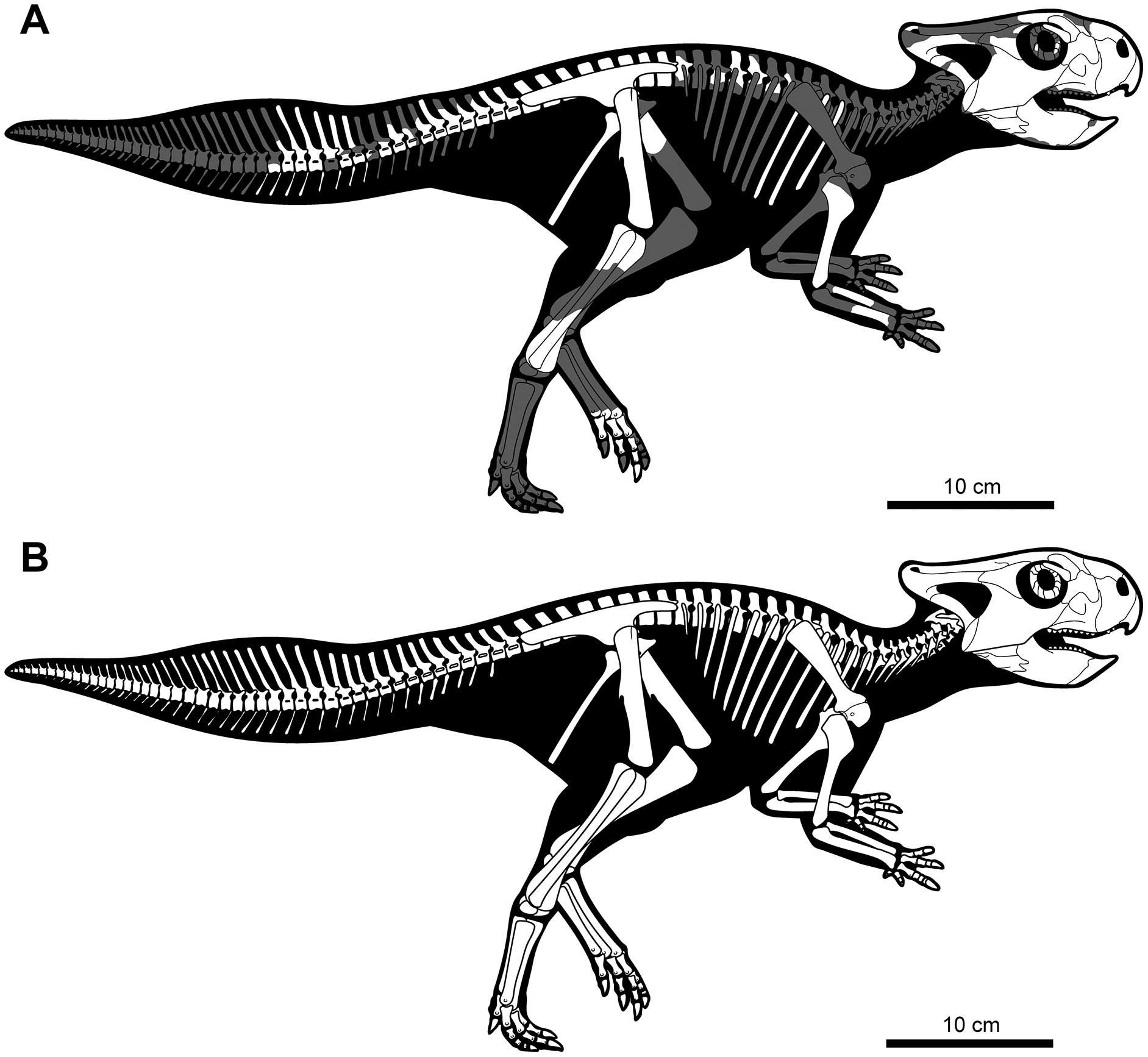
Skeletal reconstruction of MPC-D 100/553

The original describers of Yamaceratops considered this taxon to have had an intermediate phylogenetic position between Liaoceratops and Archaeoceratops within Neoceratopsia. Examination of the frill of Yamaceratops has convinced the authors that the frill was not used for display, and that the fossils "hint at a more complex evolutionary history for ceratopsian frills".

The cladogram below showing internal relationships of Ceratopsia is reproduced from Son et al. (2022), who recovered Yamaceratops as a sister taxon to the clade Euceratopsia which contains Leptoceratopsidae and Coronosauria.

- Ceratopsia
  - Psittacosaurus spp.
  - - - Chaoyangsauridae
        - Hualianceratops wucaiwanensis
        - Yinlong downsi
        - Chaoyangsaurus youngi
        - Xuanhuaceratops niei
  - Neoceratopsia
    - Stenopelix valdensis
    - Liaoceratops yanzigouensis
    - - - - Asiaceratops salsopaludalis
          - Mosaiceratops azumai
        - - Archaeoceratops oshimai
          - - - Auroraceratops rugosus
              - Graciliceratops mongoliensis
            - - Aquilops americanus
              - - - Yamaceratops dorngobiensis
                - Euceratopsia
                  - Leptoceratopsidae
                  - Coronosauria
                    - Protoceratopsidae
                    - Ceratopsoidea
                      - Ajkaceratops kozmai
                      - - Zuniceratops christopheri
                        - - Turanoceratops tardabilis
                          - - Diabloceratops eatoni
                            - Ceratopsidae

== See also ==
- Timeline of ceratopsian research
