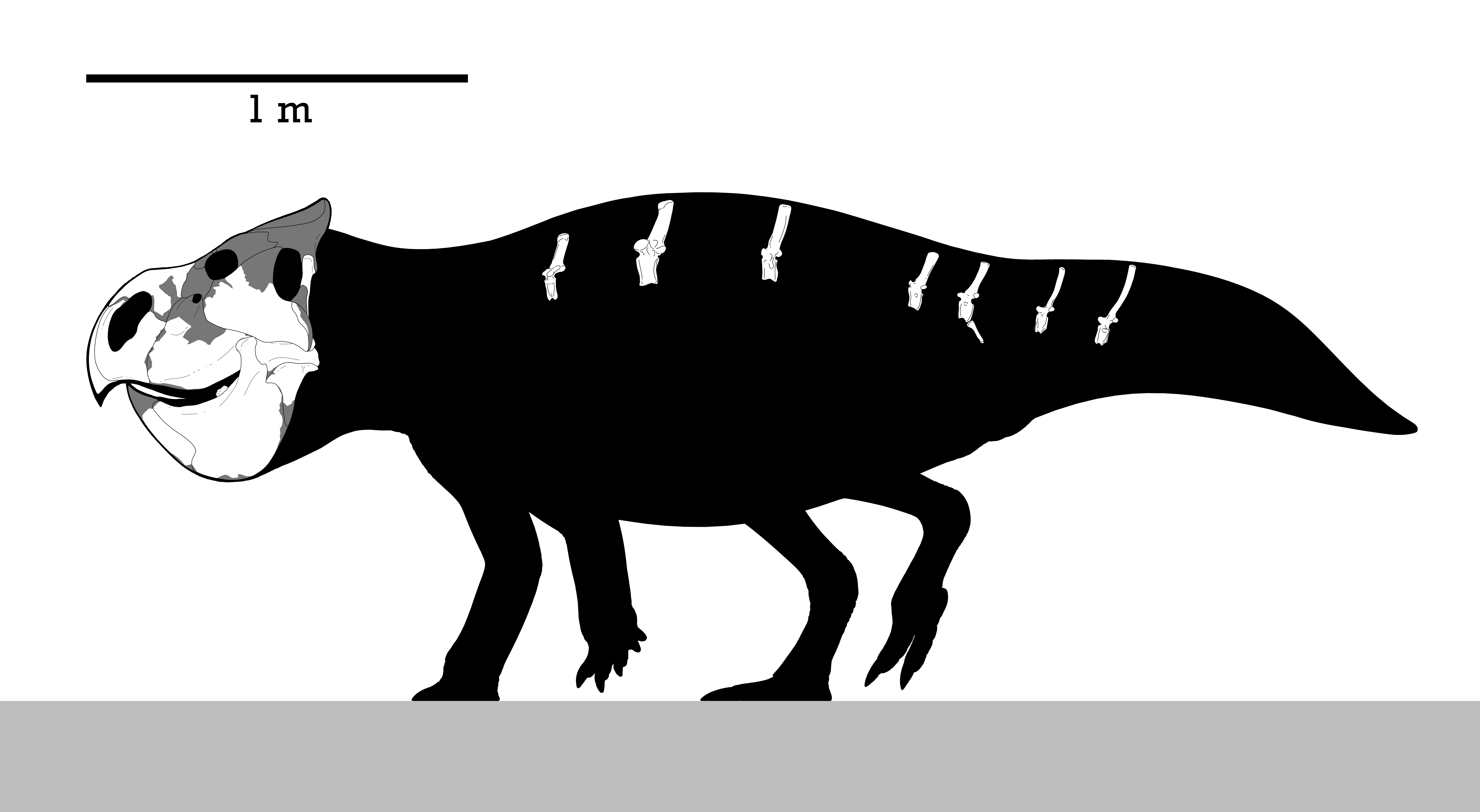
- Skeletal reconstruction

Scientific classification
- Kingdom: Animalia
- Phylum: Chordata
- Class: Reptilia
- Clade: Dinosauria
- Clade: †Ornithischia
- Clade: †Ceratopsia
- Family: †Leptoceratopsidae
- Genus: †Udanoceratops; Kurzanov, 1992
- Species: †U. tschizhovi

Binomial name
- †Udanoceratops tschizhovi Kurzanov, 1992

= Udanoceratops =

Udanoceratops Temporal range: Late Cretaceous, Campanian

Leptoceratopsid dinosaur genus from the Late Cretaceous

Udanoceratops (meaning "Udan-Sayr horned face") is a genus of large leptoceratopsid dinosaur that lived during the Late Cretaceous period of Mongolia. The holotype specimen, the partial skeleton of an adult with its bones encapsulated in calcium carbonate, was discovered in the 1980s as part of the Joint Soviet-Mongolian Paleontological Expedition, and was subsequently transported to the Paleontological Institute of the Russian Academy of Sciences. In 1992, it was described by palaeontologist Sergei Kurzanov. The sole species of Udanoceratops, also the type species, is Udanoceratops tschizhovi, named after a colleague of Kurzanov, D. O. Tschizhov. Additional remains have been assigned to Udanoceratops, though these may be misattributions.

Udanoceratops is the largest known leptoceratopsid, with some estimates placing it at about 4 m (13 ft) in length and 700 kg (1,500 lb) in weight. Its skull, though incomplete, probably was between 60–70 cm (24–28 in) in length, half as long again as that of the second-largest leptoceratopsid, Montanoceratops from North America. Udanoceratops' skull was far deeper and more robust than that of other leptoceratopsids, with larger nasal cavities and presumably a heavier beak. The projections on Udanoceratops' cheek bones would have supported a large patch of keratin. The bone of its snout above the beak was completely smooth, bearing neither the horns nor the slight tubercles of related taxa. Udanoceratops had a very deep and robust lower jaw (mandible), capable of exerting a powerful bite, possibly strong enough to cleave through bone; indeed, the holotype bears damage to its mandible which may have been caused by such a bite. The lower teeth bore shelves into which the upper set would have slotted when the jaw was closed. This would have resulted in a slicing action, similar to the system present in Archaeoceratops and Leptoceratops.

The postcranial skeleton of Udanoceratops is fragmentary, consisting primarily of a partial vertebral column and a few appendicular bones. Its tail was very tall and was somewhat compressed from side-to-side, as in many other leptoceratopsids and protoceratopsids. This and the shape of its unguals (the bones which would have supported its claws) has led to suggestions that Udanoceratops was semi-aquatic, but it is more likely that the shape of its unguals was an adaptation to supporting its weight on soft substrate such as sand dunes. Similarly, while it has been suggested that Udanoceratops could have run bipedally, this appears to be unlikely. If it did run, it likely would have done so on all fours, and would have been significantly slower than its smaller relatives. Udanoceratops is known from the Djadochta Formation of Mongolia, which is well known for the fossils of Protoceratops and Velociraptor which have been recovered there. Specifically, the Udan-Bayr locality, from which the holotype of Udanoceratops was recovered, preserves fossils of Protoceratops and the oviraptorosaur Avimimus.

== Discovery ==
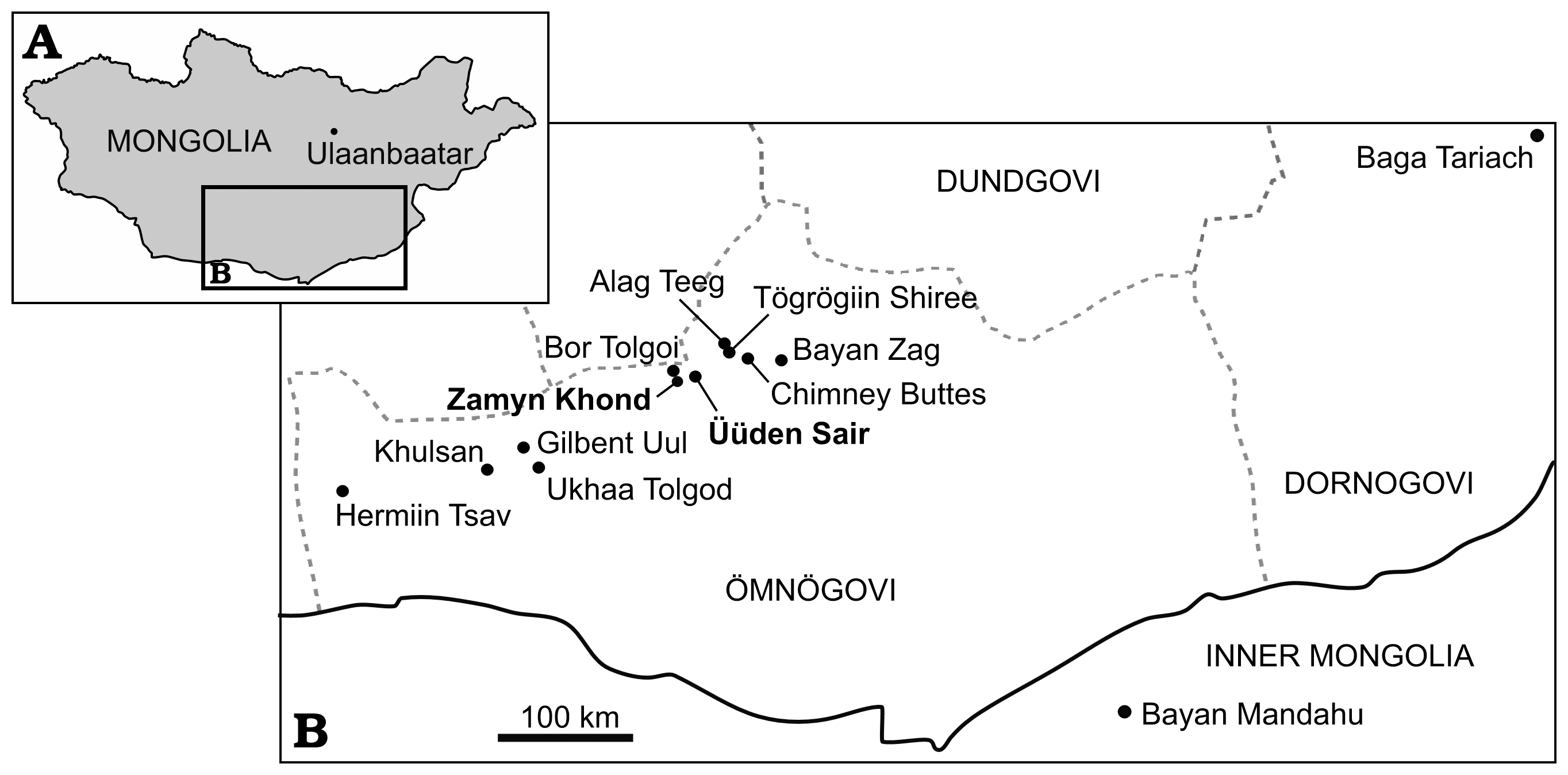
Fossil localities of Mongolia and the location of Bayan Mandahu; Udanoceratops fossils have been reported from the Udan Sayr (center) and possibly Baga Tariach (right) localities

The holotype (PIN 3907/11) of Udanoceratops was collected in the 1980s as part of the Joint Soviet-Mongolian Paleontological Expedition. It was a mature specimen, and has been suggested to have been a male. It was recovered from the Udan-Sayr (also spelled Udyn Sayr or Üüden Sair) locality from a layer of dark grey sandstones designated as Bed 2. The Udan-Sayr locality is part of the Djadochta Formation of Ömnögovi Province, which has been dated to the Campanian stage of the Late Cretaceous period. PIN 3907/11 preserves a near-complete skull, several vertebrae, a scapula, a coracoid, an ilium, and at least some bones from the extremities. All of its bones were encapsulated within calcareous structures, either within concretions or as part of a single, larger mass. The bones were disarticulated and had been scattered, and the skull bones had been separated by taphonomic processes. The specimen was relocated to the Paleontological Institute of the Russian Academy of Sciences and was removed from the matrix through the use of acetic acid. In 1992, it was described by Russian palaeontologist Sergei Kurzanov, and was assigned the binomial name of Udanoceratops tschizhovi. The generic name is derived from the name of the locality in which the holotype was found (Udan-Sayr) and Greek ceras/κέρας meaning "horn" and -ops/ωψ meaning "face"; the species name honours D. O. Tschizhov of the Paleontological Institute, who was credited with the discovery of the specimen.

In 1993 a large skull almost 1 m (3.3 ft) in length was reported from the nearby Bayan Mandahu Formation by Tomasz Jerzykiewicz and colleagues and was assigned to Udanoceratops. However, Polish palaeontologist Łukasz Czepiński in 2020 pointed out that there are no referable specimens to Udanoceratops from the Bayan Mandahu collections, and there are none in the literature which correspond to the reported remains. Therefore, he suspected that Jerzykiewicz and colleagues confused Udanoceratops with the contemporary (and relatively large) Protoceratops hellenikorhinus.

In 2004 Viktor S. Tereschenko referred a juvenile specimen (PIN 4046/11) to Udanoceratops aff. tschizhovi, from the Baga Tariach locality in Dornogovi Province, which Tereschhenko attributed to the Djadochta Formation. Geological analyses carried out across fossil-bearing localities of the Gobi Desert, published by Mahito Watabe and colleagues in 2010, indicates that this locality correlates best with the Maastrichtian-stage Barun Goyot Formation. The status of PIN 4046/11 has varied since then. It has been classified as "Udanoceratops" sp. and ?Udanoceratops sp, and some studies, including one authored by Tereschenko himself, consider it an indeterminate leptoceratopsid.

== Description ==
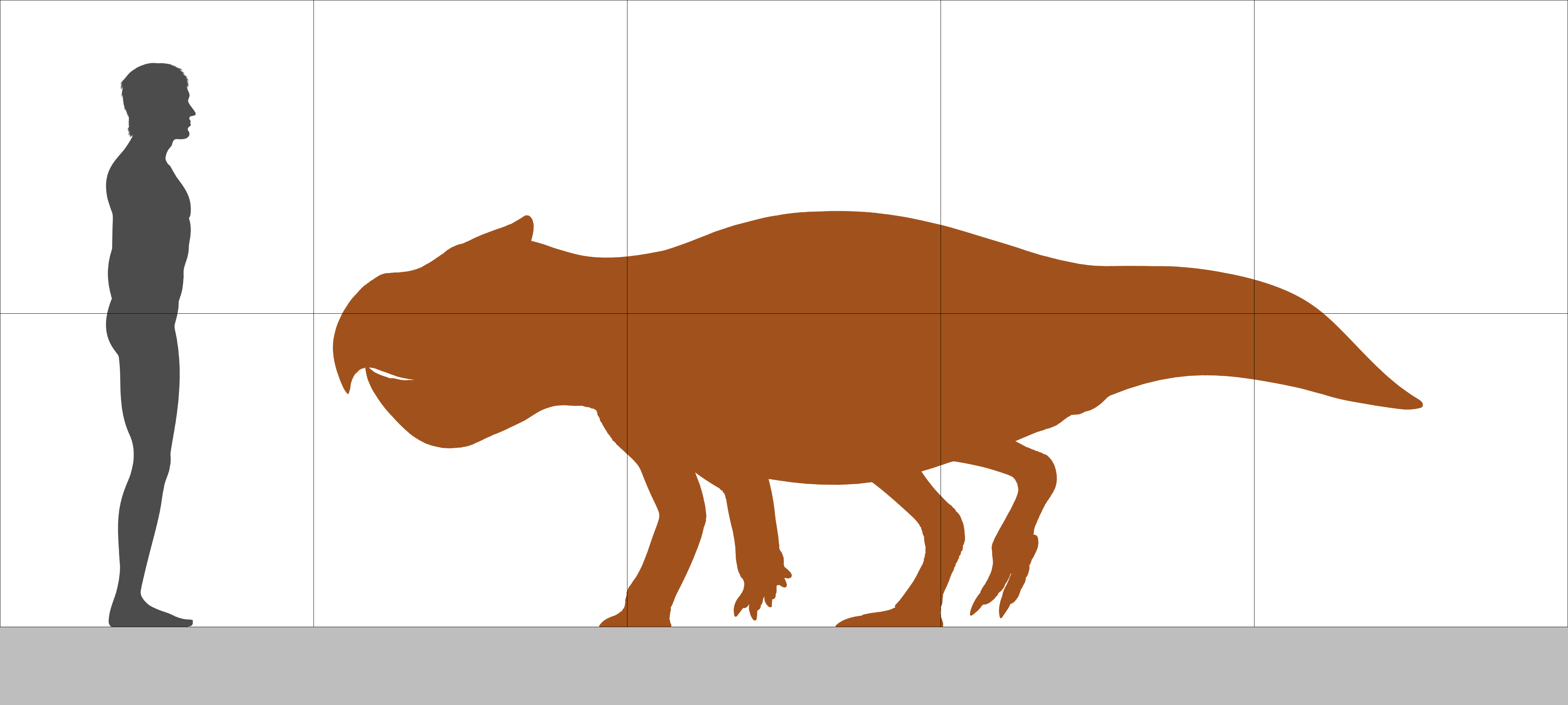
Size comparison to a 1.8 m tall human

Udanoceratops was a large ceratopsian, estimated by V. S. Tereschenko to have reached nearly 4 m (13 ft) in length, and by Gregory S. Paul to have weighed about 700 kg (1,500 lb). It is the largest named leptoceratopsid known so far, though fragmentary remains from Kazakhstan may belong to an animal of similar body size. Writing about the genus in 1992, Kurzanov suggested that it may have been anywhere between two and three times the size of Protoceratops, to which he believed it was closely related.

=== Skull and dentition ===
Reconstruction of the holotype skull

The skull of Udanoceratops is considerably larger, both in general size and in height, than that of other leptoceratopsids and protoceratopsids. Kurzanov noted that its skull, which measured 60–70 cm (24–28 in) in length, was roughly half as long again as that of the North American Montanoceratops, the second-largest leptoceratopsid. Among the ceratopsians discussed by Kurzanov, Udanoceratops was found to be most similar to Leptoceratops, though significant differences between the two were noted. The skull of Udanoceratops was significantly taller, especially around the area of the rostral bone. The rostral itself was very high and narrow, with a process on its posterior (rear) portion which was very long, covering roughly two-thirds of the lower margin of the premaxilla. The premaxillary bones of Udanoceratops were completely toothless, unlike the contemporary Protoceratops. The nasal cavity was larger than in protoceratopsids, and the nasal bones themselves were considerably more robust. Udanoceratops' jugal bones were long and low, and were oriented almost horizontally. While many ceratopsians have an additional bone on each jugal, called the epijugal, this structure was apparently absent in Udanoceratops; the same is seen in some juvenile specimens of Protoceratops. Rather, there was a small, roughly textured projection where it would have otherwise sat. A cornified area would have extended from the jugals to the quadratojugals, supported in part by this projection, which would have been covered in a sheath of keratin. Unlike many other ceratopsians, where either a full horn or a slight tubercule was present on the nasal bones, at least the dorsal (top) portions of Udanoceratops' nasals appear to have sported nothing at all, as the bone texture is completely smooth there. A rough cornified area appears to have run along the anterior portion of the nasal bones, connecting to a similar patch on an ascending branch at the anterior (front) part of the premaxillae. While much of the posterior portion of the skull has not been preserved, the shape of the lower temporal fossa suggests that Udanoceratops may have had a slightly longer frill than that observed in Leptoceratops, though it would have still been small.

Udanoceratops had an extremely deep mandible (lower jaw), considerably more so than that of related taxa. It is very short, although the extent of this is not entirely certain, as the predentary bone (the one supporting the lower beak in ornithischians) is not preserved. Based on the surrounding bone texture, it likely extended almost to the beginning of the tooth row; the gap between the most anterior teeth and the posterior edge of the predentary was only around the diameter of one alveolus (tooth socket). The left dentary of PIN 3907/11, the holotype, bears a prominent vertical break on its anterior third, which may be the result of intraspecies conflict. Kurzanov forwarded the idea that Udanoceratops engaged in ritual confrontations wherein two individuals, presumably males, would inflict blows on one another by swinging their heads sideways and upwards, in a way similar to that suggested for other ceratopsians. Gregory S. Paul, in 2016, instead suggested that the break may have been inflicted by the beak of another individual. Due to the overall size of its skull in relation to other basal ceratopsians, it is likely that Udanoceratops had very large mandibular adductor muscles (those responsible for opening, or adducting, the jaw), though not as large as those of ceratopsids; the muscle attachment sites themselves were likely fairly short, judging by other leptoceratopsids.

The teeth of Udanoceratops differed between upper and lower jaws. The number of teeth on the maxilla has variously been reported as either twelve, or fifteen. These maxillary teeth had oval-shaped crowns, with thickened central crests which had shifted posteriorly in relation to the teeth of related taxa, and roots which were relatively short anteroposteriorly (from front-to-back) and had been compressed laterally (from side-to-side) across their length. The roots of the dentary teeth, of which there were either twelve, or eighteen, were identical to those on the upper jaw, though the structure of their crowns was very different, having an oblique and very strongly developed central crest. Wear patterns indicate that when the jaw was closed, shelves on the labial (outer) side of the dentary teeth would have supported the maxillary teeth. Kurzanov suggested, consequently, that Udanoceratops' teeth could operate "only as cutting mechanisms". Similar tooth wear patterns have been noted in Archaeoceratops, Montanoceratops, and Leptoceratops.

=== Postcranial skeleton ===
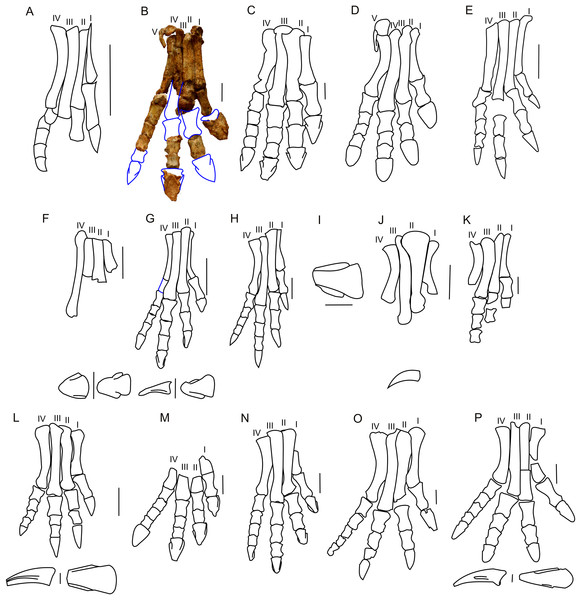
Foot anatomy of non-ceratopsid ceratopsians. The metatarsals and pedal phalanges marked as "M" belong to a specimen (PIN 4046/11) referred to Udanoceratops

The postcranial anatomy of Udanoceratops was not discussed at length in its initial description. Rather, Kurzanov intended to publish a follow-up paper wherein he described it in greater detail. This paper never saw publication. V. S. Tereschenko, in 2008, noted that (assuming PIN 4046/11 belongs to this genus) Udanoceratops had nine cervical (neck) vertebrae; based on other leptoceratopsids and protoceratopsids, it likely had nine thoracic (upper torso), three lumbar (lower torso), eight sacral (within the sacrum), and somewhere between 38–50 caudal (tail) vertebrae. The thorax specifically would have been fairly immobile, with mobility restricted to the area between the sixth and eighth thoracic vertebrae, unlike in related taxa; that said, the torso overall appears to have been more mobile vertically than in Protoceratops. The neural spines of the caudal vertebrae were proportionally longer than those of Protoceratops, and the tail overall appears to have been laterally flattened. The anterior vertebrae, those towards the front, were strongly heterocoelous (bearing saddle-shaped articular surfaces which allowed for a high range of motion) in the adult specimen, though less so in PIN 4046/11.

Some appendicular characteristics of Udanoceratops' appendicular skeleton noted by Kurzanov are the presence of very large and sharp pubic and ischial processes on the ilium, a short and wide scapula, a coracoid with a strongly developed caudal process, and very robust bones of the extremities. A subsequent paper briefly noted that the radius, one of the bones of the forearm, had a broad, flat head. Ungual bones assigned to Udanoceratops, assuming that PIN 4046/11 does belong to this taxon, resemble those of Protoceratops, being flat and wide. In 2004, Brenda Chinnery suggested that Udanoceratops may have been capable of bipedal locomotion based on perceived similarities with Psittacosaurus. However, V. S. Tereschenko noted that this is very unlikely, and that Chinnery had assumed "without sufficient foundation" that Udanoceratops had proportionally short forelimbs. Tereschenko suggested that Udanoceratops may have been capable of running quadrupedally, though due to its size, it would have been considerably slower than relatives such as Leptoceratops.

== Classification ==
Udanoceratops belonged to the clade Ceratopsia (ancient Greek for 'horned faces'), a group of herbivorous dinosaurs with parrot-like beaks which thrived in North America and Asia during the Cretaceous Period. In his 1992 paper describing Udanoceratops, Sergei Kurzanov suggested that it was the most basal member of the family Protoceratopsidae, in which he also included Leptoceratops. He did note strong similarities between the two genera, though simultaneously drew comparisons with more basal taxa, such as Psittacosaurus, and with ceratopsids. Subsequent analyses have placed Udanoceratops within the family Leptoceratopsidae, although specific placements vary between studies. Yiming He and colleagues in 2015, for instance, recovered Udanoceratops in a very derived position within leptoceratopsids, as the sister taxon of a clade otherwise consisting of Zhuchenceratops, Gryphoceratops, and Unescoceratops, in that order; In 2019, Morschhauser and colleagues recovered Udanoceratops as part of a clade with Ischioceratops, Prenoceratops, and Zhuchengceratops.

The cladogram below reflects the results of the phylogenetic analysis of basal ceratopsians by Yiming He and colleagues (2015):

- Ceratopsia
  - Yinlong
  - - - Chaoyangsaurus
      - Xuanhuaceratops
    - - Psittacosaurus spp.
      - Neoceratopsia
        - Liaoceratops
        - - Aquilops
          - - Yamaceratops
            - - Auroraceratops
              - - - Archaeoceratops
                  - Helioceratops
                - - Koreaceratops
                  - - Leptoceratopsidae
                      - Asiaceratops
                      - - Cerasinops
                        - - - Ischioceratops
                            - Montanoceratops
                          - - Prenoceratops
                            - - Leptoceratops
                              - - Udanoceratops
                                - - Zhuchengceratops
                                  - - Gryphoceratops
                                    - Unescoceratops
                    - - Coronosauria

The cladogram below depicts the interrelationships of Leptoceratopsidae, as recovered by Morschhauser and colleagues in 2019:

- Leptoceratopsidae
  - Helioceratops brachygnathus
  - - Leptoceratops gracilis
    - - - Ischioceratops zhuchengensis
        - - Prenoceratops pieganensis
          - - Udanoceratops tchizhovi
            - Zhuchengceratops inexpectus
      - - Koreaceratops hwaseongensis
        - - Montanoceratops cerorhynchus
          - - Cerasinops hodgskissi
            - - Gryphoceratops morrisoni
              - Unescoceratops kopelhusae

== Palaeobiology ==
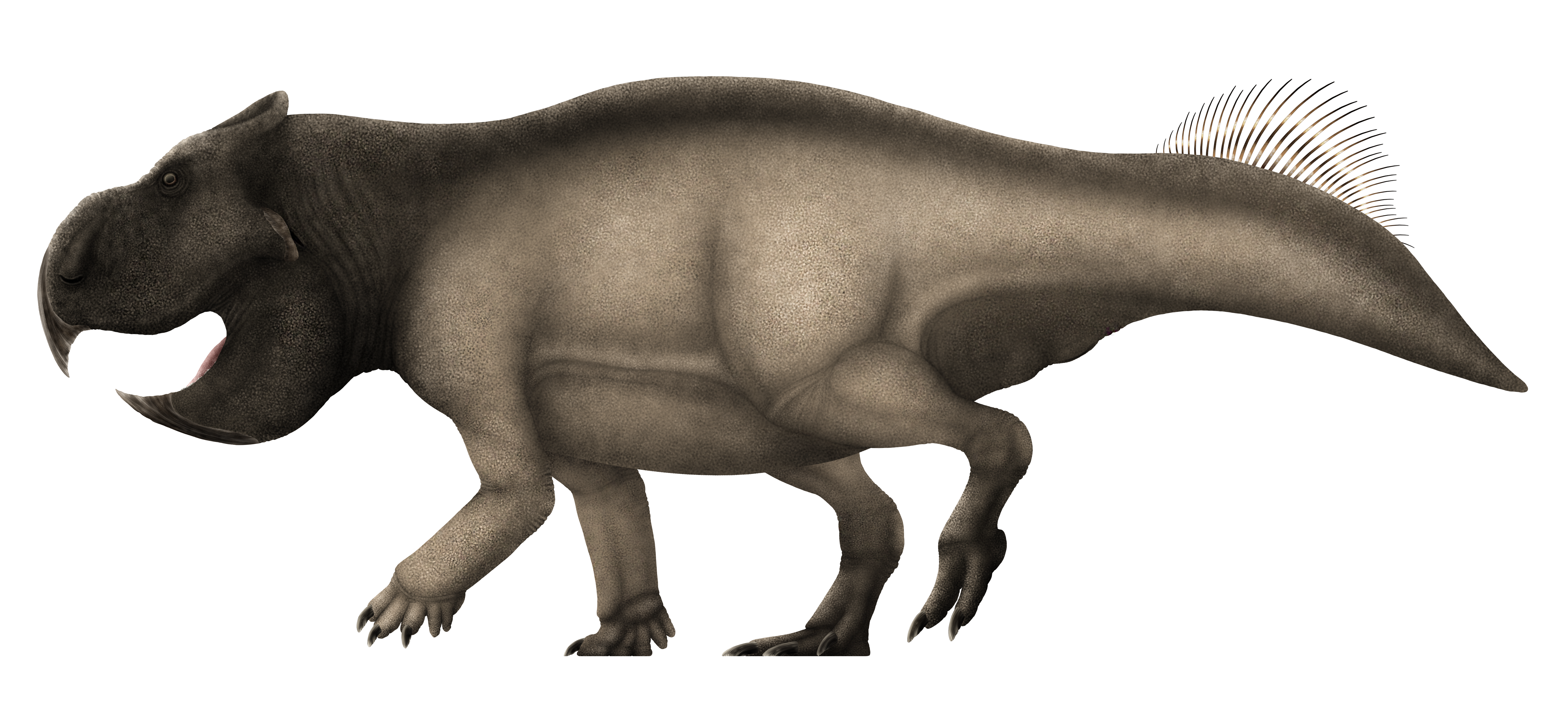
Life restoration

Udanoceratops, like all ceratopsians, was a herbivore. The short, deep jaws would have given the animal a powerful bite. The toothless beak would have served to grasp and crop stems or leaves, and as in other leptoceratopsids, the teeth would have met with an action that combined shearing and crushing. The feeding adaptations seen in leptoceratopsids suggest a diet of relatively tough food items, however though little is known about the plants that grew in the Gobi Desert during the Cretaceous. The type specimen does bear an injury to its face, possibly caused by the biting of another Udanoceratops. This might also explain its strong bite force as having some sort of social or defensive function. In 2008, Tereschenko suggested that Udanoceratops was somewhat aquatic in its habits, based on its high neural spines, the lateral compression of its tail, and the shape of its ungual (which he suggested also implied semiaquatic tendencies in Protoceratops); he argued the same in a paper published in 2013 co-authored with T. Singer. In a subsequent paper, however, he rejected this hypothesis, suggesting that the ungual shape of the genus instead correlated more to supporting the animal's weight on loose substrate without sinking.

== Palaeoenvironment ==
Udanoceratops is known from the Djadochta Formation in Mongolia, which dates back to the Late Cretaceous about 71 million to 75 million years ago, being deposited during a rapid sequence of polarity changes in the late part of the Campanian stage. Dominant sediments at Djadochta include dominant reddish-orange and pale orange to light gray, medium to fine-grained sands and sandstones, caliche, and sparse fluvial (river-deposited) processes. Based on these components, the paleoenvironments of the Djadochta Formation are interpreted as having a hot, semiarid climate with large dune fields/sand dunes and several short-lived water bodies, similar to the modern Gobi Desert. It is estimated that at the end of the Campanian age and into the Maastrichtian the climate would shift to the more mesic (humid/wet) conditions seen in the Nemegt Formation.

The Djadochta Formation is separated into a lower Bayn Dzak Member and upper Turgrugyin Member; in both of these members, the related Protoceratops is a dominant part of the fauna The Bayn Dzak member (mostly the Bayn Dzak locality) has yielded the dromaeosaurids Halszkaraptor and Velociraptor mongoliensis; oviraptorid Oviraptor; ankylosaurid Pinacosaurus grangeri; Protoceratops; and troodontid Saurornithoides. Ukhaa Tolgod, a highly fossiliferous locality is also included in the Bayn Dzak member. and its dinosaur paleofauna is composed of alvarezsaurids Kol and Shuvuuia; ankylosaurid Minotaurasaurus; birds Apsaravis and Gobipteryx; dromaeosaurid Tsaagan; oviraptorids Citipati and Khaan; troodontids Almas and Byronosaurus; and a new, unnamed protoceratopsid closely related to Protoceratops. In the Turgrugyin Member (mainly Tugriken Shireh locality), the bird Elsornis; dromaeosaurids Mahakala and Velociraptor mongoliensis; and ornithomimid Aepyornithomimus are known. The Udan Sayr site, from which Udanoceratops' holotype was recovered, has also born fossils of Avimimus and Protoceratops.

== See also ==
- Timeline of ceratopsian research
