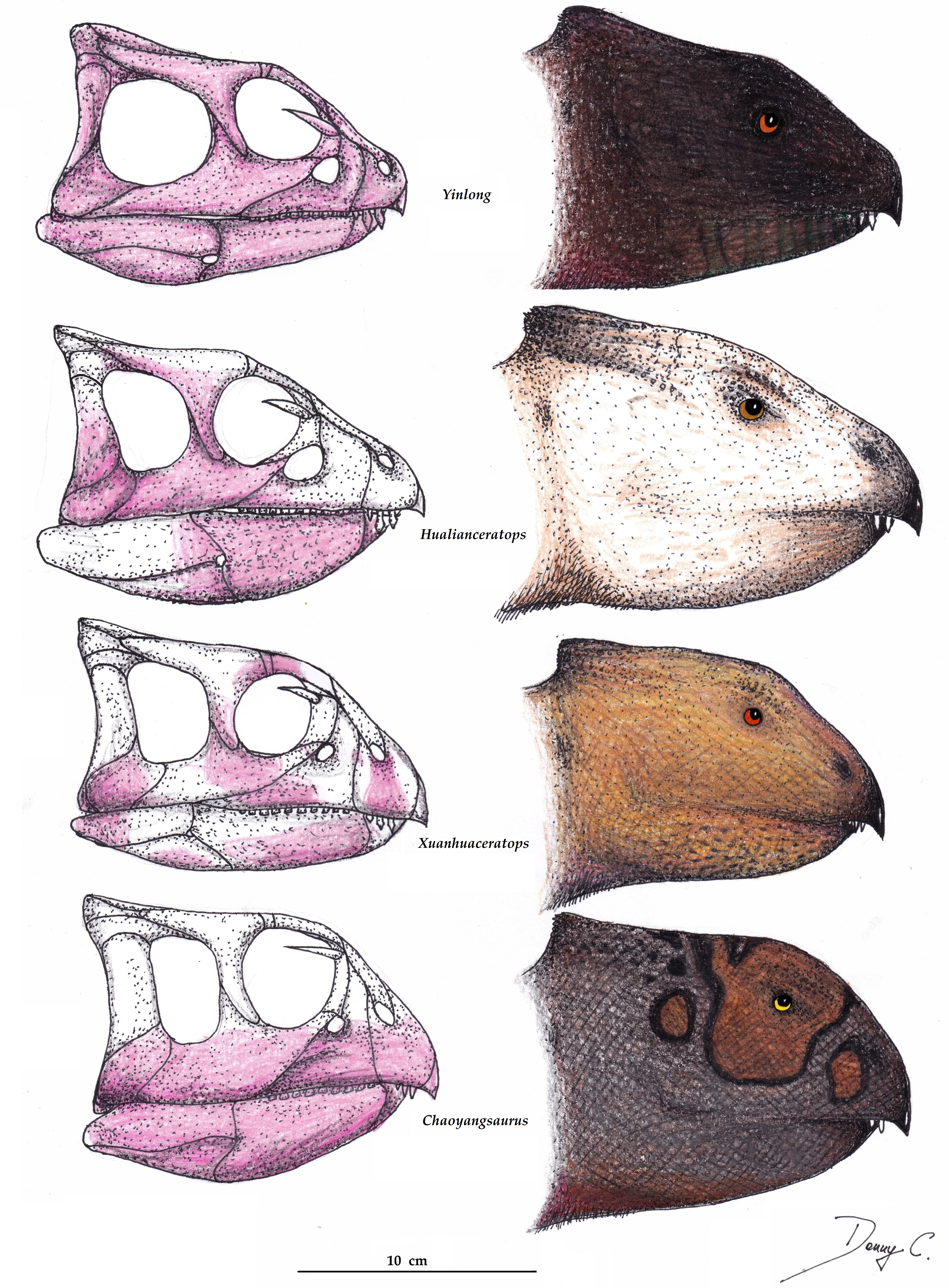
- Compared close-up of the four so far known chaoyangsaurid genera, with pink representing known parts of skulls

Scientific classification
- Kingdom: Animalia
- Phylum: Chordata
- Class: Reptilia
- Clade: Dinosauria
- Clade: †Ornithischia
- Clade: †Ceratopsia
- Family: †Chaoyangsauridae; Zhao, Cheng, & Xu, 1999

Type species
- †Chaoyangsaurus youngi Zhao, Cheng, & Xu, 1999

Genera
- †Chaoyangsaurus; †Hualianceratops; †Stenopelix?; †Xuanhuaceratops; †Yinlong

= Chaoyangsauridae =

Chaoyangsauridae Temporal range: Late Jurassic, 160–148 Ma

Family of ceratopsian dinosaurs

Chaoyangsauridae is a family of ceratopsian dinosaurs. They are among the earliest known marginocephalian dinosaurs, with remains dating to about 160 million years ago, during the Late Jurassic period. Members of this group had sharp beaks for snipping off leaves to eat, and a very small frill.

This family is officially defined in the PhyloCode as "the largest clade containing Chaoyangosaurus youngi, but not Psittacosaurus mongoliensis and Triceratops horridus".

Four dinosaur genera, Chaoyangsaurus, Xuanhuaceratops, Yinlong and Hualianceratops, are usually considered to belong to the Chaoyangsauridae. In 2020, Yu et al. classified Stenopelix as a chaoyangsaurid.

== See also ==
- Timeline of ceratopsian research
