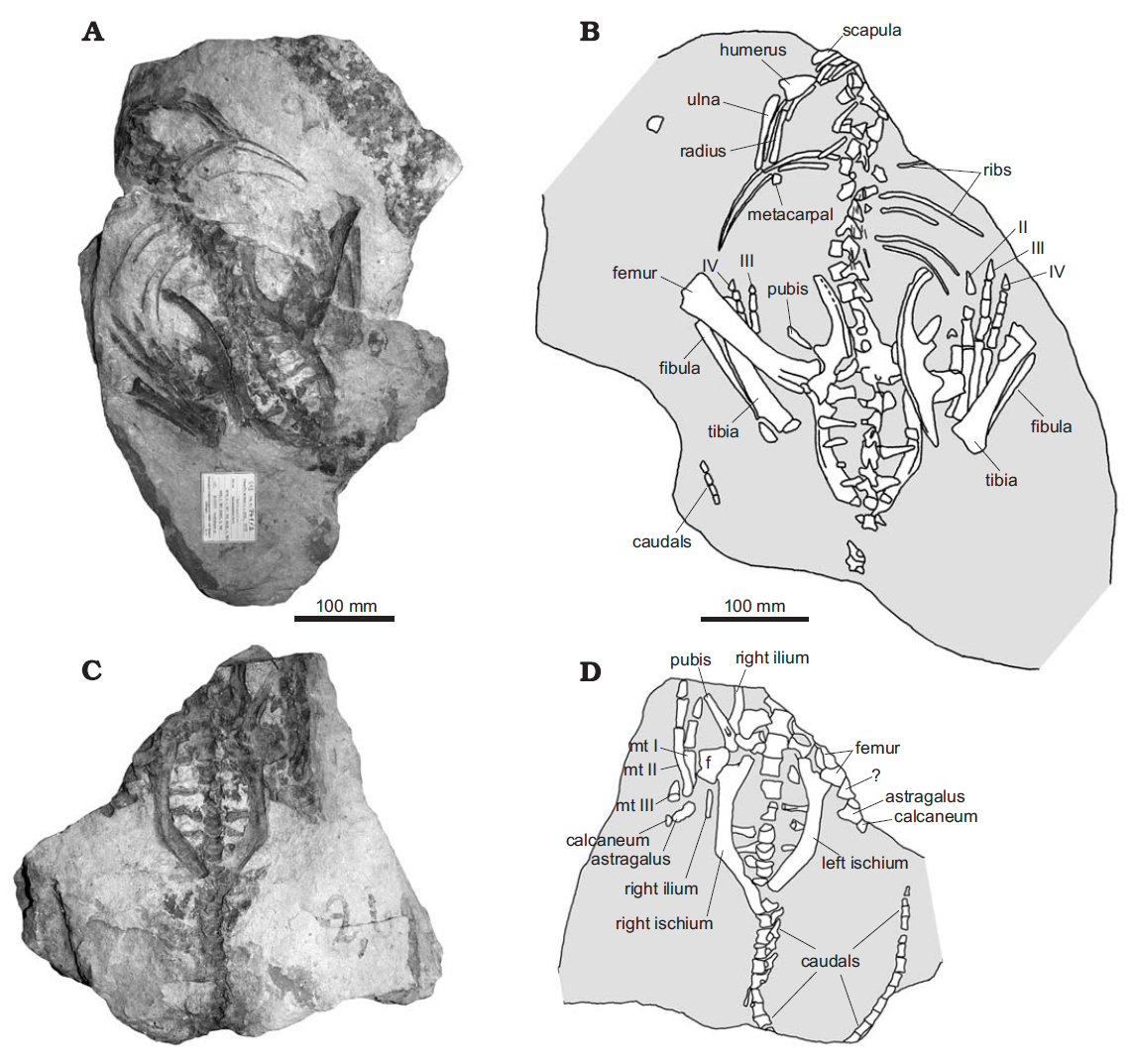
- Latex casts of the holotype slabs and interpretive drawings

Scientific classification
- Kingdom: Animalia
- Phylum: Chordata
- Class: Reptilia
- Clade: Dinosauria
- Clade: †Ornithischia
- Clade: †Ceratopsia
- Family: †Chaoyangsauridae
- Genus: †Stenopelix; Meyer, 1857
- Species: †S. valdensis

Binomial name
- †Stenopelix valdensis Meyer, 1857

= Stenopelix =

Stenopelix Temporal range: Late Berriasian, ~140 Ma

Extinct genus of dinosaurs

Stenopelix (meaning "narrow pelvis") is a genus of basal ceratopsian from the Early Cretaceous (late Berriasian stage, approximately 140 million years ago) of Germany. The genus is based on a partial skeleton lacking the skull, and its classification is based on characteristics of the hips.

== Discovery and species ==
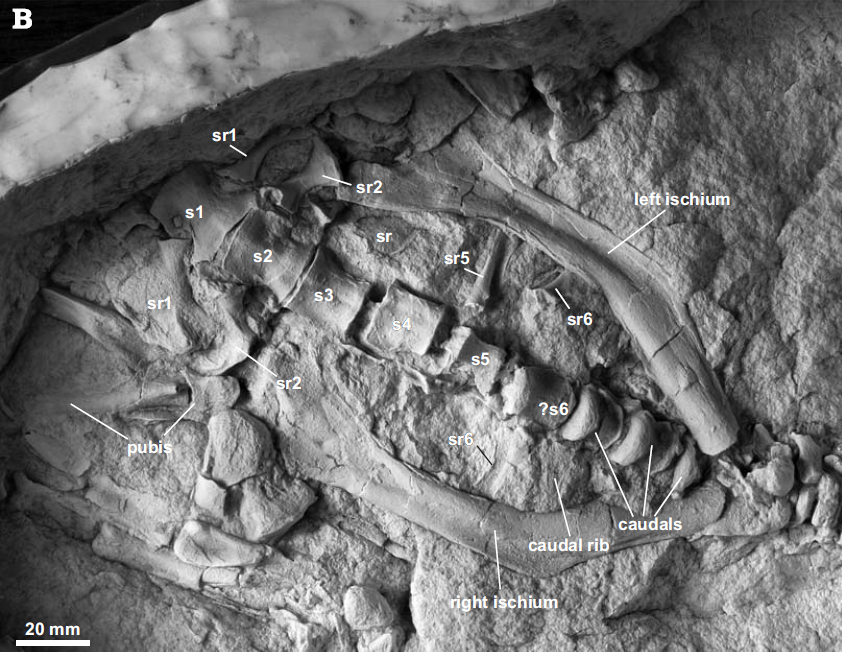
Cast of the pelvic region

In 1855, in a sandstone quarry near Bückeburg on the Harrl, a fossil was found of a small dinosaur. Most of its bones were in a poor condition and removed on preparation, leaving two sets of hollow impressions on the plate and counterplate. The two plates do not overlap completely. The hollows, serving as a natural mold, have since been used to produce several casts in gypsum and latex to facilitate the study of the specimen. It was originally part of the collection of Max Ballerstedt preserved in the Bückeburg Gymnasium Adolfinum but was in 1976 moved to the Georg-August-Universität Göttingen where it now resides in the collection of the Geowissenschaftliches Zentrum der Universität Göttingen.

In 1857, based on this fossil, Christian Erich Hermann von Meyer named the type species Stenopelix valdensis. The generic name is derived from Greek stenos, "narrow", and pelyx, "pelvis". The specific name refers to the Wealden Formation. The holotype, GZG 741/2 (earlier GPI 741–1, 2), found in the Obernkirchen Sandstein Formation, consists of the impressions of an almost complete skeleton, lacking the skull and the neck.

== Description ==
Stenopelix was a small herbivorous animal, reaching 1.4 m (4.6 ft) in length and 10 kg (22 lb) in body mass. The preserved rump and tail have a combined length of just 97 centimetres; the femur is fourteen centimetres long. The species can be distinguished by several details of the pelvis. The shaft part of the ilium uniformly tapers ending in a rounded point. The shaft of the ischium is thickest in the middle and there shows a distinctive kink.

== Classification ==
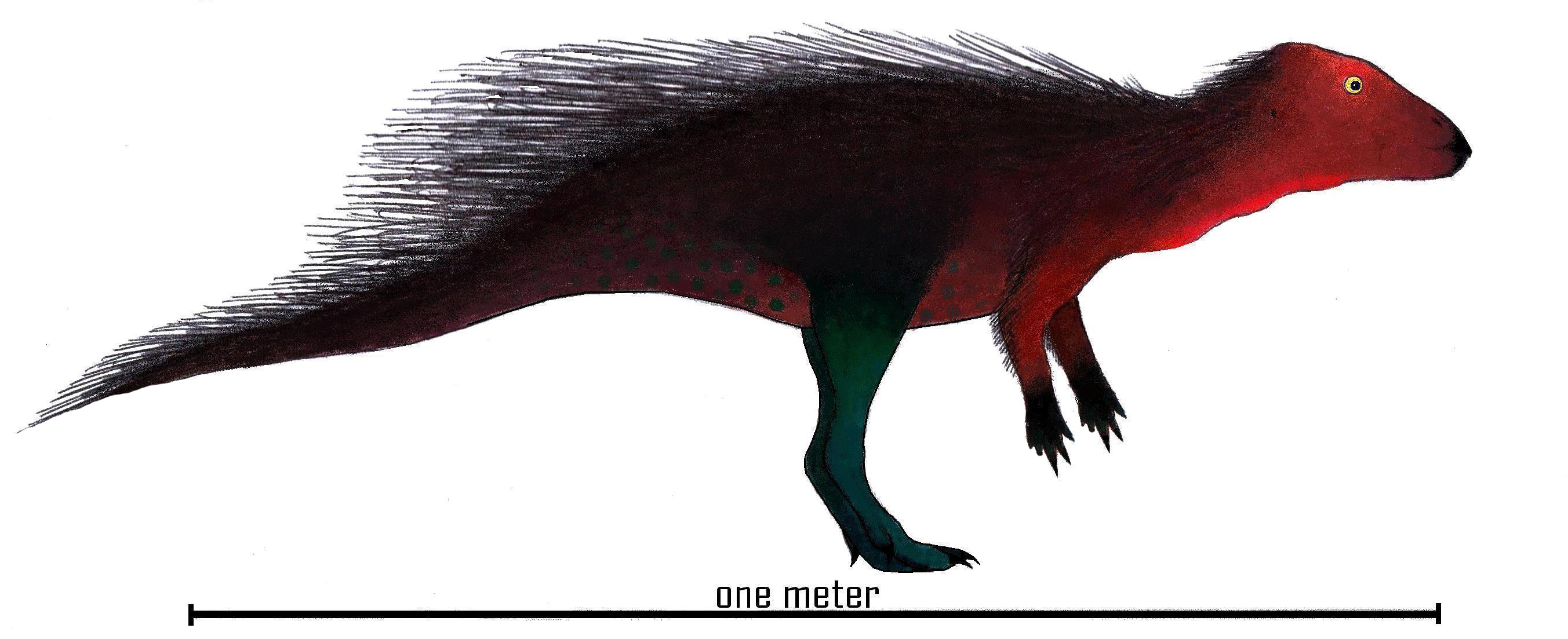
Hypothetical restoration

The classification of Stenopelix is controversial and has ever been problematic because of the lacking skull. Prior to the 1960s, it was often assigned to some ornithopod group. In 1974 Teresa Maryańska suggested it to be a pachycephalosaur, one of the oldest known, due to the apparent exclusion of the pubis from the acetabulum, and the presence of strong caudal ribs. Hans-Dieter Sues and Peter Galton in 1982 showed that the "pubis" was actually part of the acetabulum, and the so-called "caudal ribs" were sacral ribs. The curvature of the ischium and absence of an obturator foramen were not characteristics seen in other pachycephalosaurs. Sues and Galton concluded Stenopelix to be ceratopian.

However, cladistic analyses by Paul Sereno have resulted in a position in the Pachycephalosauria. But paleontologists Richard J. Butler and Robert M. Sullivan nonetheless view the species as being Marginocephalia incertae sedis, rejecting the presumed synapomorphies with the Pachycephalosauria as incorrect identifications or lacking cogency because of a possible presence in ceratopsian groups. A cladistic analysis performed by Butler et al. (2011) showed that Stenopelix is a basal member of the Ceratopsia, and its sister taxon is Yinlong. Morschhauser et al. (2019) recovered Stenopelix within Neoceratopsia. Yu et al. (2020) classified Stenopelix as a chaoyangsaurid with Yinlong, Chaoyangsaurus, Xuanhuaceratops, Hualianceratops. Fonseca et al. (2024) also recovered this genus as a chaoyangsaurid close to Yinlong.

== See also ==
- Timeline of ceratopsian research
