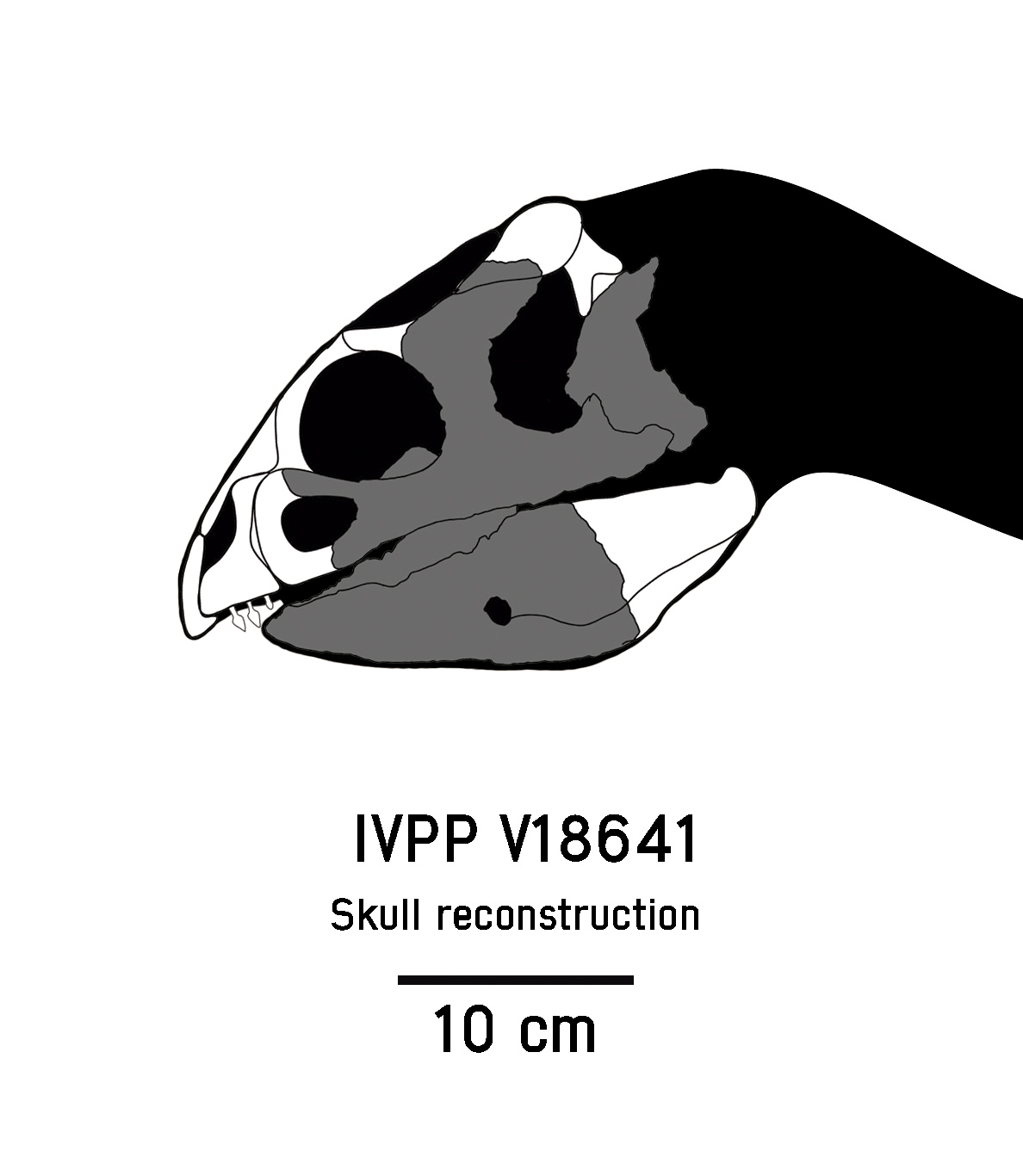
- Skull reconstruction with the preserved parts in grey

Scientific classification
- Kingdom: Animalia
- Phylum: Chordata
- Class: Reptilia
- Clade: Dinosauria
- Clade: †Ornithischia
- Clade: †Ceratopsia
- Family: †Chaoyangsauridae
- Genus: †Hualianceratops; Han et al., 2015
- Species: †H. wucaiwanensis

Binomial name
- †Hualianceratops wucaiwanensis Han et al., 2015

= Hualianceratops =

Hualianceratops Temporal range: Late Jurassic, 160 Ma

Extinct genus of dinosaurs

Hualianceratops is a genus of herbivorous ceratopsian dinosaur that lived about 160 million years ago in the Late Jurassic epoch in what is now western China. The single species, H. wucaiwanensis was described in 2015. Its size has been compared to that of a spaniel.

== Discovery ==
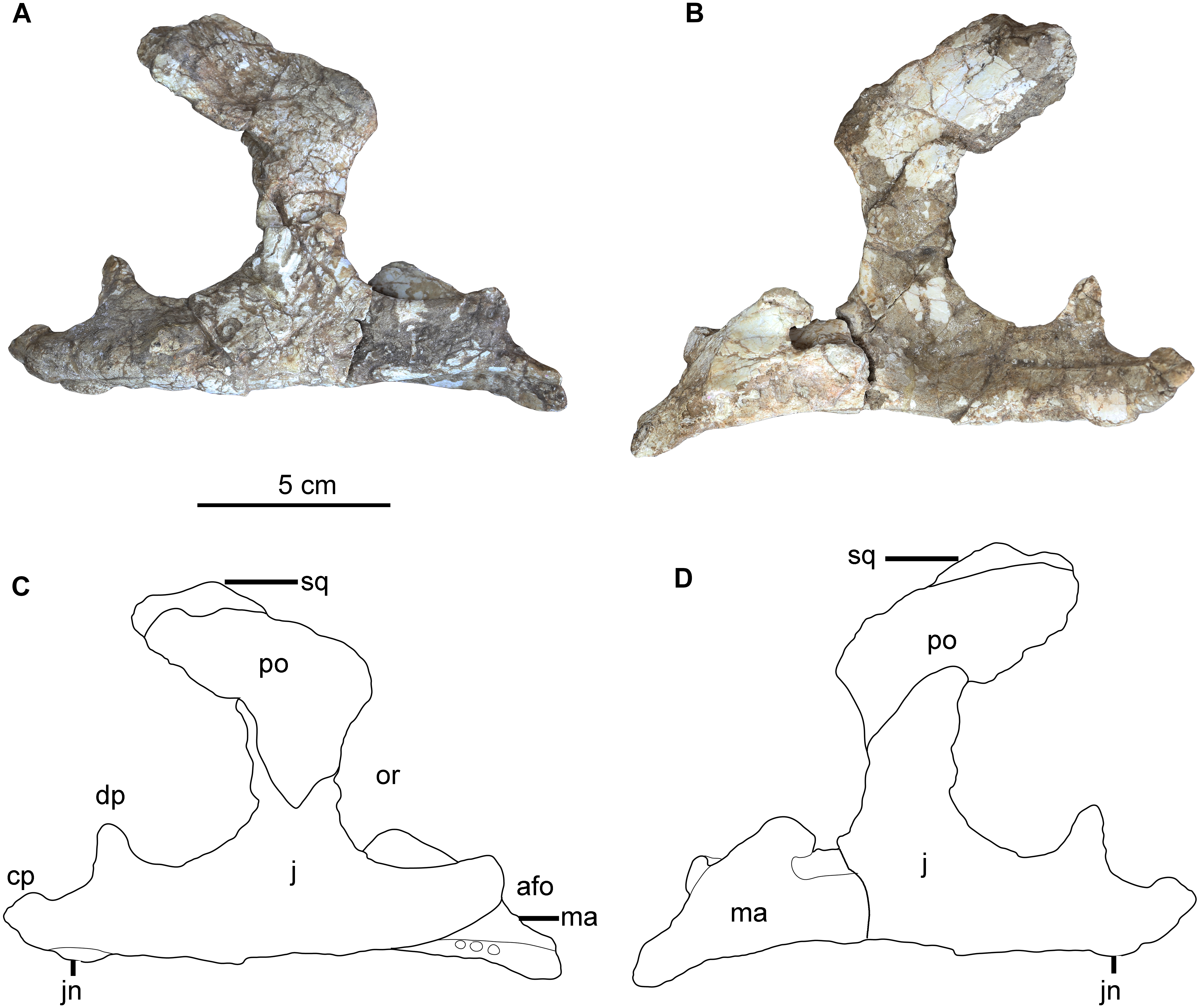
Maxilla and jugal bone

In 2002, an expedition by the Institute of Vertebrate Paleontology and Paleoanthropology and the George Washington University in the region of Wucaiwan in Xinjiang discovered the skeleton of a small dinosaur. The fossil was prepared by Xiang Lishi, Yu Tao and Ding Xiaoqing.

In 2015, the type species Hualianceratops wucaiwanensis was named and described by Han Fenglu, Catherine A. Forster, James M. Clark, and Xu Xing. The generic name combines the Chinese hua, "ornamental", and lian, "face", a reference to the ornamentation of the jaw bones, with ceratops, Latinised Greek for "hornface", a usual suffix in the names of ceratopsians. The specific name refers to the provenance at Wucaiwan, the "five colour bay". The species was named in the electronic publication PLoS ONE and the therefore mandatory Life Science Identifiers are D96319BA-6380-47D6-9512-5BDA15221A00 for the genus and DEEB3095-CB69-47CD-91FC-2D01D9F429D5 for the species. Hualianceratops was one of eighteen dinosaur taxa from 2015 to be described in open access or free-to-read journals.

The holotype, IVPP V18641, was found in a layer of the upper Shishugou Formation dating from the Oxfordian. It consists of a partial skeleton with skull and lower jaws. It mainly preserves the rear sides of the head, some sacral vertebrae, the right lower hindlimb, a left calf bone and parts of the left foot.

== Description ==
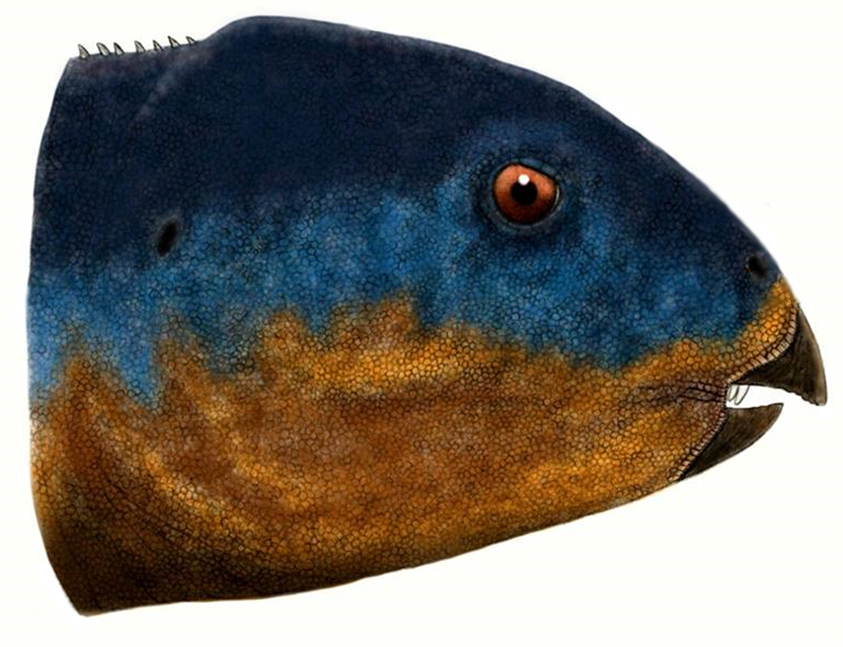
Life restoration (Levi & Daniel Izaguirre, 2017)

Hulianceratops is a small genus, about 1.2 metres (3.9 ft) long. The skull length was estimated at 25 centimetres (9.8 in).

In 2015, several distinguishing traits were established. Five of these were autapomorphies, unique derived qualities. The rear branch of the jugal bone, running below the opening of the infratemporal fenestra, bears a distinctive process obliquely pointing to above and behind. The quadrate bone is robust with an expanded facet contacting the quadratojugal bone. Above the facet with the quadratojugal, the front edge of the quadrate is transversely expanded. Near the lower edge of the quadrate a distinctive notch is present. The dentary bone of the lower jaw is deep and short.

Postcranial bones

Additionally, a unique combination of traits was indicated, that in themselves are not unique. The outer surface of the dentary shows a strongly roughened ornamentation, unlike Chaoyangsaurus and Yinlong but similar to Xuanhuaceratops. The jugal branch below the infratemporal fenestra is transversely expanded, different from Yinlong, but similar to Chaoyangsaurus. The underside of the quadratojugal has grooves contacting the rear branch of the jugal, different from Xuanhuaceratops but similar to Chaoyangsaurus and Yinlong.

The maxilla bears at least nine teeth, the dentary at least seven.

== Phylogeny ==
In 2015, Hualianceratops was placed in the Chaoyangsauridae. The relationships with other members of its clade could not be resolved.

== See also ==
- Timeline of ceratopsian research
