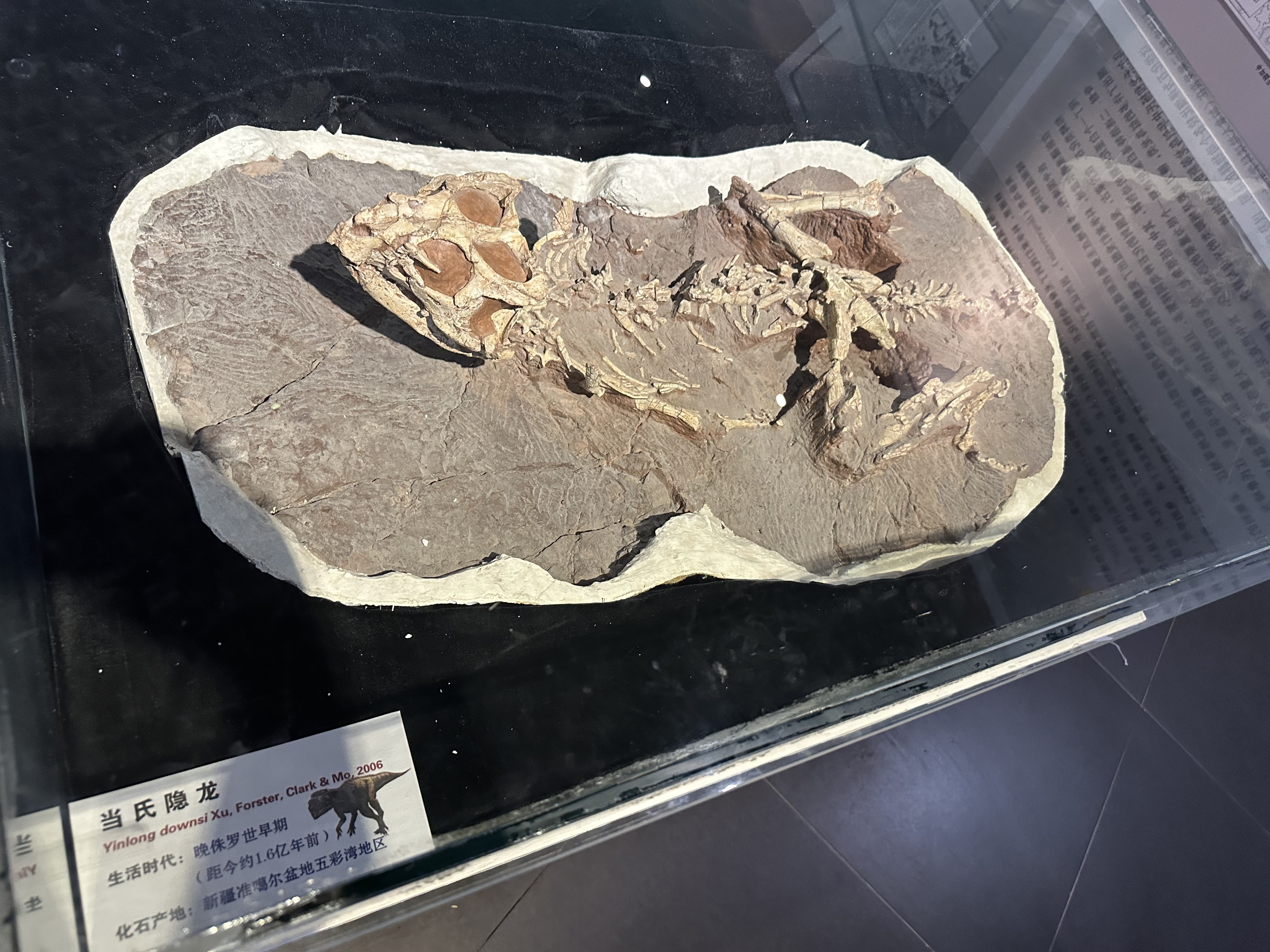
- Fossil skeleton

Scientific classification
- Kingdom: Animalia
- Phylum: Chordata
- Class: Reptilia
- Clade: Dinosauria
- Clade: †Ornithischia
- Clade: †Ceratopsia
- Family: †Chaoyangsauridae
- Genus: †Yinlong; Xu et al., 2006
- Species: †Y. downsi

Binomial name
- †Yinlong downsi Xu et al., 2006

= Yinlong =

Yinlong Temporal range: Late Jurassic, 158 Ma

Extinct genus of dinosaurs

Yinlong (simplified Chinese: 隐龙; traditional Chinese: 隱龍; pinyin: yǐn lóng, meaning "hidden dragon") is a genus of basal ceratopsian dinosaur from the Late Jurassic Period of China. By far the earliest known ceratopsian, it was a small, primarily bipedal herbivore.

== Discovery and species ==
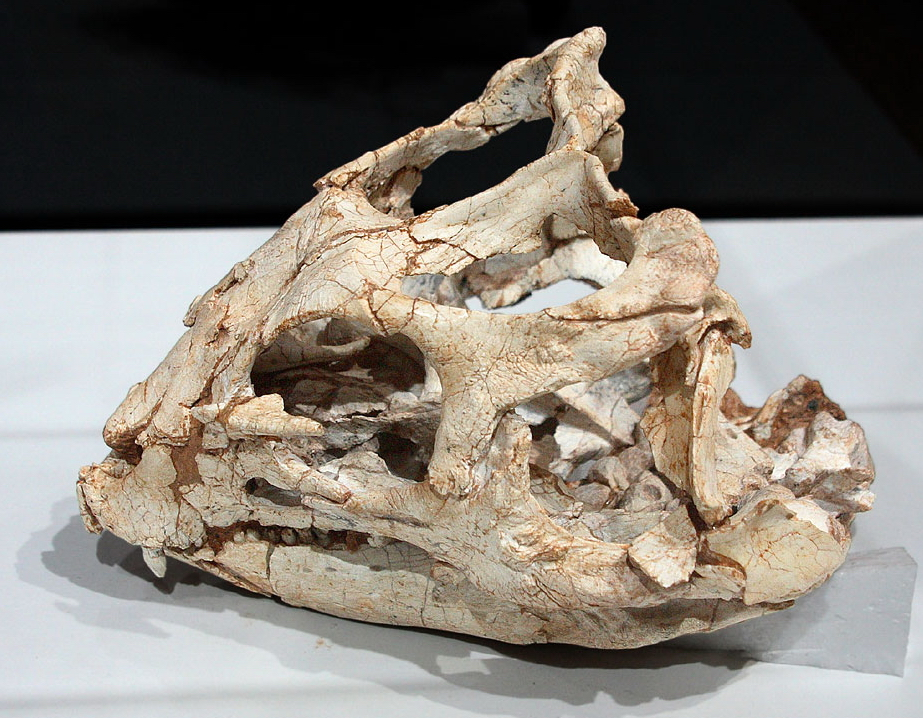
Fossil skull

A coalition of American and Chinese paleontologists, including Xu Xing, Catherine Forster, Jim Clark, and Mo Jinyou, described and named Yinlong in 2006. The generic name is derived from the Mandarin Chinese words 隱 (yǐn: "hidden") and 龍 (lóng: "dragon"), a reference to the movie Crouching Tiger, Hidden Dragon, large portions of which were filmed in the western Chinese province of Xinjiang, near the locality where this animal's fossil remains were discovered. Long is the word most often used in the Chinese media when referring to dinosaurs. The species was named after the American vertebrate paleontologist William Randall Downs III, a frequent participant in paleontological expeditions to China who died the year before Yinlong was discovered.

The known fossil material of Yinlong consists of many skeletons and skulls. The first specimen discovered was a single exceptionally well-preserved skeleton, complete with skull, of a nearly adult animal, found in 2004 in the Middle-Late Jurassic strata of the Shishugou Formation located in Xinjiang Province, China. Yinlong was discovered in an upper section of this formation which dates to the Oxfordian stage of the Late Jurassic, or 161.2 to 155.7 million years ago. Most other described ceratopsians are known from the later Cretaceous Period.

== Description ==
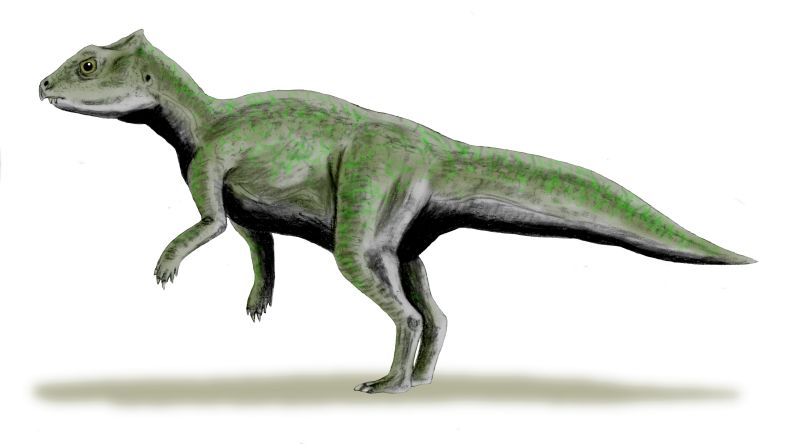
Life reconstruction

Yinlong was a relatively small dinosaur, reaching 1.2 m (3.9 ft) in length and 10 kg (22 lb) in body mass. Despite a virtually frill-less and totally hornless skull, Yinlong is a ceratopsian. Its skull is deep and wide and relatively large compared to most ornithischians, but also proportionately smaller than most other ceratopsians. Long robust hindlimbs and shorter slender forelimbs with three-fingered hands suggests a bipedal lifestyle like many small ornithopods.

== Classification ==
A small rostral bone on the end of the upper jaw clearly identifies Yinlong as a ceratopsian, although the skull displays several features, especially the ornamentation of the squamosal bone of the skull roof, which were previously thought to be unique to pachycephalosaurians. The presence of these features in Yinlong indicates these as actual synapomorphies (unique features) of the larger group Marginocephalia, which contains both the pachycephalosaurs and the ceratopsians, although these features have been lost in all known ceratopsians more derived than Yinlong. The addition of these characters further strengthens the support for Marginocephalia. Yinlong also preserves skull features reminiscent of the family Heterodontosauridae, providing support for the hypothesis that heterodontosaurids are closely related to marginocephalians The group containing Marginocephalia and Heterodontosauridae has been named Heterodontosauriformes. However, this hypothesis was not supported by a subsequent analysis of basal ornithischians that was carried out as part of a study on the postcranial anatomy of Yinlong, which resolved the below phylogeny of Ceratopsia.

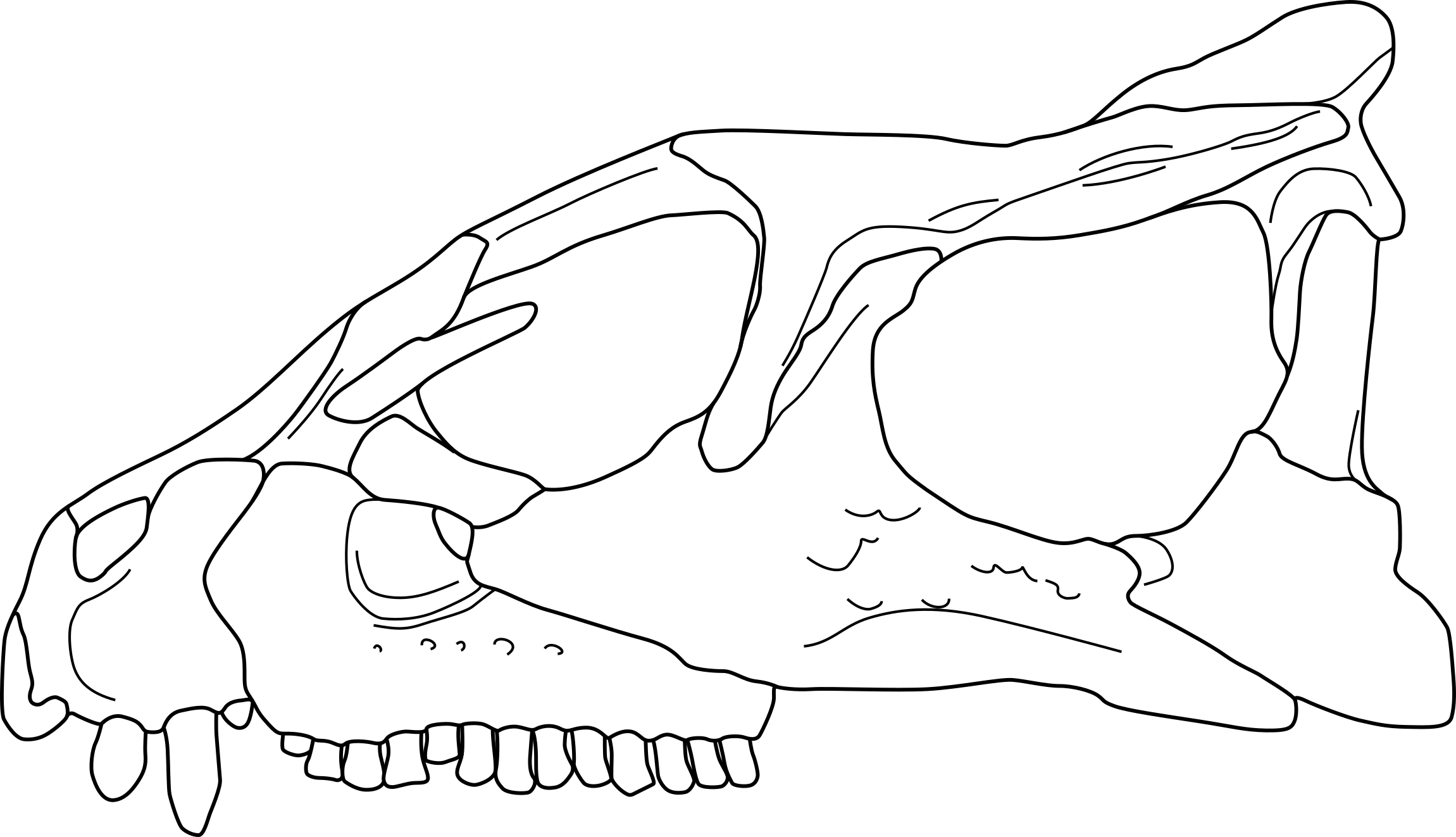
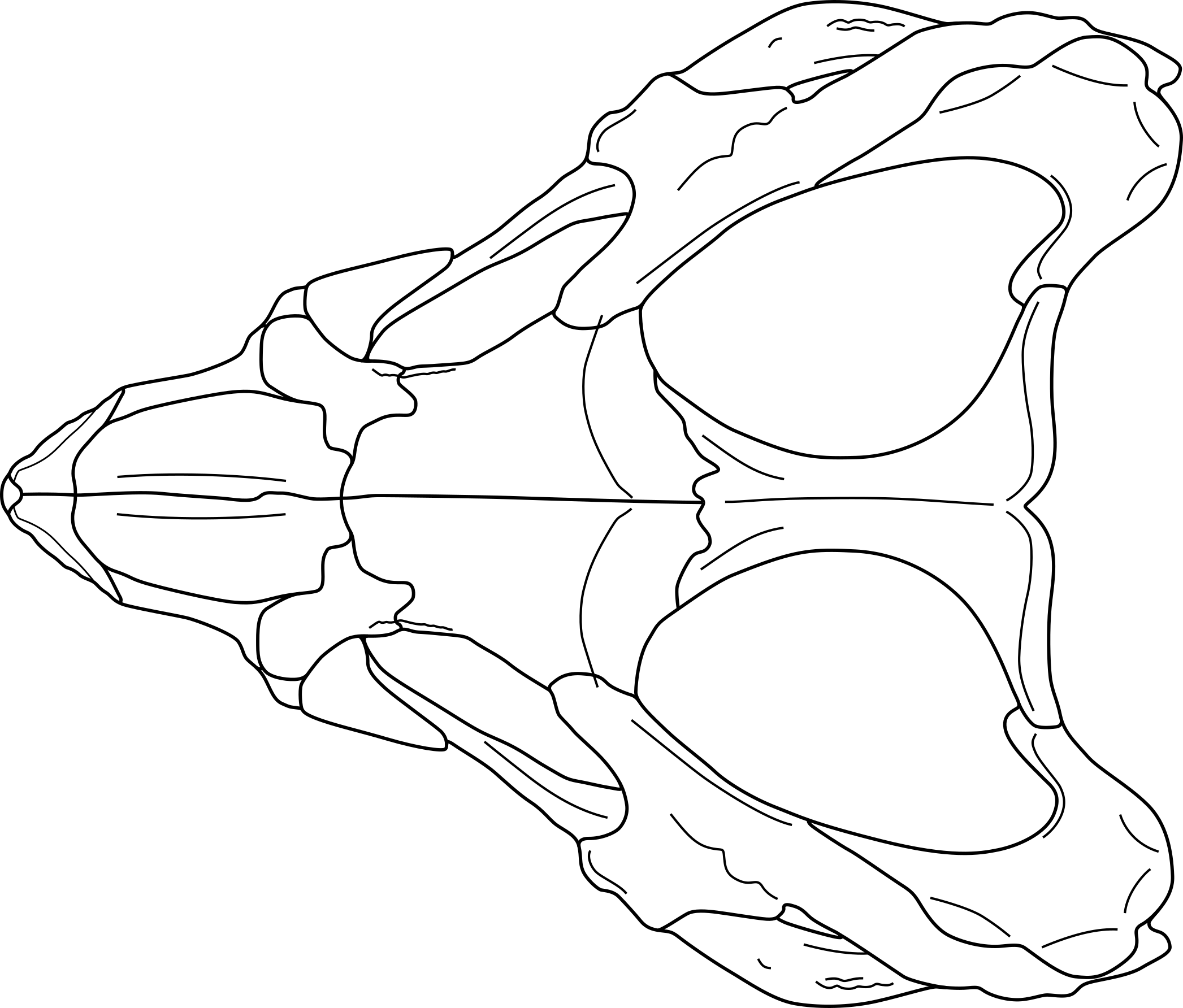
Side and top views of the reconstructed skull of Yinlong

- Ceratopsia
  - Albalophosaurus
  - - Psittacosaurus lujiatunensis
    - Psittacosaurus mongoliensis
  - Chaoyangsauridae
    - - Stenopelix valdensis
      - Yinlong downsi
    - - Chaoyangsaurus youngi
      - - Xuanhuaceratops niei
        - Hualianceratops wucaiwanensis
  - Neoceratopsia
    - Liaoceratops yanzigouensis
    - - Archaeoceratops oshimai
      - - Koreaceratops hwaseongensis
        - Yamaceratops dorngobiensis
        - Aquilops americanus
        - - Auroraceratops rugosus
          - - Mosaiceratops azumai
            - - Leptoceratops gracilis
              - - Bagaceratops rozhdestvenskyi
                - Protoceratops andrewsi

== Paleobiology ==
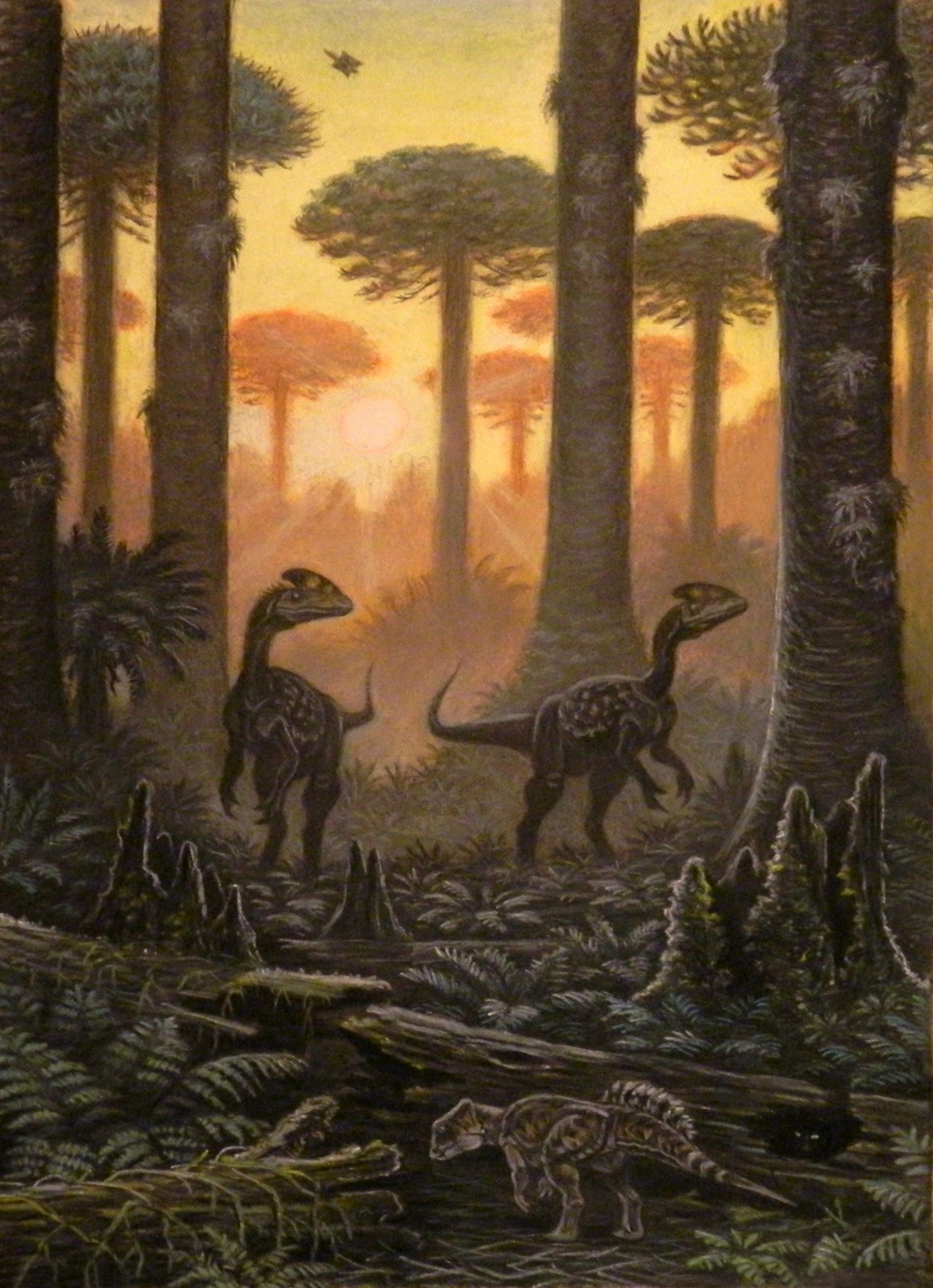
Restoration of Yinlong hiding from two Guanlong

=== Diet ===
Yinlong was discovered with seven gastroliths preserved in the abdominal cavity. Gastroliths, stones stored in the digestive tract and used to grind plant material, are also found in other ceratopsians such as Psittacosaurus, and are also widely distributed in most other dinosaur groups, including birds.

=== Growth ===
In 2024, bone histology based on specimens of various ontogenetic stage (1 early juvenile, 2 late juveniles, 4 subadults and 3 adults) suggested that Yinlong reached sexual maturity at 6 years old, much younger than the age of sexual maturity for Psittacosaurus but older than that for ceratopsids. The study also found evidence of growth rates higher than those of extant squamates and crocodiles but lower than those of large-sized dinosaurs and extant mammals and birds.

== See also ==
- Timeline of ceratopsian research
