= Houcheng Formation =

Geological formation in Hebei, China

- Stratigraphic range: Callovian
- Type: Geological formation
- Underlies: Zhangjiakou Formation
- Overlies: Tiaojishan Formation
- Thickness: Up to 1255 metres

Lithology
- Primary: Sandstone, conglomerate
- Other: Volcanics

Location
- Region: East Asia
- Country: China
- Extent: Hebei

The Houcheng Formation is a geological formation in Hebei, China whose strata date back to the Upper Middle Jurassic. The lithology primarily consists of sandstone and conglomerate deposited in fluvial, alluvial fan and fan delta conditions, with interbeds of volcanic rocks. Dinosaur remains are among the fossils that have been recovered from the formation.

== Vertebrate paleofauna ==
Genus	Species	Presence	Notes	Images
Xuanhuaceratops	X. nieii	1. Geographically located in Hebei, China.		

== See also ==
- List of dinosaur-bearing rock formations
