= Tianchisaurus =

Tianchisaurus Temporal range: Late Jurassic, 161–153 Ma

Scientific classification
- Kingdom: Animalia
- Phylum: Chordata
- Class: Reptilia
- Clade: Dinosauria
- Clade: †Ornithischia
- Clade: †Thyreophora
- Clade: †Ankylosauria
- Genus: †Tianchisaurus; Dong, 1993

Type species
- †Tianchisaurus nedegoapeferima Dong, 1993

Synonyms
- "Sanghongesaurus" Zhao, 1983

Extinct genus of dinosaurs

Tianchisaurus (meaning "heavenly pool lizard"), also invalidly called Tianchiasaurus and "Jurassosaurus", is a genus of ankylosaurian dinosaur from the Late Jurassic (Oxfordian-Kimmeridgian) Toutunhe Formation of China. While many later-diverging ankylosaurids had bony clubs at the tips of their tails, Tianchisaurus likely lacked such a structure.

== Discovery and naming ==
The holotype (IVPP V. 10614), discovered in 1974, consists of skull fragments, five cervicals, six dorsals, seven sacrals, and three caudals, limb fragments, scutes and some unidentifiable fragments.

The type specimen was informally referred to as "Jurassosaurus" after the 1993 film Jurassic Park, and the species epithet nedegoapeferima is formed from the surnames of the film's main stars: Sam Neill, Laura Dern, Jeff Goldblum, Richard Attenborough, Bob Peck, Martin Ferrero, Ariana Richards, and Joseph Mazzello. Director Steven Spielberg, who funded dinosaur research via the non-profit Dinosaur Society donated $25,000 to name the dinosaur in honor of the cast as a "wrap" present at the completion of filming. Dinosaur Society founder, Don Lessem proposed the name Jurassosaurus nedegoaperferkamorum ("ne" for Same Neill, "de" for Laura Dern, "go" for Jeff Goldblum, "a" for Sir Richard Attenborough, etc) Dong Zhiming ultimately discarded the genus name "Jurassosaurus" (which is now a nomen nudum) in favor of Tianchisaurus, but retained the species name honoring the actors. The description paper uses the spellings Tianchiasaurus and Tianchisaurus interchangeably, but is spelled with the extra "a" in the section naming it as a new genus. In 1994, Dong published an erratum stating that Tianchisaurus is the correct name.

"Sanghongesaurus", mentioned by Zhao Xijin (1983), is sometimes referred to as a basal ornithischian or a synonym of Tianchisaurus.

== See also ==
- Timeline of ankylosaur research
