= Sexual dimorphism in dinosaurs =

Differences between male and female animals

Sexual dimorphism in dinosaurs refers to the different physical characteristics of male and female dinosaurs of the same species. This means that the male and female dinosaurs of a species may differ in size, color, shape, or they may even look like a completely different species altogether, such as in the case of the anglerfish. These differing physical characteristics can also be the deciding factor for choosing a mate or can be helpful for blending into the surrounding environment. Researching sexual dimorphism in extinct dinosaurs can be extremely difficult because suitable tissue and skeletal samples are required for testing, and most fossils and other samples have been damaged by decomposition and fossilization.

== Sexual dimorphism and dinosaurs ==
Examining fossils of dinosaurs in search of sexually dimorphic characteristics requires the supply of complete and articulated skeletal and tissue remains. As terrestrial organisms, dinosaur carcasses are subject to ecological and geographical influence that inevitably constitutes the degree of preservation. The availability of well-preserved remains is not a probable outcome as a consequence of decomposition and fossilization. Some paleontologists have looked for sexual dimorphism among dinosaurs using statistics and comparison to ecologically or phylogenetically related modern animals.

== Examples of sexual dimorphism in dinosaurs ==
The following are summarized academic researches conducted by paleontologists, Roy Chapman and Paul Penkalski. Although these studies aren't conclusive in providing factual information, they do provide an insightful perspective.

Apatosaurus and Diplodocus

Female Apatosaurus and Diplodocus had interconnected caudal vertebrae that allowed them to keep their tails elevated to aid in copulation. Discovering that this fusion occurred in only 50% of Apatosaurus and Diplodocus skeletons and 25% of Camarasaurus skeletons indicated that this is a sexually dimorphic trait.

Theropoda

It has been hypothesized that male theropods possessed a retractable penis, a feature similar to modern day crocodilians. Crocodilian skeletons were examined to determine whether there is a skeletal component that is distinctive between both sexes, to help provide an insight on the physical disparities between male and female theropods. Findings revealed the caudal chevrons of male crocodiles, used to anchor the penis muscles, were significantly larger than those of females. There have been criticisms of these findings, but it remains a subject of debate among advocates and adversaries.

Ornithopoda

Studies of sexual dimorphism in hadrosaurs have generally centered on the distinctive cranial crests, which likely provided a function in sexual display. A biometric study of 36 skulls found sexual dimorphism was exhibited in the crest of 3 species of hadrosaurids. The crests could be categorized as full (male) or narrow (female) and may have given some advantage in intrasexual mating-competition.

Ceratopsians

According to Scott D. Sampson, if ceratopsids were to exhibit sexual dimorphism, modern ecological analogues suggest it would be found in display structures, such as horns and frills. No convincing evidence for sexual dimorphism in body size or mating signals is known in ceratopsids, although there is evidence that the more primitive ceratopsian Protoceratops andrewsi possessed sexes that were distinguishable based on frill and nasal prominence size. This is consistent with other known tetrapod groups where midsized animals tend to exhibit markedly more sexual dimorphism than larger ones. However, it has been proposed that these differences can be better explained by intraspecific and ontogenic variation rather than sexual dimorphism. In addition, many sexually dimorphic traits that may have existed in ceratopsians include soft tissue variations such as coloration or dewlaps, which would be unlikely to have been preserved in the fossil record.

=== Stegosaurians ===
A 2015 study on specimens of Hesperosaurus mjosi found evidence of sexual dimorphism in the shape of the dermal plates. Two plate morphs were described: one was short, wide, and oval-shaped, the other taller and narrower.
