= Xu Xing (paleontologist) =

Chinese paleontologist (born 1969)

- Chinese: 徐星
Transcriptions
Standard Mandarin
- Hanyu Pinyin: Xú Xīng
- Wade–Giles: Hsü^{2} Hsing^{1}
- IPA: [ɕy̌ ɕíŋ]

Xu Xing (Chinese: 徐星; pinyin: Xú Xīng; born July 1969) is a Chinese paleontologist who has named more dinosaurs than any other living paleontologist. Such dinosaurs include the Jurassic ceratopsian Yinlong, the Jurassic tyrannosauroid Guanlong, the large oviraptorosaur Gigantoraptor, and the troodontid Mei.

== Biography ==
Xing was born in Xinjiang, China, in 1969. A graduate from the department of geology of Peking University, he is currently a researcher at the Institute of Vertebrate Paleontology and Paleoanthropology of the Chinese Academy of Sciences in Beijing. He had originally planned to become an economist. However, he was assigned to the department of geology by the Chinese authorities. He graduated in 1995, and claims inspiration from Roy Chapman Andrews.

Among Xu's paleontological contributions have been discovery and analysis of dinosaur fossils with avian characteristics, and development of theories in regarding the evolution of feathers. In 2024, Xu became a laureate of the Asian Scientist 100 by the Asian Scientist. He was elected a Fellow of the Royal Society in 2026.

== Genera described by Xu Xing ==
Name	Year	Status	Coauthor(s)		Notes	Images
Archaeovolans	2002	Junior synonym	Stephen Czerkas		Junior synonym of Yanornis.	
Beipiaosaurus	1999	Valid taxon.	Tang Z.	Wang Xiaolin		
Changzhousaurus	2026	Valid taxon.				
Chaoyangsaurus	1999	Valid taxon.	Zhao Xijin	Cheng Z.		
Dilong	2004	Valid taxon.	Mark Norell; Kuang Xuewen; Wang Xiaolin	Zhao Qi; Jia Chengkai		
Erliansaurus	2002	Valid taxon.	Zhang Z.; Paul Sereno; Zhao Xijin	Kuang X.; Han J.; Tan L.		
Eshanosaurus	2001	Valid taxon.	Zhao Xijin	James M. Clark		
Gigantoraptor	2007	Valid taxon.	Tan Q.; Wang J.	Zhao Xijin; Tan L.		
Graciliraptor	2004	Valid taxon.	Wang Xiaolin			
Guanlong	2006	Valid taxon.	James M. Clark; C. Forster; Mark Norell	Greg Erickson; D. Eberth; Jia C.; Zhao Q.		
Hongshanosaurus	2003	Nomen dubium	You Hailu	Wang Xiaolin	May be junior synonym of Psittacosaurus.	
Incisivosaurus	2000	Valid taxon.	Cheng Y.; Wang Xiaolin	Chang C.		
Jeholosaurus	2000	Valid taxon.	Wang Xiaolin	You Hailu		
Jinzhousaurus	2001	Valid taxon.	Wang Xiaolin			
Liaoceratops	2002	Valid taxon.				
Liaoningosaurus	2001	Valid taxon.	Wang Xiaolin	You Hailu		
Limusaurus	2009	Valid taxon.	James M. Clark; Jinyou Mo; Jonah Choiniere; Catherine A. Forster; Gregory M. Erickson; David W. E. Hone; Corwin Sullivan	David A. Eberth; Sterling Nesbitt; Qi Zhao; Rene Hernandez; Cheng-kai Jia; Feng-lu Han; Yu Guo		
Lingwulong	2018	Valid taxon.	Upchurch, P.; Mannion, P.; Barrett, P.; Regalado-Fernandez, O.	Ma, J.; Liu, H.; Mo, J.		
Linheraptor	2010	Valid taxon.	Choinere, J.; Pittman, M.; Tan, Q.; Xiao, D.; Li, Z.	Tan, L.; Clark, J.; Norell, M.; Hone, D.W.E.; Sullivan		
Mei long	2004	Valid taxon.	Mark Norell			
Microraptor	2000	Valid taxon.	Zhou Zhonghe	Wang Xiaolin		
Nanyangosaurus	2000	Valid taxon.	Zhao; Lu; Huang	Li; Dong		
Neimongosaurus	2001	Valid taxon.	Zhang X.; Paul Sereno	Kwang; Tan		
Pedopenna	2005	Valid taxon.	Zhang Fucheng			
Sinornithosaurus	1999	Valid taxon.	Wang Xiaolin	Wu Xiao-Chun		
Sinovenator	2002	Valid taxon.	Mark Norell; Peter Makovicky	Wang Xiaolin; Wu Xiao-Chun		
Sinusonasus	2004	Valid taxon.	Wang Xiaolin			
Sonidosaurus	2006	Valid taxon.	Zhang X.; Tan Q.	Zhao Xijin; Tan L.		
Xinjiangovenator	2005	Valid taxon.	Oliver Rauhut		Previously described as a specimen of Phaedrolosaurus by Dong Zhiming in 1973.	
Xixianykus	2010	Valid taxon.	De-You Wang; Corwin Sullivan; David W. E. Hone	Feng-Lu Han; Rong-Hao Yan; Fu-Ming Du		
Yi	2015	Valid taxon.	Zheng Xiaoting; Corwin Sullivan; Wang Xiaoli; Xing Lida; Wang Yan	Zhang Xiaomei; Jingmai O'Connor; Zhang Fucheng; Pan Yanhong		
Yinlong	2006	Valid taxon.	C. Forster; James M. Clark	Mark Norell; Mo J.		
Yixianosaurus	2003	Valid taxon.	Wang Xiaolin			
Yutyrannus	2012	Valid taxon.	Kebai Wang; Ke Zhang; Qingyu Ma; Lida Xing	Corwin Sullivan; Dongyu Hu; Shuqing Cheng; Shuo Wang		
Zhuchengceratops	2010	Valid taxon.	Kebai Wang; Xijin Zhao	Corwin Sullivan; Shuqing Chen		

== Selected publications ==
- Xu, Xing; Norell, Mark A; et al. (2004). "Basal tyrannosauroids from China and evidence for protofeathers in tyrannosauroids" (PDF). Nature. 431 (7009): 680–684. Bibcode:2004Natur.431..680X. doi:10.1038/nature02855. PMID 15470426. S2CID 4381777. Archived from the original (PDF) on 2012-04-02.
- Xu, Xing; Clark, James M; Forster, Catherine A; et al. (2006). "A basal tyrannosauroid dinosaur from the Late Jurassic of China" (PDF). Nature. 9 (7077): 715–718. Bibcode:2006Natur.439..715X. doi:10.1038/nature04511. PMID 16467836. S2CID 4424849.
- Xu, Xing; et al. (2007). "A gigantic bird-like dinosaur from the Late Cretaceous of China" (PDF). Nature. 447 (7146): 844–847. Bibcode:2007Natur.447..844X. doi:10.1038/nature05849. PMID 17565365. S2CID 6649123.
- Xu, Xing; et al. (2009). "A new feather type in a nonavian theropod and the early evolution of feathers". Proceedings of the National Academy of Sciences of the United States of America. 106 (3): 832–834. doi:10.1073/pnas.0810055106. PMC 2630069. PMID 19139401.
- Xu, X.; et al. (2012). "A gigantic feathered dinosaur from the Lower Cretaceous of China" (PDF). Nature. 484 (7392): 92–95. Bibcode:2012Natur.484...92X. doi:10.1038/nature10906. PMID 22481363. S2CID 29689629. Archived from the original (PDF) on April 17, 2012.
- Xu, Xing; et al. (2015). "A bizarre Jurassic maniraptoran theropod with preserved evidence of membranous wings". Nature. 521 (7550): 70–73. Bibcode:2015Natur.521...70X. doi:10.1038/nature14423. ISSN 1476-4687. PMID 25924069. S2CID 205243599.

== See also ==
- Category:Taxa named by Xu Xing
