= Zhao Xijin =

Chinese paleontologist

Zhao Xijin (赵喜进; born c. 1935 died July 21, 2012) was a Chinese paleontologist notable for having named numerous dinosaurs. He was a professor at Beijing's Institute of Vertebrate Paleontology and Paleoanthropology.

== Biography ==
Zhao Xijin was born c.1935 in China.

=== Career ===
Paul Sereno and Zhao went on a dinosaur fossil hunt in 2005 to Tibet to look for a site that Zhao had found 27 years prior. Before this hunt, in 2001, they had been engaged in a dig in the Gobi Desert. This involved a rock quarry that led them to finding 25 skeletons of the species Sinornithomimus dongi.

In 2008, Zhao was involved in and in charge of a dig in Zhucheng that consisted of digging out a "980 ft-long pit". The site has unearthed more than 7,600 fossils through Xijin's work. It is believed to be the largest such site in the world. The majority of the fossils found appeared to be from the Late Cretaceous period.

He died in 2012 at the age of 77.

== List of dinosaurs named ==
- Chaoyangsaurus (1983)
- Chinshakiangosaurus (1986)
- Dachongosaurus (1986)
- Damalasaurus (1986)
- Klamelisaurus (1993)
- Kunmingosaurus (1986)
- Lancangjiangosaurus (1986)
- Megacervixosaurus (1983)
- Microdontosaurus (1983)
- Monkonosaurus (1990)
- Monolophosaurus (with P. Currie, 1994)
- Ngexisaurus (1983)
- Sangonghesaurus (1983)
- Sinraptor (with P. Currie, 1993)
- Oshanosaurus (1986)
- Xuanhuasaurus (1986)

Besides the above, Zhao Xijin also named the family Mamenchisauridae (with Young Chung Chien, 1972).

== See also ==
- Category:Taxa named by Zhao Xijin
