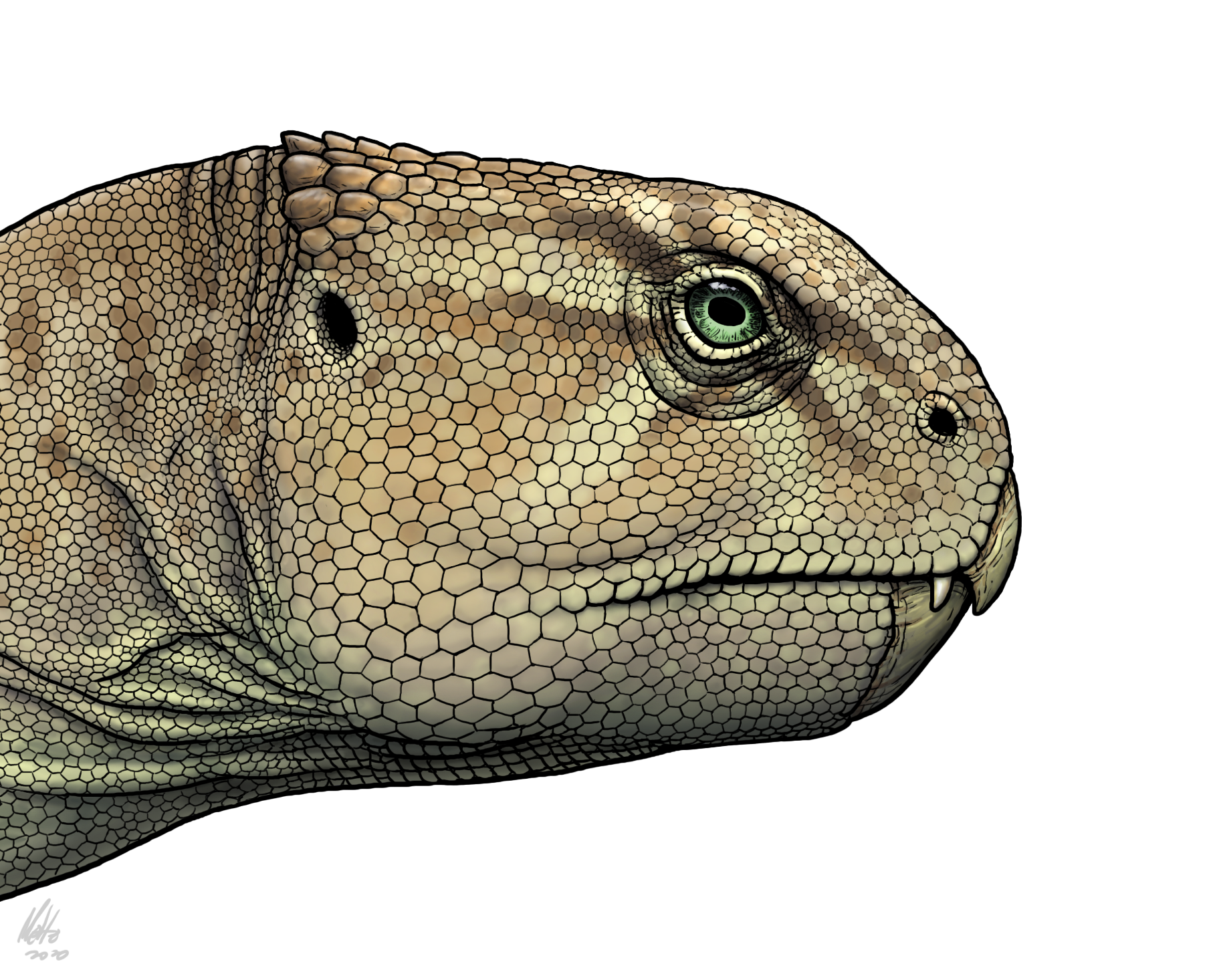
- Reconstructed head of Xuanhuaceratops niei

Scientific classification
- Domain: Eukaryota
- Kingdom: Animalia
- Phylum: Chordata
- Clade: Dinosauria
- Clade: †Ornithischia
- Clade: †Ceratopsia
- Family: †Chaoyangsauridae
- Genus: †Xuanhuaceratops; Zhao et al., 2006

Type species
- †Xuanhuaceratops niei Zhao et al., 2006

= Xuanhuaceratops =

Xuanhuaceratops Temporal range: Late Jurassic, 150.8–145.5 Ma

Extinct genus of dinosaurs

Xuanhuaceratops (meaning "Xuanhua horned face") is a genus of dinosaur from the Late Jurassic Period. The genus was in 2006 dated to the Tithonian, 150.8-145.5 million years ago. A member of the family Chaoyangsauridae, it was one of the earliest ceratopsians. The fossils were found in the Houcheng Formation of Hebei Province, northeastern China.

== Discovery ==
Xuanhuaceratops niei is known only from four fragmentary skeletons recovered from the Houcheng Formation of Hebei Province, China. The first of these was a single, fragmentary skeleton discovered in the 1970s by Nie Rongzhen, near Yanjiagou. The species name Xuanhuasaurus niei was published by Zhao Xijin in a 1985 study, but without a description (or even a specified holotype) making it an invalid nomen nudum.

In the summer of 2003, fossil fragments from three additional specimens were discovered. However, these specimens were less complete than their predecessor, and so the original specimen was made the holotype when in 2006 the type species Xuanhuaceratops niei was named in the journal Acta Geologica Sinica by Zhao Xijin, Cheng Zhengwu, Xu Xing, and Peter J. Makovicky. The generic name combines a reference to the Xuanhan region with Greek keras, "horn", and ops, "face". The specific name honours Nie, who donated the holotype, as discoverer.

The holotype IVPP 12722 consists of a partial skeleton with skull. It contains both praemaxillae, the left maxilla, the left jugal bone, the left postorbital, the partial right postorbital, the right quadratojugal, both quadrates, parts of both pterygoids, the right epipterygoid, the processus coronoidei of both lower jaws, the left angular, the right dentary, loose teeth, two neck vertebrae, parts of the back vertebrae, a sacrum, a front tail vertebra, the left shoulder girdle, both humeri, the proximal part of the left ischium, the right thighbone, parts of the right shinbone and the first, second and third metatarsal. The holotype was probably a fully grown individual.

The referred specimens include IVPP V14527 and IVPP V14528, two partial skeletons with skulls, found together. They differ in size. Specimen IVPP V14529 consists of jaw fragments. IVPP V14528 complements the holotype with an atlas intercentrum and an astragalus. The material was prepared by Wang Haijun.

== Description ==
In 2006, the total body length of Xuanhuaceratops was estimated at one metre. In 2010, Gregory S. Paul estimated the weight at six kilogrammes. The animal was seen as facultatively bipedal in view of its slender upper arm bones, just four centimetres long, and bowed thighbone.

In 2006, a number of distinguishing traits were indicated. They represented a unique combination of characters in themselves not unique. The premaxilla bears only a single tooth. At the rear edge of an enlarged infratemporal fenestra, the quadratojugal only slightly overlaps the quadrate. The shaft of the quadrate is obliquely pointed to the rear and below. The condyles of the quadrate are separated by a deep saddle-shaped trough. The inner side of the lower jaw joint is expanded into a half-crescent process. The outer wall of the dentary is thickened and covered by a pattern of anastomosing grooves and ridges.

The skeletons share a number of distinct features with a potential close relative, Chaoyangsaurus, discovered in the adjacent province of Liaoning. A clear difference is that the latter has two premaxillary teeth per side. With Chaoyangsaurus the connection between the quadratojugal and the quadrate is more extensive. The scapula or shoulder blade of Xuanhuaceratops has an acromion that is placed more distal than the shoulder joint, while that of Chaoyangsaurus is on a level with the joint.

== Classification ==
Based on morphological similarities, Zhao Xijin initially considered the species one of three so-called "prototype psittacosaurids" along with Dianchungosaurus and Chaoyoungosaurus, which together made up the "chaoyoungosaurids". This family was invalid because of lacking a validly named type genus. Also, Dianchungosaurus was later shown to be a crocodylomorph.

Xuanhuaceratops niei was in 2006 placed in the Chaoyangsauridae, a clade in phylogenetic analyses recovered as a lineage of Ceratopsia basal to all neoceratopsians and psittacosaurids.

== See also ==
- Timeline of ceratopsian research
