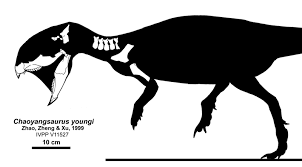
- Skeletal restoration showing known material

Scientific classification
- Kingdom: Animalia
- Phylum: Chordata
- Class: Reptilia
- Clade: Dinosauria
- Clade: †Ornithischia
- Clade: †Ceratopsia
- Family: †Chaoyangsauridae
- Genus: †Chaoyangsaurus; Zhao, Cheng, & Xu, 1999
- Species: †C. youngi

Binomial name
- †Chaoyangsaurus youngi Zhao, Cheng, & Xu, 1999

= Chaoyangsaurus =

Chaoyangsaurus Temporal range: Late Jurassic, 148 Ma

Extinct genus of dinosaurs

Chaoyangsaurus ("Chaoyang lizard") is a genus of marginocephalian dinosaur from the Late Jurassic (about between 150.8 and 145.5 million years ago) of China. Chaoyangsaurus belonged to the Ceratopsia (Greek for "horned faces"). Chaoyangsaurus, like all ceratopsians, was primarily a herbivore.

== Discovery and naming ==
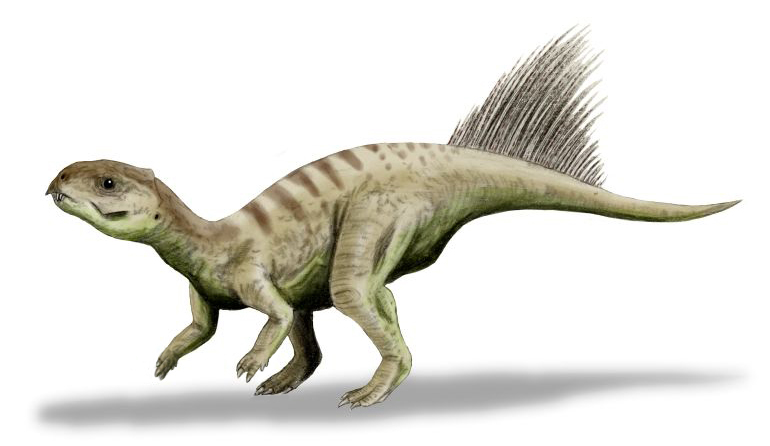
Life restoration

In 1976, the remains of Chaoyangsaurus were found by Cheng Zhengwu at Ershijiazi, in the Chaoyang area of Liaoning Province in northeastern China. The fossil was added to a travelling exhibition.

Unlike many other dinosaurs, Chaoyangsaurus had been discussed in a number of sources before its official publication. As a result of this, several different spellings of its name have come and gone as invalid nomina nuda ("naked names", names with no formal description behind them). The first name to see print was "Chaoyoungosaurus", which appeared in the guidebook to a Japanese museum exhibit, and was the result of an incorrect transliteration from the Chinese into the Latin alphabet. Zhao Xijin in 1983 also used this spelling when he first discussed the species, again lacking a description so it is technically a nomen nudum. Two years later, Zhao again used this early spelling when he assigned a type specimen and species name, "Chaoyoungosaurus liaosiensis".

According to Dong Zhiming in 1992, the name Chaoyoungosaurus had been officially described in a separate paper by Zhao and Cheng in 1983, but no cite for this paper was given, and later Cheng and Zhao themselves did not treat this name as valid, perhaps because the paper had not actually been published. Dong, in his 1992 book on Chinese dinosaur faunae, also emended the name to the "correct" spelling of "Chaoyangosaurus" (note the extra letter "o"). However, since this renaming was not accompanied by a formal description of the dinosaur, "Chaoyangosaurus" must also be considered a nomen nudum.

It was not until 1999 that the dinosaur finally received an official name. Paul Sereno in 1999 used the name "Chaoyangsaurus" in an overview of dinosaurian evolution. Once again, that name was a nomen nudum. However, in December of that year, Cheng, Zhao, and Xu Xing published an official description using the name Chaoyangsaurus youngi, and as the first name for this genus that is not a nomen nudum, it has official priority over all other spellings that have been used. The generic name refers to Chaoyang. The specific name honours the Chinese paleontologist Yang Zhongjian ("C. C. Young") as the founder of Chinese vertebrate paleontology.

The holotype, IGCAGS V371, has been found in a layer of the Tuchengzi Formation that was in 1999 dated to the late Tithonian. It consists of a partial skeleton with skull. It contains the lower part and braincase of the skull, the lower jaws, seven neck vertebrae, the right shoulder blade and the right humerus. It represents an adult individual. The fossil was prepared by Ding Jinzhao and Wang Haijun.

== Description ==
In 2010, Gregory S. Paul estimated the length of Chaoyangsaurus at 1 metre (3.3 ft) and the weight at 6 kilograms (13 lb).

The describing authors indicated some distinguishing traits. The boss on the jugal bone is only weakly developed and has a smooth surface. The convex quadratojugal bone overlaps the rear of the shaft of the quadrate bone. The quadrate lacks a wide side surface, not being expanded to the front. The rear lower edge of the quadrate is convex. The coronoid process of the lower jaw is low with a flat top. The planes of the side surface and the underside of the angular bone are separated by a ridge. The last five traits were considered autapomorphies.

The skull is fourteen centimetres long. Per side, the appending lower cutting edge of the rostral bone, in life probably covered by horn, bears four crenulations. More to the rear, there are two conical premaxillary teeth, jutting out to below. The transversely flattened maxillary teeth number eight or nine, while there are eleven dentary teeth in the lower jaw for a maximal total of forty-four teeth for the head as a whole. The cheek teeth are imbricated and vertically rather long. Both inner and outer sides are covered by enamel.

== Phylogeny ==
In 1999, Chaoyangosaurus was placed in the Ceratopsia, in a basal position. There were doubts whether it was outside or inside the Neoceratopia.

In 2006, Zhao, et al defined a Chaoyangsauridae, as the most basal ceratopian clade.

== See also ==
- Timeline of ceratopsian research
