= List of vertebrate fauna of the Campanian stage =

This is an incomplete list that briefly describes vertebrates that were extant during the Campanian, a stage of the Late Cretaceous Period which extended from 83.6 to 72.1 million years before present. Animals that lived in the Campanian include:

== Cartilaginous fish ==
=== Chimaeriformes ===
Chimaeras of the Campanian
Taxa	Presence	Location	Description	Images
†Amylodon: 1. †A. karamysh	Campanian – Rupelian	Russia	Amylodon is an extinct genus of chimaera, it was considered to be a member of Chimaeridae but other studies have assigned it to either "Edaphodontidae" or Rhinochimaeridae.	Callorhinchus, an extant genus of basal chimaeriforms with a fossil record extending back to middle Cretaceous. It was morphologically similar, if not closely related, to many directly confirmed Campanian genera of chimaeras.
†Edaphodon: 1. † E. mirificus 2. † E. hesperis 3. † E. kawai	Cretaceous–Neogene	North America	Edaphodon is an extinct genus of chimaera. It is sometimes placed in the "Edaphodontidae", an unclearly defined group of chimaera with an uncertain position within the clade.	Callorhinchus, an extant genus of basal chimaeriforms with a fossil record extending back to middle Cretaceous. It was morphologically similar, if not closely related, to many directly confirmed Campanian genera of chimaeras.
†Elasmodus: 1. † E. greenoughi	Cretaceous–Paleogene	North America	Elasmodus is an extinct genus of chimaera. It is sometimes placed in the "Edaphodontidae".	Callorhinchus, an extant genus of basal chimaeriforms with a fossil record extending back to middle Cretaceous. It was morphologically similar, if not closely related, to many directly confirmed Campanian genera of chimaeras.
†Ischyodus: 1. †I. bifurcatus	Middle Jurassic – Miocene.	Russia; USA	Ischyodus is an extinct genus of chimaera. It is sometimes placed in the "Edaphodontidae", while other authors place it into the extant Callorhinchidae.	Callorhinchus, an extant genus of basal chimaeriforms with a fossil record extending back to middle Cretaceous. It was morphologically similar, if not closely related, to many directly confirmed Campanian genera of chimaeras.

=== †Hybodontiformes ===
Hybodonts of the Campanian
Taxa	Presence	Location	Description	Images
†Lonchidion: 1. †L. selachos 2. †L. griffisi 3. †L. babulskii	Ladinian–Maastrichtian	1. †L. selachos: Saskatchewan, Canada; USA; 2. †L. griffisi: Wyoming	Lonchidion selachos and Lonchidion griffisi were among the latest surviving species of hybodont. Lonchidion species were originally included to the closely related but earlier genus of Lissodus.	Hybodus, a close relative of Meristodonoides which' species were once included into it.
†Meristodonoides: 1. †M. montanensis	Aptian–Maastrichtian	Montana and Wyoming, USA	Meristodonoides montanensis was one of the latest surviving species of hybodont, it was, along with the type species of its genus, originally described as a species of the earlier genus Hybodus.	Hybodus, a close relative of Meristodonoides which' species were once included into it.

=== Selachimorpha ===
Sharks of the Campanian
Taxa	Presence	Location	Description	Images
†Adnetoscyllium: 1. †A. angloparisensis	Santonian to Campanian	Anglo-Paris Basin, France and the United Kingdom	Adnetoscyllium is an extinct monotypic genus of bamboo shark. It can be told apart from most other related genera via its lack of lateral cusplets.	Chlamydoselachus Cretoxyrhina Squalicorax
†Anomotodon: 1. †A. hermani	Early Cretaceous to Eocene	Sweden	Anomotodon is an extinct genus of shark related to the extant goblin shark.	Chlamydoselachus Cretoxyrhina Squalicorax
†Archaeotriakis: 1. †A. rochelleae 2. †A. ornatus	Campanian	Judith River Formation, Montana; Bearpaw Formation, Alberta	Archaeotriakis is an extinct genus of false catshark. It is known from two species, mainly from isolated teeth.	Chlamydoselachus Cretoxyrhina Squalicorax
Chlamydoselachus: 1. †C. balli 2. †C. gracilis	Campanian-present	Northumberland Formation, British Columbia, Canada; Angola	A genus of chlamydoselachid sharks, it includes the modern frilled shark and Southern African frilled shark.	Chlamydoselachus Cretoxyrhina Squalicorax
Carcharias: 1. †C. latus	Late Cretaceous-present	Europe	Carcharias is a genus of mackerel sharks belonging to the family Odontaspididae. Once bearing many prehistoric species, all have gone extinct with the exception of the critically endangered sand tiger shark.	Chlamydoselachus Cretoxyrhina Squalicorax
†Chiloscyllium: 1. †C.missouriense; 2. †C. gaemersi	Cenomanian to present	North America; Europe	A genus of bamboo shark. Many species survive to this day.	Chlamydoselachus Cretoxyrhina Squalicorax
†Cretalamna: 1. †C. appendiculata	Late Albian-Lutetian (103.13–46.25 mya)	North Africa; Middle East; North America	Cretalamna is a genus of extinct medium to large-sized shark in the family Otodontidae. It is considered by many to be the ancestor of the largest sharks to have ever lived.	Chlamydoselachus Cretoxyrhina Squalicorax
†Cretorectolobus: 1. †C. olsoni	Hauterivian-Maastrichtian	Aguja Formation, Mexico; Dinosaur Park Formation, Alberta; Judith River Formation, Saskatchewan, Canada and Montana, United States; Mesaverde Group, Wyoming; Åsen and Ignaberga, Sweden	Cretorectolobus is an extinct carpet shark. The type species is C. olsoni, which existed during the Campanian in Canada and the United States.	Chlamydoselachus Cretoxyrhina Squalicorax
†Cretoxyrhina: 1. †C. mantelli	Albian-Campanian 107.59–73.2 mya	North America; Sweden	Cretoxyrhina was one of the largest sharks of its time. It had convergently evolved similar appearance and build to the modern great white shark but it was only distantly related within Lamniformes. It was an apex predator in its ecosystem and preyed on a large variety of marine animals including mosasaurs, plesiosaurs, sharks and other large fish, pterosaurs, and occasionally dinosaurs. Cretoxyrhina was also among the fastest-swimming sharks, with hydrodynamic calculations suggesting burst speeds of up to 70 km/h.	Chlamydoselachus Cretoxyrhina Squalicorax
†Dykeius: 1. †D. garethi	Late Campanian	Angola; Northumberland Formation, British Columbia, Canada; Antarctica.	A very large chlamydoselachid shark and one of the biggest species of Hexanchiformes to have ever lived, might had surpassed lengths of 7 meters.	Chlamydoselachus Cretoxyrhina Squalicorax
†Komoksodon: 1. †K. kwutchakuth	Campanian to Selandian	Northumberland Formation, Canada; Angola; New Zealand	Komoksodon is an extinct genus of hexanchiform shark. It is the only member of the monotypic family Komoksodontidae.	Chlamydoselachus Cretoxyrhina Squalicorax
†Paraorthacodus: 1. †P. andersoni 2. †P. conicus	Early Jurassic–Eocene	Montana, North America; Sweden	Paraorthacodus is an extinct genus of shark. It a member of the family Paraorthacodontidae, though it was formerly regarded as a member of the family Palaeospinacidae, which is either placed in Hexanchiformes or in Synechodontiformes. It is known from over a dozen named species spanning from the Early Jurassic to the Paleocene, or possibly Eocene. Almost all members of the genus are exclusively known from isolated teeth, with the exception of P. jurensis from the Late Jurassic-Early Cretaceous of Europe, which is known from full body fossils from the Late Jurassic of Germany, which suggest that juveniles had a robust body with a round head, while adults had large body sizes with a fusiform profile.	Chlamydoselachus Cretoxyrhina Squalicorax
†Pseudocorax: 1. †P. affinis 2. †P. granti 3. †P. laevis	Cenomanian-Maastrichtian	Middle East; Europe; North America	Pseudocorax is an extinct genus of mackerel sharks. It contains six valid species. It was formerly assigned to the family Anacoracidae, but is now placed in its own family Pseudocoracidae	Chlamydoselachus Cretoxyrhina Squalicorax
†Ptychodus: 1. †P. polygyrus	Early-Late Cretaceous, 112–75 mya	North America	Ptychodus is an extinct genus of very large durophagous lamniform shark, previously thought as the largest known hybodont.	Chlamydoselachus Cretoxyrhina Squalicorax
†Rolfodon: 1. †R. goliath 2. †R. ludvigseni 3. †R. thompsoni	Campanian-Late Miocene	Angola; Northumberland Formation, British Columbia, Canada; Antarctica.	A genus of chlamydoselachid sharks, many species, like the Campanian R. goliath and R. ludvigseni, reached length of above 4 meters.	Chlamydoselachus Cretoxyrhina Squalicorax
(†)Scapanorhynchus: 1. †S texanus 2. †S. rapax 3. †(?)S. subulatus	Albian-Miocene	Egypt; Syria; North America	Scapanorhynchus is an extinct genus of mitsukurinid shark that lived from the early Cretaceous until possibly the Miocene if S. subulatus is a and not a sand shark. Their extreme similarities to the living goblin shark, Mitsukurina owstoni, lead some experts to consider reclassifying it as Scapanorhynchus owstoni.	Chlamydoselachus Cretoxyrhina Squalicorax
†Serratolamna: 1. †S. serrata 2. †S. khderii	Late Cretaceous–Paleocene	Europe; North America	Serratolamna is an extinct genus of mackerel sharks that is placed in the monotypic family Serratolamnidae.	Chlamydoselachus Cretoxyrhina Squalicorax
†Squalicorax: 1. †S. falcatus 2. †S. kaupi 3. †S. pristodontus	Albian-Maastrichtian	Egypt; Europe; North America	Squalicorax, commonly known as the "crow shark", is a genus of extinct lamniform shark. Squalicorax was a medium-sized shark, typically measuring about 1.8–3 metres (5.9–9.8 ft) long. The largest specimen of S. pristodontus was significantly larger, measuring up to 4.8 metres (16 ft) long.	Chlamydoselachus Cretoxyrhina Squalicorax
†Squatirhina	Late Cretaceous	Aguja and Pen Formations of Big Bend National Park, Texas	Squatirhina is an extinct genus of cartilaginous fish, possibly an orectolobid carpet shark.	Chlamydoselachus Cretoxyrhina Squalicorax
†Synechodus: 1. †S. turneri 2. †S. filipi	Late Triassic–Palaeocene	USA; Europe	Synechodus is an extinct genus of shark belonging to the family Palaeospinacidae and order Synechodontiformes. It is known from 16 species primarily spanning from the Late Triassic to Paleocene.	Chlamydoselachus Cretoxyrhina Squalicorax

=== Batoidea ===
Rays of the Campanian
Taxa	Presence	Location	Description	Images
†Agaleorhynchus: 1. †A. britannicus	Middle Santonian to early Campanian	Southern England	A species of ray in the family Ganopristidae of the suborder Sclerorhynchoidei. Sclerorhynchoids are an extinct suborder of rajiforms that superficially resembled the distantly related sawfishes due to convergence but were more closely related to skates.	Sclerorhynchus
†Ankistrorhynchus: 1. †A. washakiensis 2. †A. major	Lower Santonian to Campanian	Mesaverde Formation, Wyoming, USA; New Jersey, USA	A genus of sclerorhynchid sawskate. It is known only isolated rostral teeth.	Sclerorhynchus
†Ischyrhiza: 1. †I. mira 2. †I. avonicola	Turonian-Thanetian ~89.3–55.8 mya	Africa, the Middle East, North America, and South America	A genus of sclerorhynchoid ray.	Sclerorhynchus
†Protoplatyrhina: 1. †P. renae	Late Cretaceous, 94.3–66 mya	USA	An extinct genus of rajiform.	Sclerorhynchus
†Ptychotrygon: 1. †P. blainensis 2. †P. boothi 3. †P. hooveri 4. †P. triangularis 5. †P. vermiculata	Late Cretaceous, 94.3–66 mya	USA	A genus of ptychotrygonid sclerorhynchoid.	Sclerorhynchus
†Rhinobatos: 1. †R. primarmatus 2. †R. intermedius 3. †R. tenuirostris 4. †R. latus	Tithonian-present		A genus of rhinopristiform rays in the Rhinobatidae family.	Sclerorhynchus
†Schizorhiza: 1. †S. stromeri	Santonian-Maastrichtian	Africa, the Middle East, North America, and South America	A genus of schizorhizid sclerorhynchoid.	Sclerorhynchus
†Sclerorhynchus: 1. †S. leptodon 2. †S. karakensis	Turonian-Maastrichtian	Africa, the Middle East, North America, and South America	A genus of ganopristid sclerorhynchoid.	Sclerorhynchus

== Actinopterygii ==
Basal ray-finned fish of the Campanian
Taxa	Presence	Location	Description	Images
†Asarotus	Campanian	Niobrara Formation, North America	Its type species, A. arcanus, is only known from poorly preserved single specimen, which makes hard to classify existing orders of Cretaceous actinopterygians. It was tentatively categorized as a palaeoniscoid but given its recent age and fragmentary nature this placement is unlikely.	

=== Chondrostei ===
Chondrostei of the Campanian
Taxa	Presence	Location	Description	Images
Acipenser	Late Cretaceous to present	North America	Acipenser is a genus of sturgeons. It is the largest genus in the order Acipenseriformes, with 17 living species, others are only known from fossil remains. At least one species, A. albertensis is known from the late Campanian. The genus is paraphyletic, containing all sturgeons that do not belong to Huso, Scaphirhynchus, or Pseudoscaphirhynchus, with many species more closely related to the other three genera than they are to other species of Acipenser.	Acipenser
†Priscosturion	Campanian (77.5 mya)	Judith River Formation, Montana, USA	Priscosturion, initially named Psammorhynchus, is an extinct genus of sturgeon known from one species, P. longipinnis. The fish belongs to the subfamily Priscosturioninae within the larger family Acipenseridae.	Acipenser

=== Holostei ===
Holostei of the Campanian
Taxa	Presence	Location	Description	Images
Amia	Early Cretaceous – present	North America	A genus of amiids which contains all extant bowfin species.	Amia Atractosteus Lepisosteus
†Cyclurus	Late Cretaceous – Eocene	North America	An extinct genus of amiids closely related to bowfin species.	Amia Atractosteus Lepisosteus
Atractosteus	Campanian to present	Americas	A genus of large lepisosteid gars with three extant species.	Amia Atractosteus Lepisosteus
Lepisosteus	Campanian to present	North America, Brazil, France	A genus of lepisosteid gars. Multiple of its species are still extant.	Amia Atractosteus Lepisosteus
†Melvius	Kirtlandian-Lancian (late Campanian-Maastrichtian) 74.8–66 Ma	Kirtland Formation, USA	A genus of large vidalamiin relative of bowfins.	Amia Atractosteus Lepisosteus
†Paralepidosteus	Albian to Campanian	Tanout, Zinder, Niger	One of the latest surviving genera of Semionotiformes.	Amia Atractosteus Lepisosteus

=== Teleosteomorpha ===
Teleosts and closely related fish of the Campanian
Taxa	Presence	Location	Description	Images
†Anomoeodus	Albian to Maastrichtian	France; United States	Anomoeodus is a genus of large pycnodontiform ray-finned fish belonging to the family Pycnodontidae.	Bonnerichthys Cimolichthys Enchodus Gillicus Ichthyodectes Pachyrhizodus Pentanogmius Xiphactinus
†Belonostomus	Late Jurassic–Paleocene	Italy; North America	A genus of aspidorhynchiform fishes within the family Aspidorhynchidae.	Bonnerichthys Cimolichthys Enchodus Gillicus Ichthyodectes Pachyrhizodus Pentanogmius Xiphactinus
†Bonnerichthys	Coniacian to Maastrichtian, 89–66 mya	Smoky Hill Member of the Niobrara Chalk, Pierre Shale, Mooreville Chalk, Demopolis Chalk, Wenonah Formation; North America	A genus of late surviving filter feeding pachycormid fish. It grew to at least 5 meters in total body length, substantially less than the related Leedsichthys from the Jurassic which likely grew up to 16.5 meters.	Bonnerichthys Cimolichthys Enchodus Gillicus Ichthyodectes Pachyrhizodus Pentanogmius Xiphactinus
†Cimolichthys	Cenomanian (99.6 ± 0.9 Mya and 93.5 ± 0.8 Mya) to the Maastrichtian (70.6 ± 0.6 Mya to 66 Mya)	North America; Europe	Cimolichthys is an extinct genus of 1.5- to 2.0-meter-long nektonic predatory aulopiform fish. Although the closest living relatives of Cimolichthys are lancetfish and lizardfish, the living animals would have resembled very large freshwater pikes.	Bonnerichthys Cimolichthys Enchodus Gillicus Ichthyodectes Pachyrhizodus Pentanogmius Xiphactinus
†Coriops	Campanian to Maastrichtian, possibly to Paleocene	Mesa Verde Formation, USA	Coriops is an extinct genus of prehistoric bony fish. Might be an eel, an elopiform, a bonefish or an osteoglossomorph.	Bonnerichthys Cimolichthys Enchodus Gillicus Ichthyodectes Pachyrhizodus Pentanogmius Xiphactinus
†Dactylopogon	Campanian		Dactylopogon is an extinct genus of prehistoric elopiform fish.	Bonnerichthys Cimolichthys Enchodus Gillicus Ichthyodectes Pachyrhizodus Pentanogmius Xiphactinus
†Echidnocephalus	Campanian	Westphalia, Germany	Echidnocephalus troscheli is an extinct, prehistoric halosaur. Fossil specimens suggest an animal already looking very much like modern halosaurs.	Bonnerichthys Cimolichthys Enchodus Gillicus Ichthyodectes Pachyrhizodus Pentanogmius Xiphactinus
†Egertonia	Late Cretaceous-Eocene	Black Creek Group, North Carolina	An extinct genus of bonefish fish in the family Phyllodontidae.	Bonnerichthys Cimolichthys Enchodus Gillicus Ichthyodectes Pachyrhizodus Pentanogmius Xiphactinus
†Enchelurus	Cenomanian–Campanian	UK; Levant	A genus of extinct bony fish, possibly a halosaur.	Bonnerichthys Cimolichthys Enchodus Gillicus Ichthyodectes Pachyrhizodus Pentanogmius Xiphactinus
†Enchodus	Albian-Maastrichtian, ~112.6–66 Ma	North America; Egypt; Israel	An extinct genus of aulopiform ray-finned fish related to lancetfish and lizardfish.	Bonnerichthys Cimolichthys Enchodus Gillicus Ichthyodectes Pachyrhizodus Pentanogmius Xiphactinus
†Eodiaphyodus	Campanian-Maastrichtian	Angola and Nigeria	A genus of extinct durophagous elopiform fish in the suborder Albuloidea.	Bonnerichthys Cimolichthys Enchodus Gillicus Ichthyodectes Pachyrhizodus Pentanogmius Xiphactinus
†Esteesox	Santonian to Campanian	Alberta	An extinct genus of freshwater pikes.	Bonnerichthys Cimolichthys Enchodus Gillicus Ichthyodectes Pachyrhizodus Pentanogmius Xiphactinus
†Gasteroclupea	Campanian to early Danian	Chaunaca Formation, Bolivia	A genus of prehistoric clupeomorph fish that is distantly related to modern anchovies and herrings. It contains one species, G. branisai. It inhabited freshwater or estuarine habitats. Its taxonomic identity was long uncertain, often being placed as a clupeid or an indeterminate clupeomorph, but more recent studies have placed it with the Ellimmichthyiformes.	Bonnerichthys Cimolichthys Enchodus Gillicus Ichthyodectes Pachyrhizodus Pentanogmius Xiphactinus
†Gillicus	100–66 mya	North America	A genus of ichthyodectiform fish in the family Ichthyodectidae. Unlike its larger relative, Xiphactinus, by which it was preyed upon, it was a filter feeder instead of a large prey predator.	Bonnerichthys Cimolichthys Enchodus Gillicus Ichthyodectes Pachyrhizodus Pentanogmius Xiphactinus
†Gwawinapterus	Campanian	Hornby Island, British Columbia, Canada	Gwawinapterus beardi is a species of saurodontid ichthyodectiform fish initially described as a very late-surviving member of the pterosaur family Istiodactylidae.	Bonnerichthys Cimolichthys Enchodus Gillicus Ichthyodectes Pachyrhizodus Pentanogmius Xiphactinus
†Ichthyodectes	Coniacian to Campanian	North America	A genus of large ichthyodectiform fish in the family Ichthyodectidae. Like its larger close relative Xiphactinus was a voracious predator.	Bonnerichthys Cimolichthys Enchodus Gillicus Ichthyodectes Pachyrhizodus Pentanogmius Xiphactinus
†Moorevillia	Campanian	Mooreville Chalk Formation, Alabama	An extinct genus of crossognathiform fish in the family Plethodidae.	Bonnerichthys Cimolichthys Enchodus Gillicus Ichthyodectes Pachyrhizodus Pentanogmius Xiphactinus
†Oldmanesox	Campanian to Maastrichtian	Alberta	An extinct genus of freshwater pikes.	Bonnerichthys Cimolichthys Enchodus Gillicus Ichthyodectes Pachyrhizodus Pentanogmius Xiphactinus
†Pachyrhizodus	Cenomanian–Maastrichtian	USA	An extinct genus of crossognathiform fish in the family Pachyrhizodontidae.	Bonnerichthys Cimolichthys Enchodus Gillicus Ichthyodectes Pachyrhizodus Pentanogmius Xiphactinus
†Paralbula	Late Cretaceous-Early Eocene, 99.7–40.4 mya	North America	An extinct genus of bonefish fish in the family Phyllodontidae.	Bonnerichthys Cimolichthys Enchodus Gillicus Ichthyodectes Pachyrhizodus Pentanogmius Xiphactinus
†Paratarpon	Campanian	North America	An extinct genus of prehistoric elopiform fish in the family Elopidae.	Bonnerichthys Cimolichthys Enchodus Gillicus Ichthyodectes Pachyrhizodus Pentanogmius Xiphactinus
†Pentanogmius	Cenomanian–Campanian	North America	An extinct genus of crossognathiform fish in the family Plethodidae. Pentanogmius evolutus is among the largest known tselfatiiform fish with a length of over 1.7 meters.	Bonnerichthys Cimolichthys Enchodus Gillicus Ichthyodectes Pachyrhizodus Pentanogmius Xiphactinus
†Sardinioides	Campanian	Sendenhorst, Germany	Sardinioides is an extinct genus of prehistoric myctophiform fish, and considered a sister group to Paleogene and modern neoscopelids and myctophids.	Bonnerichthys Cimolichthys Enchodus Gillicus Ichthyodectes Pachyrhizodus Pentanogmius Xiphactinus
†Sardinius	Campanian	Germany	Sardinius is an extinct genus of prehistoric ray finned fish, potentially a myctophiform.	Bonnerichthys Cimolichthys Enchodus Gillicus Ichthyodectes Pachyrhizodus Pentanogmius Xiphactinus
†Sedenhorstia	Cenomanian–Campanian	North America	An extinct genus of prehistoric elopiform fish.	Bonnerichthys Cimolichthys Enchodus Gillicus Ichthyodectes Pachyrhizodus Pentanogmius Xiphactinus
†Telepholis	Cenomanian–Campanian	Sendenhorst, Germany	An extinct genus of aulopiform fish in Cheirothricidae, a family of fish capable of gliding flight over water, like the superficially similar flying fish, but more closely related to lizardfish.	Bonnerichthys Cimolichthys Enchodus Gillicus Ichthyodectes Pachyrhizodus Pentanogmius Xiphactinus
†Xiphactinus	Albian to Maastrichtian	North America; Europe; Australia; Venezuela	A genus of very large ichthyodectiform fish in the family Ichthyodectidae that could reach up to 4 meters in length. Xiphactinus was a voracious predator.	Bonnerichthys Cimolichthys Enchodus Gillicus Ichthyodectes Pachyrhizodus Pentanogmius Xiphactinus

== Actinistia ==
Coelacanths of the Campanian
Taxa	Presence	Location	Description	Images
†Axelrodichthys: 1. †Axelrodichthys megadromos	Lower Campanian possibly to early Maastrichtian	France	A species of averagely sized mawsoniid coelacanth. Related species of the same genus lived mostly on earlier stages of the Cretaceous.	Megalocoelacanthus
†Megalocoelacanthus: 1. Megalocoelocanthus dobiei	Lower Campanian possibly to early Maastrichtian	USA	A very large latimerid coelacanth. It has been estimated to have been 3.5 – 4.5 meters in length.	Megalocoelacanthus

== Dipnoi ==
Lungfish of the Campanian
Taxa	Presence	Location	Description	Images
†Ceratodus	Olenekian-Eocene	Cosmpopolitan	A widespread genus of ceratodontiform lungfish in the family Ceratodontidae with multiple species throughout the mesozoic.	Ceratodus Retodus
†Metaceratodus	Norian-Maastrichtian	Malargüe Group, Argentina	A widespread genus of ceratodontiform lungfish in the family Ceratodontidae with multiple species throughout the mesozoic.	Ceratodus Retodus
Neoceratodus	Albian to Recent	Brazil; Niger	A ceratodontiform lungfish in the family Neoceratodontidae. A species of this genus, the Australian Lungfish, survives to this day.	Ceratodus Retodus
Protopterus	Campanian to Recent	Egypt; Sudan	A ceratodontiform lungfish in the family Protopteridae. Many species of this genus, survive to this day.	Ceratodus Retodus
†Retodus	Albian–Maastrichtian	Egypt; Sudan	A genus of large ceratodontiform lungfish in the family Ceratodontidae.	Ceratodus Retodus

== Amphibians ==
†Amphibians of the Maastrichtian
Taxa	Presence	Location	Description	Images
†Albanerpeton; †Albanerpeton galaktion; †Albanerpeton gracilis; †Albanerpeton nexuosus	105.3–65.043 Ma, Albian to Maastrichtian	Canada USA	A salamander-like albanerpetontid that thrived in North America and Europe from the Early Cretaceous to the late Pliocene.	Albanerpeton nexuosus
†Gobiates; †Gobiates leptocolaptus; †Gobiates khermeentsavis	Aptian-Campanian	Barun Goyot and Djadokhta Formation, Mongolia	Gobiates is an extinct genus of prehistoric frog.	Albanerpeton nexuosus
†Habrosaurus; †Habrosaurus prodilatus	Campanian	Dinosaur Park Formation, Alberta	A large sirenid, about the size of a hellbender. The palate is specialized for crushing, suggesting it may have fed on hard-bodied prey.	Albanerpeton nexuosus
†Opisthotriton; †Opisthotriton kayi	Campanian-Lancian	Dinosaur Park Formation, Alberta	An extinct genus of prehistoric salamanders in the family Batrachosauroididae.	Albanerpeton nexuosus
†Parrisia; †Parrisia neocesariensis	Campanian-Lancian	Ellisdale Fossil Site, Marshalltown Formation, Monmouth County, New Jersey	Parrisia neocesariensis is an extinct species of batrachosauroidid salamander.	Albanerpeton nexuosus
†Scotiophryne; †Scotiophryne pustulosa	125–60.5 Ma, Aptian to Selandian	Hell Creek Formation, Montana, USA Mexico: Saskatchewan, Canada	A little-known frog.	Albanerpeton nexuosus

== Lepidosaurs ==
Lepidosaurs of the Campanian
Taxa	Presence	Location	Description	Images
†Adamisaurus: 1. †A. magnidentatus			An agamid iguanian lizard.	Clidastes Ectenosaurus Estesia Globidens alabamaensis Halisaurus arambourgi Mosasaurus beaugei Mosasaurus lemonnieri Mosasaurus missouriensis Platecarpus tympaniticus Prognathodon lutugini Taniwhasaurus Telmasaurus Tylosaurus pembinensis Tylosaurus proriger
†Aiolosaurus: 1. †A. oriens			A varanoid lizard of disputed affinity.	Clidastes Ectenosaurus Estesia Globidens alabamaensis Halisaurus arambourgi Mosasaurus beaugei Mosasaurus lemonnieri Mosasaurus missouriensis Platecarpus tympaniticus Prognathodon lutugini Taniwhasaurus Telmasaurus Tylosaurus pembinensis Tylosaurus proriger
†Alamitophis: 1. †A. argentinus 2. †A. elongatus			A genus of fossil snakes in the extinct family of Madtsoiidae.	Clidastes Ectenosaurus Estesia Globidens alabamaensis Halisaurus arambourgi Mosasaurus beaugei Mosasaurus lemonnieri Mosasaurus missouriensis Platecarpus tympaniticus Prognathodon lutugini Taniwhasaurus Telmasaurus Tylosaurus pembinensis Tylosaurus proriger
†Anchaurosaurus		Djadochta Formation, Gobi Desert, Mongolia	An iguanian lizard in the extinct clade Gobiguania. Compared to other iguanians, Anchaurosaurus has a relatively elongated skull, large eye sockets, and higher tooth crowns.	Clidastes Ectenosaurus Estesia Globidens alabamaensis Halisaurus arambourgi Mosasaurus beaugei Mosasaurus lemonnieri Mosasaurus missouriensis Platecarpus tympaniticus Prognathodon lutugini Taniwhasaurus Telmasaurus Tylosaurus pembinensis Tylosaurus proriger
†Apsgnathus		Brewster County, Aguja Formation, Texas, USA	A scincomorph.	Clidastes Ectenosaurus Estesia Globidens alabamaensis Halisaurus arambourgi Mosasaurus beaugei Mosasaurus lemonnieri Mosasaurus missouriensis Platecarpus tympaniticus Prognathodon lutugini Taniwhasaurus Telmasaurus Tylosaurus pembinensis Tylosaurus proriger
†Asprosaurus	81 mya	Seonso Conglomerate Formation, South Korea	A genus of anguimorph lizard distantly related to the living Gila monster.	Clidastes Ectenosaurus Estesia Globidens alabamaensis Halisaurus arambourgi Mosasaurus beaugei Mosasaurus lemonnieri Mosasaurus missouriensis Platecarpus tympaniticus Prognathodon lutugini Taniwhasaurus Telmasaurus Tylosaurus pembinensis Tylosaurus proriger
†Bainguis	84.9–70.6 mya	Bayan Mandahu Formation, Mongolia	A diploglossan anguimorph lizzard.	Clidastes Ectenosaurus Estesia Globidens alabamaensis Halisaurus arambourgi Mosasaurus beaugei Mosasaurus lemonnieri Mosasaurus missouriensis Platecarpus tympaniticus Prognathodon lutugini Taniwhasaurus Telmasaurus Tylosaurus pembinensis Tylosaurus proriger
†Catactegenys		Brewster County, Aguja Formation, Texas, USA	A large, possibly durophagous, night lizard.	Clidastes Ectenosaurus Estesia Globidens alabamaensis Halisaurus arambourgi Mosasaurus beaugei Mosasaurus lemonnieri Mosasaurus missouriensis Platecarpus tympaniticus Prognathodon lutugini Taniwhasaurus Telmasaurus Tylosaurus pembinensis Tylosaurus proriger
†Carusia			A basal anguimorph lizard closely related to the extant Xenosauridae.	Clidastes Ectenosaurus Estesia Globidens alabamaensis Halisaurus arambourgi Mosasaurus beaugei Mosasaurus lemonnieri Mosasaurus missouriensis Platecarpus tympaniticus Prognathodon lutugini Taniwhasaurus Telmasaurus Tylosaurus pembinensis Tylosaurus proriger
†Cherminotus			A varanoid lizard that resembles Aiolosaurus.	Clidastes Ectenosaurus Estesia Globidens alabamaensis Halisaurus arambourgi Mosasaurus beaugei Mosasaurus lemonnieri Mosasaurus missouriensis Platecarpus tympaniticus Prognathodon lutugini Taniwhasaurus Telmasaurus Tylosaurus pembinensis Tylosaurus proriger
†Clidastes			A relatively small basal mosasaurine marine lizard.	Clidastes Ectenosaurus Estesia Globidens alabamaensis Halisaurus arambourgi Mosasaurus beaugei Mosasaurus lemonnieri Mosasaurus missouriensis Platecarpus tympaniticus Prognathodon lutugini Taniwhasaurus Telmasaurus Tylosaurus pembinensis Tylosaurus proriger
†Ctenomastax		Djadochta Formation, Gobi Desert, Mongolia	An iguanid iguanian lizard.	Clidastes Ectenosaurus Estesia Globidens alabamaensis Halisaurus arambourgi Mosasaurus beaugei Mosasaurus lemonnieri Mosasaurus missouriensis Platecarpus tympaniticus Prognathodon lutugini Taniwhasaurus Telmasaurus Tylosaurus pembinensis Tylosaurus proriger
†Eoxanta		Djadochta Formation, Gobi Desert, Mongolia	A scincomorph lizard.	Clidastes Ectenosaurus Estesia Globidens alabamaensis Halisaurus arambourgi Mosasaurus beaugei Mosasaurus lemonnieri Mosasaurus missouriensis Platecarpus tympaniticus Prognathodon lutugini Taniwhasaurus Telmasaurus Tylosaurus pembinensis Tylosaurus proriger
†Dryadissector: 1. †D. shilleri			A genus of extinct varanoid lizards.	Clidastes Ectenosaurus Estesia Globidens alabamaensis Halisaurus arambourgi Mosasaurus beaugei Mosasaurus lemonnieri Mosasaurus missouriensis Platecarpus tympaniticus Prognathodon lutugini Taniwhasaurus Telmasaurus Tylosaurus pembinensis Tylosaurus proriger
†Ectenosaurus			A genus of plioplatecarpine mosasaurs.	Clidastes Ectenosaurus Estesia Globidens alabamaensis Halisaurus arambourgi Mosasaurus beaugei Mosasaurus lemonnieri Mosasaurus missouriensis Platecarpus tympaniticus Prognathodon lutugini Taniwhasaurus Telmasaurus Tylosaurus pembinensis Tylosaurus proriger
†Eonatator: 1. †E. coellensis 2. †E. sternbergii			A genus of halisaurine mosasaurs.	Clidastes Ectenosaurus Estesia Globidens alabamaensis Halisaurus arambourgi Mosasaurus beaugei Mosasaurus lemonnieri Mosasaurus missouriensis Platecarpus tympaniticus Prognathodon lutugini Taniwhasaurus Telmasaurus Tylosaurus pembinensis Tylosaurus proriger
†Estesia		Gobi Desert, Mongolia	A genus of anguimorph lizards, originally thought to be closely related to monitor lizards.	Clidastes Ectenosaurus Estesia Globidens alabamaensis Halisaurus arambourgi Mosasaurus beaugei Mosasaurus lemonnieri Mosasaurus missouriensis Platecarpus tympaniticus Prognathodon lutugini Taniwhasaurus Telmasaurus Tylosaurus pembinensis Tylosaurus proriger
†Flaviagama		Djadochta Formation, Gobi Desert, Mongolia	A priscagamid iguanian lizard.	Clidastes Ectenosaurus Estesia Globidens alabamaensis Halisaurus arambourgi Mosasaurus beaugei Mosasaurus lemonnieri Mosasaurus missouriensis Platecarpus tympaniticus Prognathodon lutugini Taniwhasaurus Telmasaurus Tylosaurus pembinensis Tylosaurus proriger
†Gilmoreteius		Mongolia	A genus belonging to Polyglyphanodontia, the only major clade of lizards that went extinct during the K-T extinction event.	Clidastes Ectenosaurus Estesia Globidens alabamaensis Halisaurus arambourgi Mosasaurus beaugei Mosasaurus lemonnieri Mosasaurus missouriensis Platecarpus tympaniticus Prognathodon lutugini Taniwhasaurus Telmasaurus Tylosaurus pembinensis Tylosaurus proriger
†Globaura		Djadochta Formation, Gobi Desert, Mongolia	A scincomorph lizard.	Clidastes Ectenosaurus Estesia Globidens alabamaensis Halisaurus arambourgi Mosasaurus beaugei Mosasaurus lemonnieri Mosasaurus missouriensis Platecarpus tympaniticus Prognathodon lutugini Taniwhasaurus Telmasaurus Tylosaurus pembinensis Tylosaurus proriger
†Gobiderma		Djadochta Formation, Gobi Desert, Mongolia	An anguimorph lizard that resembled a Gila monster though it was not necessarily closely related to it.	Clidastes Ectenosaurus Estesia Globidens alabamaensis Halisaurus arambourgi Mosasaurus beaugei Mosasaurus lemonnieri Mosasaurus missouriensis Platecarpus tympaniticus Prognathodon lutugini Taniwhasaurus Telmasaurus Tylosaurus pembinensis Tylosaurus proriger
†Gobinatus		Djadochta Formation, Gobi Desert, Mongolia	A teiid lacertoid lizard.	Clidastes Ectenosaurus Estesia Globidens alabamaensis Halisaurus arambourgi Mosasaurus beaugei Mosasaurus lemonnieri Mosasaurus missouriensis Platecarpus tympaniticus Prognathodon lutugini Taniwhasaurus Telmasaurus Tylosaurus pembinensis Tylosaurus proriger
†Globidens: 1. †G. alabamaensis 2. †G. dakotensis 3. †G. hisaensis 4. †G. schurmanni 5. †G. simplex			A genus of medium-sized mosasaurine mosasaurs. Along with its closest relatives in the tribe Globidensini it had distinctive globular teeth.	Clidastes Ectenosaurus Estesia Globidens alabamaensis Halisaurus arambourgi Mosasaurus beaugei Mosasaurus lemonnieri Mosasaurus missouriensis Platecarpus tympaniticus Prognathodon lutugini Taniwhasaurus Telmasaurus Tylosaurus pembinensis Tylosaurus proriger
†Gobiderma			An anguimorph lizard that resembled the modern Heloderma lizards.	Clidastes Ectenosaurus Estesia Globidens alabamaensis Halisaurus arambourgi Mosasaurus beaugei Mosasaurus lemonnieri Mosasaurus missouriensis Platecarpus tympaniticus Prognathodon lutugini Taniwhasaurus Telmasaurus Tylosaurus pembinensis Tylosaurus proriger
†Halisaurus			A comparatively small mosasaurs. Type genus of the subfamily Halisaurine.	Clidastes Ectenosaurus Estesia Globidens alabamaensis Halisaurus arambourgi Mosasaurus beaugei Mosasaurus lemonnieri Mosasaurus missouriensis Platecarpus tympaniticus Prognathodon lutugini Taniwhasaurus Telmasaurus Tylosaurus pembinensis Tylosaurus proriger
†Herensugea			A madtsoiid snake.	Clidastes Ectenosaurus Estesia Globidens alabamaensis Halisaurus arambourgi Mosasaurus beaugei Mosasaurus lemonnieri Mosasaurus missouriensis Platecarpus tympaniticus Prognathodon lutugini Taniwhasaurus Telmasaurus Tylosaurus pembinensis Tylosaurus proriger
†Hymenosaurus		Djadochta Formation, Gobi Desert, Mongolia	A scincomorph lizard.	Clidastes Ectenosaurus Estesia Globidens alabamaensis Halisaurus arambourgi Mosasaurus beaugei Mosasaurus lemonnieri Mosasaurus missouriensis Platecarpus tympaniticus Prognathodon lutugini Taniwhasaurus Telmasaurus Tylosaurus pembinensis Tylosaurus proriger
†Isodontosaurus		Djadochta Formation, Gobi Desert, Mongolia	An iguanian lizard in the extinct clade Gobiguania.	Clidastes Ectenosaurus Estesia Globidens alabamaensis Halisaurus arambourgi Mosasaurus beaugei Mosasaurus lemonnieri Mosasaurus missouriensis Platecarpus tympaniticus Prognathodon lutugini Taniwhasaurus Telmasaurus Tylosaurus pembinensis Tylosaurus proriger
†Kawasphenodon: 1. †K. expectatus			A sphenodontid rhynchocephalian closely related to the extant tuatara.	Clidastes Ectenosaurus Estesia Globidens alabamaensis Halisaurus arambourgi Mosasaurus beaugei Mosasaurus lemonnieri Mosasaurus missouriensis Platecarpus tympaniticus Prognathodon lutugini Taniwhasaurus Telmasaurus Tylosaurus pembinensis Tylosaurus proriger
†Lamarquesaurus: 1. †L. cabazai		Cerro Tortuga site near Lamarque, Allen Formation, Argentina	A basal neosphenodont rhynchocephalian.	Clidastes Ectenosaurus Estesia Globidens alabamaensis Halisaurus arambourgi Mosasaurus beaugei Mosasaurus lemonnieri Mosasaurus missouriensis Platecarpus tympaniticus Prognathodon lutugini Taniwhasaurus Telmasaurus Tylosaurus pembinensis Tylosaurus proriger
†Latoplatecarpus: 1. †L. nichollsae 2. †L. willistoni		New Zealand, Japan, Antarctica	A large plioplatecarpine mosasaur.	Clidastes Ectenosaurus Estesia Globidens alabamaensis Halisaurus arambourgi Mosasaurus beaugei Mosasaurus lemonnieri Mosasaurus missouriensis Platecarpus tympaniticus Prognathodon lutugini Taniwhasaurus Telmasaurus Tylosaurus pembinensis Tylosaurus proriger
†Menarana: 1. †M. laurasiae			A madtsoiid snake.	Clidastes Ectenosaurus Estesia Globidens alabamaensis Halisaurus arambourgi Mosasaurus beaugei Mosasaurus lemonnieri Mosasaurus missouriensis Platecarpus tympaniticus Prognathodon lutugini Taniwhasaurus Telmasaurus Tylosaurus pembinensis Tylosaurus proriger
†Mimeosaurus			A priscagamid iguanian lizard. Mimeosaurus is unique among iguanians in having premaxilla bones at the tip of the snout that are reduced in size, as well as having two pairs of enlarged canine-like teeth in the maxilla	Clidastes Ectenosaurus Estesia Globidens alabamaensis Halisaurus arambourgi Mosasaurus beaugei Mosasaurus lemonnieri Mosasaurus missouriensis Platecarpus tympaniticus Prognathodon lutugini Taniwhasaurus Telmasaurus Tylosaurus pembinensis Tylosaurus proriger
†Mosasaurus: 1. †M. beaugei 2. †M. conodon 3. †M. lemonnieri 4. †M. missouriensis			A genus of large mosasaurine mosasaurs, contained some of the largest marine reptiles to have ever lived.	Clidastes Ectenosaurus Estesia Globidens alabamaensis Halisaurus arambourgi Mosasaurus beaugei Mosasaurus lemonnieri Mosasaurus missouriensis Platecarpus tympaniticus Prognathodon lutugini Taniwhasaurus Telmasaurus Tylosaurus pembinensis Tylosaurus proriger
†Myrmecodaptria		Djadochta Formation, Gobi Desert, Mongolia	A basal lizard of contested affinities. Might be related to the contemporary Bainguis.	Clidastes Ectenosaurus Estesia Globidens alabamaensis Halisaurus arambourgi Mosasaurus beaugei Mosasaurus lemonnieri Mosasaurus missouriensis Platecarpus tympaniticus Prognathodon lutugini Taniwhasaurus Telmasaurus Tylosaurus pembinensis Tylosaurus proriger
†Odaxosaurus: 1. †O. piger 2. †O. priscus			An anguid anguimorph.	Clidastes Ectenosaurus Estesia Globidens alabamaensis Halisaurus arambourgi Mosasaurus beaugei Mosasaurus lemonnieri Mosasaurus missouriensis Platecarpus tympaniticus Prognathodon lutugini Taniwhasaurus Telmasaurus Tylosaurus pembinensis Tylosaurus proriger
†Ovoo: 1. †O. gurvel			An early varanid.	Clidastes Ectenosaurus Estesia Globidens alabamaensis Halisaurus arambourgi Mosasaurus beaugei Mosasaurus lemonnieri Mosasaurus missouriensis Platecarpus tympaniticus Prognathodon lutugini Taniwhasaurus Telmasaurus Tylosaurus pembinensis Tylosaurus proriger
†Palaeosaniwa: 1. †P. canadensis	Late Cretaceous	North America	Palaeosaniwa is a platynotan anguimorph of uncertain affinities. It was among the largest terrestrial lizards known from the Mesozoic era, roughly comparable to a large monitor lizard in size, only exceeded by Asprosaurus and Chianghsia.	Clidastes Ectenosaurus Estesia Globidens alabamaensis Halisaurus arambourgi Mosasaurus beaugei Mosasaurus lemonnieri Mosasaurus missouriensis Platecarpus tympaniticus Prognathodon lutugini Taniwhasaurus Telmasaurus Tylosaurus pembinensis Tylosaurus proriger
†Paravaranus: 1. †P. angustifrons			A varanoid lizard.	Clidastes Ectenosaurus Estesia Globidens alabamaensis Halisaurus arambourgi Mosasaurus beaugei Mosasaurus lemonnieri Mosasaurus missouriensis Platecarpus tympaniticus Prognathodon lutugini Taniwhasaurus Telmasaurus Tylosaurus pembinensis Tylosaurus proriger
†Parmeosaurus		Djadochta Formation, Gobi Desert, Mongolia	A scincomorph lizard.	Clidastes Ectenosaurus Estesia Globidens alabamaensis Halisaurus arambourgi Mosasaurus beaugei Mosasaurus lemonnieri Mosasaurus missouriensis Platecarpus tympaniticus Prognathodon lutugini Taniwhasaurus Telmasaurus Tylosaurus pembinensis Tylosaurus proriger
†Patagoniophis: 1. †P. parvus			A madtsoiid snake.	Clidastes Ectenosaurus Estesia Globidens alabamaensis Halisaurus arambourgi Mosasaurus beaugei Mosasaurus lemonnieri Mosasaurus missouriensis Platecarpus tympaniticus Prognathodon lutugini Taniwhasaurus Telmasaurus Tylosaurus pembinensis Tylosaurus proriger
†Phrynosomimus		Djadochta Formation, Gobi Desert, Mongolia	A priscagamid iguanian lizard.	Clidastes Ectenosaurus Estesia Globidens alabamaensis Halisaurus arambourgi Mosasaurus beaugei Mosasaurus lemonnieri Mosasaurus missouriensis Platecarpus tympaniticus Prognathodon lutugini Taniwhasaurus Telmasaurus Tylosaurus pembinensis Tylosaurus proriger
†Platecarpus		USA, possibly Belgium and Africa	A genus of plioplatecarpine mosasaurs.	Clidastes Ectenosaurus Estesia Globidens alabamaensis Halisaurus arambourgi Mosasaurus beaugei Mosasaurus lemonnieri Mosasaurus missouriensis Platecarpus tympaniticus Prognathodon lutugini Taniwhasaurus Telmasaurus Tylosaurus pembinensis Tylosaurus proriger
†Pleurodontagama		Bayan Mandahu Formation Gobi Desert, Mongolia	Originally thought to be a priscagamid, it's sub-pleurodont dentition instead of acrodont permanent dentition indicates that it might had been a more basal iguanian, a potential "missing link" between Chamaeleontiformes and Pleurodonta.	Clidastes Ectenosaurus Estesia Globidens alabamaensis Halisaurus arambourgi Mosasaurus beaugei Mosasaurus lemonnieri Mosasaurus missouriensis Platecarpus tympaniticus Prognathodon lutugini Taniwhasaurus Telmasaurus Tylosaurus pembinensis Tylosaurus proriger
†Plioplatecarpus: 1. †P. houzeaui 2. †P. peckensis 3. †P. primaevus			A genus of plioplatecarpine mosasaurs.	Clidastes Ectenosaurus Estesia Globidens alabamaensis Halisaurus arambourgi Mosasaurus beaugei Mosasaurus lemonnieri Mosasaurus missouriensis Platecarpus tympaniticus Prognathodon lutugini Taniwhasaurus Telmasaurus Tylosaurus pembinensis Tylosaurus proriger
†Priscagama		Djadochta Formation, Gobi Desert, Mongolia	A priscagamid iguanian lizard.	Clidastes Ectenosaurus Estesia Globidens alabamaensis Halisaurus arambourgi Mosasaurus beaugei Mosasaurus lemonnieri Mosasaurus missouriensis Platecarpus tympaniticus Prognathodon lutugini Taniwhasaurus Telmasaurus Tylosaurus pembinensis Tylosaurus proriger
†Prognathodon: 1. †P. currii 2. †P. lutugini 3. †P. overtoni			A genus of large mosasaurine mosasaurs.	Clidastes Ectenosaurus Estesia Globidens alabamaensis Halisaurus arambourgi Mosasaurus beaugei Mosasaurus lemonnieri Mosasaurus missouriensis Platecarpus tympaniticus Prognathodon lutugini Taniwhasaurus Telmasaurus Tylosaurus pembinensis Tylosaurus proriger
†Proplatynotia: 1. †P. proplatynotia			An anguimorph lizard closely related to Monstersauria Varanoidea.	Clidastes Ectenosaurus Estesia Globidens alabamaensis Halisaurus arambourgi Mosasaurus beaugei Mosasaurus lemonnieri Mosasaurus missouriensis Platecarpus tympaniticus Prognathodon lutugini Taniwhasaurus Telmasaurus Tylosaurus pembinensis Tylosaurus proriger
†Rionegrophis			A madtsoiid snake.	Clidastes Ectenosaurus Estesia Globidens alabamaensis Halisaurus arambourgi Mosasaurus beaugei Mosasaurus lemonnieri Mosasaurus missouriensis Platecarpus tympaniticus Prognathodon lutugini Taniwhasaurus Telmasaurus Tylosaurus pembinensis Tylosaurus proriger
†Saichangurvel		Djadochta Formation, Gobi Desert, Mongolia	An iguanian lizard in the extinct clade Gobiguania.	Clidastes Ectenosaurus Estesia Globidens alabamaensis Halisaurus arambourgi Mosasaurus beaugei Mosasaurus lemonnieri Mosasaurus missouriensis Platecarpus tympaniticus Prognathodon lutugini Taniwhasaurus Telmasaurus Tylosaurus pembinensis Tylosaurus proriger
†Saniwides			A varanoid lizard.	Clidastes Ectenosaurus Estesia Globidens alabamaensis Halisaurus arambourgi Mosasaurus beaugei Mosasaurus lemonnieri Mosasaurus missouriensis Platecarpus tympaniticus Prognathodon lutugini Taniwhasaurus Telmasaurus Tylosaurus pembinensis Tylosaurus proriger
†Sineoamphisbaena		Djadochta Formation, Gobi Desert, Mongolia	It was originally proposed and argued that Sineoamphisbaenia was the oldest known amphisbaenian; this, however, was challenged and it's now considered to belong of the extinct clade Polyglyphanodontia.	Clidastes Ectenosaurus Estesia Globidens alabamaensis Halisaurus arambourgi Mosasaurus beaugei Mosasaurus lemonnieri Mosasaurus missouriensis Platecarpus tympaniticus Prognathodon lutugini Taniwhasaurus Telmasaurus Tylosaurus pembinensis Tylosaurus proriger
†Slavoia		Djadochta Formation, Gobi Desert, Mongolia	Previously thought to be a scincomorph, it was later placed in a clade containing Lacertoidea+Scincomorpha. A more recent description of the genus, placed it as a stem-group relative of amphisbaenians within Lacertoidea.	Clidastes Ectenosaurus Estesia Globidens alabamaensis Halisaurus arambourgi Mosasaurus beaugei Mosasaurus lemonnieri Mosasaurus missouriensis Platecarpus tympaniticus Prognathodon lutugini Taniwhasaurus Telmasaurus Tylosaurus pembinensis Tylosaurus proriger
†Taniwhasaurus		New Zealand, Japan, Antarctica	A medium-sized tylosaurine mosasaur.	Clidastes Ectenosaurus Estesia Globidens alabamaensis Halisaurus arambourgi Mosasaurus beaugei Mosasaurus lemonnieri Mosasaurus missouriensis Platecarpus tympaniticus Prognathodon lutugini Taniwhasaurus Telmasaurus Tylosaurus pembinensis Tylosaurus proriger
†Temujinia		Djadochta Formation, Gobi Desert, Mongolia	An iguanian lizard in the extinct clade Gobiguania.	Clidastes Ectenosaurus Estesia Globidens alabamaensis Halisaurus arambourgi Mosasaurus beaugei Mosasaurus lemonnieri Mosasaurus missouriensis Platecarpus tympaniticus Prognathodon lutugini Taniwhasaurus Telmasaurus Tylosaurus pembinensis Tylosaurus proriger
†Telmasaurus			A varanoid lizard.	Clidastes Ectenosaurus Estesia Globidens alabamaensis Halisaurus arambourgi Mosasaurus beaugei Mosasaurus lemonnieri Mosasaurus missouriensis Platecarpus tympaniticus Prognathodon lutugini Taniwhasaurus Telmasaurus Tylosaurus pembinensis Tylosaurus proriger
†Tylosaurus: 1. †T. bernardi 2. †T. ivoensis 3. †T. pembinensis 4. †T. proriger 5. †T. saskatchewanensis			A genus of large tylosaurine mosasaurs, contained some of the largest marine reptiles to have ever lived.	Clidastes Ectenosaurus Estesia Globidens alabamaensis Halisaurus arambourgi Mosasaurus beaugei Mosasaurus lemonnieri Mosasaurus missouriensis Platecarpus tympaniticus Prognathodon lutugini Taniwhasaurus Telmasaurus Tylosaurus pembinensis Tylosaurus proriger
†Zapsosaurus		Djadochta Formation, Gobi Desert, Mongolia	An iguanian lizard in the extinct clade Gobiguania.	Clidastes Ectenosaurus Estesia Globidens alabamaensis Halisaurus arambourgi Mosasaurus beaugei Mosasaurus lemonnieri Mosasaurus missouriensis Platecarpus tympaniticus Prognathodon lutugini Taniwhasaurus Telmasaurus Tylosaurus pembinensis Tylosaurus proriger

== Testudines ==
Turtles of the Campanian
Taxa	Presence	Location	Description	Images
†Adocus	Early Cretaceous – Oligocene, 125–28 Mya	North America	A large, freshwater pantryonychian turtle.	Archelon Protostega
†Allopleuron	Early Upper Cretaceous–Oligocene 94.3–28.4 Mya	Germany	Allopleuron is a genus of extinct basal sea turtle, which measured 2-to-2.5-metre long in life. The type species is Allopleuron hofmanni. It is a basal member of the clade Pancheloniidae, closely related to Protosphargis. Similar to Protosphargis, it was characterized by shell reduction.	Archelon Protostega
†Archelon	Campanian, 80.21–74.21 Mya	Pierre Shale, South Dakota, USA	Archelon is a giant marine turtle in the extinct family Protostegidae. It is the largest turtle ever to have been sufficiently documented, with the biggest specimen measuring 4.6 m from head to tail and 2.2–3.2 t in body mass.	Archelon Protostega
†Atlantochelys	83 Mya	New Jersey	An extinct large marine turtle in the family Protostegidae. Though known from single humerus its full size has been extrapolated as being 3 m.	Archelon Protostega
†Basilemys	Campanian-Maastrichtian, ~84–66	Horseshoe Canyon Formation, Oldman Formation and Dinosaur Park Formation, Alberta; Aguja Formation, Texas to Mexico	A large, terrestrial pantryonychian turtle in the family Nanhsiungchelyidae . It is considered to be the largest terrestrial turtle of its time.	Archelon Protostega
†Calcarichelys	Campanian–Maastrichtian	Selma Group, Alabama, USA	Calcarichelys is a small protostegid, with a carapace length of 25.3 cm. It is probably closely related to Chelosphargis, as they share some characteristics. Unlike Chelosphargis, Calcarichelys is characterized by thornlike neural plates.	Archelon Protostega
†Chelosphargis				Archelon Protostega
†Corsochelys	Campanian	Mooreville Chalk Formation (the lower part of the Selma Group), Alabama	Corsochelys halinches is an extinct species of basal dermochelyid sea turtle related to the modern leatherback turtle.	Archelon Protostega
†Ctenochelys	Late Cretaceous, 89–70 Ma	Mooreville Chalk, central Alabama, United States	An extinct genus of stem-cheloniid sea-turtle.	Archelon Protostega
†Desmatochelys				Archelon Protostega
†Leviathanochelys	Campanian	Cal Torrades locality, lower Perles Formation, Spanish Pyrenees	Leviathanochelys is an extinct genus of giant basal sea turtle. Although Leviathanochelys, at an extrapolated body length of 3.74 m, could reach similar proportions as the largest protostegids, it was more closely related to modern cheloniid sea turtles and possibly a sister taxon to the stem-cheloniid Allopleuron hoffmanni.	Archelon Protostega
†Mesodermochelys	Early Campanian – Maastrichtian	Osoushinai Formation, Yezo Group, Hokkaido, Japan	Corsochelys halinches is an extinct species of basal dermochelyid sea turtle related to the modern leatherback turtle.	Archelon Protostega
†Nichollsemys	Late Cretaceous, 84.9–70.6 Mya	Bearpaw Shale Formation, Alberta	Nichollsemys baieri is an extinct species of basal chelonioid sea turtles.	Archelon Protostega
†Pneumatoarthrus				Archelon Protostega
†Protostega	Campanian 83.5 Mya	Smoky Hill Chalk formation, western Kansas; Mooreville Chalk Formation; Rybushka Formation, Saratov Oblast, Russia.	Protostega gigas is a species of giant marine turtle in the extinct family Protostegidae. It is one of the largest turtles to have ever lived.	Archelon Protostega
†Shandongemys	Late Cretaceous, ~85–75 Ma	Wangshi Group, Shandong, China,	A lindholmemydid pantestudinoid turtle.	Archelon Protostega
†Terlinguachelys	Campanian 80 Mya	Aguja Formation, Texas	An extinct marine turtle in the family Protostegidae.	Archelon Protostega
†Toxochelys	Late Cretaceous	Smoky Hill Chalk, western Kansas	Toxochelys is an extinct genus of marine turtle. Toxochelys had carapace about 90 centimeters. Phylogenetic analysis shows that Toxochelys belong to an extinct lineage of turtles transitional between modern sea turtles and other turtles.	Archelon Protostega

== †Plesiosaurs ==
Plesiosaurs of the Campanian
Taxa	Presence	Location	Description	Images
†Albertonectes	73.5 Ma	Bearpaw Formation, Alberta.	Albertonectes is a genus of very large elasmosaurid plesiosaur with an extremely long neck.	Albertonectes Dolichorhynchops Elasmosaurus Styxosaurus Terminonatator
†Dolichorhynchops	Coniacian–Campanian	North America	Dolichorhynchops is an extinct genus of polycotylid plesiosaur.	Albertonectes Dolichorhynchops Elasmosaurus Styxosaurus Terminonatator
†Elasmosaurus	80.5 mya	Pierre Shale, Kansas, USA	Elasmosaurus is a genus of elasmosaurid plesiosaur with a very long neck.	Albertonectes Dolichorhynchops Elasmosaurus Styxosaurus Terminonatator
†Mauisaurus	77 mya	New Zealand	Mauisaurus is a dubious genus of elasmosaurid plesiosaur known from fragmentary remains.	Albertonectes Dolichorhynchops Elasmosaurus Styxosaurus Terminonatator
†Scanisaurus	Campanian, 80.5–75 mya	Sweden; Russia	Scanisaurus is a dubious genus of plesiosaur, most likely an elasmosaurid. It was relatively small and short necked compared to most elasmosaurids, sometimes been described as a "mesodiran" plesiosaur.	Albertonectes Dolichorhynchops Elasmosaurus Styxosaurus Terminonatator
†Styxosaurus	83.5–80.5 mya	Logan County, Kansas	Styxosaurus is a genus of large elasmosaurid plesiosaur.	Albertonectes Dolichorhynchops Elasmosaurus Styxosaurus Terminonatator
†Terminonatator	73.5 Ma	Bearpaw Formation, Saskatchewan, Canada.	Terminonatator is a genus of elasmosaurid plesiosaur.	Albertonectes Dolichorhynchops Elasmosaurus Styxosaurus Terminonatator

== †Choristoderans ==
Choristoderans of the Campanian
Taxa	Presence	Location	Description	Images
†Champsosaurus: 1. †C. albertensis 2. †C. natator 3. †C. lindoei	C. albertensis: Campanian-Maastrichtian C. natator: middle-late Campanian C. lindoei: middle-late Campanian	C. albertensis: Horseshoe Canyon Formation, Alberta C. natator: Dinosaur Park Formation, Alberta C. lindoei: Dinosaur Park Formation, Alberta and Two Medicine Formation, Montana	Champsosaurus is a genus of crocodile-like neochoristodere.	Champsosaurus natator

== Crocodylomorphs ==
Crocodylomorphs of the Campanian
Taxa	Presence	Location	Description	Images
†Acynodon: 1. †Acynodon adriaticus 2. †Acynodon iberoccitanus	Early Campanian – Late Maastrichtian 83.5–66 Ma	Italy	Initially placed within Alligatoridae but has since been reclassified as a more basal globidontan, the oldest and most primitive known to date. Recent studies have since resolved Acynodon as a basal eusuchian crocodylomorph, outside of the Crocodylia crown group, and a close relative to Hylaeochampsa.	Allodaposuchus precedens Brachychampsa montana Deinosuchus hatcheri Deinosuchus riograndensis Deinosuchus rugosus Paralligator gradilifrons
†Aigialosuchus: 1. †Aigialosuchus villandensis	Early Campanian 83.5–80.5 mya	Kristianstad Basin, Sweden	A member of the extinct family Dyrosauridae, Aigialosaurus was a long- and narrow-snouted crocodylomorph. In contrast to modern crocodylians, which typically have long and slender teeth, the teeth of Aigialosuchus were stout and short.	Allodaposuchus precedens Brachychampsa montana Deinosuchus hatcheri Deinosuchus riograndensis Deinosuchus rugosus Paralligator gradilifrons
†Albertochampsa: 1. †Albertochampsa langstoni	76.9–75.8 Ma	Dinosaur Park Formation, Alberta	A basal member of Globidonta, a group of alligatoroids more derived than Deinosuchus or Leidyosuchus that includes living alligators and caimans.	Allodaposuchus precedens Brachychampsa montana Deinosuchus hatcheri Deinosuchus riograndensis Deinosuchus rugosus Paralligator gradilifrons
†Agaresuchus: 1. †Agaresuchus fontisensis	Late Campanian-Maastrichtian	Spain	A genus of average-sized basal eusuchian. Might be synonymous with its contemporary relative genus Allodaposuchus.	Allodaposuchus precedens Brachychampsa montana Deinosuchus hatcheri Deinosuchus riograndensis Deinosuchus rugosus Paralligator gradilifrons
†Allodaposuchus: 1. †Allodaposuchus precedens 2. †Allodaposuchus iberoarmoricanus	84.9–66.043 Ma	Spain and France,	A genus of average-sized basal eusuchian, growing to around 3 m (9.8 ft) long. The main feature that distinguishes this species from other related crocodylomorphs is the orientation of a groove at the back of the skull called the cranioquadrate passage; unlike the cranioquadrate passages of other crocodylomorphs, which are only visible at the back of the skull, the cranioquadrate passage of this variety is visible when the skull is viewed from the side. The genus includes many species but it may be paraphyletic in regards to its contemporary relative genera Agaresuchus and Lohuecosuchus.	Allodaposuchus precedens Brachychampsa montana Deinosuchus hatcheri Deinosuchus riograndensis Deinosuchus rugosus Paralligator gradilifrons
†Artzosuchus: 1. †Artzosuchus brachicephalus	Campanian	Djadochta Formation, Mongolia	Its classification beyond that of a basal crocodylomorph is indeterminant because of the fragmentary nature of the material associated with the genus.	Allodaposuchus precedens Brachychampsa montana Deinosuchus hatcheri Deinosuchus riograndensis Deinosuchus rugosus Paralligator gradilifrons
†Brachychampsa: 1. †Brachychampsa montana 2. †?Brachychampsa sealeyi	early Campanian to Danian	Hell Creek Formation, Montana, USA	A globidontan distinguished by an enlarged fourth maxillary tooth in the upper jaw.	Allodaposuchus precedens Brachychampsa montana Deinosuchus hatcheri Deinosuchus riograndensis Deinosuchus rugosus Paralligator gradilifrons
†Deinosuchus: 1. †Deinosuchus hatcheri 2. †Deinosuchus riograndensis 3. †Deinosuchus rugosus 4. †Deinosuchus schwimmeri	82–73 Ma	USA	A basal alligatoroid and one of the largest crocodylomorphs that ever lived.	Allodaposuchus precedens Brachychampsa montana Deinosuchus hatcheri Deinosuchus riograndensis Deinosuchus rugosus Paralligator gradilifrons
†Denazinosuchus: 1. †D. kirtlandicus	84.9–70.6 Ma	USA	Denazinosuchus is a genus of goniopholidid mesoeucrocodylian.	Allodaposuchus precedens Brachychampsa montana Deinosuchus hatcheri Deinosuchus riograndensis Deinosuchus rugosus Paralligator gradilifrons
†Gobiosuchus: 1. †Gobiosuchus kielanae	Early Campanian 75–71 Ma	Djadokhta Formation, Gobi Desert, Mongolia.	A member of Gobiosuchidae, a family of late surviving but basal non-mesoeucrocodilian crocodyliforms.	Allodaposuchus precedens Brachychampsa montana Deinosuchus hatcheri Deinosuchus riograndensis Deinosuchus rugosus Paralligator gradilifrons
†Leidyosuchus: 1. †Leidyosuchus canadensis	Middle Campanian	Alberta	A basal medium-sized alligatoroid.	Allodaposuchus precedens Brachychampsa montana Deinosuchus hatcheri Deinosuchus riograndensis Deinosuchus rugosus Paralligator gradilifrons
†Lohuecosuchus: 1. †Lohuecosuchus megadontos	Late Campanian-early Maastrichtian	Spain	A genus of average-sized basal eusuchian. Might be synonymous with its contemporary relative genus Allodaposuchus.	Allodaposuchus precedens Brachychampsa montana Deinosuchus hatcheri Deinosuchus riograndensis Deinosuchus rugosus Paralligator gradilifrons
†Paralligator: 1. †Paralligator gradilifrons	Late Cretaceous, ~96–70 Ma	Nemegt Formation, Mongolia	A paralligatorid mesoeucrocodylian.	Allodaposuchus precedens Brachychampsa montana Deinosuchus hatcheri Deinosuchus riograndensis Deinosuchus rugosus Paralligator gradilifrons
†Shamosuchus: 1. †Shamosuchus djadochtaensis	83.6–72.1 mya	Djadochta Formation, Mongolia	A paralligatorid mesoeucrocodylian.	Allodaposuchus precedens Brachychampsa montana Deinosuchus hatcheri Deinosuchus riograndensis Deinosuchus rugosus Paralligator gradilifrons
†Zaraasuchus: 1. †Zaraasuchus shepardi		Zos Canyon, Gobi Desert, Mongolia.	A gobiosuchid.	Allodaposuchus precedens Brachychampsa montana Deinosuchus hatcheri Deinosuchus riograndensis Deinosuchus rugosus Paralligator gradilifrons

== †Pterosaurs ==
Pterosaurs of the Campanian
Taxa	Presence	Location	Description	Images
†Aerotitan	Campanian-Maastrichtian	Allen Formation, Patagonia, Argentina	A genus of moderately large azhdarchid pterosaurs.	Aerotitan Nyctosaurus Pteranodon
†Bogolubovia		Rybushka Formation, Petrovsk, Russia	A genus of moderately of medium to large sized azhdarchid pterosaurs.	Aerotitan Nyctosaurus Pteranodon
†Geosternbergia		USA, North America	Geosternbergia was originally a species of Pteranodon and is famous for its oddly shaped crest.	Aerotitan Nyctosaurus Pteranodon
†Montanazhdarcho		Montana, USA	Small azhdarchoid pterosaur, probably a tapejarid	Aerotitan Nyctosaurus Pteranodon
†Navajodactylus		New Mexico, USA, and Alberta, Canada	Known primarily from forearm elements; tentatively assigned to Azhdarchidae, though most likely not part of it.	Aerotitan Nyctosaurus Pteranodon
†Nyctosaurus		mid-western United States	Nyctosaurus is a genus of pteranodontian pterosaur in the family Nyctosauridae. Nyctosaurids are characterized by their lack of all but the wing finger which may suggest that it spent almost all of its time in the air, rarely walking on the ground.	Aerotitan Nyctosaurus Pteranodon
†Piksi		Montana, USA	Piksi is a genus of pterosaurs containing the single species Piksi barbarulna.	Aerotitan Nyctosaurus Pteranodon
†Pteranodon		Kansas, USA, North America	Pteranodon is a genus of pterosaurs which included some of the largest known flying reptiles, with wingspans over 6 metres	Aerotitan Nyctosaurus Pteranodon
†Volgadraco		Saratov, Russia	A large pterosaur, either an azhdarchoid, a pteranodontid or a nyctosaurid.	Aerotitan Nyctosaurus Pteranodon

== Dinosaurs ==
During the Campanian age, a radiation among dinosaur species occurred. In North America, for example, the number of known dinosaur genera rises from 4 at the base of the Campanian to 48 in the upper part. This development is sometimes referred to as the "Campanian Explosion". However, it is not yet clear if the event is artificial, i.e. the low number of genera in the lower Campanian can be caused by a lower preservation chance for fossils in deposits of that age. The generally warm climates and large continental area covered in shallow sea during the Campanian probably favoured the dinosaurs. In the following Maastrichtian stage, the number of North American dinosaur genera found is 30% less than in the upper Campanian.

=== †Ornithischia ===
==== †Ankylosaurs ====
Ankylosaurs of the Campanian
Taxa	Presence	Location	Description	Images
†Aletopelta		Point Loma Formation, California, USA	A medium-sized ankylosaurid, estimated to be around 6 m (20 ft) long.	Edmontonia Euoplocephalus Pinacosaurus
†Antarctopelta		Santa Marta Formation, James Ross Island, Antarctica	A stocky ankylosaur protected by armor plates embedded in the skin. Although a complete skeleton has not been found, the species is estimated to have reached a maximum length of 4 meters (13 feet). Displays characteristics of both ankylosaurids and nodosaurids.	Edmontonia Euoplocephalus Pinacosaurus
†Edmontonia	Campanian to Maastrichtian	Dinosaur Park Formation, Alberta, Canada	A bulky nodosaurid at roughly 6.6 m (22 ft) long. It had small, ridged bony plates on its back and many sharp spikes along its body sides. The four largest spikes jutted out from the shoulders on each side, two of which were split into subspines in some specimens. Its skull had a pear-like shape when viewed from above.	Edmontonia Euoplocephalus Pinacosaurus
†Euoplocephalus				Edmontonia Euoplocephalus Pinacosaurus
†Heishansaurus			A dubious ankylosaurid, possibly a synonym of Pinacosaurus.	Edmontonia Euoplocephalus Pinacosaurus
†Invictarx	78.5 mya	Menefee Formation, New Mexico, USA	A nodosaurid.	Edmontonia Euoplocephalus Pinacosaurus
†Nodocephalosaurus				Edmontonia Euoplocephalus Pinacosaurus
†Palaeoscincus		Judith River Formation	known from a single tooth	Edmontonia Euoplocephalus Pinacosaurus
†Panoplosaurus		Judith River Formation, Alberta, Canada; Montana, USA	A 5.5–7 m long nodosaurid.	Edmontonia Euoplocephalus Pinacosaurus
†Pinacosaurus				Edmontonia Euoplocephalus Pinacosaurus
†Saichania				Edmontonia Euoplocephalus Pinacosaurus
†Shanxia				Edmontonia Euoplocephalus Pinacosaurus
†Struthiosaurus				Edmontonia Euoplocephalus Pinacosaurus
†Tarchia				Edmontonia Euoplocephalus Pinacosaurus
†Tianzhenosaurus				Edmontonia Euoplocephalus Pinacosaurus
†Zuul	75 mya	Judith River Formation, Montana, USA	An ankylosaurine.	Edmontonia Euoplocephalus Pinacosaurus

==== †Thescelosaurids ====
Parksosaurids of the Campanian
Taxa	Presence	Location	Description	Images
†Albertadromeus	77–76 mya	Oldman Formation Alberta, Canada	A close relative of the contemporary Orodromeus.	Orodromeus
†Koreanosaurus	81 mya	Seonso Conglomerate, Boseong, Korea	Koreanosaurus was likely a burrowing dinosaur. Unlike its orodromine relatives, Koreanosaurus is assumed to have been a quadruped. It reached 2–2.4 meters in body length.	Orodromeus
†Orodromeus	76.7 mya	Two Medicine Formation, Montana, USA	Orodromeus was a small fast bipedal herbivore that probably coexisted with dinosaurs such as Daspletosaurus and Einiosaurus. Its length was estimated by Horner & Weishampel at 2.5 metres.	Orodromeus

==== †Ceratopsians ====
Ceratopsians of the Campanian
Taxa	Presence	Location	Description	Images
†Achelousaurus: 1. Achelousaurus horneri	74.2 million years ago	Glacier County, Two Medicine Formation, Montana, U.S.A.	A highly derived centrosaurine ceratopsid in the tribe Pachyrhinosaurini.	Achelousaurus Agujaceratops Albertaceratops Anchiceratops Avaceratops Bagaceratops Brachyceratops Breviceratops Centrosaurus Cerasinops Chasmosaurus Coahuilaceratops Coronosaurus Diabloceratops Einiosaurus Furcatoceratops Graciliceratops Judiceratops Kosmoceratops Lamaceratops Machairoceratops Medusaceratops Menefeeceratops Mercuriceratops Micropachycephalosaurus Nasutoceratops Pachyrhinosaurus lakustai Pentaceratops Prenoceratops Protoceratops Spinops Styracosaurus Terminocavus Titanoceratops Udanoceratops Utahceratops Vagaceratops Xenoceratops Yehuecauhceratops
†Agujaceratops: 1. †Agujaceratops mariscalensis 2. †Agujaceratops mavericus	77 million years ago	Aguja Formation, Texas	A chasmosaurine ceratopsid.	
†Albertaceratops: 1. †Albertaceratops nesmoi	middle Campanian-age, 77.5 mya	Oldman Formation, Alberta, Canada	Its size has been estimated at 5.8 metres and 3,500 kg, it was a rather large centrosaurine.	
†Anchiceratops: 1. †Anchiceratops ornatus	72–71 mya	Horseshoe Canyon Formation, Alberta	Anchiceratops ornatus was a medium-sized chasmosaurine with a distinctive frill. Fragmentary horn and frill remains from older Campanian formations in Alberta may indicate the existence of a second earlier species.	
†Avaceratops: 1. †Avaceratops lammersi	Late Campanian	Judith River Formation, Montana, USA	A basal centrosaurine ceratopsid. The holotype was small for a ceratopsid but it might had been a juvenile.	
†Bagaceratops: 1. †Bagaceratops rozhdestvenskyi	~72–71 mya	Barun Goyot Formation and Bayan Mandahu Formation, Mongolia	A rather small protoceratopsid.	
†Bainoceratops: 1. †Bainoceratops efremovi	75–71 mya	Djadochta Formation, Mongolia	A small dubious ceratopsian with affinities to Udanoceratops or potentially a juvenile Protoceratops.	
†Brachyceratops: 1. †Brachyceratops montanensis	74.5	Two Medicine Formation, Montana, USA	A dubious centrosaurine known only from partial juvenile specimens.	
†Breviceratops: 1. †Breviceratops kozlowskii	Late Campanian	Barun Goyot Formation, Mongolia	A protoceratopsid known by a partial juvenile postcranial skeleton with skull.	
†Centrosaurus: 1. †Centrosaurus apertus	76.5–75.5 mya	Dinosaur Park Formation, Alberta	A derived centrosaurine.	
†Cerasinops: 1. †Cerasinops hodgskissi		Two Medicine Formation, Montana, USA	A leptoceratopsid.	
†Ceratops: 1. †Ceratops montanus				
†Chasmosaurus: 1. †Chasmosaurus russelli 2. †Chasmosaurus belli				
†Coahuilaceratops: 1. †Coahuilaceratops magnacuerna				
†Coronosaurus: 1. †Coronosaurus brinkmani				
†Diabloceratops: 1. †Diabloceratops eatoni			A basal centrosaurine.	
?†Dysganus: 1. †Dysganus encaustus 2. †Dysganus bicarinatus 3. †Dysganus haydenianus 4. †Dysganus peiganus	79–74.9 mya	All 4 named species are known from the Judith River Formation of Montana, USA	A dubious genus of ceratopsid ceratopsians.	
†Einiosaurus: 1. †Einiosaurus procurvicornis				
†Eoceratops: 1. †Eoceratops canadensis				
†Furcatoceratops: 1. †Furcatoceratops elucidans	~75.9–75.3	Judith River Formation, Montana, USA	A basal centrosaurine known from a nearly complete disarticulated skeleton of a moderately-sized subadult.	
†Graciliceratops: 1. †Graciliceratops mongoliensis				
†Gremlin: 1. †Gremlin slobodorum	77 mya	Oldman Formation, Alberta		
†Gryphoceratops: 1. †Gryphoceratops morrisoni				
†Judiceratops: 1. †Judiceratops tigris				
†Kosmoceratops: 1. †Kosmoceratops richardsoni				
†Lamaceratops: 1. †Lamaceratops tereschenkoi				
†Machairoceratops: 1. †Machairoceratops cronusi	80.8 mya	Aguja Formation, Texas	A basal centrosaurine.	
†Magnirostris: 1. †Magnirostris dodsoni				
†Medusaceratops: 1. †Medusaceratops lokii	Middle Campanian, 77.5 Ma	Judith River Formation, Montana, USA	A centrosaurine originally thought to be a chasmosaurine.	
†Menefeeceratops: 1. †Menefeeceratops sealeyi	83.5–80 mya	Menefee Formation, New Mexico, USA	The oldest recognized centrosaurine ceratopsid.	
†Mercuriceratops: 1. †Mercuriceratops gemini				
†Micropachycephalosaurus: 1. †Micropachycephalosaurus hongtuyanensis				
†Mojoceratops: 1. †Mojoceratops perifania				
†Monoclonius: 1. †Monoclonius crassus				
†Navajoceratops: 1. ††Navajoceratops sullivani	75.0–73.4 mya	Kirtland Formation, New Mexico, USA	Navajoceratops was found to represent a stratigraphic and morphological intermediate between Pentaceratops and Anchiceratops. Navajoceratops was also found to be marginally less derived than Terminocavus.	
†Nasutoceratops: 1. †Nasutoceratops titusi	Late Campanian, about 76.0–75.5 mya	Upper Kaiparowits Formation, Grand Staircase–Escalante National Monument, Utah, United States.	A basal centrosaurine. It had a pair of cattle-like horns above its eyes, the largest ones among Centrosaurinae.	
?†Notoceratops: 1. †Notoceratops bonarellii	Late Cretaceous, ~77–66 mya	Lago Colhué Huapí Formation, Chubut Province, Argentina	A dubious genus of possible ceratopsian affinity	
†Pachyrhinosaurus: 1. †Pachyrhinosaurus canadensis 2. †Pachyrhinosaurus lakustai				
†Pentaceratops: 1. †Pentaceratops sternbergii				
†Platyceratops: 1. †Platyceratops tatarinovi				
†Prenoceratops: 1. †Prenoceratops pieganensis				
†Protoceratops: 1. †Protoceratops andrewsi 2. †Protoceratops hellenikorhinus				
†Spiclypeus: 1. †Spiclypeus shipporum				
†Spinops: 1. †Spinops sternbergorum				
†Styracosaurus: 1. †Styracosaurus albertensis				
†Terminocavus: 1. †Terminocavus sealeyi	75.0–74.6 mya	Kirtland Formation, New Mexico, USA	It was proposed that Terminocavus is a part of a long anagenetic lineage of chasmosaurs. The genera (in sequence) Utahceratops, Pentaceratops, Navajoceratops, Terminocavus, and Anchiceratops would, under this model, represent a single population of organisms changing in form over time, rather than as a diverse assemblage of close relatives.	
†Titanoceratops: 1. †Titanoceratops ouranos	75 mya	Southwestern USA	A very large chasmosaurine, either a synonym and an exceptionally large individual of Pentaceratops sternbergii or a basal triceratopsin.	
†Udanoceratops: 1. †Udanoceratops tschizhovi				
†Unescoceratops: 1. †Unescoceratops koppelhusae				
†Utahceratops: 1. †Utahceratops gettyi				
†Vagaceratops: 1. †Vagaceratops irvinensis				
†Xenoceratops: 1. †Xenoceratops foremostensis	79.5 mya	Foremost Formation, Alberta	A basal centrosaurine.	
†Yehuecauhceratops: 1. †Yehuecauhceratops mudei	72 mya	Coahuila, Aguja Formation, Mexico	A centrosaurine.	

==== †Pachycephalosaurs ====
Pachycephalosaurs of the Campanian
Taxa	Presence	Location	Description	Images
†Colepiocephale	Middle Campanian, 80–77.5 mya	Foremost Formation, Alberta	Colepiocephale lambei is a domed pachycephalosaur characterized by the lack of a lateral and posteriosquamosal shelf, a steeply down-turned parietal, and the presence of two incipient nodes tucked under the posterior margin of the parietosquamosal border.	Colepiocephale lambei Goyocephale Hanssuesia sternbergi Homalocephale Prenocephale Sphaerotholus Stegoceras Tylocephale Wannanosaurus yansiensis
†Foraminacephale	Late Campanian, 75–73 Mya	Dinosaur Park Formation, Belly River Group, Alberta	Foraminacephale was a small to medium-sized pachycephalosaur.	Colepiocephale lambei Goyocephale Hanssuesia sternbergi Homalocephale Prenocephale Sphaerotholus Stegoceras Tylocephale Wannanosaurus yansiensis
†Goyocephale	76 mya	Boro Khovil, Djadochta Formation, Mongolia	Goyocephale is a primitive pachycephalosaurian, and was originally included in the family Homalocephalidae, which united the genus with Homalocephale, which also has a flat skull roof, however, many more recent phylogenetic analyses tend to find Homalocephalidae to be a paraphyletic family, with the genera included simply being consecutive branches sister to Pachycephalosauridae, or as consecutive branches within Pachycephalosauridae. Goyocephale is distinguished from Homalocephale by its overall proportions, the shape of its supratemporal fenestra, and heterodont dentition, although the two share multiple features.	Colepiocephale lambei Goyocephale Hanssuesia sternbergi Homalocephale Prenocephale Sphaerotholus Stegoceras Tylocephale Wannanosaurus yansiensis
†Gravitholus	Late Campanian, 75 mya	Belly River Group, Alberta	There is some debate amongst paleontologists as to whether the animal represents a distinct genus, or if it is synonymous with Stegoceras. Some recent publications indicate it may be a valid genus.	Colepiocephale lambei Goyocephale Hanssuesia sternbergi Homalocephale Prenocephale Sphaerotholus Stegoceras Tylocephale Wannanosaurus yansiensis
†Hanssuesia	Campanian, 77.5–75 mya	Belly River Group, Dinosaur Park Formation and Oldman Formation, Alberta; Judith River Formation, Montana	Distinguished from other pachycephalosaurs by having a depressed parietal region, wide frontoparietal dome, broad nasal characteristics, reduced prefontal lobes, and a reduced parietosquamosal shelf. A possible synonym of Stegoceras.	Colepiocephale lambei Goyocephale Hanssuesia sternbergi Homalocephale Prenocephale Sphaerotholus Stegoceras Tylocephale Wannanosaurus yansiensis
†Homalocephale	Late Cretaceous	Omnogov, Nemegt Formation, Mongolia	Sporting a flat, wedge-shaped skull roof, Homalocephale was different from other pachycephalosaurs.	Colepiocephale lambei Goyocephale Hanssuesia sternbergi Homalocephale Prenocephale Sphaerotholus Stegoceras Tylocephale Wannanosaurus yansiensis
†Ornatotholus	Campanian	Dinosaur Park Formation, Alberta	Likely a synonym of Stegoceras.	Colepiocephale lambei Goyocephale Hanssuesia sternbergi Homalocephale Prenocephale Sphaerotholus Stegoceras Tylocephale Wannanosaurus yansiensis
†Prenocephale	Late Cretaceous	Djadochta Formation, Mongolia	It was similar in many ways to its close relative, Homalocephale but unlike the flattened wedge-shaped skull of later (a possible juvenile trait also potentially seen in early growth stages of Pachycephalosaurus), the head of Prenocephale was rounded and sloping.	Colepiocephale lambei Goyocephale Hanssuesia sternbergi Homalocephale Prenocephale Sphaerotholus Stegoceras Tylocephale Wannanosaurus yansiensis
†Sphaerotholus: 1. †S. goodwini 2. †S. edmontonensis 3. †S. lyonsi	Campanian to Maastrichtian	S. goodwini: Den-na-zin Member of the Kirtland Formation S. edmontonensis: Horseshoe Canyon Formation, Alberta S. lyonsi: Dinosaur Park Formation, Alberta	A highly derived genus of pachycephalosaurs with multiple species.	Colepiocephale lambei Goyocephale Hanssuesia sternbergi Homalocephale Prenocephale Sphaerotholus Stegoceras Tylocephale Wannanosaurus yansiensis
†Stegoceras: 1. †S. validum 2. ?†S. novomexicanum	~77.5–74 mya	S. validum: Dinosaur Park Formation and Oldman Formation, Alberta ?S. novomexicanum: Fruitland Formation and Kirtland Formation, New Mexico	A genus of medium to small sized basal pachycephalosaurid.	Colepiocephale lambei Goyocephale Hanssuesia sternbergi Homalocephale Prenocephale Sphaerotholus Stegoceras Tylocephale Wannanosaurus yansiensis
† Tylocephale	Late Campanian, 75–73 Mya	Barun Goyot Formation, Mongolia	Tylocephale was a medium-sized pachycephalosaur.	Colepiocephale lambei Goyocephale Hanssuesia sternbergi Homalocephale Prenocephale Sphaerotholus Stegoceras Tylocephale Wannanosaurus yansiensis
† Texacephale	77 mya	Aguja Formation, Texas	A medium-sized pachycephalosaur. The cranial dome of Texacephale possessed five to six vertical flanges on each lateral side, connecting it with the postorbital bone.	Colepiocephale lambei Goyocephale Hanssuesia sternbergi Homalocephale Prenocephale Sphaerotholus Stegoceras Tylocephale Wannanosaurus yansiensis
† Wannanosaurus	Latest Campanian - Maastrichtian	Upper member of the Xiaoyan Formation, at the town of Yansi, Shexian County, Anhui Province	A genus of small basal pachycephalosaurian. Despite being one of the smallest non-avian dinosaurs found the fused bones in its skull suggest that it was an adult at death.	Colepiocephale lambei Goyocephale Hanssuesia sternbergi Homalocephale Prenocephale Sphaerotholus Stegoceras Tylocephale Wannanosaurus yansiensis

==== †Ornithopods ====
Ornithopods of the Campanian
Taxa	Presence	Location	Description	Images
Acristavus	79 mya	Two Medicine Formation in Montana and Wahweap Formation in Utah, United States	A genus of brachylophosaurin hadrosaur.	Acristavus gagslarsoni Adelolophus hutchisoni Anasazisaurus horneri Angulomastacator daviesi Aralosaurus tuberiferus Brachylophosaurus Corythosaurus casuarius Edmontosaurus regalis Gasparinisaura Gryposaurus notabilis Hadrosaurus foulkii Hypacrosaurus altispinus Kritosaurus Lambeosaurus lambei Malefica Maiasaura Naashoibitosaurus ostromi Nipponosaurus Ornatops Parasaurolophus walkeri Probrachylophosaurus bergei Prosaurolophus Rhabdodon Saurolophus angustirostris Shantungosaurus Tanius Tsintaosaurus Velafrons
Adelolophus	78 mya	Wahweap Formation, Utah, US	A lambeosaurine, possibly closely related to Parasaurolophus.	
Anasazisaurus	74 mya	Kirtland Formation, New Mexico	A saurolophine. Possibly a member of Kritosaurini.	
Angulomastacator	76.9 mya	Upper Shale of Aguja Formation, Texas	A lambeosaurine.	
Aquilarhinus		Aguja Formation, Texas	Formerly referred to Kritosaurus or as a closely related saurolophine it might be a much more basal hadrosaurid.	
Aralosaurus	Upper Santonian-Lower Campanian boundary 85.8 mya	Bostobe Formation, Kazakhstan	A basal lambeosaurine hadrosaur, Aralosaurus was about the size of an elephant. Although very little is known about Aralosaurus (only one near complete skull has been found); it was identified by a beak with nearly 1,000 small teeth in 30 rows. The back of an Aralosaurus skull was wide, a feature suggestive of large jaw muscles used to power its chewing apparatus.	
Brachylophosaurus	81–76.7 mya	Montana, USA; Alberta, Canada	Brachylophosaurus was a basal saurolophine hadrosaur which reached an adult length of 9 meters (30 feet). Some, depending on their age, had crests that covered nearly the entire skull roof, while others had shorter, narrower crests.	
Corythosaurus	77–75.7 mya	Dinosaur Park Formation, Alberta, Canada	A derived lambeosaurine. C. casuarius reached 8 metres (26 ft) long and 2.8 metric tons (3.1 short tons) in weight and C. intermedius reached 7.7 metres (25 ft) in length and 2.5 metric tons (2.8 short tons) in weight. A "morphologically adult-sized specimen" of C. casuarius measured approximately 9 metres (30 ft) long.	
Diclonius	75 mya	Judith River Formation, Montana, USA	A dubious genus of hadrosaur known only from dental fossils.	
Edmontosaurus	73–66 mya	Horseshoe Canyon Formation, southern Alberta	Edmontosaurus, a saurolophine hadrosaur, included some of the largest ornithischian species, measuring up to 12 metres (39 feet) long and weighing around 4.0 metric tons (4.4 short tons). with a body mass on the order of 4 metric tons (4.4 short tons).	
Gasparinisaura	85 mya	Cinco Saltos, Río Negro Province, Argentina	Gasparinisaura was a small ornithopod of the basal clade Elasmaria. In 2010 Gregory S. Paul estimated the length at 1.7 metres, the weight at thirteen kilogrammes.	
Gilmoreosaurus	72 mya	Mongolia	A relatively large hadrosauromorph.	
Gryposaurus	83–75.5 mya	Alberta, Canada	Gryposaurus was a saurolophine hadrosaur of typical size and shape.	
Hadrosaurus	79.5 mya	New Jersey, USA	One of the most basal hadrosaurids and the namesake genus of the family. It was likely bipedal for the purposes of running, but could use its forelegs to support itself while feeding.	
Hypacrosaurus	75-67 mya	Alberta, Canada	A derived lambeosaurine, Hypacrosaurus is most easily distinguished from other hollow-crested duckbills by its tall neural spines and the form of its crest. The neural spines, which project from the top of the vertebrae, are 5 to 7 times the height of the body of their respective vertebrae in the back,[4] which would have given it a tall back in profile. The skull's hollow crest is like that of Corythosaurus, but is more pointed along its top, not as tall, wider side to side, and has a small bony point at the rear	
Hypsibema		North Carolina and Missouri, USA	A large hadrosauroid known only by a couple of vertebrae.	
Kritosaurus	73 mya	North America	The type specimen of Kritosaurus navajovius is only represented by a partial skull and lower jaws, and associated postcranial remains.	
Lambeosaurus	76-75 mya	Alberta, Canada	A derived lambeosaurine hadrosaur, namesake genus of the subfamily.	
Lophorhothon	80 mya	Alabama, USA	A genus of hadrosauromorphs.	
Malefica		Aguja Formation, Texas	A basal hadrosaur.	
Maiasaura	76.7 mya	Montana, USA	Maiasaura was a large basal saurolophine hadrosaur, attaining an adult length of about 9 metres (30 feet) and had the typical hadrosaurid flat beak and a thick nose. It had a small, spiky crest in front of its eyes. The crest may have been used in headbutting contests between males during the breeding season.	
Matheronodon	Late Campanian, 74–72 mya	Grès à Reptiles Formation, France.	A rhabdodontid.	
Microhadrosaurus		China	A possibly dubious genus of hadrosaur known by a partial lower jaw from a juvenile.	
Mochlodon		Austria	A rhabdodontid.	
Naashoibitosaurus	73 mya	New Mexico, USA	Naashoibitosaurus, a saurolophine hadrosaur, based as it is on a single partial skeleton, is not well known in terms of anatomy. Its skull, the most thoroughly described portion, has a low nasal crest that peaks in front of the eyes, but does not strongly arch as in Gryposaurus.	
Nipponosaurus	80 mya	Sakhalin island	A lambeosaurine hadrosaur known from subadult remains.	
Ornatops	78 mya	New Mexico, USA	A genus of basal saurolophine hadrosaur.	
Parasaurolophus	76.5–73 mya	Alberta, Canada; New Mexico and Utah, USA	A large derived lambeosaurine hadrosaur.	
Probrachylophosaurus	79 mya	Montana, USA; Alberta, Canada	A large basal saurolophine hadrosaur which reached an adult length of over 9 meters (30 feet).	
Prosaurolophus	76-75 mya	Alberta, Canada	Prosaurolophus was a large-headed duckbill; the most complete described specimen has a skull around 0.9 meters (3.0 feet) long on a ~8.5-meter long skeleton (~28 ft).[2] It had a small, stout, triangular crest in front of the eyes; the sides of this crest were concave, forming depressions. The upper arm was relatively short.	
Pteropelyx	75 mya	Montana, USA	A dubious genus of lambeosaurine hadrosaurs. Historically, several species were assigned to it, all based on extremely fragmentary remains, but there is no evidence to support these assignments.	
Rhabdodon	72 mya	France; Spain; Haţeg Island, Romania	It is unclear whether it was an iguanodont or a hypsilophodont, and may be a "missing link" between the two. Current evidence indicates it is an iguanodont similar to Tenontosaurus.	
Saurolophus	69.5–68.5 mya	North America, Asia	Saurolophus is known from material including nearly complete skeletons, giving researchers a clear picture of its bony anatomy. S. osborni, the rarer Albertan species, was around 9.8 meters (32 feet) long, with its skull a meter long (3.3 feet). Its weight is estimated at 1.9 tonnes (2.1 tons). S. angustirostris, the Mongolian species, was larger; the type skeleton is roughly 12 meters (39 feet) long, and larger remains are reported.	
Sektensaurus	~76–72 mya	Lago Colhué Huapí Formation, Golfo San Jorge Basin, Patagonia, Argentina	A genus of ornithopod dinosaur, possibly an elasmarian. Sektensaurus is the first known non-hadrosauroid ornithopod of central Patagonia.	
Shantungosaurus	72 mya	China	A very large saurolophine hadrosaur closely related to Edmontosaurus, it is one of the longest and largest known hadrosaurids and possibly the largest non-sauropod dinosaur; The largest individuals may have weighed as much as 16 tonnes (18 short tons).	
Stephanosaurus	76–75 mya	Dinosaur Park Formation, Alberta	A dubious genus of hadrosaurid dinosaur with a complicated taxonomic history.	
Talenkauen	Campanian-Maastrichtian 76–70 mya	Austral Basin of Santa Cruz, Argentina.	A basal ornithopod in the clade Elasmaria.Talenkauen was rather like Dryosaurus in shape and build, but with a proportionally longer neck. Unlike most of its smaller elasmarian relatives it was a medium-sized ornithopd.	
Tanius	72–71 mya	China	A genus of hadrosauromorph dinosaur.	
Trachodon	77 mya	Montana, USA	Trachodon is a dubious genus of hadrosaurid dinosaur based on teeth. Numerous species had been referred to this genus later reassigned to different genera or proven dubious.	
Trinisaura	Late Campanian 73–72 mya	Snow Hill Island Formation, James Ross Island, Antarctica	Trinisaura is genus of small ornithopods, potentially a member of Elasmaria or a Rhabdodontoidea.	
Tsintaosaurus	72 mya	Southern China	A basal but relatively large lambeosaurine hadrosaur.	
Velafrons	72 mya	Mexico	A large derived lambeosaurine.	

=== †Sauropoda ===
Sauropods of the Campanian
Taxa	Presence	Location	Description	Images
†Aeolosaurus	South America	Lago Colhué Huapi Formation, Argentina	A robust yet moderately sized derived titanosaur. Aelosaurus had a widespread distribution as its remains were found in multiple sites from South America.	Andesaurus Dreadnoughtus Huabeisaurus allocotus Neuquensaurus Saltasaurus, a later close relative of Neuquensaurus and Rocasaurus
†Andesaurus		Neuquén Province, Argentina	Andesaurus is a genus of basal titanosaurian sauropod dinosaur.	Andesaurus Dreadnoughtus Huabeisaurus allocotus Neuquensaurus Saltasaurus, a later close relative of Neuquensaurus and Rocasaurus
†Argyrosaurus		Lago Colhué Huapi Formation, Argentina	A moderately large basal titanosaur. Argyrosaurus is the only titanosaur known to possess carpals.	Andesaurus Dreadnoughtus Huabeisaurus allocotus Neuquensaurus Saltasaurus, a later close relative of Neuquensaurus and Rocasaurus
†Dreadnoughtus		Cerro Fortaleza Formation, Argentina	Dreadnoughtus is one of the largest titanosaurs known.	Andesaurus Dreadnoughtus Huabeisaurus allocotus Neuquensaurus Saltasaurus, a later close relative of Neuquensaurus and Rocasaurus
†Gondwanatitan		Adamantina Formation and Cambabe Formation, Brazil	A fairly small titanosaur, only 7 meters long, a close relative of Aeolosaurus.	Andesaurus Dreadnoughtus Huabeisaurus allocotus Neuquensaurus Saltasaurus, a later close relative of Neuquensaurus and Rocasaurus
†Huabeisaurus		North East, China	A member of the Euhelopodidae sauropods.	Andesaurus Dreadnoughtus Huabeisaurus allocotus Neuquensaurus Saltasaurus, a later close relative of Neuquensaurus and Rocasaurus
†Laplatasaurus		Allen Formation and Anacleto Formation, both in Argentina; Palacio Formation, Uruguay	A rather large yet elegantly built titanosaur, potentially related to earlier lognkosaurs.	Andesaurus Dreadnoughtus Huabeisaurus allocotus Neuquensaurus Saltasaurus, a later close relative of Neuquensaurus and Rocasaurus
†Microcoelus	Santonian-Campanian	Bajo de la Carpa Formation, Argentina	A dubious genus of small titanosaur, likely a saltasaurid, known from only a single dorsal vertebra.	Andesaurus Dreadnoughtus Huabeisaurus allocotus Neuquensaurus Saltasaurus, a later close relative of Neuquensaurus and Rocasaurus
†Neuquensaurus		Anacleto Formation, Argentina	Small-sized saltasaurid titanosaur very closely related to the Asian genus Saltasaurus.	Andesaurus Dreadnoughtus Huabeisaurus allocotus Neuquensaurus Saltasaurus, a later close relative of Neuquensaurus and Rocasaurus
†Rocasaurus	Campanian-Maastrichtian	Allen Formation, Rio Negro Province, Argentina	As saltasaurid titanosaur closely related to the Asian genus Saltasaurus. At a length of only 8 meters it was one of the smallest known sauropods.	Andesaurus Dreadnoughtus Huabeisaurus allocotus Neuquensaurus Saltasaurus, a later close relative of Neuquensaurus and Rocasaurus

=== Theropoda ===
David J. Varrichio observes that during the late Campanian Alberta and Montana had very similar theropods despite significant differences in the types of herbivorous dinosaur faunas.

Non-avian theropods of the Campanian
Taxa	Presence	Location	Description	Images
†Abelisaurus		Allen Formation?, Anacleto Formation?, Argentina	An abelisaurid ceratosaur that probably reached 7 to 9 meters in length; known from only one partial skull.	Abelisaurus Appalachiosaurus Archaeornithomimus Bambiraptor Carnotaurus Citipati Daspletosaurus Dromaeosaurus Gobivenator Mahakala Oviraptor Pyroraptor Saurornithoides Shuvuuia Struthiomimus altus Teratophoneus Tsaagan Velociraptor
†Appalachiosaurus			A derived tyrannosauroid.	Abelisaurus Appalachiosaurus Archaeornithomimus Bambiraptor Carnotaurus Citipati Daspletosaurus Dromaeosaurus Gobivenator Mahakala Oviraptor Pyroraptor Saurornithoides Shuvuuia Struthiomimus altus Teratophoneus Tsaagan Velociraptor
†Archaeornithomimus			An ornithomimid ornithomimosaur.	Abelisaurus Appalachiosaurus Archaeornithomimus Bambiraptor Carnotaurus Citipati Daspletosaurus Dromaeosaurus Gobivenator Mahakala Oviraptor Pyroraptor Saurornithoides Shuvuuia Struthiomimus altus Teratophoneus Tsaagan Velociraptor
†Bambiraptor			A small dromaeosaurid.	Abelisaurus Appalachiosaurus Archaeornithomimus Bambiraptor Carnotaurus Citipati Daspletosaurus Dromaeosaurus Gobivenator Mahakala Oviraptor Pyroraptor Saurornithoides Shuvuuia Struthiomimus altus Teratophoneus Tsaagan Velociraptor
†Bistahieversor			A large derived tyrannosauroid.	Abelisaurus Appalachiosaurus Archaeornithomimus Bambiraptor Carnotaurus Citipati Daspletosaurus Dromaeosaurus Gobivenator Mahakala Oviraptor Pyroraptor Saurornithoides Shuvuuia Struthiomimus altus Teratophoneus Tsaagan Velociraptor
†Byronosaurus			A troodontid	Abelisaurus Appalachiosaurus Archaeornithomimus Bambiraptor Carnotaurus Citipati Daspletosaurus Dromaeosaurus Gobivenator Mahakala Oviraptor Pyroraptor Saurornithoides Shuvuuia Struthiomimus altus Teratophoneus Tsaagan Velociraptor
†Caenagnathus	Dinosaur Park Formation, Alberta		A caenagnathid oviraptorosaur.	Abelisaurus Appalachiosaurus Archaeornithomimus Bambiraptor Carnotaurus Citipati Daspletosaurus Dromaeosaurus Gobivenator Mahakala Oviraptor Pyroraptor Saurornithoides Shuvuuia Struthiomimus altus Teratophoneus Tsaagan Velociraptor
†Citipati			An oviraptorid oviraptorosaur.	Abelisaurus Appalachiosaurus Archaeornithomimus Bambiraptor Carnotaurus Citipati Daspletosaurus Dromaeosaurus Gobivenator Mahakala Oviraptor Pyroraptor Saurornithoides Shuvuuia Struthiomimus altus Teratophoneus Tsaagan Velociraptor
†Citipes	Dinosaur Park Formation, Alberta		An caenagnathid oviraptorosaur. It was substantially smaller than its contemporaneous relatives Caenagnathus and Chirostenotes.	Abelisaurus Appalachiosaurus Archaeornithomimus Bambiraptor Carnotaurus Citipati Daspletosaurus Dromaeosaurus Gobivenator Mahakala Oviraptor Pyroraptor Saurornithoides Shuvuuia Struthiomimus altus Teratophoneus Tsaagan Velociraptor
†Carnotaurus			A derived abelisaurid ceratosaur that probably reached 7 to 9 meters in length	Abelisaurus Appalachiosaurus Archaeornithomimus Bambiraptor Carnotaurus Citipati Daspletosaurus Dromaeosaurus Gobivenator Mahakala Oviraptor Pyroraptor Saurornithoides Shuvuuia Struthiomimus altus Teratophoneus Tsaagan Velociraptor
†Chirostenotes	Dinosaur Park Formation, Alberta		A caenagnathid oviraptorosaur.	Abelisaurus Appalachiosaurus Archaeornithomimus Bambiraptor Carnotaurus Citipati Daspletosaurus Dromaeosaurus Gobivenator Mahakala Oviraptor Pyroraptor Saurornithoides Shuvuuia Struthiomimus altus Teratophoneus Tsaagan Velociraptor
†Daspletosaurus: 1. †Daspletosaurus torosus 2. †Daspletosaurus wilsoni 3. †Daspletosaurus horneri 4. †Daspletosaurus sp.			A genus of large and robustly built tyrannosaurines.	Abelisaurus Appalachiosaurus Archaeornithomimus Bambiraptor Carnotaurus Citipati Daspletosaurus Dromaeosaurus Gobivenator Mahakala Oviraptor Pyroraptor Saurornithoides Shuvuuia Struthiomimus altus Teratophoneus Tsaagan Velociraptor
†Deinodon		Judith River Formation	A dubious tyrannosaurid known from tooth remains.	Abelisaurus Appalachiosaurus Archaeornithomimus Bambiraptor Carnotaurus Citipati Daspletosaurus Dromaeosaurus Gobivenator Mahakala Oviraptor Pyroraptor Saurornithoides Shuvuuia Struthiomimus altus Teratophoneus Tsaagan Velociraptor
†Dromaeosaurus			A small to medium-sized dromaeosaurid maniraptoran theropod with a sickle-like claw.	Abelisaurus Appalachiosaurus Archaeornithomimus Bambiraptor Carnotaurus Citipati Daspletosaurus Dromaeosaurus Gobivenator Mahakala Oviraptor Pyroraptor Saurornithoides Shuvuuia Struthiomimus altus Teratophoneus Tsaagan Velociraptor
†Dromiceiomimus			An ornithomimid ornithomimosaur.	Abelisaurus Appalachiosaurus Archaeornithomimus Bambiraptor Carnotaurus Citipati Daspletosaurus Dromaeosaurus Gobivenator Mahakala Oviraptor Pyroraptor Saurornithoides Shuvuuia Struthiomimus altus Teratophoneus Tsaagan Velociraptor
†Dryptosaurus			A derived tyrannosaur.	Abelisaurus Appalachiosaurus Archaeornithomimus Bambiraptor Carnotaurus Citipati Daspletosaurus Dromaeosaurus Gobivenator Mahakala Oviraptor Pyroraptor Saurornithoides Shuvuuia Struthiomimus altus Teratophoneus Tsaagan Velociraptor
†Dynamoterror	78 mya	Menefee Formation, New Mexico, USA	A large basal tyrannosaurine.	Abelisaurus Appalachiosaurus Archaeornithomimus Bambiraptor Carnotaurus Citipati Daspletosaurus Dromaeosaurus Gobivenator Mahakala Oviraptor Pyroraptor Saurornithoides Shuvuuia Struthiomimus altus Teratophoneus Tsaagan Velociraptor
†Gobivenator			A troodontid	Abelisaurus Appalachiosaurus Archaeornithomimus Bambiraptor Carnotaurus Citipati Daspletosaurus Dromaeosaurus Gobivenator Mahakala Oviraptor Pyroraptor Saurornithoides Shuvuuia Struthiomimus altus Teratophoneus Tsaagan Velociraptor
†Gorgosaurus			An albertosaurine tyrannosaurid.	Abelisaurus Appalachiosaurus Archaeornithomimus Bambiraptor Carnotaurus Citipati Daspletosaurus Dromaeosaurus Gobivenator Mahakala Oviraptor Pyroraptor Saurornithoides Shuvuuia Struthiomimus altus Teratophoneus Tsaagan Velociraptor
†Harpymimus			A basal ornithomimosaur.	Abelisaurus Appalachiosaurus Archaeornithomimus Bambiraptor Carnotaurus Citipati Daspletosaurus Dromaeosaurus Gobivenator Mahakala Oviraptor Pyroraptor Saurornithoides Shuvuuia Struthiomimus altus Teratophoneus Tsaagan Velociraptor
†Khaan			An oviraptorid oviraptorosaur.	Abelisaurus Appalachiosaurus Archaeornithomimus Bambiraptor Carnotaurus Citipati Daspletosaurus Dromaeosaurus Gobivenator Mahakala Oviraptor Pyroraptor Saurornithoides Shuvuuia Struthiomimus altus Teratophoneus Tsaagan Velociraptor
†Kol			An alvarezsaurid.	Abelisaurus Appalachiosaurus Archaeornithomimus Bambiraptor Carnotaurus Citipati Daspletosaurus Dromaeosaurus Gobivenator Mahakala Oviraptor Pyroraptor Saurornithoides Shuvuuia Struthiomimus altus Teratophoneus Tsaagan Velociraptor
†Labocania			A large robust theropod of uncertain affinities, possibly a tyrannosaur.	Abelisaurus Appalachiosaurus Archaeornithomimus Bambiraptor Carnotaurus Citipati Daspletosaurus Dromaeosaurus Gobivenator Mahakala Oviraptor Pyroraptor Saurornithoides Shuvuuia Struthiomimus altus Teratophoneus Tsaagan Velociraptor
†Leptorhynchos			A caenagnathid oviraptorosaur.	Abelisaurus Appalachiosaurus Archaeornithomimus Bambiraptor Carnotaurus Citipati Daspletosaurus Dromaeosaurus Gobivenator Mahakala Oviraptor Pyroraptor Saurornithoides Shuvuuia Struthiomimus altus Teratophoneus Tsaagan Velociraptor
†Linheraptor			A dromaeosaurid.	Abelisaurus Appalachiosaurus Archaeornithomimus Bambiraptor Carnotaurus Citipati Daspletosaurus Dromaeosaurus Gobivenator Mahakala Oviraptor Pyroraptor Saurornithoides Shuvuuia Struthiomimus altus Teratophoneus Tsaagan Velociraptor
†Lythronax		Wahweap Formation, Utah	A 7-meter tyrannosaurine known from a partially complete skull, some vertebrae and a complete pubis	Abelisaurus Appalachiosaurus Archaeornithomimus Bambiraptor Carnotaurus Citipati Daspletosaurus Dromaeosaurus Gobivenator Mahakala Oviraptor Pyroraptor Saurornithoides Shuvuuia Struthiomimus altus Teratophoneus Tsaagan Velociraptor
†Luanchuanraptor			A dromaeosaurid.	Abelisaurus Appalachiosaurus Archaeornithomimus Bambiraptor Carnotaurus Citipati Daspletosaurus Dromaeosaurus Gobivenator Mahakala Oviraptor Pyroraptor Saurornithoides Shuvuuia Struthiomimus altus Teratophoneus Tsaagan Velociraptor
†Mahakala			A small halszkaraptorine maniraptoran.	Abelisaurus Appalachiosaurus Archaeornithomimus Bambiraptor Carnotaurus Citipati Daspletosaurus Dromaeosaurus Gobivenator Mahakala Oviraptor Pyroraptor Saurornithoides Shuvuuia Struthiomimus altus Teratophoneus Tsaagan Velociraptor
†Nanshiungosaurus			A relatively large-bodied therizinosaurid.	Abelisaurus Appalachiosaurus Archaeornithomimus Bambiraptor Carnotaurus Citipati Daspletosaurus Dromaeosaurus Gobivenator Mahakala Oviraptor Pyroraptor Saurornithoides Shuvuuia Struthiomimus altus Teratophoneus Tsaagan Velociraptor
†Noasaurus			A small derived ceratosaur.	Abelisaurus Appalachiosaurus Archaeornithomimus Bambiraptor Carnotaurus Citipati Daspletosaurus Dromaeosaurus Gobivenator Mahakala Oviraptor Pyroraptor Saurornithoides Shuvuuia Struthiomimus altus Teratophoneus Tsaagan Velociraptor
†Ornithomimus			An ornithomimid ornithomimosaur.	Abelisaurus Appalachiosaurus Archaeornithomimus Bambiraptor Carnotaurus Citipati Daspletosaurus Dromaeosaurus Gobivenator Mahakala Oviraptor Pyroraptor Saurornithoides Shuvuuia Struthiomimus altus Teratophoneus Tsaagan Velociraptor
†Oviraptor		Mongolia	Oviraptor is an oviraptorid oviraptorosaur in the subfamily Oviraptorinae.	Abelisaurus Appalachiosaurus Archaeornithomimus Bambiraptor Carnotaurus Citipati Daspletosaurus Dromaeosaurus Gobivenator Mahakala Oviraptor Pyroraptor Saurornithoides Shuvuuia Struthiomimus altus Teratophoneus Tsaagan Velociraptor
†Parvicursor			An alvarezsaur.	Abelisaurus Appalachiosaurus Archaeornithomimus Bambiraptor Carnotaurus Citipati Daspletosaurus Dromaeosaurus Gobivenator Mahakala Oviraptor Pyroraptor Saurornithoides Shuvuuia Struthiomimus altus Teratophoneus Tsaagan Velociraptor
†Pyroraptor		Var, France	A small dromaeosaurid.	Abelisaurus Appalachiosaurus Archaeornithomimus Bambiraptor Carnotaurus Citipati Daspletosaurus Dromaeosaurus Gobivenator Mahakala Oviraptor Pyroraptor Saurornithoides Shuvuuia Struthiomimus altus Teratophoneus Tsaagan Velociraptor
†Richardoestesia			A coelurosaur form taxon known only from teeth and lower jaw fragments.	Abelisaurus Appalachiosaurus Archaeornithomimus Bambiraptor Carnotaurus Citipati Daspletosaurus Dromaeosaurus Gobivenator Mahakala Oviraptor Pyroraptor Saurornithoides Shuvuuia Struthiomimus altus Teratophoneus Tsaagan Velociraptor
†Saurornithoides			A troodontid.	Abelisaurus Appalachiosaurus Archaeornithomimus Bambiraptor Carnotaurus Citipati Daspletosaurus Dromaeosaurus Gobivenator Mahakala Oviraptor Pyroraptor Saurornithoides Shuvuuia Struthiomimus altus Teratophoneus Tsaagan Velociraptor
†Saurornitholestes			A dromaeosaurid.	Abelisaurus Appalachiosaurus Archaeornithomimus Bambiraptor Carnotaurus Citipati Daspletosaurus Dromaeosaurus Gobivenator Mahakala Oviraptor Pyroraptor Saurornithoides Shuvuuia Struthiomimus altus Teratophoneus Tsaagan Velociraptor
†Shuvuuia			An alvarezsaur.	Abelisaurus Appalachiosaurus Archaeornithomimus Bambiraptor Carnotaurus Citipati Daspletosaurus Dromaeosaurus Gobivenator Mahakala Oviraptor Pyroraptor Saurornithoides Shuvuuia Struthiomimus altus Teratophoneus Tsaagan Velociraptor
†Struthiomimus			An ornithomimid ornithomimosaur.	Abelisaurus Appalachiosaurus Archaeornithomimus Bambiraptor Carnotaurus Citipati Daspletosaurus Dromaeosaurus Gobivenator Mahakala Oviraptor Pyroraptor Saurornithoides Shuvuuia Struthiomimus altus Teratophoneus Tsaagan Velociraptor
†Teratophoneus			A basal tyrannosaurine.	Abelisaurus Appalachiosaurus Archaeornithomimus Bambiraptor Carnotaurus Citipati Daspletosaurus Dromaeosaurus Gobivenator Mahakala Oviraptor Pyroraptor Saurornithoides Shuvuuia Struthiomimus altus Teratophoneus Tsaagan Velociraptor
†Thanatotheristes			A close relative of Daspletosaurus.	Abelisaurus Appalachiosaurus Archaeornithomimus Bambiraptor Carnotaurus Citipati Daspletosaurus Dromaeosaurus Gobivenator Mahakala Oviraptor Pyroraptor Saurornithoides Shuvuuia Struthiomimus altus Teratophoneus Tsaagan Velociraptor
†Troodon			A troodontid.	Abelisaurus Appalachiosaurus Archaeornithomimus Bambiraptor Carnotaurus Citipati Daspletosaurus Dromaeosaurus Gobivenator Mahakala Oviraptor Pyroraptor Saurornithoides Shuvuuia Struthiomimus altus Teratophoneus Tsaagan Velociraptor
†Tsaagan			A dromaeosaurid.	Abelisaurus Appalachiosaurus Archaeornithomimus Bambiraptor Carnotaurus Citipati Daspletosaurus Dromaeosaurus Gobivenator Mahakala Oviraptor Pyroraptor Saurornithoides Shuvuuia Struthiomimus altus Teratophoneus Tsaagan Velociraptor
†Variraptor		Var, France	A dromaeosaurid.	Abelisaurus Appalachiosaurus Archaeornithomimus Bambiraptor Carnotaurus Citipati Daspletosaurus Dromaeosaurus Gobivenator Mahakala Oviraptor Pyroraptor Saurornithoides Shuvuuia Struthiomimus altus Teratophoneus Tsaagan Velociraptor
†Velociraptor		Mongolia and China	A dromaeosaurid.	Abelisaurus Appalachiosaurus Archaeornithomimus Bambiraptor Carnotaurus Citipati Daspletosaurus Dromaeosaurus Gobivenator Mahakala Oviraptor Pyroraptor Saurornithoides Shuvuuia Struthiomimus altus Teratophoneus Tsaagan Velociraptor
†Zhuchengtyrannus		Wangshi Group, Zhucheng, China	One of the largest tyrannosaurids at between 10 and 12 meters. Known from a lower jaw and maxilla slightly smaller than those of the later Tyrannosaurus.	Abelisaurus Appalachiosaurus Archaeornithomimus Bambiraptor Carnotaurus Citipati Daspletosaurus Dromaeosaurus Gobivenator Mahakala Oviraptor Pyroraptor Saurornithoides Shuvuuia Struthiomimus altus Teratophoneus Tsaagan Velociraptor

==== Avialae ====
Birds of the Campanian
Taxa	Presence	Location	Description	Images
†Alexornis			A genus of enantiornithine birds of uncertain affinities.	Gargantuavis Hesperornis Hollanda Ichthyornis
†Apatornis			A genus of basal ornithuran birds.	Gargantuavis Hesperornis Hollanda Ichthyornis
†Apsaravis			A genus of basal ornithuromorph birds.	Gargantuavis Hesperornis Hollanda Ichthyornis
†Baptornis			A genus of flightless hesperornithiform birds.	Gargantuavis Hesperornis Hollanda Ichthyornis
†Brodavis			A genus of freshwater hesperornithiform birds. Although Hesperornithes probably lost their flight abilities by the end of the Early Cretaceous, minimal pachyostosis in Brodavis suggests the possibility of some volant abilities.	Gargantuavis Hesperornis Hollanda Ichthyornis
†Canadaga			A genus of flightless hesperornithid birds.	Gargantuavis Hesperornis Hollanda Ichthyornis
†Castignovolucris			An enantiornithe of uncertain affinities. It was estimated to have a wingspan of around 127–185 cm and may have been 75 to 110 cm long when fully grown, making it one of the largest known enantiornitheans to date.	Gargantuavis Hesperornis Hollanda Ichthyornis
†Cretaaviculus	~85 mya	Bostobe Formation, Kazakhstan	An extinct genus of birds. The type species, C. sarysuensis, is known only from an isolated, asymmetrical contour feather	Gargantuavis Hesperornis Hollanda Ichthyornis
†Elsornis			Elsornis is a genus of basal enantiornithine birds. It was flightless or nearly so.	Gargantuavis Hesperornis Hollanda Ichthyornis
†Gargantuavis			A genus of large, primitive and potentially flightless avialan.	Gargantuavis Hesperornis Hollanda Ichthyornis
†Gettyia			An avisaurid enantiornithe, previously thought to be a species of the later closely related Maastrichtian genus Avisaurus.	Gargantuavis Hesperornis Hollanda Ichthyornis
†Gobipteryx			A genus of euenantiornithine enantiornithe. It possessed a robust beak which convergently evolved with those of modern birds.	Gargantuavis Hesperornis Hollanda Ichthyornis
†Halimornis			A genus of avisaurid enantiornithe. It lived in a coastal environment.	Gargantuavis Hesperornis Hollanda Ichthyornis
†Hesperornis			A genus of flightless hesperornithid birds.	Gargantuavis Hesperornis Hollanda Ichthyornis
†Hollanda			A genus of small ground birds. It was either an enantiornithe or a basal ornithuromorph.	Gargantuavis Hesperornis Hollanda Ichthyornis
†Ichthyornis			A genus of toothy seabird-like ornithuran.	Gargantuavis Hesperornis Hollanda Ichthyornis
†Intiornis			A genus of avisaurid enantiornithe. Although closely related to some of the largest avisaurids, members of this genus were very small birds.	Gargantuavis Hesperornis Hollanda Ichthyornis
†Maaqwi	Latest Campanian	Northumberland Formation, British Columbia, Canada.	A genus of large marine diving vegaviid bird with an estimated body mass of 1.5 kg.	Gargantuavis Hesperornis Hollanda Ichthyornis
†Mirarce			A genus of avisaurid enantiornithes, closely related to the later genus Avisaurus.	Gargantuavis Hesperornis Hollanda Ichthyornis
†Limenavis			Limenavis is the closest known relative of modern birds.	Gargantuavis Hesperornis Hollanda Ichthyornis
†Neogaeornis wetzeli			A marine bird from Chile. It had the midfeet of a foot-propelled diving bird, but its relationships are enigmatic. The only known species is from the Campanian-Maastrichtian boundary.	Gargantuavis Hesperornis Hollanda Ichthyornis
†Yandangornis			A genus of basal long-tailed avialan. May potentially be a non-avialan genus of theropod.	Gargantuavis Hesperornis Hollanda Ichthyornis

== Mammals ==
Mammals of the Campanian
Taxa	Presence	Location	Description	Images
†Alphadon	Late Cretaceous	North America	A marsupialiform metatherian.	
†Eodelphis			A marsupialiform metatherian.	
†Kamptobaatar		Djadokhta Formation, Mongolia	A multituberculate allotherian.	
†Kennalestes		Bayan Mandahu Formation and Djadokhta Formation, Mongolia	An insectivorous leptictid eutherian.	
†Kryptobaatar			Also known as Gobibaatar or Tugrigbaatar. It's a multituberculate allotherian.	
†Zalambdalestes			Type genus of Zalambdalestidae, a basal clade of Asian eutherians.	

== See also ==
- List of fossil sites (with link directory)
- List of vertebrate fauna of the Maastrichtian stage
