= Priscagama =

Priscagama Temporal range: Late Cretaceous, 84.9–70.6 Ma

Scientific classification
- Domain: Eukaryota
- Kingdom: Animalia
- Phylum: Chordata
- Class: Reptilia
- Order: Squamata
- Suborder: Iguania
- Family: †Priscagamidae
- Genus: †Priscagama; Borsuk-Białynicka and Moody, 1984

Type species
- †Priscagama gobiensis Borsuk-Białynicka and Moody, 1984

Extinct genus of lizards

Priscagama (meaning "earliest Agama" in Latin) is an extinct genus of iguanian lizard from the Late Cretaceous of Mongolia and China. It belongs to an extinct family of iguanians called Priscagamidae (or subfamily Priscagaminae). Several incomplete skulls have been found in the Barun Goyot and Djadochta formations, and were originally referred to the genus Mimeosaurus; the type species Priscagama gobiensis was named in 1984 when it was recognized that these skulls belonged to a distinct species. Priscagama differs from most other priscagamids in having a more elongate, lightly built skull. It is very similar in appearance to another priscagamid called Pleurodontagama, as the two can only be distinguished by the shape of their teeth.
