= Heterodontagama =

Heterodontagama Temporal range: Ypresian, 54 Ma

Scientific classification
- Domain: Eukaryota
- Kingdom: Animalia
- Phylum: Chordata
- Class: Reptilia
- Order: Squamata
- Suborder: Iguania
- Family: †Priscagamidae
- Genus: †Heterodontagama; Rana et al., 2013

Type species
- †Heterodontagama borsukae Rana et al., 2013

Extinct genus of lizards

Heterodontagama is an extinct genus of iguanian lizard from the Early Eocene of India. It belongs to the extinct family Priscagamidae, which is otherwise only known from the Late Cretaceous of Mongolia. The type species Heterodontagama borsukae was named in 2013 from several isolated upper and lower jaws found in an exposure of the Cambay Shale in an open-pit coal mine in Gujarat.

Heterodontagama has a distinctively heterodont dentition. The two pairs of teeth at the front of the lower jaw are enlarged, pointed, and pleurodont, meaning that they grow from the inner surface of the jaw. The four following pairs of teeth are much smaller and acrodont, meaning that they grow from the upper margin of the jaw. Behind them are four pairs of larger, laterally compressed, and triangular acrodont teeth.
