= Edaphodon mirificus =

Scientific classification
- Domain: Eukaryota
- Kingdom: Animalia
- Phylum: Chordata
- Class: Chondrichthyes
- Subclass: Holocephali
- Order: Chimaeriformes
- Family: Callorhinchidae
- Genus: †Edaphodon
- Species: †E. mirificus

Binomial name
- †Edaphodon mirificus Leidy, 1856

Species of cartilaginous fish

Edaphodon mirificus is a species of Edaphodon, which was found by Joseph Leidy (September 9, 1823 – April 30, 1891) in 1856, in Hornerstown, New Jersey.
