= Xiaoyan Formation =

Geologic formation in China

- Stratigraphic range: Campanian–Maastrichtian
- Type: Geological formation
- Unit of: Huangshan Basin
- Sub-units: Lower; Upper members
- Underlies: Qiyunshan Formation

Location
- Region: Asia

The Xiaoyan Formation is a geological formation in Anhui, China whose strata date back to the Late Cretaceous. Dinosaur remains are among the fossils that have been recovered from the formation. It overlies the older Qiyunshan Formation which it forms the Huangshan Basin with, and was deposited between the Campanian and Maastrichtian stages.

== Vertebrate paleofauna ==
- Wannanosaurus yansiensis - "Partial skull roof, mandible, fragments of postcranium."

== See also ==
- List of dinosaur-bearing rock formations
