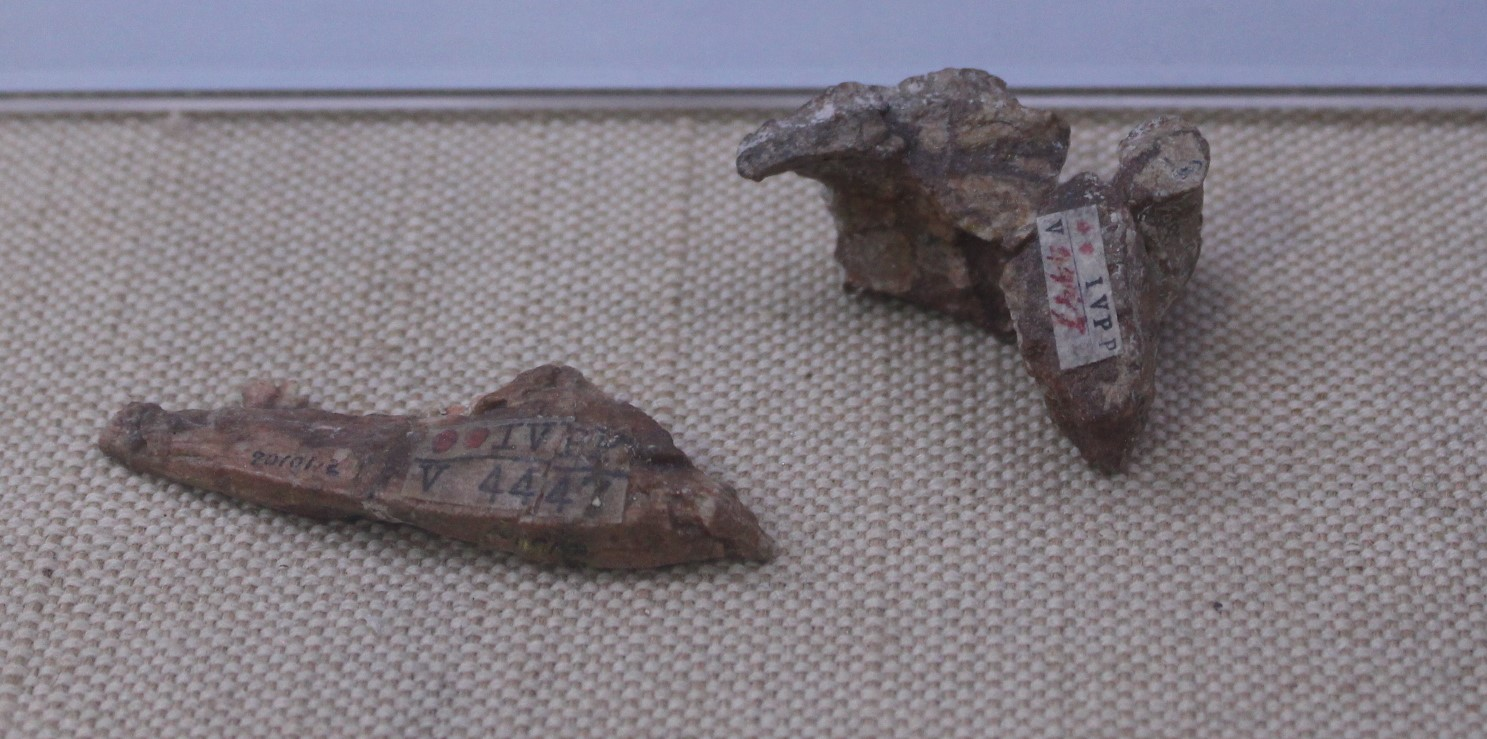
- Holotype skull, Paleozoological Museum of China

Scientific classification
- Kingdom: Animalia
- Phylum: Chordata
- Class: Reptilia
- Clade: Dinosauria
- Clade: †Ornithischia
- Clade: †Cerapoda
- Clade: †Marginocephalia
- Clade: †Pachycephalosauria
- Genus: †Wannanosaurus; Hou, 1977
- Species: †W. yansiensis

Binomial name
- †Wannanosaurus yansiensis Hou, 1977

= Wannanosaurus =

Wannanosaurus Temporal range: Earliest to Middle Maastrichtian, 72.1–69 Ma

Extinct genus of dinosaurs

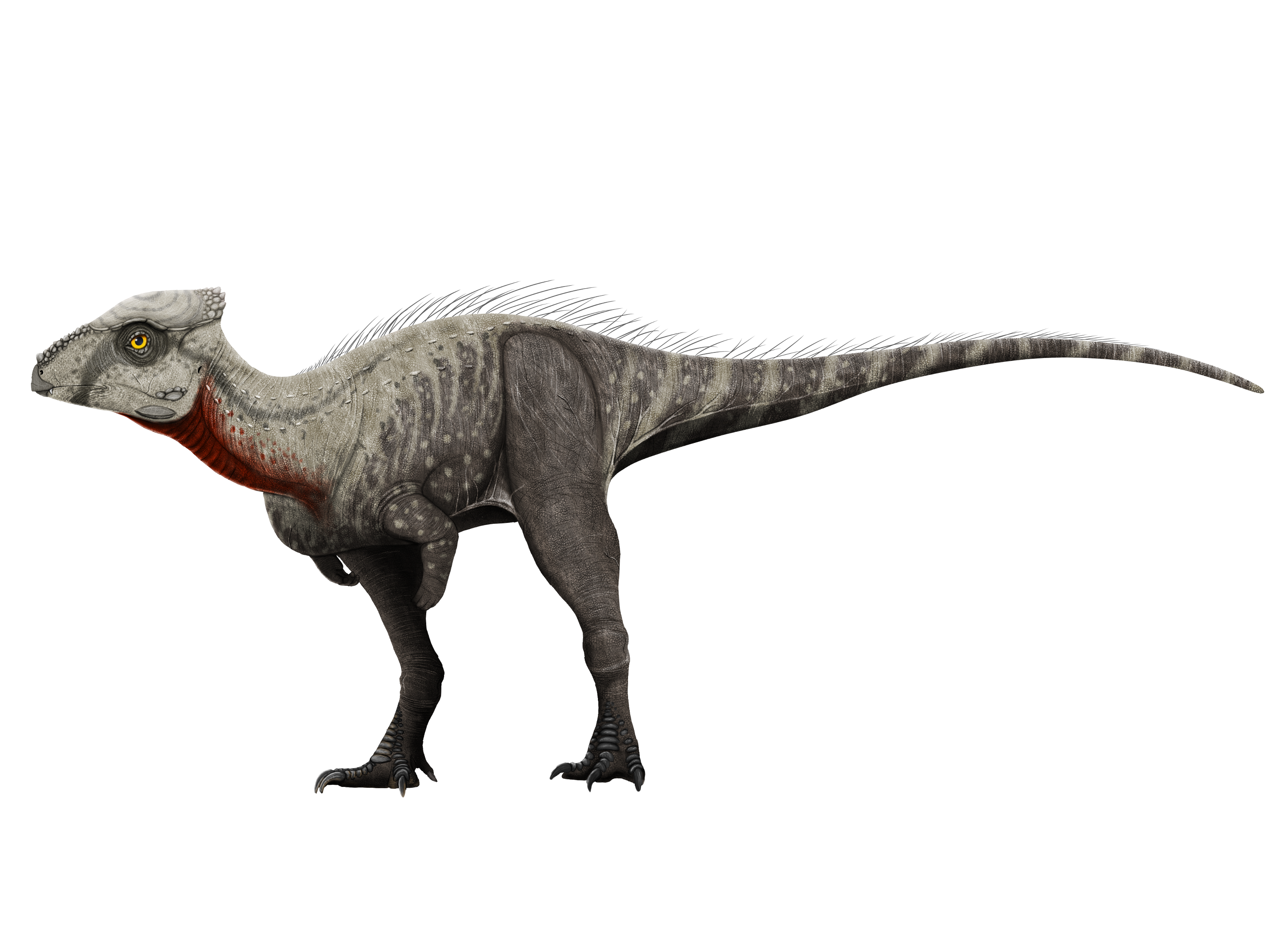
Life reconstruction

Wannanosaurus (meaning "Wannan lizard", named after the location where it was discovered) is a genus of basal pachycephalosaurian dinosaur from the Maastrichtian-aged (Upper Cretaceous) Xiaoyan Formation, about 70 million years ago, in what is now Anhui, China. The type species Wannanosaurus yansiensis was described by Hou Lian-Hai in 1977.

It is known from a single partial skeleton, including a partial skull roof and lower jaw, a femur and tibia, part of a rib, and other fragments. Because it has a flat skull roof with large openings, it has been considered primitive among pachycephalosaurs. Sometimes it has been classified as a member of the now-deprecated family Homalocephalidae, now thought to be an unnatural assembly of pachycephalosaurs without domed skulls. Although its remains are from a very small individual, with a femur length of approximately 8 centimetres (3.1 in) and an estimated overall length of about 60 centimetres (2.0 ft), the fused bones in its skull suggest that it was an adult at death. Like other pachycephalosaurs, it was probably herbivorous or omnivorous, feeding close to the ground on a variety of plant matter, and possibly insects as well.

== See also ==
- Timeline of pachycephalosaur research
