= Phrynosomimus =

Phrynosomimus Temporal range: Santonian-Campanian ~84.9–70.6 Ma

Scientific classification
- Domain: Eukaryota
- Kingdom: Animalia
- Phylum: Chordata
- Class: Reptilia
- Order: Squamata
- Suborder: Iguania
- Family: †Priscagamidae
- Genus: †Phrynosomimus; Alifanov, 1996

Type species
- †Phrynosomimus asper Alifanov, 1996

Extinct genus of lizards

Phrynosomimus is an extinct genus of iguanian lizard from the Late Cretaceous of Mongolia belonging to the extinct family Priscagamidae. The type species Phrynosomimus asper was named in 1996. Fossils have been found in the Barun Goyot and Djadochta formations and include several complete skulls. Phrynosomimus has a short, triangular skull with bony spikes projecting from the back, stemming from the squamosal and parietal bones. These spikes give it a similar appearance to the modern horned lizard Phrynosoma and inspire its name, which means "Phrynosoma mimic." Like other priscagamids it has an acrodont dentition, meaning that its teeth grow from the margins of the jaws rather than their inner surfaces, as is the case for the pleurodont dentitions of most lizards.
