= Priscagamidae =

Priscagamidae Temporal range: Late Cretaceous-Eocene, 83.6–48.6 Ma

Scientific classification
- Kingdom: Animalia
- Phylum: Chordata
- Class: Reptilia
- Order: Squamata
- Suborder: Iguania
- Family: †Priscagamidae; Borsuk-Białynicka and Moody, 1984

Genera
- †Heterodontagama †Mimeosaurus †Phrynosomimus ?†Pleurodontagama †Priscagama

Synonyms
- Priscagaminae Borsuk-Bialynicka and Moody 1984

Extinct family of lizards

Priscagamidae is an extinct family of iguanian lizards known from the Late Cretaceous of Mongolia and China and the Eocene of India, spanning a range from 83.6 to 48.6 million years ago. Probably the earliest priscagamids on indeterminate genera were found in Aptian-Albian sediments in "Hobur", Mongolia. It includes the genera Heterodontagama, Mimeosaurus, Phrynosomimus, Priscagama, and possibly Pleurodontagama. The first fossils of priscagamids were found in the Djadochta and Khermeen Tsav formations of Mongolia. More recently they have been found in the Cambay Formation in India, leading to the naming of Heterodontagama in 2013. Priscagamidae was originally described as a subfamily of Agamidae called Priscagaminae in 1984, but it was reclassified as a distinct family in 1989. Most phylogenetic analyses (analyses of evolutionary relationships) still find a close relationship between Priscagamidae and Agamidae (both have been grouped under a clade called Chamaeleontiformes), although a 2015 study found it to be basal to all other iguanian clades, warranting its removal from Iguania and placement in a larger clade called Iguanomorpha.
