= Edaphodon kawai =

Edaphodon kawai Temporal range: Late Cretaceous

Scientific classification
- Domain: Eukaryota
- Kingdom: Animalia
- Phylum: Chordata
- Class: Chondrichthyes
- Subclass: Holocephali
- Order: Chimaeriformes
- Family: Callorhinchidae
- Genus: †Edaphodon
- Species: †E. kawai

Binomial name
- †Edaphodon kawai Consoli, 2006

Species of cartilaginous fish

Edaphodon kawai was a prehistoric chimaeriform fish species belonging to the genus Edaphodon, of which all the species are now extinct. Edaphodon kawai was a type of rabbitfish, a cartilaginous fish related to sharks and rays, and indeed, some rabbitfishes are still alive today. E. kawai is one of numerous Edaphodon species, but is the only one which has been discovered in the Southern Hemisphere, near New Zealand. Indeed, only a handful of other Chimaeroformes have been discovered in the Southern Hemisphere. They first appeared during the Devonian period around 415 to 360 million years ago, but the only known specimen of E. kawai has been dated to the Late Cretaceous at the height of the rabbitfish's reign. Its scientific name, kawai, means "fish" in the language of the Moriori, a Pacific tribe who inhabited the islands.

== Description ==
Like most prehistoric cartilaginous fishes, E. kawai is known from a few fragmentary remains, including teeth and a beak. E. kawai provided many new points of knowledge for scientists when it was formally described in 2006. Firstly, the range of the prehistoric Edaphodon species, and indeed all prehistoric rabbitfish, was thought to be restricted to the Northern Hemisphere. However, when the fragmental remains of E. kawai were discovered in the Chatham Islands not far from New Zealand, the rabbitfish range was extended. The E. kawai holotype was discovered in the island's Takatiki Grit formation and was dated back to the Late Cretaceous.

Another point of interest for scientists was the uncharacteristic teeth E. kawai possessed. Unlike the sharks and rays to which they are related, most rabbitfish have a single set of teeth that do not grow back and are used for grinding their food. These teeth, along with the position of the mouth so that it is the underside of the head, allows the rabbitfish to graze on the sea bed much like a herbivore would do on land. However, this is not the case with E. kawai; it had teeth which were equipped for both grinding and cutting. This opened up a range of new prey to the fish, which would have been able to scavenge food and rip flesh from decaying carcasses, unlike others in its group, which would only have been able to crush organic matter. E. kawai lived during the Late Cretaceous. During this time, the rabbitfish reached their maximum in diversity.

However, some have argued that the remains of E. kawai are actually those of another prehistoric cartilaginous fish, Ischyodus, which lived about the same time and has also been compared to the rabbitfish Chimaera monstrosa.
