= Dactylopogon =

Dactylopogon Temporal range: Late Campanian

Scientific classification
- Domain: Eukaryota
- Kingdom: Animalia
- Phylum: Chordata
- Class: Actinopterygii
- Superorder: Elopomorpha
- Genus: †Dactylopogon von der Marck, 1868
- Species: †D. grandis

Binomial name
- †Dactylopogon grandis von der Marck, 1868

Extinct genus of fishes

Dactylopogon is an extinct genus of prehistoric marine ray-finned fish that lived during the Late Cretaceous. It contains a single species, D. grandis from the Campanian of the Ahlen Formation of Germany. It was previously considered a myctophiform, but more recent studies have found it to be an elopomorph. A second species, D. parvulus from the Cenomanian-aged Sannine Formation in Lebanon has also sometimes been placed in this genus.

== See also ==
- Prehistoric fish
- List of prehistoric bony fish
