= Paralepidosteus =

Paralepidosteus Temporal range: Albian - Campanian

Scientific classification
- Kingdom: Animalia
- Phylum: Chordata
- Class: Actinopterygii
- Clade: Ginglymodi
- Order: †Semionotiformes
- Genus: †Paralepidosteus; Arambourg & Joleaud, 1943

Extinct genus of fishes

Paralepidosteus (from the Greek para "near" and Lepidosteus) is a dubious genus of _ that lived in present-day Niger during the Late Cretaceous period. It was described by French paleontologists Camille Arambourg and Léonce Joleaud in 1943. The genus contains three species, with P. africanus being the type species. This species is known from a lacrimomaxilla (upper jaw bone) and two vertebrae that had been found in the Damergou locality in northern Niger. In contrast, the other two species, P. praecursor and P. cacemensis are known from the Lower Cretaceous of the Democratic Republic of the Congo and Cenomanian of Portugal respectively.

== See also ==
- Prehistoric fish
- List of prehistoric bony fish
