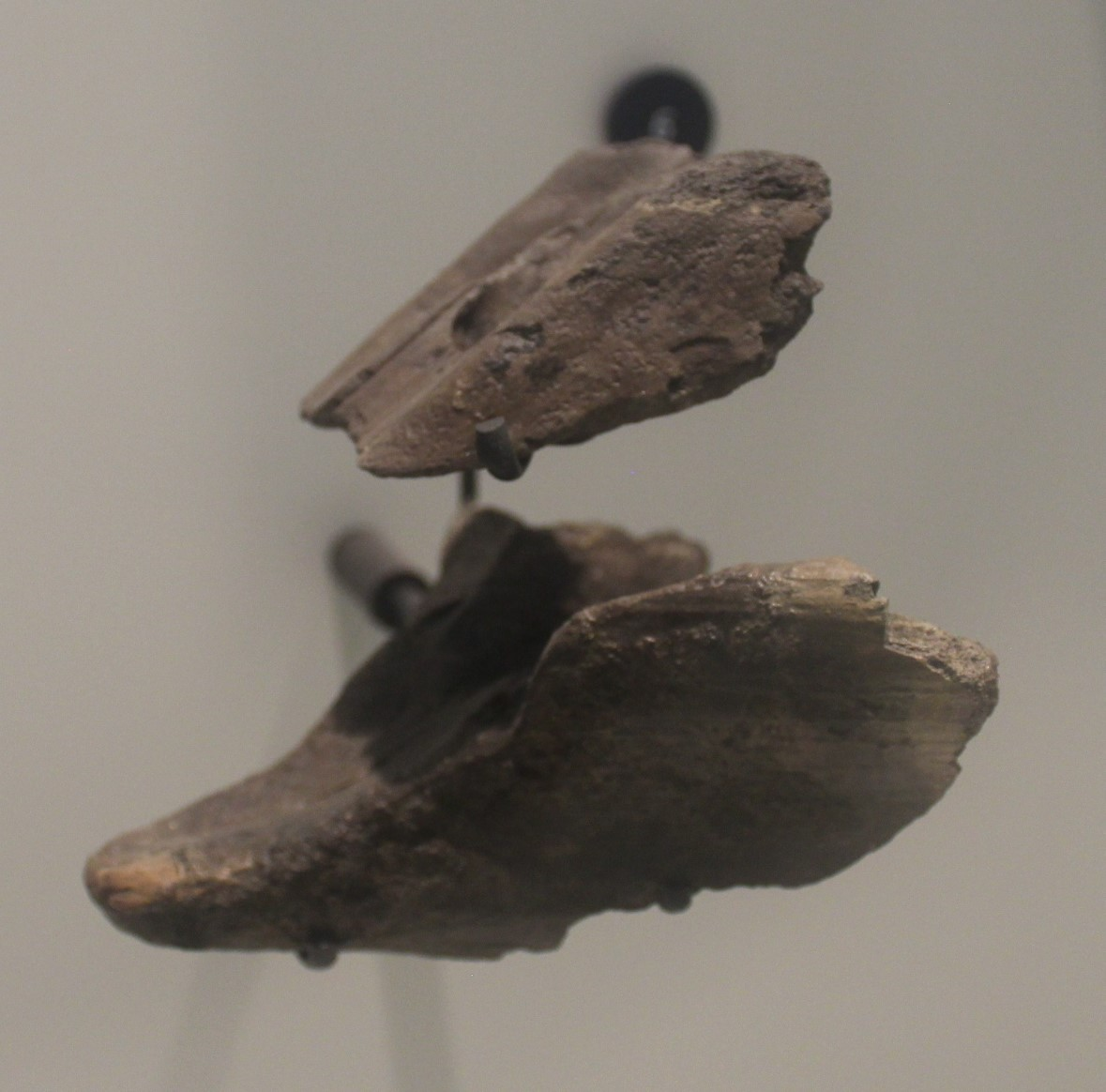
- Tooth plates of E. mirificus, American Museum of Natural History

Scientific classification
- Kingdom: Animalia
- Phylum: Chordata
- Class: Chondrichthyes
- Subclass: Holocephali
- Order: Chimaeriformes
- Family: Callorhinchidae
- Genus: †Edaphodon; Buckland, 1838

Type species
- Edaphodon bucklandii Agassiz, 1843

Species
- See text

= Edaphodon =

Edaphodon Temporal range: Aptian-Pliocene

Extinct genus of cartilaginous fishes

Edaphodon was a fish genus of the family Callorhinchidae (sometimes assigned to Edaphodontidae). As a member of the Chimaeriformes, Edaphodon was a type of rabbitfish, a cartilaginous fish related to sharks and rays. The genus appeared in the Aptian age of the Lower Cretaceous and vanished in the Pliocene. It was most prominent during the Late Cretaceous. Many Edaphodon species were found in the Northern Hemisphere, but species from the Southern Hemisphere are also known (e.g., E. kawai from New Zealand and E. snowhillensis from Antarctica).

== Description ==
Life restoration of E. mirificus

Like most other chimaeriforms, Edaphodon is known mainly from poorly preserved specimens because its skeleton was made of cartilage. So, in most cases, only tooth plates and fin spines have been preserved, and they are also often dissociated. Like other chimaeriforms, it fed using six pairs of tooth plates—one pair on the lower jaw (mandibular) and two pairs on the upper (vomerine and palatine), which bear tooth-like hypermineralized areas known as tritors. The patterning of the tritors is used to distinguish chimaeriforms. In Edaphodon, the vomerine tooth plates are covered in rod-like tritors; each palatine tooth plate is massive, and has one large tritor on the outer edge and two large tritor pads and one small tritor pad in the middle; and each mandibular tooth plate is massive and has a beak-like tritor at the front end, along with two pairs of tritor pads at their outer edges and a single large tritor pad in the middle.

The closest relative of Edaphodon was Ischyodus. They were generally similar, but Ischyodus had four large tritor pads on its palatine tooth plates, as well as thinner mandibular tooth plates with shorter beaks. Edaphodon would have used its tritors for both crushing hard-shelled and slicing other prey such as fishes, sharks, and marine reptiles. In the Upper Cretaceous of Alabama, where I. bifurcatus, E. barberi, and E. mirificus coexisted, the two genera may have had different diets, with Ischyodus feeding on more hard-shelled prey.

Externally, Edaphodon would have been similar to other rabbitfish in appearance. However, at least some species of Edaphodon would have been far larger. The largest mandibular tooth plates of the living Callorhinchus measure 20–50 millimetres (0.79–1.97 in) in length; the largest E. sedgwickii mandibular tooth plates reach 225 millimetres (8.9 in), and E. snowhillensis mandibular tooth plates also reached 180 millimetres (7.1 in). According to living callorhynchid and rhinochimaerid specimens, palatine plate represents 4 percent of the length between gill opening and body tip excluding elongated tail. Based on this calculation, the species E. barberi, E. mirificus, and E. snowhillensis have been estimated at over 3 metres (9.8 ft) in length, with one individual of E. mirificus reaching 3.43 metres (11.3 ft).

== Species ==
Edaphodon has numerous species, all of which are extinct. They include:

- Edaphodon agassizi - Buckland, 1835
- Edaphodon antwerpiensis - Leriche, 1926
- Edaphodon barberi - Applegate, 1970
- Edaphodon bucklandi - Agassiz, 1843 (type species)
- Edaphodon hesperis - Shin, 2010
- Edaphodon kawai - Consoli, 2006
- Edaphodon laqueatus - Leidy, 1873
- Edaphodon latigerus - Cope, 1869
- Edaphodon mantelli Buckland, 1835
- Edaphodon minor Ward, 1973
- Edaphodon mirificus - Leidy, 1856
- Edaphodon snowhillensis - Gouiric-Cavalli et al., 2015
- Edaphodon stenobryus - Cope, 1875
- Edaphodon ubaghsi - Storms in Leriche, 1927

Species of questionable validity include:

- Edaphodon leptognathus - Agassiz, 1843
- Edaphodon sedgwickii - Agassiz, 1843 (possibly synonymous with E. agassizi)
