= Edaphodon hesperis =

Edaphodon hesperis Temporal range: Late Cretaceous

Scientific classification
- Kingdom: Animalia
- Phylum: Chordata
- Class: Chondrichthyes
- Subclass: Holocephali
- Order: Chimaeriformes
- Family: Callorhinchidae
- Genus: †Edaphodon
- Species: †E. hesperis

Binomial name
- †Edaphodon hesperis (Shin, 2010)

Species of cartilaginous fish

Edaphodon hesperis was a prehistoric chimaeriform fish species belonging to the genus Edaphodon, of which all the species are now extinct. Edaphodon hesperis was a type of rabbitfish, a cartilaginous fish related to sharks and rays, and indeed, some rabbitfishes are still alive today.
