= Mimeosaurus =

Mimeosaurus Temporal range: Late Cretaceous, 84.9–70.6 Ma

Scientific classification
- Kingdom: Animalia
- Phylum: Chordata
- Class: Reptilia
- Order: Squamata
- Suborder: Iguania
- Family: †Priscagamidae
- Genus: †Mimeosaurus; Gilmore, 1943

Type species
- †Mimeosaurus crassus Gilmore, 1943

Extinct genus of lizards

Mimeosaurus is an extinct genus of iguanian lizard from the Late Cretaceous of Mongolia. It is part of an extinct family of iguanians called Priscagamidae, and was the first priscagamid to have been described, having been named by American paleontologist Charles W. Gilmore in 1943. Currently only one species, the type species Mimeosaurus crassus, belongs within the genus. A second species, M. tugrikinensis, was named in 1989, but later studies argued that the specimens on which the new name is based are not sufficiently different from M. crassus specimens to warrant being classified as a separate species. Mimeosaurus is unique among iguanians in having premaxilla bones at the tip of the snout that are reduced in size, as well as having two pairs of enlarged canine-like teeth in the maxilla.
