= Pleurodontagama =

Pleurodontagama Temporal range: Late Cretaceous

Scientific classification
- Domain: Eukaryota
- Kingdom: Animalia
- Phylum: Chordata
- Class: Reptilia
- Order: Squamata
- Suborder: Iguania
- Genus: †Pleurodontagama; Borsuk-Białynicka and Moody, 1984

Type species
- †Pleurodontagama aenigmatodes Borsuk-Białynicka and Moody, 1984

Extinct genus of lizards

Pleurodontagama is an extinct genus of iguanian lizard from the Late Cretaceous of Mongolia. The type species, Pleurodontagama aenigmatodes, was named in 1984 on the basis of a mostly complete skull and isolated lower jaw from a fossil locality called Khermeen Tsav. It has a wide skull with a flat snout, large eye sockets, and small bumps on the surfaces of the bones. Pleurodontagama was initially classified in the family Priscagamidae, which is usually grouped in a large clade of iguanians called Acrodonta, members of which are characterized by an "acrodont" dentition in which the teeth grow from the margins of the jaws. However, Pleurodontagama is unusual in that it has a sub-pleurodont dentition, meaning that some of its teeth grow from the inner surfaces of the jaw. There is also evidence to suggest that its teeth may have been continuously replaced throughout life, as opposed to the permanent teeth of acrodontans. Pleurodontagama may have been a transitional form between the derived acrodont type and the pleurodont type inferred for the ancestors of Acrodonta.
