= Paleobiota of the Djadochta Formation =

Geological formation in Mongolia

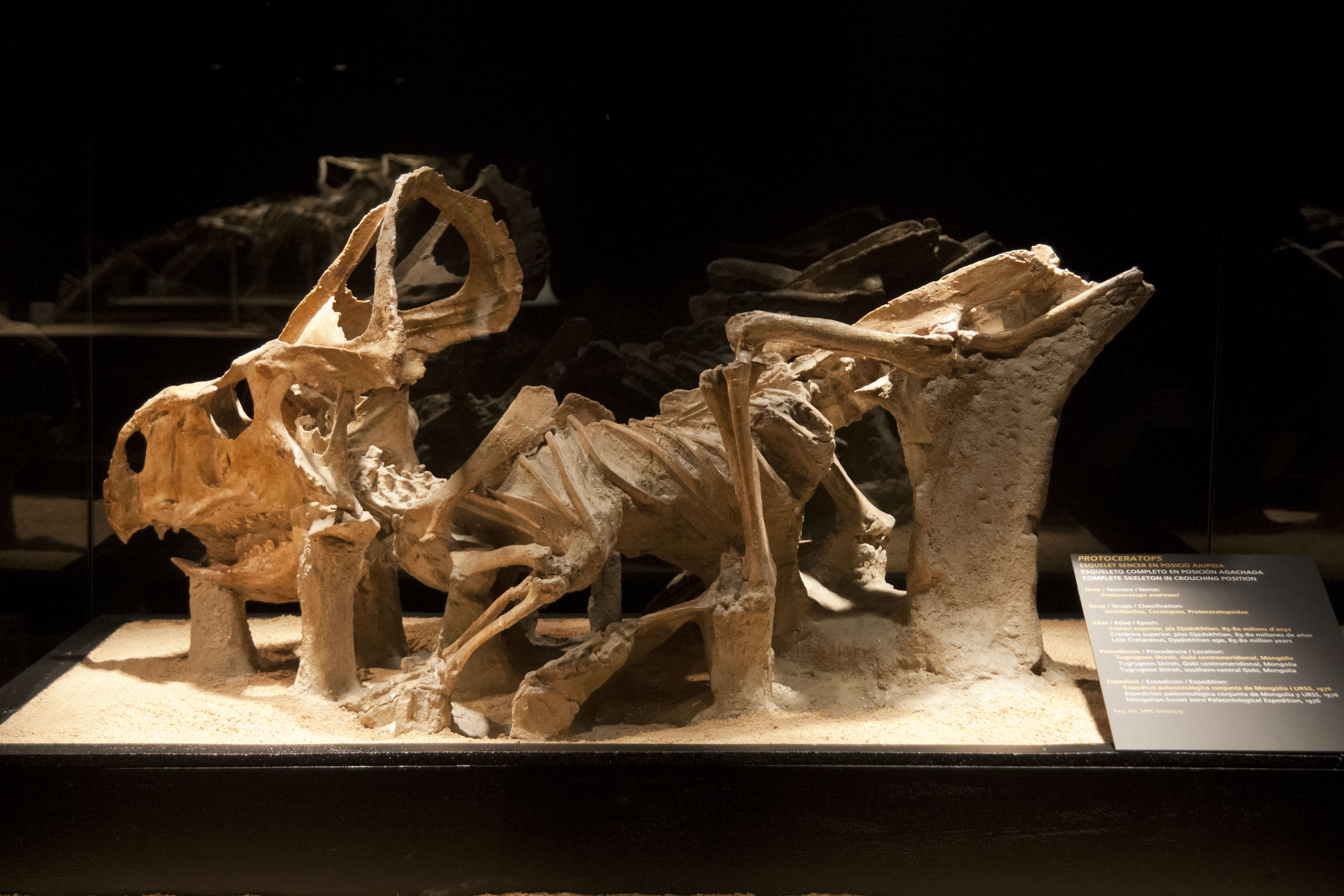
Articulated Protoceratops from Tugriken Shireh. This dinosaur is one of the most common occurrences in the Djadochta Formation

The Djadochta Formation (sometimes spelled Djadokhta, Djadokata, or Dzhadokhtskaya) is a geological formation in the Gobi Desert of Mongolia. It dates to the Campanian stage of the Late Cretaceous and is famous for its dinosaur fossils including Oviraptor, Protoceratops, and Velociraptor. It is also known for a high diversity of mammal and lizard fossils, and a complete catalogue of its fossil contents is shown below.

Color key: Taxon / Reclassified taxon / Taxon falsely reported as present / Dubious taxon or junior synonym / Ichnotaxon / Ootaxon / Morphotaxon

Notes
Uncertain or tentative taxa are in small text
~~crossed out~~ taxa are discredited.

== Vertebrates ==
=== Amphibians ===
Genus	Species	Location	Material	Notes	Images
Gobiates	Indeterminate	Udyn Sayr	"Partial skeleton with partial urostyle."	A frog.	

=== Crocodylomorphs ===
Genus	Species	Location	Material	Notes	Images
Artzosuchus	A. brachicephalus	Udyn Sayr	"Partial skull."	A crocodylomorph.	
Gobiosuchus	G. kielanae	Bayn Dzak	"Multiple specimens with partial skulls and skeletons."	A gobiosuchid.	
Gobiosuchus	G.? parvus	Udyn Sayr	"Partial skull and skeleton."	A gobiosuchid.	
Shamosuchus	S. djadochtaensis	Bayn Dzak, Ukhaa Tolgod	"Two skulls and partial skeleton."	A paralligatorid.	

=== Lizards ===
Genus	Species	Location	Material	Notes	Images
Adamisaurus	A. magnidentatus	Bayn Dzak, Tugriken Shireh, Ukhaa Tolgod	"Skulls and skeletons from multiple specimens."	A teiid. Also present in the Barun Goyot Formation and Bayan Mandahu Formation.	
Aiolosaurus	A. oriens	Ukhaa Tolgod	"Incomplete skull and partial skeleton."	A varanoid.	
Carusia	C. intermedia	Bayn Dzak, Ukhaa Tolgod	"Skulls from multiple specimens."	A carusiid. Also present in the Barun Goyot Formation and Bayan Mandahu Formation.	
Cherminotus	C. longifrons	Tugriken Shireh, Ukhaa Tolgod	"Skulls and partial skeleton."	A varanoid. Also present in the Barun Goyot Formation.	
Ctenomastax	C. parva	Zos	"Incomplete skull."	An iguanid. Also present in the Barun Goyot Formation.	
Dzhadochtosaurus	D. giganteus	Tugriken Shireh	"Partially complete skull."	A macrocephalosaur.	
Eoxanta	E. lacertifrons	Ukhaa Tolgod	"Incomplete skull."	A scincomorph. Also present in the Barun Goyot Formation.	
Estesia	E. mongoliensis	Bayn Dzak, Ukhaa Tolgod	"Partial skulls and teeth."	A monstersaur. Also present in the Barun Goyot Formation.	
Flaviagama	F. dzerzhinskii	Tugriken Shireh	"Skull and two vertebrae."	A priscagamid.	
Globaura	G. venusta	Bayn Dzak, Ukhaa Tolgod	"Partial skulls."	A scincomorph. Also present in the Barun Goyot Formation.	
Gobiderma	G. pulchrum	Udyn Sayr, Ukhaa Tolgod	"Skulls and skin impressions."	A monstersaur. Also present in the Barun Goyot Formation.	
Gobinatus	G. arenosus	Ukhaa Tolgod	"Partial skull."	A teiid. Also present in the Barun Goyot Formation.	
Hymenosaurus	H. clarki	Ukhaa Tolgod	"Partial skull."	A scincomorph.	
Isodontosaurus	I. gracilis	Bayn Dzak, Tugriken Shireh, Ukhaa Tolgod, Zos	"Numerous skulls and a partial skeleton."	An iguanian. Also present in the Bayan Mandahu Formation.	
Macrocephalosaurus	Indeterminate	Ukhaa Tolgod	"Partial skull and skeleton."	A teiid. Also present in the Barun Goyot Formation.	
Mimeosaurus	M. crassus	Bayn Dzak, Ukhaa Tolgod, Zos Wash	"Partially complete skulls."	An acrodont. Also present in the Bayan Mandahu Formation.	
Myrmecodaptria	M. microphagosa	Ukhaa Tolgod	"Single skull."	A gekkotan.	
Ovoo	O. gurval	Little Ukhaa Tolgod	"Partial skull."	A varanid.	
Parmeosaurus	P. scutatus	Ukhaa Tolgod	"Articulated skull and skeleton."	A scincomorph.	
Phrynosomimus	P. asper	Ukhaa Tolgod	"Two partial skulls."	An acrodont. Also present in the Barun Goyot Formation.	
Priscagama	P. gobiensis	Bayn Dzak, Ukhaa Tolgod	"Incomplete skulls."	An priscagamid. Also present in the Barun Goyot Formation.	
Saichangurvel	S. davidsoni	Ukhaa Tolgod	"Complete skull and skeleton in articulation."	An iguanian.	
Slavoia	S. darevskii	Ukhaa Tolgod	"Skulls and skeleton."	A scincomorph. Also present in the Barun Goyot Formation.	
Telmasaurus	T. grangeri	Bayn Dzak	"Partial skull and skeleton."	A varanid.	
Temujinia	T. ellisoni	Tugriken Shireh, Ukhaa Tolgod	"Several partial skulls."	An iguanid.	
Tchingisaurus	T. multivagus	Ukhaa Tolgod	"Partial skull."	A teiid.	
Unnamed scincomorph	Indeterminate	Ukhaa Tolgod	"Partial skull."	A scincomorph.	
Varanoidea indet.	Indeterminate	Ukhaa Tolgod	"Partial maxilla and vertebra."	A varanoid.	
Zapsosaurus	Z. sceliphros	Tugriken Shireh	"Two partial skulls."	An iguanid.	

=== Mammals ===
==== Multituberculates ====
Genus	Species	Location	Material	Notes	Images
Bulganbaatar	B. nemegtbaataroides	Bayn Dzak, Ukhaa Tolgod	"Partial skull, and other remains."	A djadochtatherioid.	
Catopsbaatar	C. catopsaloides	Ukhaa Tolgod	Not specified.	A djadochtatheriid. Also present in the Barun Goyot Formation.	
Chulsanbaatar	C. vulgaris	Ukhaa Tolgod	"Skull and partial skeleton."	A djadochtatherioid. Also present in the Barun Goyot Formation.	
Djadochtatherium	D. matthewi	Bayn Dzak, Tugriken Shireh	"Partial skulls."	A djadochtatheriid.	
Deltatheroides	D. cretacicus	Bayn Dzak	"Partial skull."	A djadochtatheriid.	
Kamptobaatar	K. kuczynskii	Bayn Dzak, Ukhaa Tolgod	"Partial skull, and other remains."	A sloanbaatarid.	
Kryptobaatar	K. dashzevegi	Bayn Dzak, Tugriken Shireh, Ukhaa Tolgod	"Skulls and skeleton remains from several specimens."	A djadochtatheriid. Gobibaatar and Tugrigbaatar are considered synonyms of this taxon.	
Mangasbaatar	M. udanii	Udyn Sayr	"Skulls and partial skeleton from two specimens."	A djadochtatheriid.	
Nemegtbaatar	N. gobiensis	Ukhaa Tolgod	Not specified.	A djadochtatherioid. Also present in the Barun Goyot Formation.	
Sloanbaatar	S. mirabilis	Bayn Dzak, Ukhaa Tolgod	"Complete skull, and other remains."	A sloanbaatarid.	
Tombaatar	T. sabuli	Ukhaa Tolgod	"Partial skull."	A djadochtatheriid.	

==== Therians ====
Genus	Species	Location	Material	Notes	Images
Asiatherium	A. reshetovi	Udyn Sayr	"Articulated skull and skeleton."	A metatherian.	
Deltatheridium	D. pretrituberculare	Bayn Dzak, Ukhaa Tolgod	"Partial skull and skeleton remains."	A metatherian.	
Hyotheridium	H. dobsoni	Bayn Dzak	"Partial skull."	A therian.	
Hyotheridium	Indeterminate	Ukhaa Tolgod	Not specified.	A therian.	
Kennalestes	K. gobiensis	Bayn Dzak, Ukhaa Tolgod	"Nearly complete skull, and other remains."	An eutherian.	
Maelestes	M. gobiensis	Ukhaa Tolgod	"Partial skull with skeleton."	A cimolestid.	
Ukhaatherium	U. nessovi	Ukhaa Tolgod	"Partial to nearly complete skeletons from several specimens."	An eutherian.	
Zalambdalestes	Z. lechei	Bayn Dzak, Tugriken Shireh	"Skulls and skeletons from several specimens."	An eutherian.	

=== Pterosaurs ===
Genus	Species	Location	Material	Notes	Images
Azhdarchidae indet.	Indeterminate	Tugriken Shireh	"Indeterminate bone inside the gut cavity of a Velociraptor."	An azhdarchid.	

=== Turtles ===
Genus	Species	Location	Material	Notes	Images
Nanhsiungchelyidae indet.	Indeterminate	Abdrant Nuru	"Three shell fragments."	A nanhsiungchelyid.	
Nanhsiungchelyidae indet.	Indeterminate	Bayn Dzak	"Partial shells."	A nanhsiungchelyid.	
Nanhsiungchelyidae indet.	Indeterminate	Udyn Sayr	"Two shell fragments."	A nanhsiungchelyid.	
Zangerlia	Z. dzamynchondi	Zamyn Khondt	"Partial shell."	A nanhsiungchelyid.	
Zangerlia	Z. ukhaachelys	Ukhaa Tolgod	"Partial skull and skeleton."	A nanhsiungchelyid.	

=== Dinosaurs ===
==== Ankylosaurids ====
Genus	Species	Location	Material	Notes	Images
Eopinacosaurus	E. cf. mephistocephalus	Tugrikin Shireh	A skull and cervical vertebrae	Remains tentatively referred to E. mephistocephalus, a species previously placed in the genus Pinacosaurus.	
Minotaurasaurus	M. ramachandrani	Ukhaa Tolgod	[Two] complete skulls, mandibles, and first cervical half-ring.	An ankylosaurid previously thought to be a junior synonym of Tarchia, but is now considered to be a valid and distinct taxon.	
Pinacosaurus	P. grangeri	Bayn Dzak, Ukhaa Tolgod	[Three] skulls, mandibles, predentary, cervical vertebrae, dorsal vertebrae, caudal vertebrae, ribs, scapula, coracoids, humerus, radius, ulna, ilium, femora, tibia, fibula, pelvis, manus, tail club handles, cervical half-rings, osteoderms, and a nearly complete skeleton lacking a skull.	An ankylosaurid also known from the Alagteeg Formation and Bayan Mandahu Formation.	
Pinacosaurus	P. hilwitnorum	Bayn Dzak, Ukhaa Tolgod		A basal ankylosaurine ankylosaurid also known from the Bayan Mandahu Formation.	
Ankylosauridae indet.	Indeterminate	Zamyn Khondt	Partially complete postcranial skeleton with in situ osteoderms.	Initially referred to Saichania, but later referred to as Ankylosauridae indet., cf. Pinacosaurus, or cf. Minotaurasaurus	

==== Marginocephalians ====
Genus	Species	Location	Material	Notes	Images
Bainoceratops	B. efremovi	Bayn Dzak	"Partial vertebrae."	A protoceratopsid. May be synonymous with Protoceratops.	
Bagaceratops	Indeterminate	Udyn Sayr	"Skull with partial skeleton."	A protoceratopsid. Indeterminate between Bagaceratops and Protoceratops.	
Goyocephale	G. lattimorei	Boro Khovil	"Partial skull and skeleton."	A pachycephalosaurid. Locality sediments may belong to this formation.	
Protoceratops	P. andrewsi	Bayn Dzak, Tugriken Shireh, Udyn Sayr, Zamyn Khondt	"Multiple partial to complete specimens."	A protoceratopsid.	
Protoceratops	P. hellenikorhinus	Bor Tolgoi, Udyn Sayr	"Partial cranial remains."	A protoceratopsid.	
Protoceratopsidae indet.	Indeterminate	Ukhaa Tolgod	"Numerous skulls and remains."	A protoceratopsid.	
Udanoceratops	U. tschizhovi	Udyn Sayr	"Skull and fragmented skeleton elements."	A giant leptoceratopsid.	

==== Ornithopods ====
Genus	Species	Location	Material	Notes	Images
Hadrosauroidea indet.	Indeterminate	Tugriken Shireh	"Fragmented remains from juveniles."	A hadrosauroid.	
Plesiohadros	P. djadokhtaensis	Alag Teeg	"Skull and partial body elements."	A hadrosauroid. Actually hails from the Alagteeg Formation.	

==== Sauropods ====
Genus	Species	Location	Material	Notes	Images
cf. Nemegtosaurus	Indeterminate	Not specified.	Not specified.	A sauropod.	

==== Theropods ====
===== Alvarezsaurs =====
Genus	Species	Location	Material	Notes	Images
Alvarezsauridae indet.	Indeterminate	Tugriken Shireh	"Partial skull, braincase, and skeleton elements of two specimens."	An alvarezsaurid also known as the Tugriken Shireh alvarezsaur. Uncertainly referred as Parvicursor sp.	Kol ghuva Shuvuuia deserti
Kol	K. ghuva	Ukhaa Tolgod	"A well-preserved right foot."	A large alvarezsaurid. Its classification has been criticized.	Kol ghuva Shuvuuia deserti
Shuvuuia	S. deserti	Ukhaa Tolgod	"Multiple specimens with skull and skeletons."	An alvarezsaurid.	Kol ghuva Shuvuuia deserti
Undescribed Alvarezsauridae	Indeterminate	Bayn Dzak	"Partial pelvic girdle and hindlimb."	An alvarezsaurid.	Kol ghuva Shuvuuia deserti
Undescribed Alvarezsauridae	Indeterminate	Gilvent Wash	Not given.	An alvarezsaurid.	Kol ghuva Shuvuuia deserti

===== Birds =====
Genus	Species	Location	Material	Notes	Images
Apsaravis	A. ukhaana	Ukhaa Tolgod	"Partial postcranial skeleton."	A basal ornithurine bird.	
Elsornis	E. keni	Tugriken Shireh	"Partial articulated skeleton lacking the skull."	An enantiornithe.	
Gobipteryx	G. minuta	Ukhaa Tolgod	"Partial skull."	An enantiornithine. Also present in the Barun Goyot Formation.	
Protoceratopsidovum	P. fluxuosum	Bayn Dzak	"Partial eggs."	Eggs probably laid by a bird.	
Protoceratopsidovum	P. minimum	Baga Tariach, Tugriken Shireh	"Clutch of four eggs and one pole of egg."	Eggs probably laid by a bird.	
Protoceratopsidovum	P. sincerum	Bayn Dzak, Tugriken Shireh	"Multiple eggs and shells."	Eggs probably laid by a bird.	
Styloolithus	S. sabathi	Bayn Dzak	"Partial to complete eggs."	Eggs probably laid by a bird.	

===== Dromaeosaurs =====
Genus	Species	Location	Material	Notes	Images
Halszkaraptor	H. escuilliei	Ukhaa Tolgod	"Partial skeleton with complete skull."	A halszkaraptorine	
Mahakala	M. omnogovae	Tugriken Shireh	"Fragmented skull and skeleton."	A halszkaraptorine	
Shri	S. rapax	Ukhaa Tolgod?	Nearly complete, articulated skeleton (skull and first four cervical vertebrae lost)	A velociraptorine	
Tsaagan	T. mangas	Ukhaa Tolgod	"Skull and partial skeleton."	A velociraptorine	
Velociraptor	V. mongoliensis	Bayn Dzak, Chimney Buttes, Gilvent Wash, Tugriken Shireh, Udyn Sayr, Ukhaa Tolgod	"Multiple partial to complete specimens."	A velociraptorine	
Undescribed Dromaeosauridae	Indeterminate	Abdrant Nuru	"Claw."		
Undescribed Dromaeosauridae	Indeterminate	Zos Wash	"Frontal region."	Indeterminate dromaeosaurid; differs from Tsaagan	

===== Non-maniraptoran theropods =====
Genus	Species	Location	Material	Notes	Images
Aepyornithomimus	A. tugrikinensis	Tugriken Shireh	"Nearly complete foot."	An ornithomimid.	
Ornithomimosauria indet.	Indeterminate	Ukhaa Tolgod	"Partial braincase, jaw tips, ribs, and vertebral fragments".	An ornithomimid.	
Tyrannosauridae indet.	Indeterminate	Bayn Dzak	Not specified.	A tyrannosaurid.	
Tyrannosauridae indet.	Indeterminate	Khongil	"Supraorbital, vertebra, rib, femur and metatarsals."	A tyrannosaurid.	
Tyrannosauridae indet.	Indeterminate	Not specified.	"Partial right ilium."	A tyrannosaurid.	
Tyrannosauridae indet.	Indeterminate	Not specified.	"Teeth."	A tyrannosaurid.	

===== Oviraptorosaurs =====
Genus	Species	Location	Material	Notes	Images
Citipati	C. osmolskae	Ukhaa Tolgod	"Multiple specimens with partial to nearly complete skeletons, an embryo, eggs and nesting individuals."	An oviraptorid.	
Elongatoolithus	E. frustrabilis				
Elongatoolithus	E. subtitectorius				
Khaan	K. mckennai	Ukhaa Tolgod	"Several specimens with partial to complete skeletons and skulls."	An oviraptorid.	
Macroolithus	M. mutabilis		"Eggs."	Eggs probably laid by an oviraptorid	
Oviraptor	O. philoceratops	Bayn Dzak	"Partial skeleton with skull, associated with a nest and juvenile."	An oviraptorid.	
Oviraptoridae indet.	Indeterminate	Zamyn Khondt	"Nearly complete skeleton with skull."	An oviraptorid also known as the Zamyn Khondt oviraptorid. Uncertainly referred to Citipati.	
Oviraptoridae indet.	Indeterminate	Zamyn Khondt	"Nearly complete skull with atlas and axis."	An oviraptorid.	
Oviraptoridae indet.	Indeterminate	Udyn Sayr	"Assemblage of individuals."	An oviraptorid.	
Oviraptoridae indet.	Indeterminate	Not specified.	"Two skulls with characteristic high crest."	An oviraptorid.	

===== Troodontids =====
Genus	Species	Location	Material	Notes	Images
Almas	A. ukhaa	Ukhaa Tolgod	"Skull with partial skeleton."	A troodontid.	
Archaeornithoides	A. deinosauriscus	Bayn Dzak	"Partial skull."	A troodontid? Uncertain relationships among coelurosaurs.	
Byronosaurus	B. jaffei	Ukhaa Tolgod	"Skull and fragmentary skeleton."	A troodontid.	
Gobivenator	G. mongoliensis	Zamyn Khondt	"Almost complete skeleton."	A troodontid.	
Saurornithoides	S. mongoliensis	Bayn Dzak	"Skull with fragmentary skeleton."	A troodontid.	
Troodontidae indet.	Indeterminate	Ukhaa Tolgod	"Partial skeleton."	A troodontid.	
Troodontidae indet.	Indeterminate	Ukhaa Tolgod	"Juvenile skulls, skeleton, and one nest."	A troodontid. Referred to either Almas, or Byronosaurus.	
Troodontidae indet.	Indeterminate	Ukhaa Tolgod	"Fragmented skull and skeleton remains."	A troodontid. Provisionally referred to Saurornithoides, but now excluded.	
Troodontidae indet.	Indeterminate	Ukhaa Tolgod	"Partial skull and skeletons from two specimens."	A troodontid.	

== Flora ==
Genus	Species	Location	Material	Notes	Images
Radicites	R. gobiensis	Bayn Dzak	"Twenty plant roots."	A tracheophyte, likely conifer.	

== See also ==
- Fighting Dinosaurs
- Flaming Cliffs
- List of Asian dinosaurs
- List of pterosaur-bearing stratigraphic units
- List of stratigraphic units with dinosaur body fossils
- Paleobiota of the Yixian Formation
- Roy Chapman Andrews
