= Gregory M. Erickson =

American paleontologist

- Scientific career
- Fields: Paleobiology
- Institutions: Florida State University

Gregory M. Erickson, Ph.D. in paleobiology at Florida State University.

Erickson has published many papers on the ontogeny and growth patterns of alligators and dinosaurs, especially on the theropod Tyrannosaurus rex. Erickson has also been contributing when naming and describing some dinosaur genera, like Guanlong (2006) and Limusaurus (2009). He is a strong proponent to the idea of a dinosaurian origin of birds.

Erickson has been featured in BBC's program The Truth About Killer Dinosaurs, in which he estimates the bite force of Tyrannosaurus rex. He was also featured in an episode of Science Of Sex Appeal (Discovery Channel), which discuss how dinosaurs reproduced.

Below is a list of taxa that Erickson has contributed to naming:

Year	Taxon	Authors
2026	Camurodon borealis gen. et sp. nov.	Shelley, Eberle, Erickson, & Druckenmiller
2026	Kaniqsiqcosmodon polaris gen. et sp. nov.	Shelley, Eberle, Erickson, & Druckenmiller
2026	Qayaqgruk peregrinus gen. et sp. nov.	Shelley, Eberle, Erickson, & Druckenmiller
2023	Sikuomys mikros gen. et sp. nov.	Eberle, Clemens, Erickson, & Druckenmiller
2019	Unnuakomys hutchisoni gen. et sp. nov.	Eberle, Clemens, McCarthy, Fiorillo, Erickson, & Druckenmiller
2019	Psittacosaurus amitabha sp. nov.	Napoli, Hunt, Erickson, & Norell
2016	Eotrachodon orientalis gen. et sp. nov.	Prieto-Marquez, Erickson, & Ebersole
2014	Aorun zhaoi gen. et sp. nov.	Choiniere, Clark, Forster, Norell, Eberth, Erickson, Chu, & Xu
2010	Beishanlong grandis gen. et sp. nov.	Makovicky, Li, Gao, Lewin, Erickson, & Norell
2010	Fruitadens haagarorum gen. et sp. nov.	Butler, Galton, Porro, Chiappe, Henderson, & Erickson
2009	Limusaurus inextricabilis gen. et sp. nov.	Xu, Clark, Mo, Chorniere, Forster, Erickson, Hone, Sullivan, Eberth, Nesbitt, Zhao, Hernandez, Jia, Han, & Guo
2009	Alioramus altai sp. nov.	Brusatte, Carr, Erickson, Bever, & Norell
2009	Anchiornis huxleyi gen. et sp. nov.	Xu, Zhao, Norell, Sullivan, Hone, Erickson, Wang, Han, & Guo
2006	Guanlong wucaii gen. et sp. nov.	Xu, Clark, Forster, Norell, Erickson, Eberth, Jia, & Zhao
