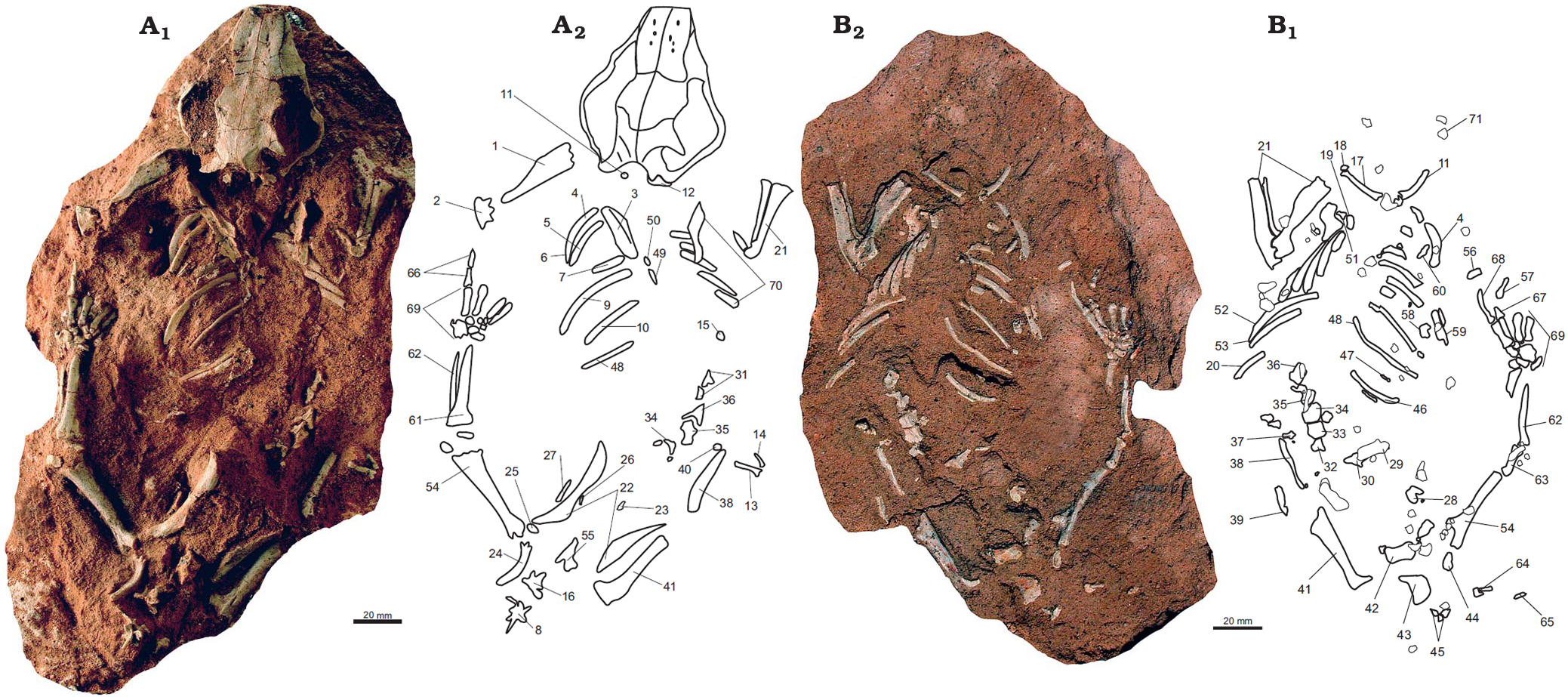
- The most complete skeleton (specimen PM120/107) shown from above (left, A) and below (right, B) as preserved, with diagrams showing individual bones

Scientific classification
- Kingdom: Animalia
- Phylum: Chordata
- Class: Mammalia
- Order: †Multituberculata
- Family: †Djadochtatheriidae
- Genus: †Catopsbaatar; Kielan-Jaworowska, 1994
- Species: †C. catopsaloides

Binomial name
- †Catopsbaatar catopsaloides (Kielan-Jaworowska, 1974)

Synonyms
- Djadochtatherium catopsaloides Kielan-Jaworowska, 1974; Catopsalis catopsaloides Kielan-Jaworowska & Sloan, 1979

= Catopsbaatar =

Catopsbaatar Temporal range: Late Cretaceous, 72 Ma

Extinct species of mammal

Catopsbaatar is a genus of multituberculate, an extinct order of rodent-like mammals. It lived in what is now Mongolia during the late Campanian age of the Late Cretaceous epoch, about 72 million years ago. The first fossils were collected in the early 1970s, and the animal was named as a new species of the genus Djadochtatherium in 1974, D. catopsaloides. The specific name refers to the animal's similarity to the genus Catopsalis. The species was moved to the genus Catopsalis in 1979, and received its own genus (Catopsbaatar, Greek and Mongolian for 'visible hero') in 1994. Five skulls, one molar, and one skeleton with a skull are known; the last is the genus' most complete specimen. Catopsbaatar was a member of the family Djadochtatheriidae.

The skull of Catopsbaatar was up to 70 mm (2.8 in) long and, as in other multituberculates, proportionally large. The external appearance of these animals' heads may have been similar to those of rodents. The skull was heavy-set and wide, with the zygomatic arches strongly expanded to the sides. The eye sockets were smaller and placed further back than in its relatives, and the snout was more elongated. Catopsbaatar had semicircular ridges on the side of the skull, to which the jaw muscles were attached. The mandible was strong and very elongated. It had very robust incisors, and cheek teeth with multiple cusps (for which multituberculates are named). The pelvic bones differed from those of other multituberculates in that they were not fused to each other. Catopsbaatar had spurs on its ankles, like those of the male platypus and echidna, without evidence of a venom canal (present in the former).

The spurs of Catopsbaatar and other Mesozoic mammals may have been used for protection against theropod dinosaurs and other predators. Multituberculates are thought to have given live birth, and the fact that they had hair indicates they were homeothermic ("warmblooded"). Multituberculates would have been omnivorous; Catopsbaatar had powerful jaw muscles, and its incisors were well adapted for gnawing hard seeds, using a backwards chewing stroke. Multituberculates are thought to have had a sprawling posture, and Catopsbaatar may have been able to jump. Catopsbaatar is known from the Barun Goyot Formation, which is thought to be about 72 million years old.

== Taxonomy ==
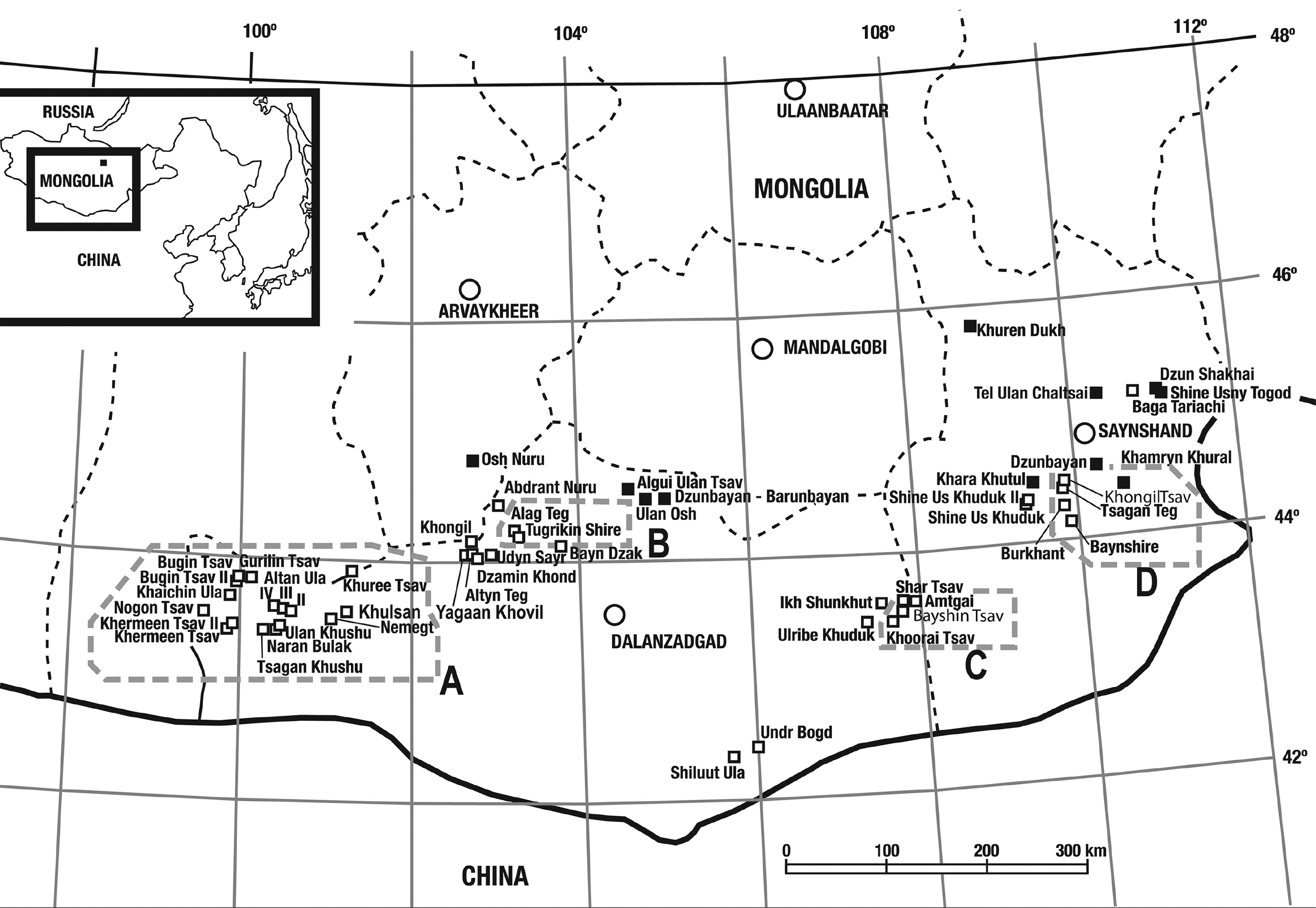
Cretaceous-aged fossil localities of Mongolia; Catopsbaatar was collected in area A (Khermeen Tsav I, II, and Khulsan at the left)

In 1970 and 1971, the Polish-Mongolian Palaeontological Expeditions collected mammalian fossils from the Barun Goyot Formation at the Red Beds of Hermiin Tsav (also spelled "Khermeen Tsav") area in Mongolia's Gobi Desert. About 100 specimens, recovered from four localities, are housed at the Polish Academy of Sciences in Warsaw. Two-thirds of the collected specimens were multituberculates: an extinct order of mammals with rodent-like dentition, named for the numerous cusps (or tubercles) on their molars. In 1974, Polish palaeontologist Zofia Kielan-Jaworowska named a new species of the Mongolian multituberculate genus Djadochtatherium as D. catopsaloides, with specimen ZPAL MgM−I/78 from the Polish collection as the holotype. The specific name refers to the animal's similarity to the North American species Catopsalis joyneri, which Kielan-Jaworowska thought was a possible descendant. The specimen, collected at the Hermiin Tsav I locality, is an almost-complete skull of a juvenile with portions of the cranium damaged. Kielan-Jaworowska also assigned other specimens to the species: a damaged skull missing lower jaws (ZPAL MgM−I/79, an adult), a skull with partial lower jaws (ZPAL MgM−I/80), and a molar with a fragment of jaw (ZPAL MgM−I/159 from Khulsan, the only specimen not from the Hermiin Tsav I and II localities).

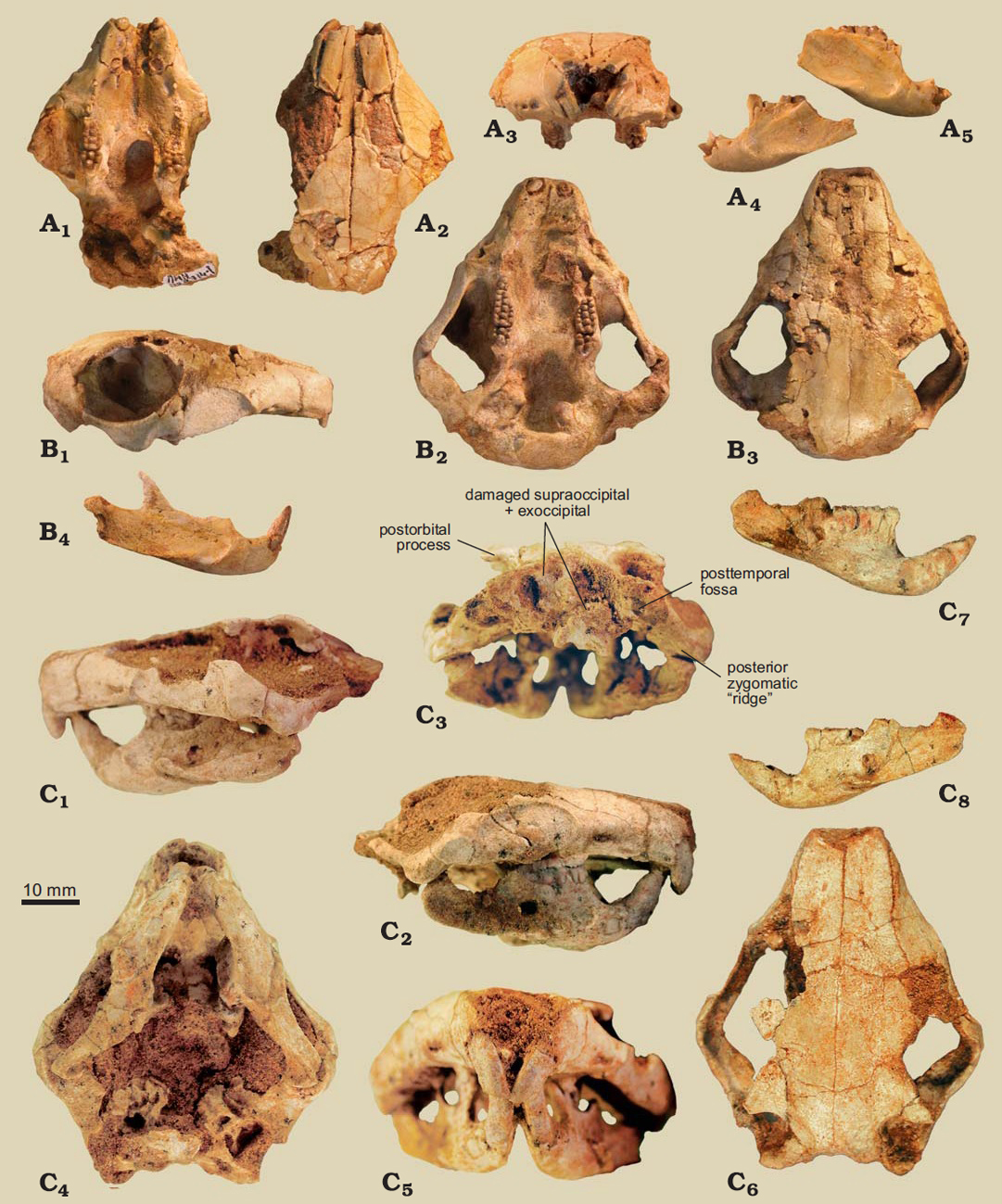
Three skulls with jaws (A and B were collected in 1975, C in 1999), showing differences in size related to their individual ages.

Kielan-Jaworowska and American palaeontologist Robert E. Sloan considered the genus Djadochtatherium a junior synonym of Catopsalis, and created the new combination C. catopsaloides in 1979. American palaeontologists Nancy B. Simmons and Miao Desui conducted a 1986 cladistic analysis which indicated that Catopsalis was a paraphyletic taxon (an unnatural grouping of species), and C. catopsaloides required its own generic name. Kielan-Jaworowska followed Simmons and Miao's suggestion, moving C. catopsaloides to its own monotypic genus in 1994, Catopsbaatar. The word catops is derived from the Greek katoptos ("visible" or "evident"); baatar is Mongolian for "hero", and the name refers to Catopsbaatar's similarity to the genus Catopsalis (as is the case for the specific name). The name Catopsalis itself consists of the Greek words for "visible" and "cutting shears" (psalis). The word baatar is used as a suffix in the names of many multituberculate genera, and alludes to the Mongolian capital Ulaanbaatar, which itself means "red hero".

Later in 1994, Kielan-Jaworowska and the Russian palaeontologist Petr P. Gambaryan mentioned caudal (tail) vertebrae which may have belonged to Catopsbaatar; this attribution is uncertain, since they may instead belong to the related Tombaatar (named in 1997). A fourth skull (PIN 4537/4, a juvenile), discovered during the 1975 Soviet−Mongolian Expedition, was mentioned by Gambaryan and Kielan-Jaworowska in 1995. Canadian palaeontologist Phillip J. Currie found a new Catopsbaatar specimen during the 1999 Dinosaurs of the Gobi expedition, organised by the American Nomadic Expeditions Company. Housed at the Mongolian Academy of Sciences in Ulaanbaatar as PM120/107, this most completely preserved known specimen consists of the complete skull (which may be slightly flattened) and partial skeleton of an adult individual. The specimen has rather complete fore- and hind limbs, which were unknown for the genus until then and which are generally rarely preserved in multituberculates. Its pelvic ilia were stolen and destroyed by a schoolboy on tour at the Natural History Museum of Oslo, where it was being prepared in 2000. The specimen was reported in 2002 by Kielan-Jaworowska, Norwegian palaeontologist Jørn Hurum, Currie and Mongolian palaeontologist Rinchen Barsbold, who also mentioned another skull (PIN 4537/5, a juvenile) found during the 1975 expedition. Catopsalis joyneri, the basis of the name C. catopsaloides, was moved to the new genus Valenopsalis in 2015.

=== Evolution ===
Catopsbaatar belonged to the order Multituberculata, a group within Allotheria (an infraclass of mammals outside Theria, the group that contains modern placentals and marsupials). Multituberculates are characterised by having premolars and molars with multiple low cusps, arranged in longitudinal rows. They are the best-known group of mammals from the Mesozoic Era, when the dinosaurs dominated; although the earliest multituberculate remains are from the Jurassic Period, the group is known as recently as the Eocene Epoch (thereby surviving the Cretaceous–Paleogene extinction event). The group may have become extinct due to competition with eutherian mammals, such as rodents. Multituberculates were mainly known from teeth and jaws until the 1920s, when more complete specimens were discovered—first in Asia, and then elsewhere. Postcranial bones (the rest of the skeleton, other than the skull) remain rare.

Kielan-Jaworowska originally classified Catopsbaatar as a member of the multituberculate family Taeniolabididae in 1974. In 1994, she suggested that Djadochtatherium was close to Catopsbaatar's ancestry. She and Hurum named a new family of multituberculates, Djadochtatheriidae (which they placed in the new suborder Djadochtatheria), in 1997. The family included the genera Djadochtatherium, Catopsbaatar, Kryptobaatar, and Tombaatar, all from the Gobi Desert. The family differs from other multituberculates (and other mammals) in that the front margins of its snout were confluent with the zygomatic arches (cheekbones), giving the snout a trapezoid shape when seen from above. In general, other mammals have snouts where the side margins are curved inward in front of the zygomatic arches. Kielan-Jaworowska and Hurum revised the higher ranks within Multituberculata in 2001, replacing the suborder Djadochtatheria with the superfamily Djadochtatherioidea (placed in the suborder Cimolodonta).

Comparison of the skulls of the djadochtatheriids Kryptobaatar (A), Djadochtatherium (B), and Catopsbaatar (C), with muscle scars (surrounded by the zygomatic ridges) shaded

The following cladogram shows the placement of Catopsbaatar among other multituberculates according to Kielan-Jaworowska and Hurum, 1997:

- Ptilodus
- - Buginbaatar
  - - Djadochtatheria
      - - - Lambdopsalis
          - Taeniolabis
        - - - Eucosmodontidae
              - - Stygimys
                - Eucosmodon
          - - - Nemegtbaatar
              - Bulganbaatar
            - - - Kamptobaatar
                - Sloanbaatar
                - Nessovbaatar
              - - Chulsanbaatar
                - - Djadochtatheriidae
                    - - Kryptobaatar
                      - - Djadochtatherium
                        - - Catopsbaatar
                          - Tombaatar

== Description ==
=== Skull ===
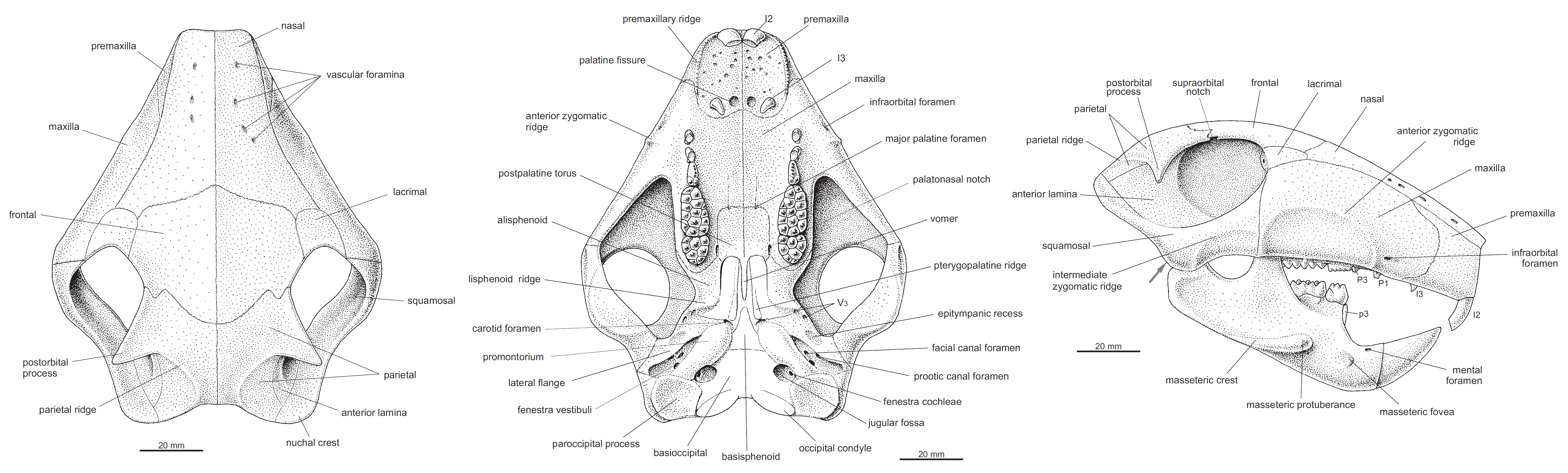
Reconstructed adult skull from above, below, and the side. Note that the upper P1 and P3 premolars are included, although these disappeared as an individual aged.

The most complete adult Catopsbaatar skull (specimen PM 120/107) is 63 mm (2.5 in) long and 55 mm (2.2 in) wide, with a 41 mm-long (1.6 in) lower jaw. By comparison, the skull of the juvenile holotype (ZPAL MgM−I/78) is about 53 mm (2.1 inches) long and 56 mm (2.2 inches) wide, with a 35 mm-long (1.4 in) lower jaw. The largest adult skull (ZPAL MgM−I/79) is 70 mm (2.8 in) long but, since it is incomplete, its other measurements are unknown. Catopsbaatar was larger than its relatives, Kryptobaatar and Djadochtatherium. Multituberculates had relatively large skulls and short necks; their skulls were proportionally longer and wider than those of similarly sized rodents and marsupials. The external appearance of their heads may have been similar to those of rodents.

The skull of Catopsbaatar was heavy-set, with a wide margin across the front. It was shorter along the midline than at the sides, because the nuchal crest at the back of the head curved inwards at the middle, creating an indention at the hind margin of the skull when viewed from above. The zygomatic arches were strongly expanded to the sides, with the skull width (across the arches) about 85 percent of the skull length. The front of the orbits (eye sockets) were further back than in other djadochtatheriids, resulting in a more elongated snout (65 percent of the skull length) and small orbits. The premaxilla (front bone of the upper jaw) extended less than two-thirds of the length of the snout in front of the eyes, shorter than that of Kryptobaatar. The premaxilla consisted of parts of the face and the palate; djadochtatheriids had a premaxillary ridge on the boundary between the two (visible when viewing the skull from below). The palatal part of the premaxilla was concave, with many randomly arranged nutrient foramina (openings). The nasal bone—which formed the upper part of the snout—was relatively wide (becoming wider towards the back), and its front was covered with irregularly spaced vascular foramina. The suture between the nasal and frontal bones was less pointed forwards in the middle than were those of Catopsbaatar's relatives.

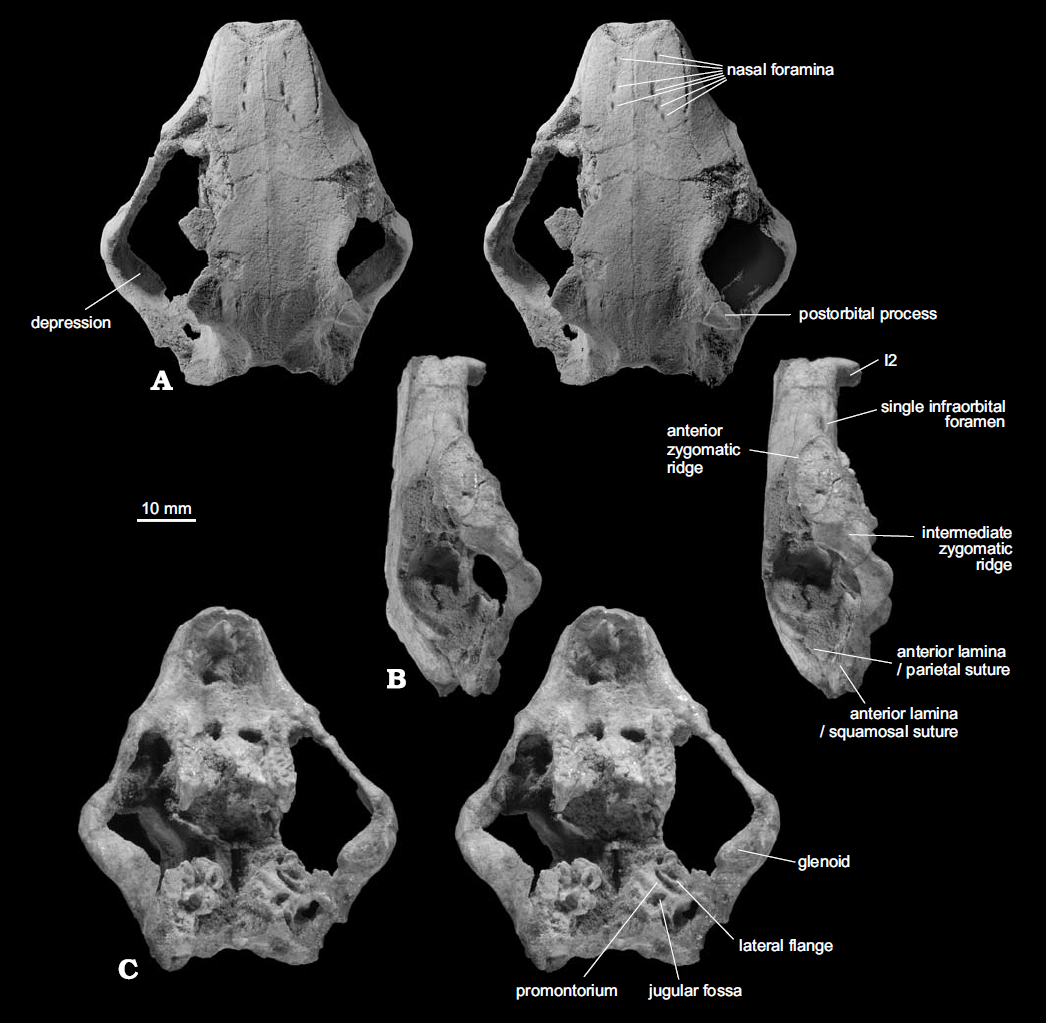
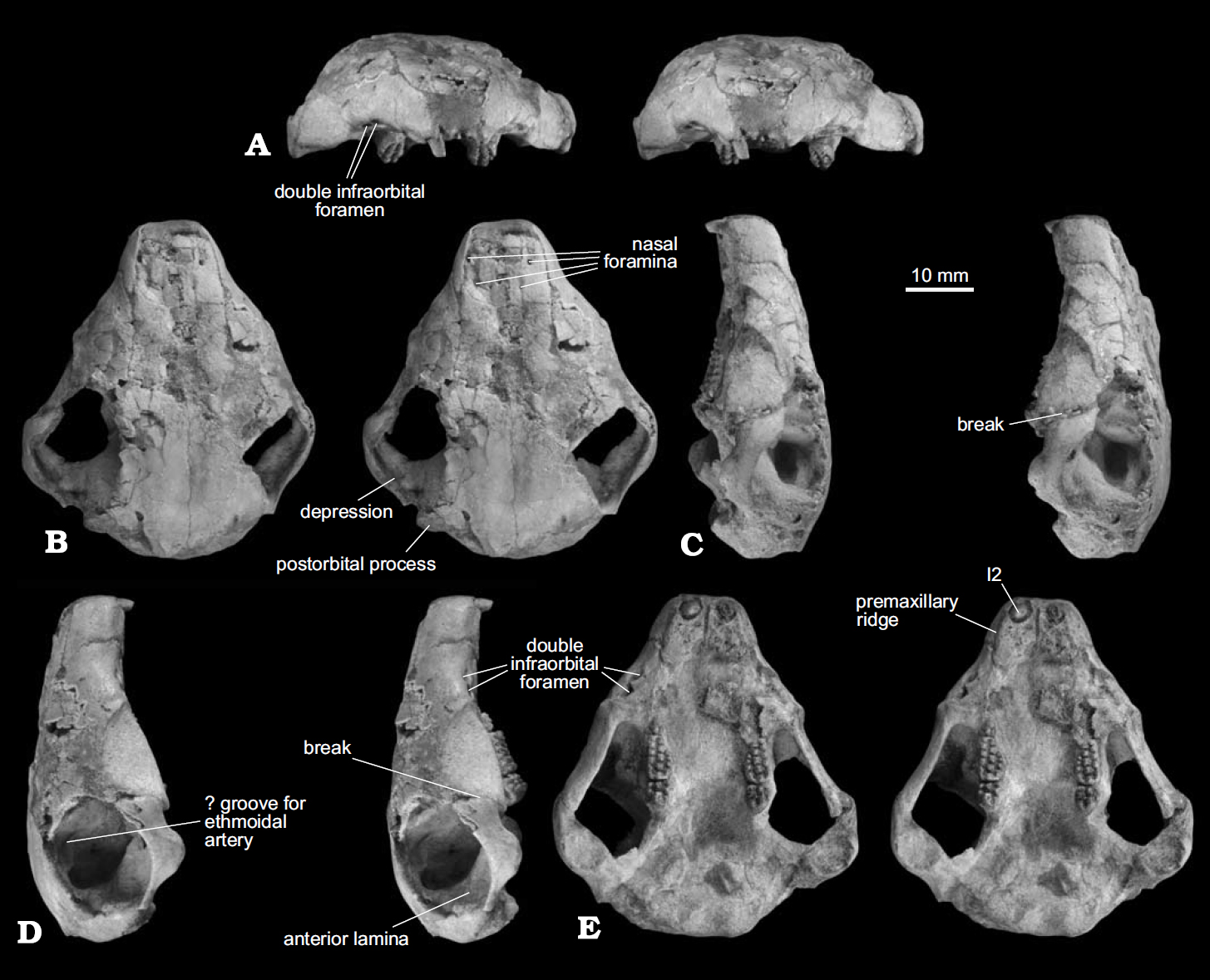
Stereo photographs showing the most complete adult skull (left, PM 120/107) and a juvenile skull (right, PIN 4537/5) from multiple angles

The maxilla (the main part of the upper jaw) was extensive, and formed most of the side of the snout. It contained all the upper teeth, except the incisors. The infraorbital foramina (openings at the lower front of the maxilla) were slit-like in some specimens and rounded in others, and varied in number from one to three. One of the most characteristic features of the face of Catopsbaatar was the very large anterior zygomatic ridge on the sides of the upper jaw (a site for jaw-muscle attachment). It was much higher than in other djadochtatheriids except for Djadochtatherium, from which it differed in that the ridge was semicircular rather than roughly trapezoidal (other genera have elliptical ridges). The front margin of the anterior zygomatic ridge was thickened, which produced a bulge on the side margin of the snout when viewed from the side and above. The lower part of the suture between the maxilla and the squamosal bone extended along the hind border of the anterior zygomatic ridge. The palatal processes of the maxilla formed most of the palate. The major palatine foramina had shallow grooves extending forward. The postpalatine torus (a bony protrusion on the palate) of Catopsbaatar was less prominent than was that of Tombaatar. The frontal bone was large, and formed most of the cranial roof. The suture between the frontal and parietal bones formed a U-shaped part in the middle which pointed backwards—similar to the condition in Kryptobaatar but less deep, with smaller U-shaped structures at the sides. This differed from Djadochtatherium, which had a narrower V-shaped suture between the frontal and parietal bones.

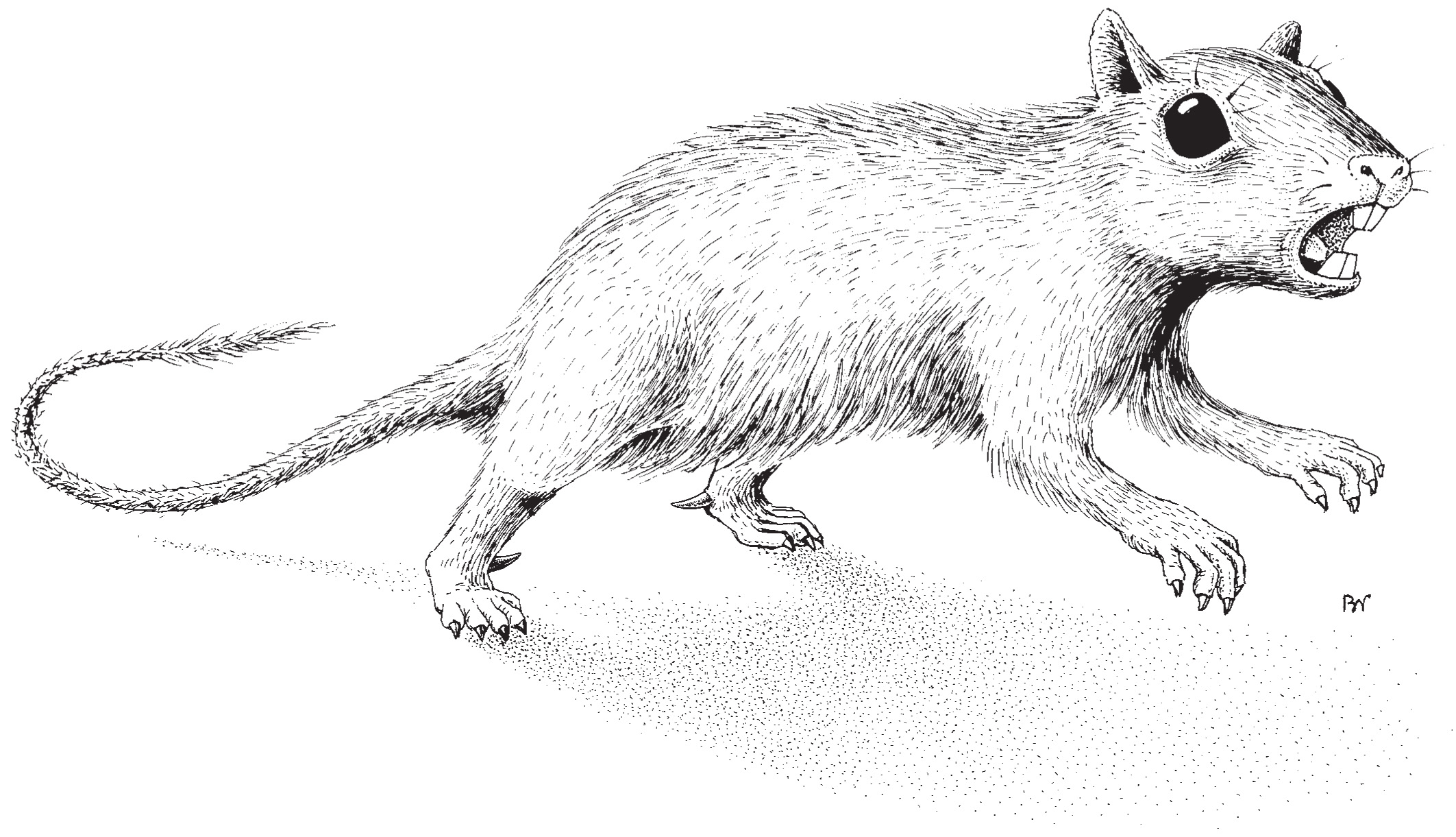
Restoration of an individual in aggressive posture, with sprawling limbs and spurs on the ankles similar to those of the male platypus

The intermediate zygomatic ridge on the squamosal bone (also for jaw-muscle attachment) was much smaller and lower than the anterior zygomatic ridge in front of it. Catopsbaatar differed from other djadochtatheriids in that the intermediate ridge contacted the anterior ridge with its front edge. The posterior zygomatic ridge at the lower back of the squamosal bone was the weakest of the three ridges, and only marked by a depression. The postorbital processes behind the orbit on the parietal bone were very long, and the parietal ridges extended from the hind margin of the postorbital processes towards each other (but without reaching). The nuchal crest was very prominent, and extended to the sides to form "wings". The occipital plate was almost vertical and slightly concave, and was obscured by the nuchal crest when the skull was viewed from above. Though incompletely preserved, it is assumed that the occipital plate sloped back and upwards from the occipital condyles (as in some relatives). The orbito-temporal vascular system inside the skull of Catopsbaatar did not differ much from those of related genera.

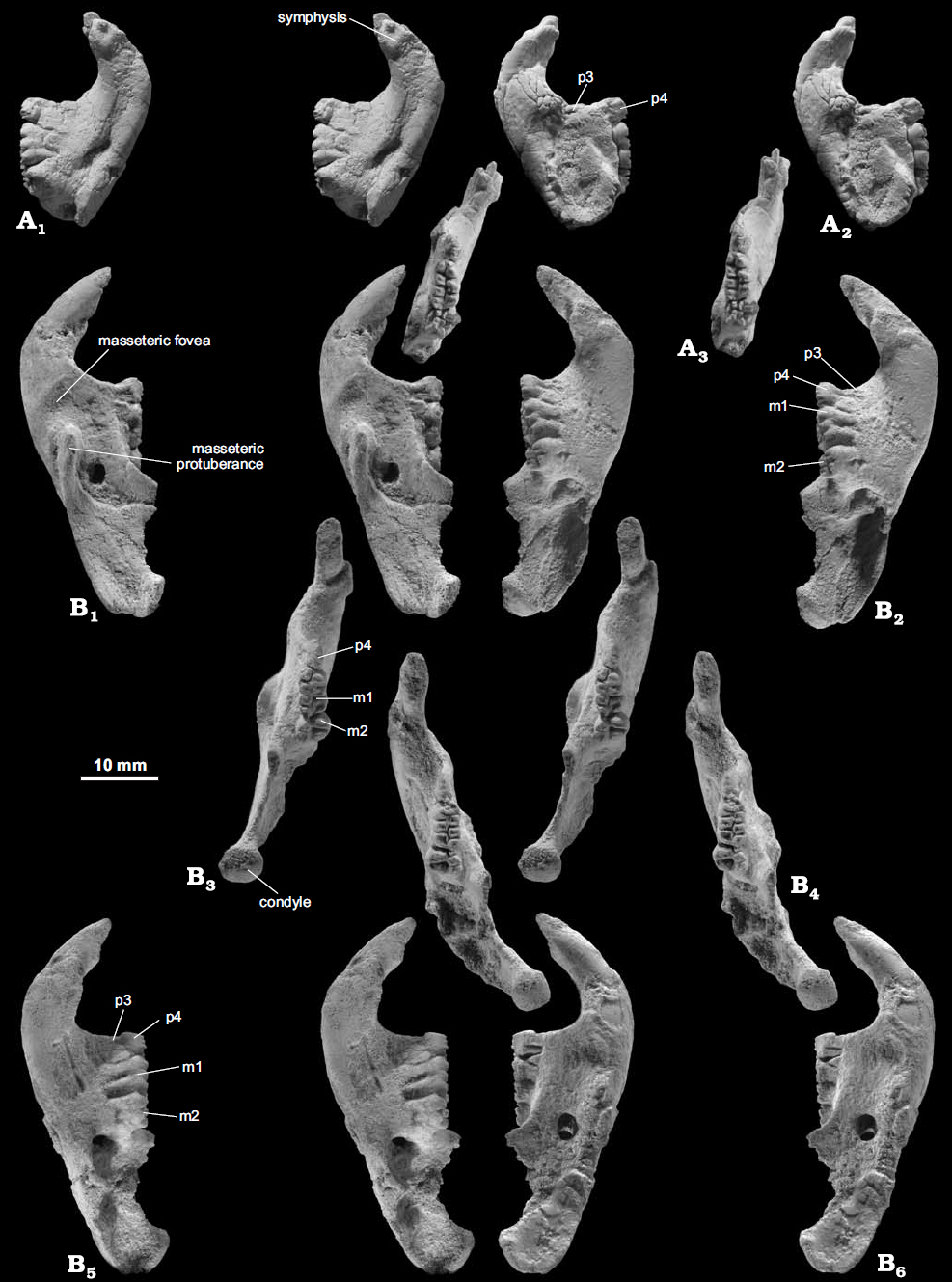
Multiple views of the dentaries of two specimens

Catopsbaatar's mandible was robust and very elongated. The diastema (gap between the front and cheek teeth) was concave, and extended for 20 percent of the dentary bone (the main bone of the lower jaw). Seen from above, the diastema formed a wide shelf that sloped downwards on the inner side of the jaw. The small mental foramen was close to the upper middle margin of the diastema. The coronoid process of the mandible appears to have been relatively longer and narrower than in other djadochtatherioids. It was separated from the alveolar process (where the teeth are contained) by a wide groove. The mandibular condyle (which articulated with the skull) was slightly above the level of the molars. The front part of the masseteric crest was very prominent, forming a bulge known as a masseteric protuberance. The robustness of this crest and the presence of the protuberance varies among related genera. The masseteric fovea (pit) in front of the masseteric fossa was probably more distinct than in other djadochtatherioids. Each half of the mandibular symphysis (where the two halves of the mandible connect) was shaped like an upside-down teardrop. The pterygoid fossa on the inner side of the mandible was very large, and occupied most of the hind part of the dentary. The lower part of this fossa had a boundary, known as the pterygoideus shelf.

=== Dentition ===
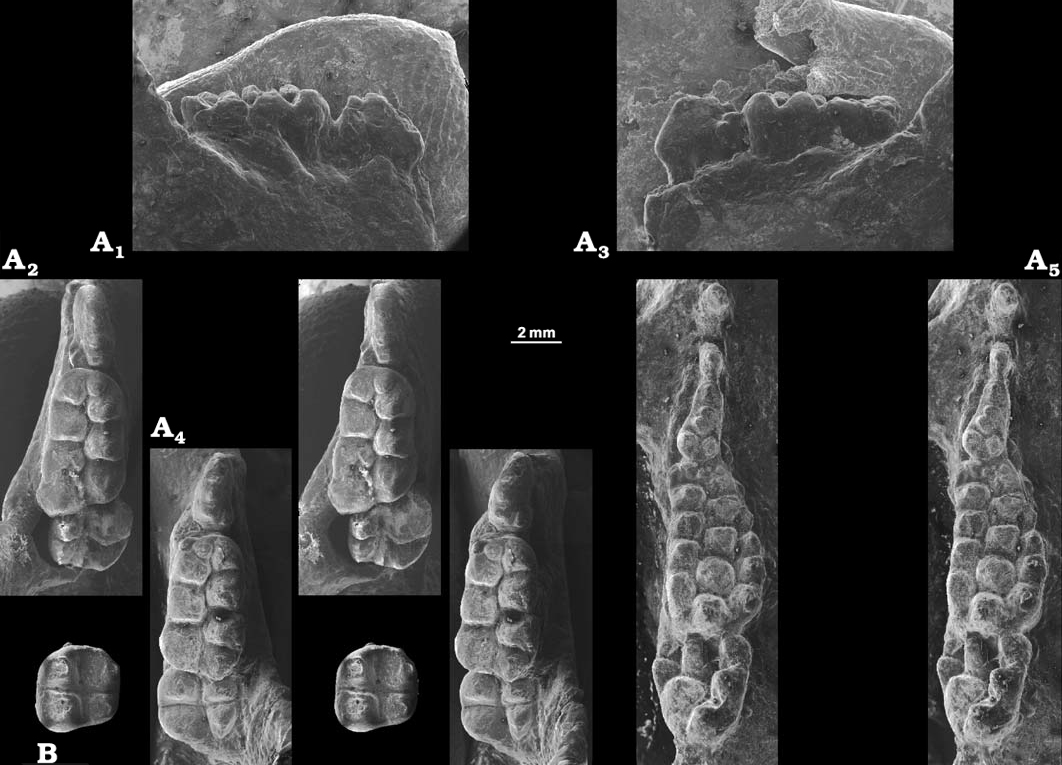
Stereo micrographs showing premolars and molars of the holotype, including an isolated molar (B)

The dental formula (the number of teeth of each type in the tooth row of a mammal) of Catopsbaatar was 2.0.3.21.0.2.2 (two incisors, no canines, three premolars and two molars in half of the upper tooth row, and one incisor, no canines, two premolars and two molars in half of the lower). By comparison, the dental formula of humans is 2.1.2.2–32.1.2.2–3. Each tooth in a mammal is designated with a letter and number by position (I for incisor, C for canine, P for premolar, M for molar); the letters are capitalised for the teeth of the upper jaw, but not for those in the lower jaw. The cusp formula shows the arrangement and number of cusps in consecutive rows of a tooth, from the outer to the inner side; each row is separated by a colon.

Being a cimolodont, Catopsbaatar did not have I1 incisors. The I2 upper-front incisors of Catopsbaatar were very robust and had a sharply limited band of enamel. The two incisors converged slightly towards the middle, touching each other. The smaller I3 incisor behind was cone-shaped. The alveolus (tooth socket) of Catopsbaatar's I3 incisor was formed by the premaxilla, rather than the premaxilla and maxilla (unlike in Tombaatar). The front upper premolars P1 and P3 were only present in juveniles (deciduous), disappearing (with their alveoli) in older individuals. P1 appears to have had two cusps, was single-rooted, and had a cone-like, blunt crown. P3 was single-rooted and smaller than P1. The cusp formula of the P4 premolar was 5−4:1, the central cusp being the largest. The P4 of Catopsbaatar was almost trapezoidal in shape (unlike in Djadochtatherium and Kryptobaatar, where it is crescent-shaped), smaller, and lacking ridges. Catopsbaatar also differed by having only three upper premolars, lacking the P2 (a feature shared with Tombaatar). Other mammals usually evolve the loss of teeth at the beginning or end of a tooth row, not in the middle (as in multituberculates). The cusp formula of the M1 molar was 5−6:5−6:4, with the inner ridge extending about 75 percent of the tooth's length. The cusps of M1 were sharp and unworn in juveniles, but worn and concave in older animals. The cusp formula of the M2 molar was 2:2−3:2−3.

Catopsbaatar had a single lower pair of incisors, characteristic of multituberculates, which was very strong and compressed sideways. It had a sharply limited band of enamel, and grew continually. The p3 premolar was very small, and adhered entirely to the lower diastema under the larger p4. The blade-like p4 was roughly trapezoidal in side view, and had three cusps along the horizontal upper margin and one cusp on the outer back side. The p4 did not have the ridges on the outer and inner side, as are present in other multituberculates. The m1 molar was almost symmetrical, and its cusp formula was 4:4, the size of the cusps decreasing towards the back. The m2 had a cusp formula of 2−3:2, most specimens being 2:2. The cusps on the inner side were wider than those on the outer side, the inner row of cusps was shorter than the outer one, and the hind margin of the tooth was arranged obliquely.

=== Postcranial skeleton ===
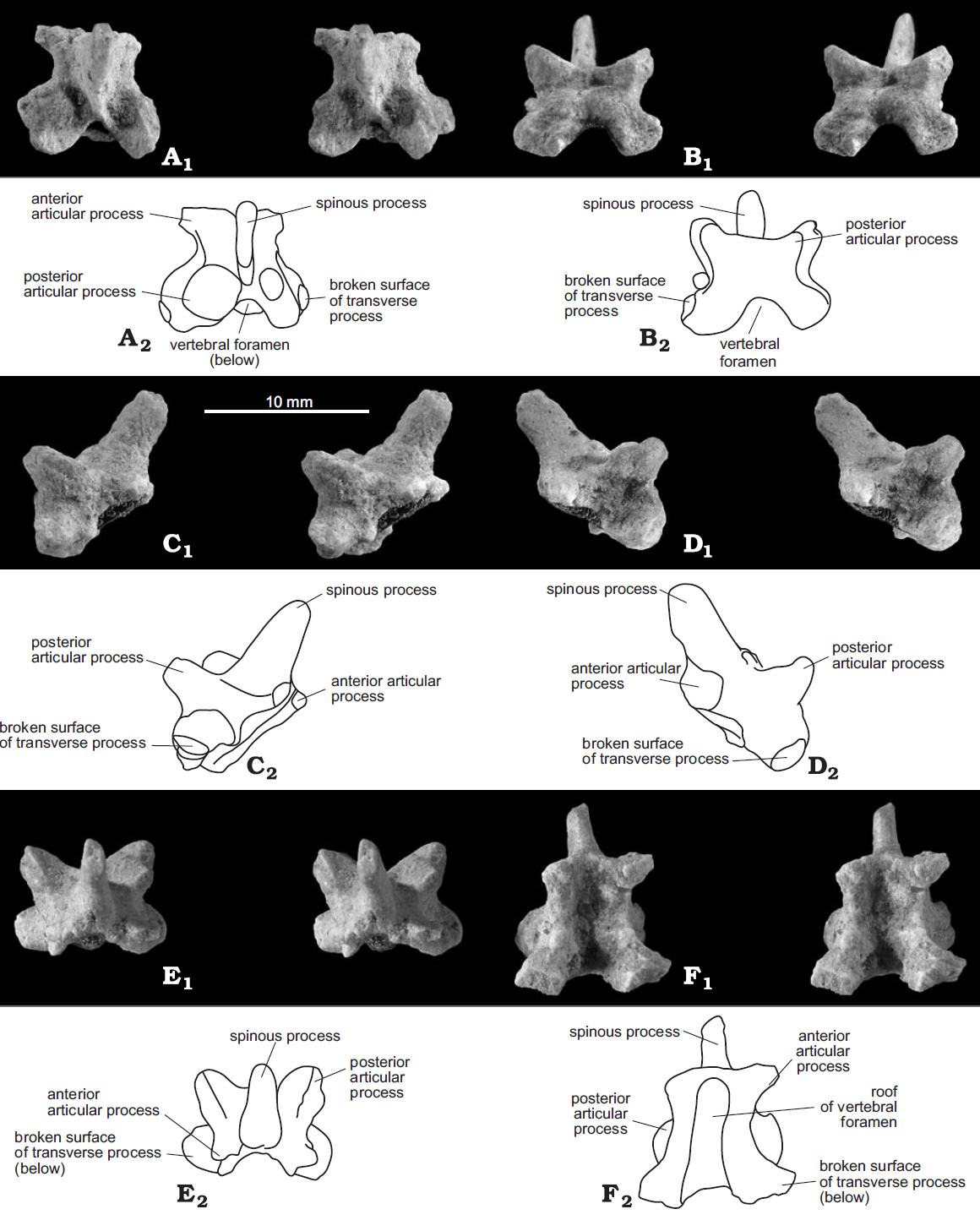
Lumbar vertebra of PM120/107 in multiple views

The only Catopsbaatar specimen which preserves the postcranial skeleton is PM120/107, which is fragmentary. It includes elements that are unknown, or incompletely preserved, in other multituberculates. One lumbar vertebra (the fifth or sixth, from between the rib cage and the pelvis) had a spinous process which was stout in side view and long when seen from above. The clavicle was slightly less curved than that of Kryptobaatar (resembling a bent rod which widened at each end), and measured about 24.8 mm (0.98 in). The upper part of the scapulocoracoid was relatively wide in side view, and the lower part was very narrow. It was probably about 60 mm (2.4 in) long when complete. The preserved part of the humerus (upper arm bone) was about 37.5 mm (1.48 in) long. Its shaft was triangular in cross-section, relatively narrow when seen from above, and most of its width was occupied by the intertubercular groove. This groove was delimited on the side by the crest of the greater tubercle, whose middle part formed the deltopectoral crest. The ulnar condyle, where the ulna of the lower arm articulated with the humerus, was more prominent than the radial condyle (where the radius articulated), oval, and delimited from the radial condyle by a groove. The radius was about 26 mm (1.0 in) long, with a prominent head. Its shaft was smooth, compressed from top to bottom, and oval in cross-section. The ulna was compressed sideways, flatter than the radius, and about 40 mm (1.6 in) long as preserved.

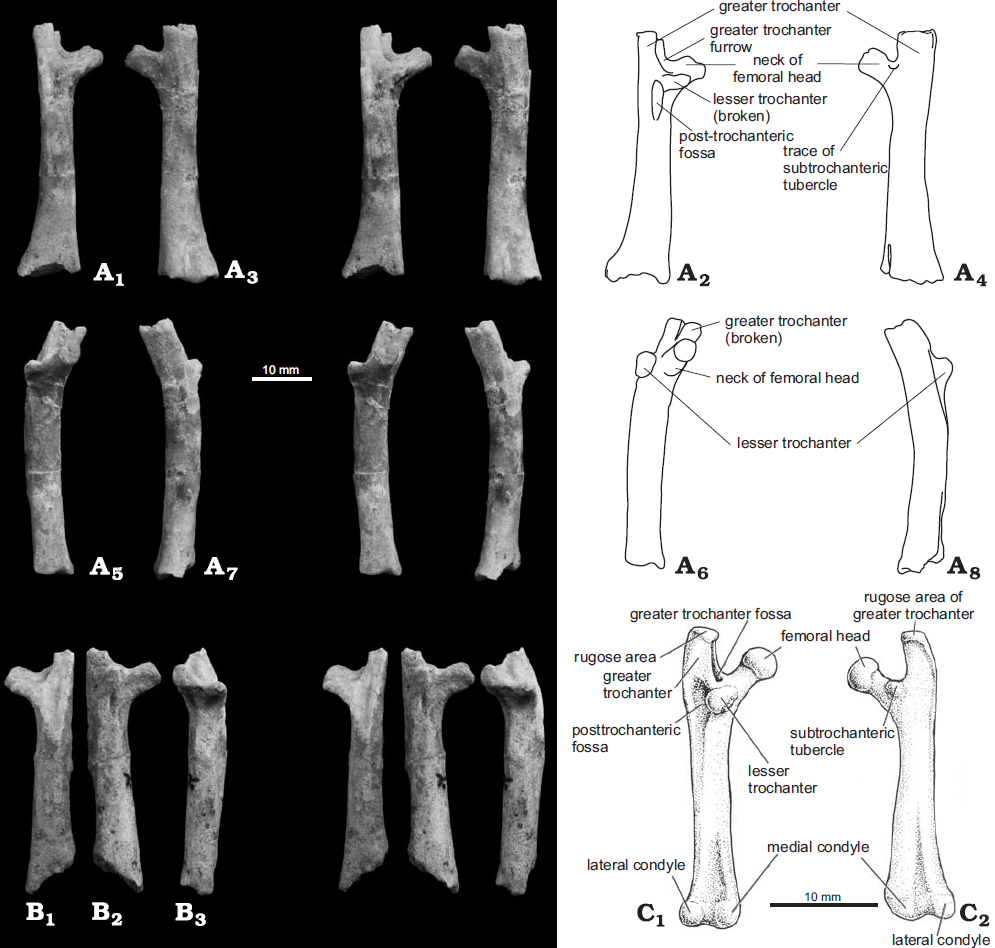
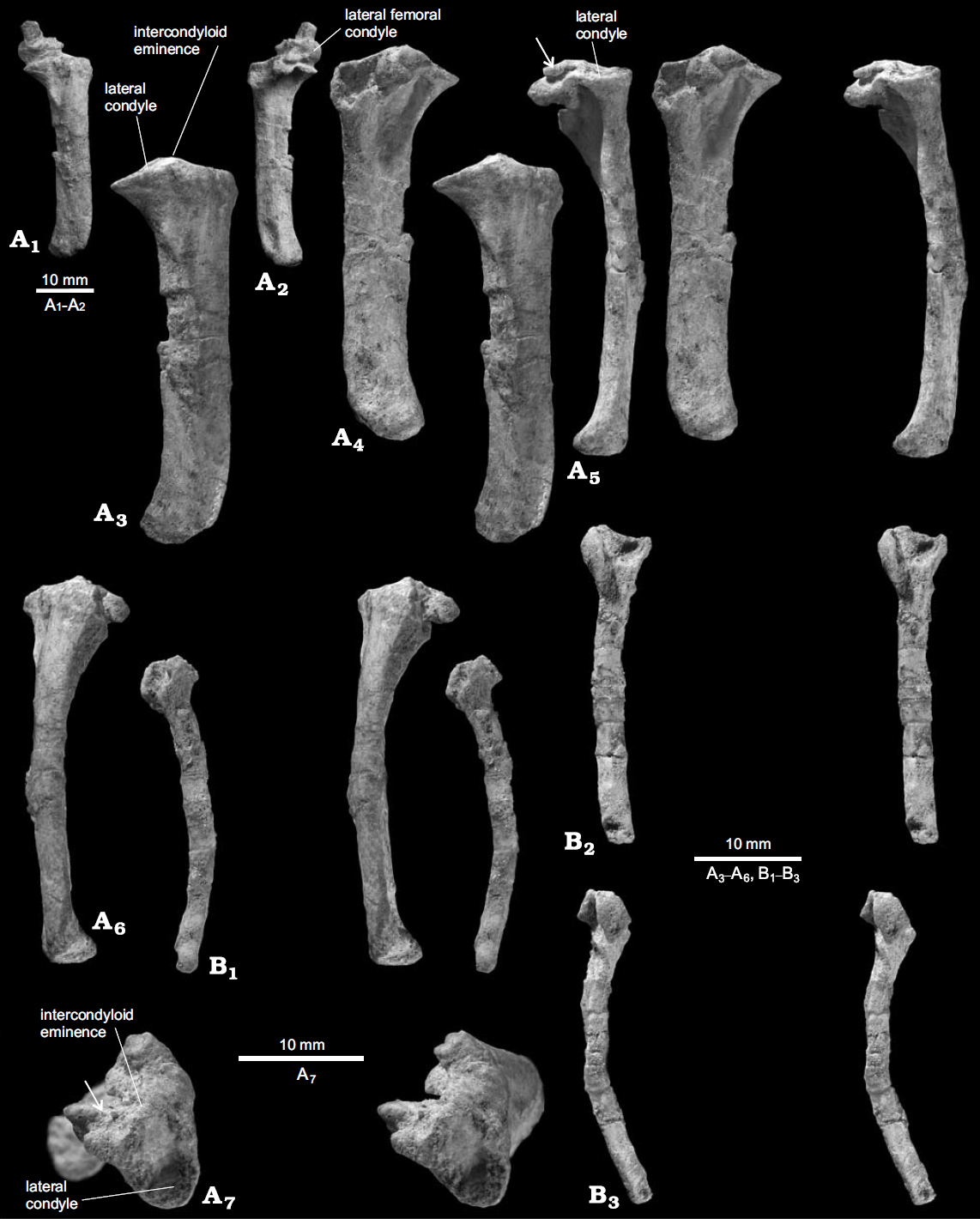
Stereo photos and diagrams showing the femora (left), tibia and fibula (right) from the legs of PM120/107

The contact from the ischium to the ilium and pubis of the pelvis was not fused, and the front end of the ischium formed a rugose suture. The pubis was roughly triangular, with a rough suture for the ilium above and a deep groove for the ischium at the lower front. Specimen PM120/107's pelvic bones differed from those of other multituberculates in not being fused together. The presence of sutures in the pelvis of PM120/107 indicates that it was a juvenile, although the skull appears adult; the meaning of this discrepancy is unknown. The femur (thigh bone) was proportionally similar to that of Eucosmodon and Nemegtbaatar—smaller than the former, but larger than the latter. The femur was stout relative to its length, and it may have been about 56 mm (2.2 in) long. The tibia of the lower leg was about 35.8 mm (1.41 in) long. Seen from behind the upper side, the tibia had a deep excavation (cavity) which may be characteristic of multituberculates.

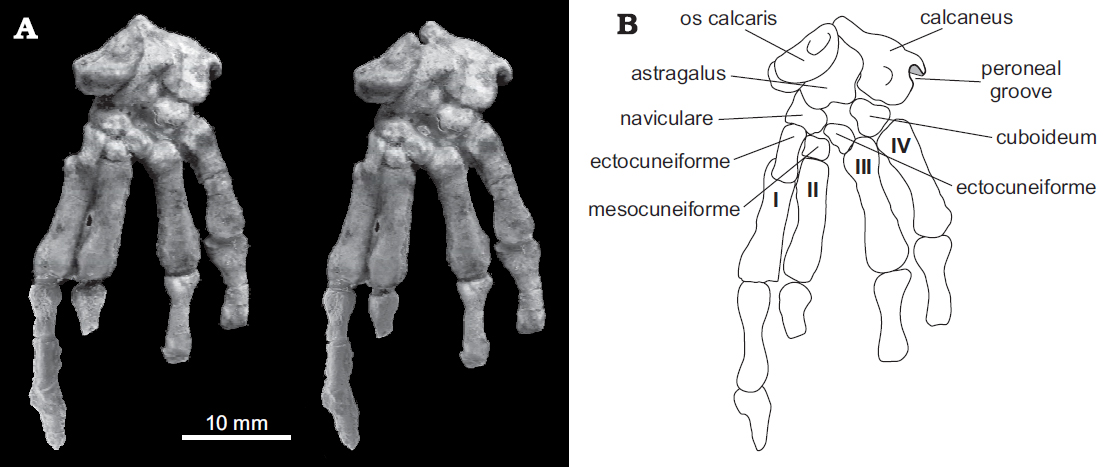
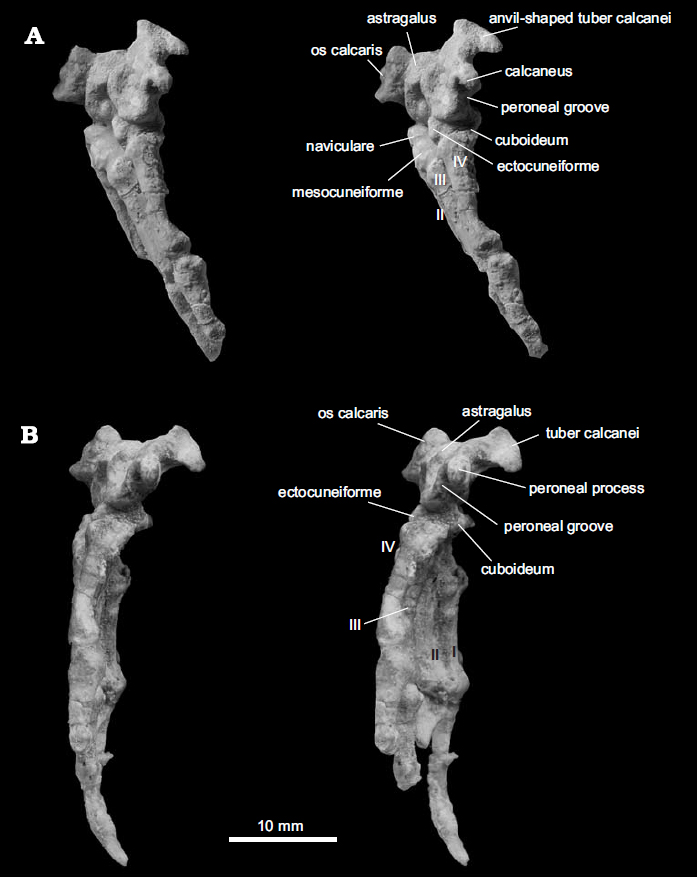
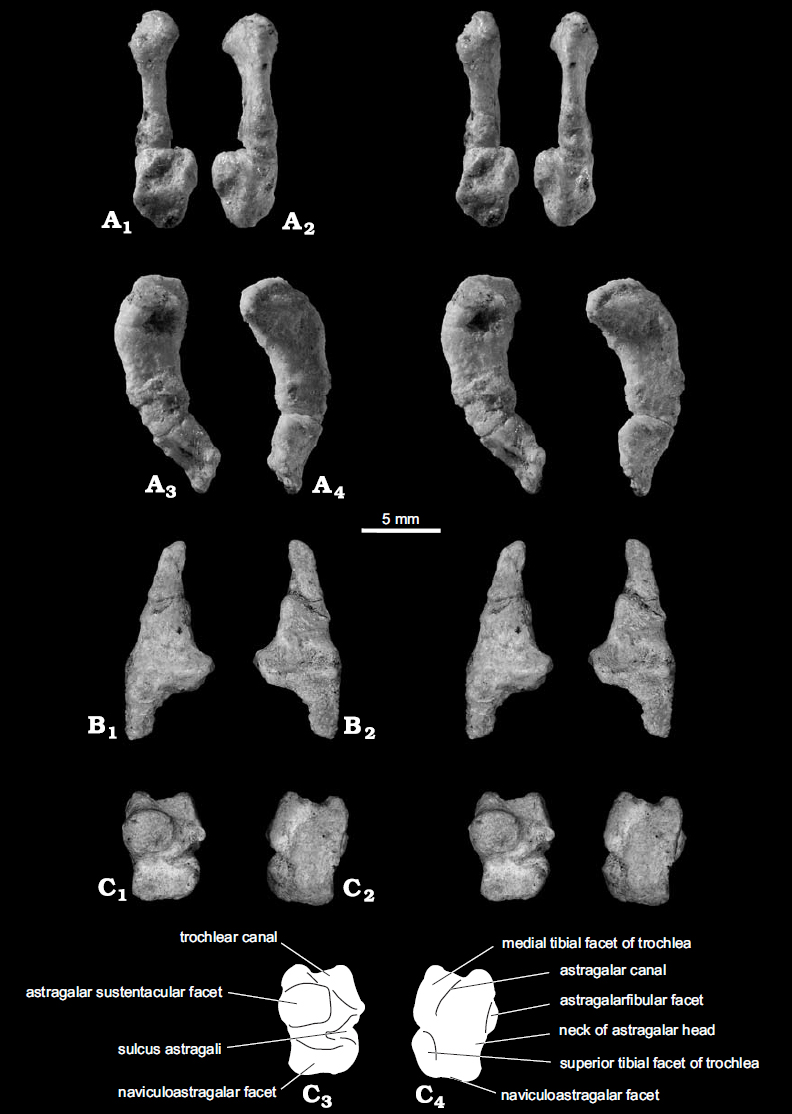
Left foot in top view (above, with diagram), foot in side view (lower left), and individual foot bones including the spur (lower right, the spur is B: cornu calcaris) of PM120/107

Unlike most other multituberculates and other mammals, the calcaneus bone at the back of the foot had a short tuber calcanei (like some tree kangaroos), with an expanded, anvil-shaped proximal process strongly bent downwards and to the side. Catopsbaatar had an os calcaris bone on the inner side of its ankle, a feature also seen in modern male monotremes (the platypus and the echidna) and other Mesozoic mammals. The os calcaris bone was plate-like and rectangular in outline; as in monotremes, it supported the cornu calcaris in forming a spur on the outer side of the tarsus (cluster of foot bones). Unlike with other Mesozoic mammals, these two elements were not fused together in multituberculates. The cornu calcaris was triangular, with a concavity in the middle, and was 13 mm (0.51 in) long. The spur was flattened, and was thicker at its conjunction with the os calcaris (where they connected via several ridges). As the spur of PM120/107 may have been moved from its original position, it is unknown whether it faced inwards (like in the platypus). Unlike in the platypus, there was no impression of a canal for venom. The cornu calcaris of Catopsbaatar was ossified (turned into bone) and would have been covered in keratin (the horny covering seen in nails and hoofs). The cornu calcaris of the platypus consists only of keratin, and is hollow.

== Palaeobiology ==
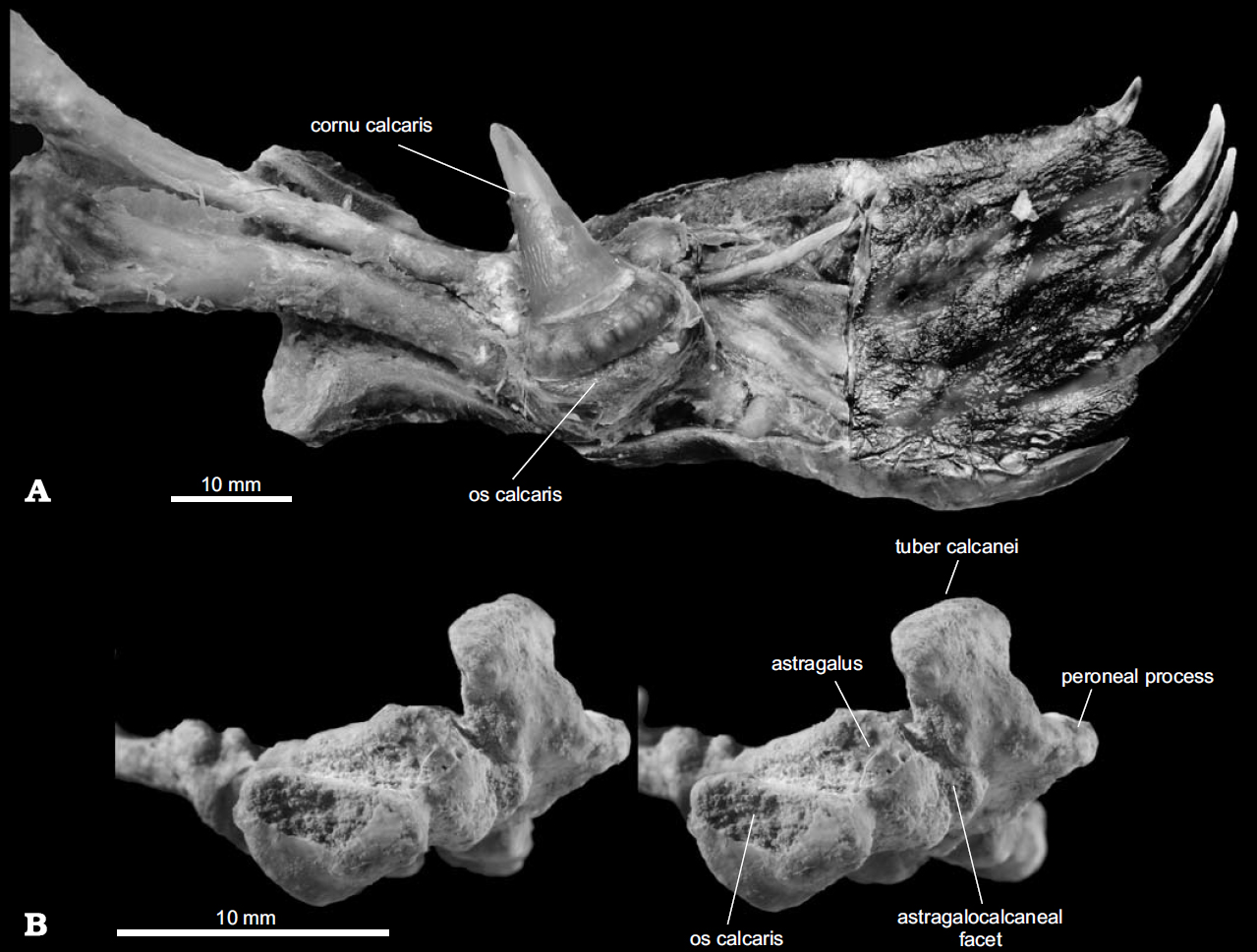
Comparison of the os calcaris bone in a platypus (A) and Catopsbaatar (B), which forms the base of the spur

Hurum, Zhe-Xi Luo, and Kielan-Jaworowska suggested in 2006 that the spurs on the ankles of Mesozoic mammals (such as Catopsbaatar) were homologous with those of monotremes, and were a basal (or "primitive") feature lost by later therian mammals. The male platypus uses the spur to deliver venom from a gland, but it is unknown if the extinct groups were venomous as well. Mesozoic mammals were mostly small (with exceptions such as the fox-sized Repenomamus) and, although they were too small to be prey for large theropod dinosaurs, smaller theropods, large lizards, crocodiles, and birds could have fed on them. For example, mammal jaws have been found in the abdomen of a specimen of the small theropod Sinosauropteryx; the jaws belonged to Zhangheotherium, which also had spurs, and the multituberculate Sinobaatar. Since dinosaurs dominated Earth during the Mesozoic, this period has been called the "dark ages" of mammalian history. The spur, which would have been more effective if venomous, was probably used as a defensive weapon by small, early mammals. It could also have been used during intraspecific competition or predation.

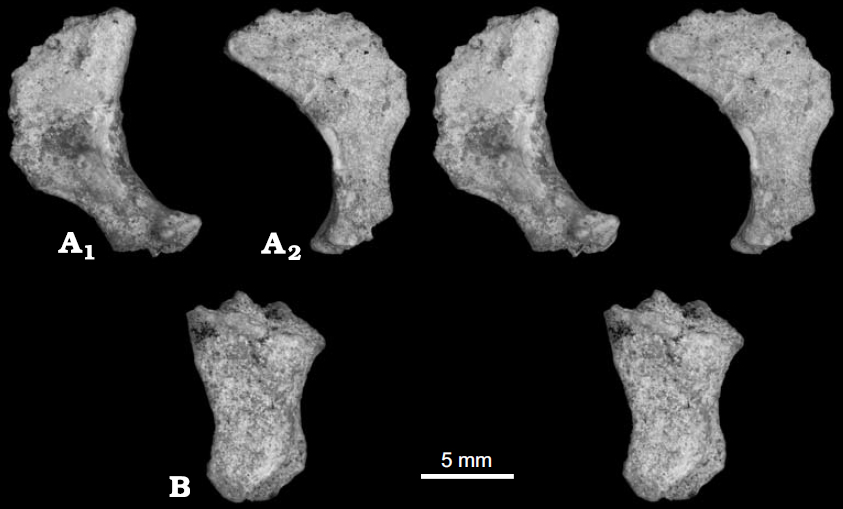
Stereo photos of PM120/107's ischia and pubis from the pelvis

The pelvic bones of Catopsbaatar specimen PM120/107 may not have been fused because fusion occurred late in development, because it was a sexually dimorphic feature occurring only in males (unfused pelvic bones might have enabled expansion of the birth canal in females), or pelvic fusion may be a taxonomic difference between Catopsbaatar and other multituberculates. Unlike with other mammals, the pelvis of multituberculates was very narrow; in other genera where the pelvis is known, each half of the pubis and ischium were fused together, forming a keel. The length and rigidity of the keel indicate that the pelvis could not have spread during birth. Because there would be little space for the passage of an egg (egg-laying monotremes have wide ischial arches), Kielan-Jaworowska suggested in 1979 that multituberculates were viviparous (gave live birth) and that the newborns were extremely small—similar to those of marsupials.

Hair, structurally similar to that of modern mammals and associated with bones of the Mongolian multituberculate Lambdopsalis, has been identified in coprolites (fossilised feces) of carnivorous mammals from the Palaeocene Epoch. This indicates that multituberculates had hair for insulation, similar to modern mammals (and possibly fossil mammals), a feature probably related to homeothermy (warm-bloodedness).

=== Feeding and diet ===
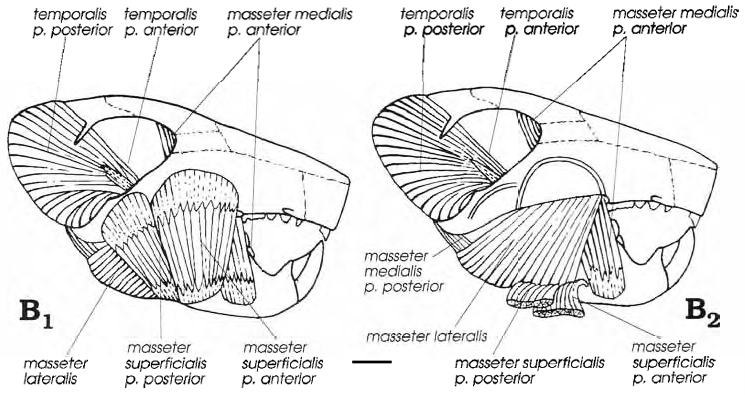
Reconstructed jaw musculature; B1 shows superficial layers, and B2 shows second layers.

Although multituberculates were thought to have been carnivores or herbivores, since American palaeontologist William A. Clemens and Kielan-Jaworowska suggested modern rat kangaroos as analogues for the group in 1979 they have been considered omnivores (feeding on both plants and animals). Uniquely among mammals, multituberculates employed a backward chewing stroke which resulted in the masticatory muscles—the muscles which move the mandible—being inserted more to the front than in other groups (including rodents). Gambaryan and Kielan-Jaworowska reconstructed the masticatory musculature of various multituberculates in 1995, and found that Catopsbaatar and its relatives had very powerful masticatory musculature, due to their high zygomatic arches and large anterior and intermediate zygomatic ridges and coronoid processes. Their powerful incisors, with limited bands of enamel, would have been well adapted to gnawing and to cutting hard seeds (similar to rodents). Since it was larger than some other multituberculates, Catopsbaatar would have to open its mouth only 25 degrees to crush hard seeds 12–14 mm (0.47–0.55 in) in diameter; a 40-degree gape would have caused dislocation. After the incisors cut, the premolars and molars would begin to grind with a "power stroke".

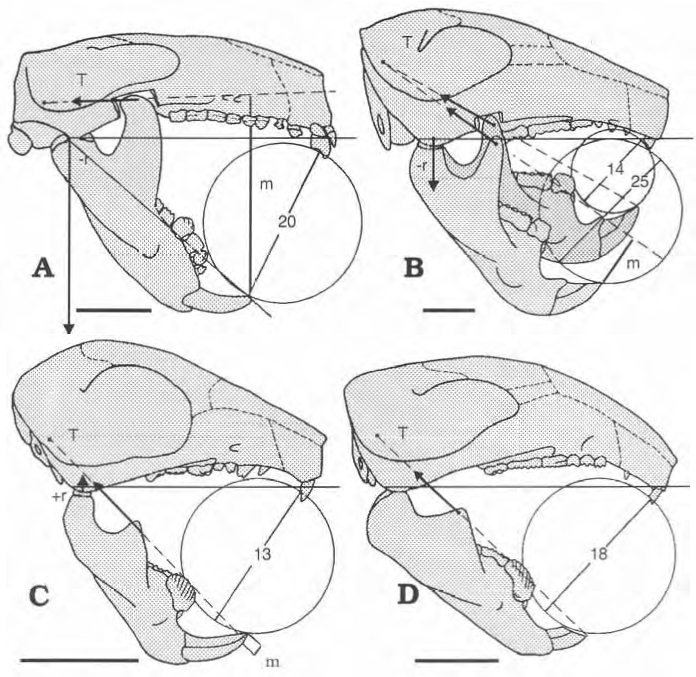
Slicing-crushing action in multituberculates; B is Catopsbaatar

According to Gambaryan and Kielan-Jaworowska, the adaptation for crushing hard seeds sometimes—as in Catopsbaatar—opposed the benefit of a low condylar process (which discourages mandibular dislocation). The anterior and intermediate zygomatic ridges of the skull were the origin of the superficial masseter muscle, which facilitates chewing. The separation of the origin of this muscle into two parts and the rounded muscle scars left by them are unique among mammals to multituberculates. The masticatory muscles of multituberculates independently evolved features shared with rodents and small herbivorous marsupials. As with rodents, multituberculates may have been capable of bilateral mastication—where both rows of teeth in the mandible perform the same function simultaneously—and unilateral mastication (where the rows on one side are used).

=== Posture and locomotion ===
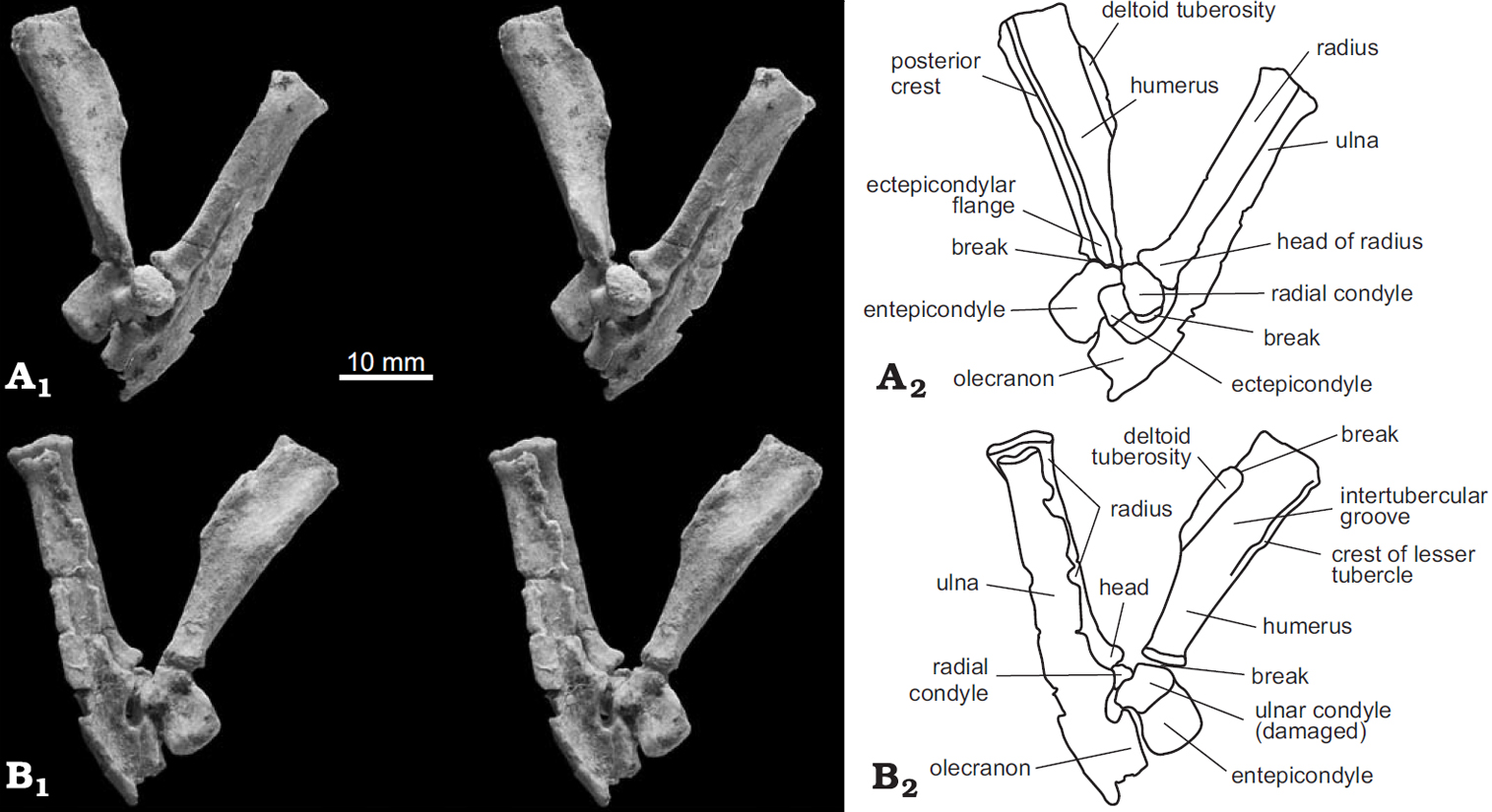
Stereo photos and diagrams of PM120/107's arm bones

The limb posture of multituberculates has been debated. According to some researchers, they employed a parasagittal stance with the erect limbs under the body; others consider a sprawling stance more likely. Kielan-Jaworowska and Hurum supported the latter theory in 2006 based on the presence of hind-leg spurs, a feature they considered present only in sprawling mammals. They pointed out that all early mammals preserved in lacustrine (lake) deposits were compressed from top to bottom, suggesting a sprawling stance, whereas later mammals were preserved on their flanks. Earlier arguments for a sprawling stance include deep pelvises and features of the legs. They also suggested that the feet of multituberculates would have been plantigrade (the sole touching the ground) at rest, but digitigrade (the sole not touching the ground) when jumping and running quickly; they dismissed the idea that the forelimbs of multituberculates and other early mammals were more parasagittal than their hindlimbs. Kielan-Jaworowska and Hurum depicted Catopsbaatar with plantigrade, sprawling legs, with mobile spurs which pointed inward when preparing for attack.

In 2008, Kielan-Jaworowska and Hurum suggested that the long spinous process on a Catopsbaatar vertebra and the long transverse processes in Nemegtbaatar may indicate that some multituberculates were saltatorial (had the ability to jump). Catopsbaatar probably had strong muscles attaching to the tuber calcanei, which further supports the jumping hypothesis. Although it has been suggested that multituberculates were arboreal (lived in trees), most Asian taxa were probably terrestrial; some others were fossorial, digging and living underground.

== Palaeoenvironment ==
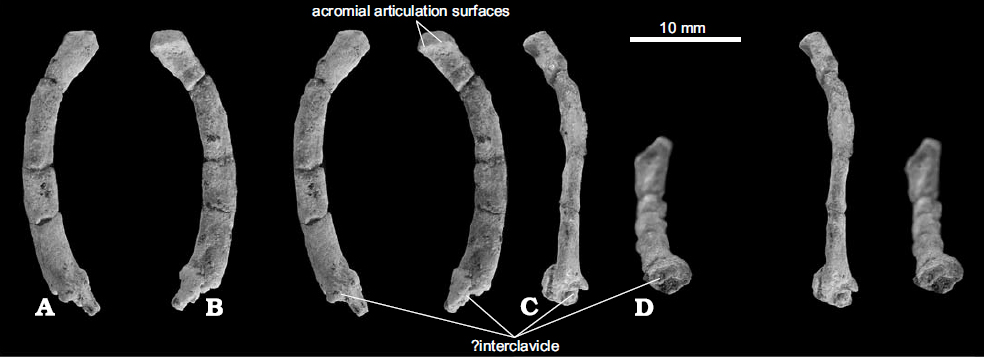
Stereo photos of a clavicle and possible interclavicle of PM120/107

All specimens of Catopsbaatar are known from the Barun Goyot Formation of the Gobi Desert, which probably dates to the late Campanian age of the Late Cretaceous epoch (about 72 million years ago). The specimens were discovered in the Red Beds of Hermiin Tsav area except for one molar from Khulsan. When Catopsbaatar was discovered, the Red Beds of Hermiin Tsav area was thought to be a distinct formation coeval (of the same geological age) with the Barun Goyot Formation, as they contain many of the same animals, but is now thought to correspond to different levels of the Barun Goyot and Nemegt formations. The rock facies of the Red Beds of Hermiin Tsav area consist of orange-coloured, thick-bedded sandstone, with a thin interbedding of light-coloured silt stones and claystones. The rock facies of the Barun Goyot Formation are considered to be the result of an arid or semi-arid environment, with aeolian (deposited by wind) beds.

Other mammals known from the Red Beds of Hermiin Tsav include the multituberculates Nemegtbaatar, Chulsanbaatar and Nessovbaatar, and the therians Deltatheridium, Asioryctes, and Barunlestes. Dinosaurs include Heyuannia, Velociraptor, Saichania, Platyceratops, Gobiceratops, and some indeterminate theropods. Reptiles include the turtle Mongolemys, the lizards Gobinatus, Tchingisaurus, Prodenteia, Gladidenagama and Phrynosomimus, and an indeterminate crocodile. The frog Gobiates and an indeterminate alexornithiform bird are also known. Ostracods include Limnocythere, Cypridea, and Eucypris.
