= Bayan Mandahu Formation =

Geological formation in China

- Stratigraphic range: Campanian, 75–71 Ma
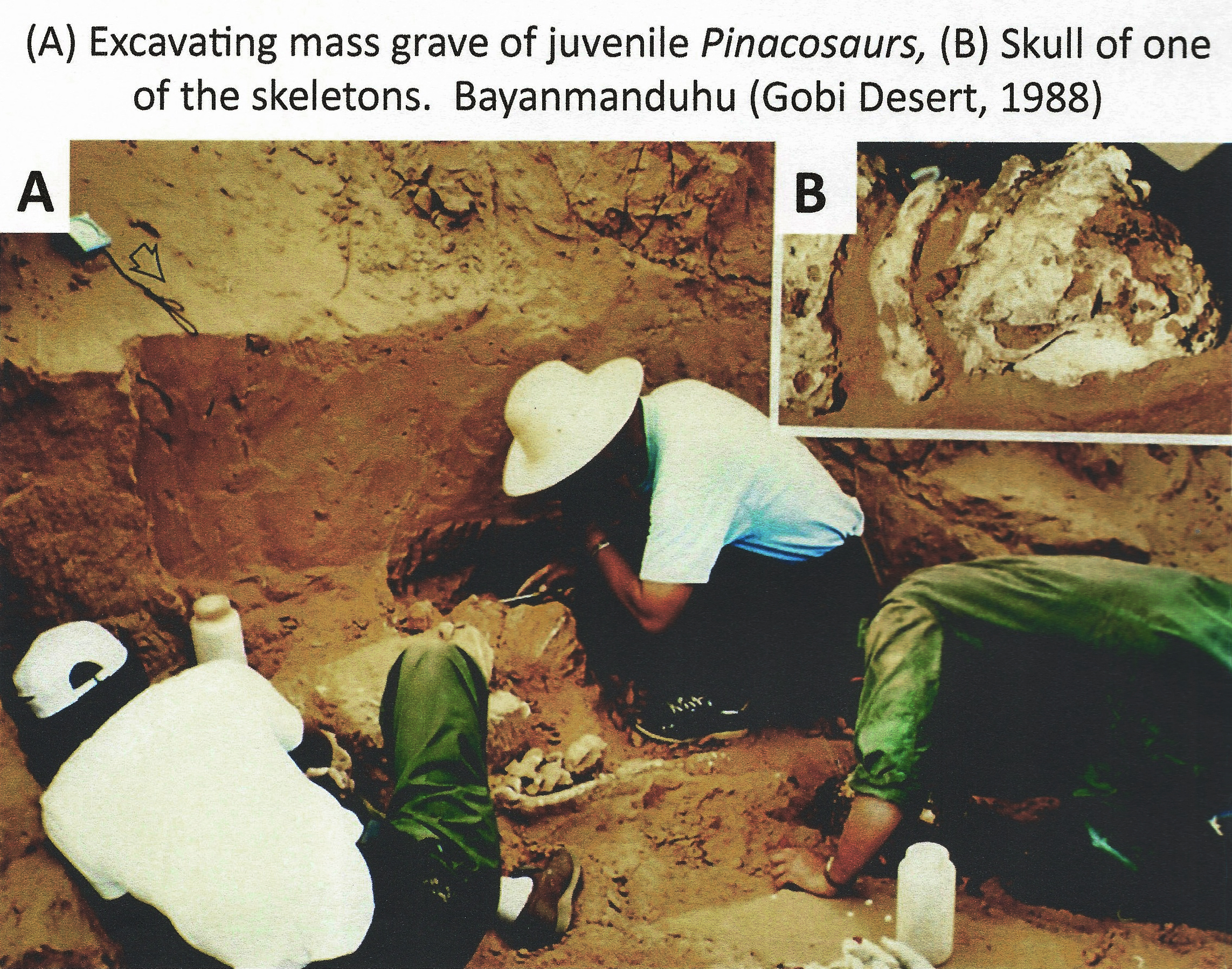
- Type: Geological formation
- Unit of: Gobi Desert

Lithology
- Primary: Sandstone

Location
- Coordinates: 41.75°N 106.75°E
- Region: Inner Mongolia
- Country: China

Type section
- Named for: Bayan Mandahu, Urad Rear Banner, Inner Mongolia
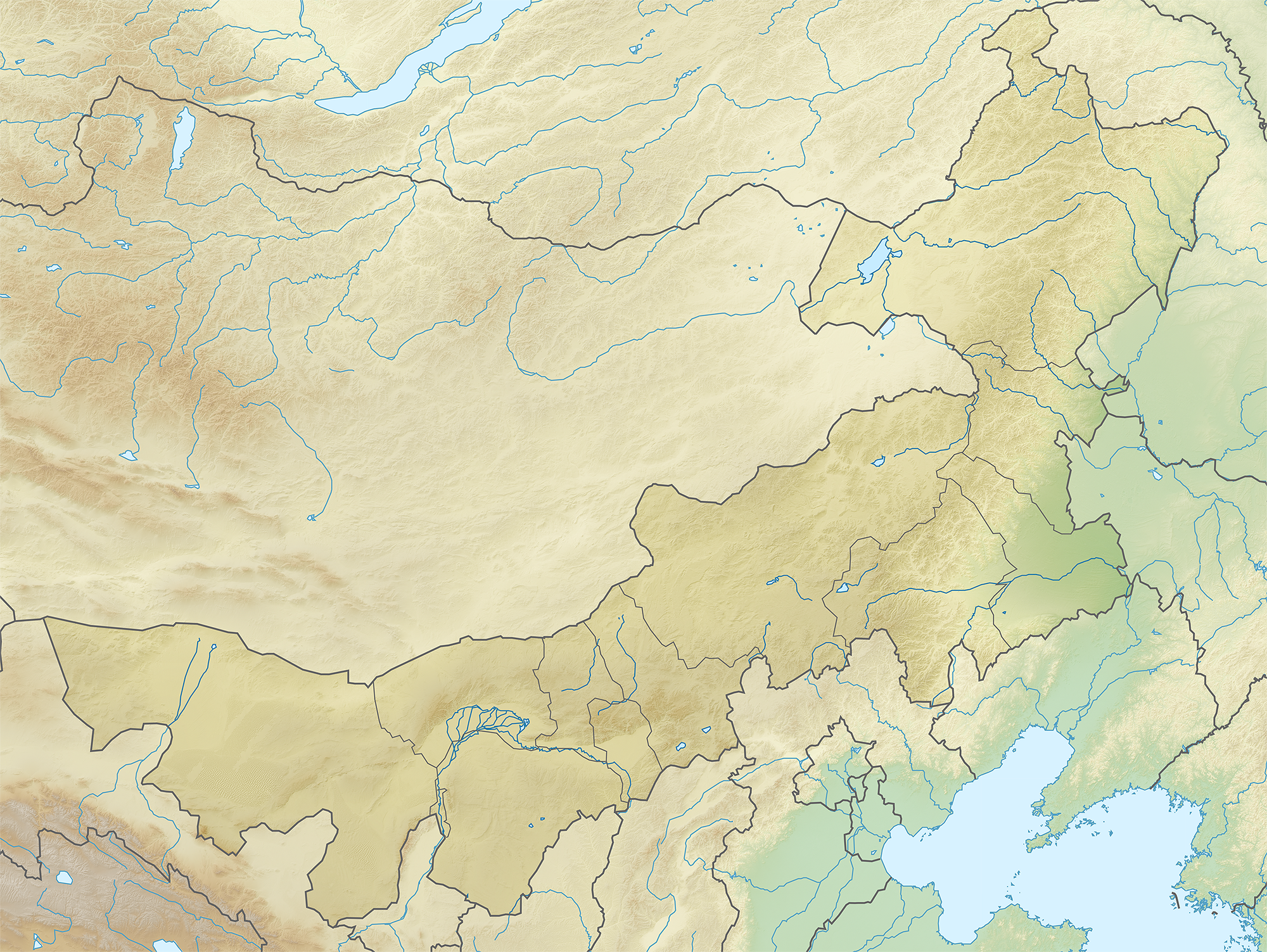
- Bayan Mandahu Formation (China) Bayan Mandahu Formation (Inner Mongolia)

The Bayan Mandahu Formation (also known as Wulansuhai Formation or Wuliangsuhai Formation) is a geological unit of "redbeds" located near the village of Bayan Mandahu in Inner Mongolia, China, in the Gobi Desert. It dates from the Late Cretaceous Period. Laid down in the Campanian, it is dated somewhat uncertainly to between 75 and 71 mya (million years ago).

== Description ==
The paleoenvironment it preserves was semi-arid and characterized by alluvial (stream-deposited) and eolian (wind-deposited) sediments. The formation is known for its vertebrate fossils, most of which are preserved in unstructured sandstone, indicating burial by wind-blown sandstorms.

== Paleofauna of the Bayan Mandahu Formation ==
The fauna of the Bayan Mandahu is very similar in composition to the nearby Djadochta Formation, and the two may have been deposited at roughly the same time. These two formations share many of the same genera, but differ in the makeup of species. For example, the most common mammal in the Djadochta is Kryptobaatar dashzevegi, while in the Bayan Mandahu, it is the closely related Kryptobaatar mandahuensis. Similarly, the dinosaur fauna of the Djadochta includes Protoceratops andrewsi and Velociraptor mongoliensis, while the Bayan Mandahu contains Protoceratops hellenikorhinus and Velociraptor osmolskae.

| Color key: Taxon / Reclassified taxon / Taxon falsely reported as present / Dubious taxon or junior synonym / Ichnotaxon / Ootaxon / Morphotaxon | Notes; Uncertain or tentative taxa are in small text; ~~crossed out~~ taxa are discredited. |

=== Crocodylomorphs ===
Crocodylomorphs of the Bayan Mandahu Formation
| Genus | Species | Location | Material | Notes | Images |
|---|---|---|---|---|---|
| Shamosuchus | | | | A mesoeucrocodylian. | |

=== Lizards ===
An amphisbaenian species is known from the formation. An iguanian species is known from the formation.

Lizards of the Bayan Mandahu Formation
| Genus | Species | Location | Material | Notes | Images |
|---|---|---|---|---|---|
| Adamisaurus | A. magnidentatus | | | An agamid. | |
| Bainguis | | | | A diploglossan. | |
| Telmasaurus | | | | A monitor lizard. | |

=== Turtles ===
Turtles of the Bayan Mandahu Formation
| Genus | Species | Location | Material | Notes | Images |
|---|---|---|---|---|---|
| Basilemys | | | | A softshell turtle. | |
| "Zangerlia" | "Z." neimongolensis | Bayan Mandahu | "Partial to complete skeletons of multiple individuals." | A nanhsiungchelyid. | |

=== Mammals ===
A taeniolabidoidea multituberculate is known from the formation.

Mammals of the Bayan Mandahu Formation
| Genus | Species | Location | Material | Notes | Images |
|---|---|---|---|---|---|
| Guibaatar | G. castellanus | | | A djadochtatheriid multituberculate. | |
| Kennalestes | K. gobiensis | | | A placental. Also present in the Djadochta Formation. | |
| Kryptobaatar | K. mandahuensis | | | A multituberculate. | |

=== Dinosaurs ===
==== Alvarezsaurs ====
| Genus | Species | Location | Material | Notes | Images |
|---|---|---|---|---|---|
| Alvarezsauridae indet. | Indeterminate | Bayan Mandahu | An articulated series of partial anterior cervical vertebrae, an anterior cervical vertebra, isolated fragmentary anterior caudal vertebrae, a partial scapula, and pedal phalanges. | An unnamed parvicursorine alvarezsaurid. | |
| Linhenykus | L. monodactylus | Wuliangsuhai | Cervical vertebrae, dorsal vertebrae, sacral vertebrae, caudal vertebrae, a scapulocoracoid, a sternum, much of the forelimbs, a partial pelvis, nearly complete hindlimbs, and some unidentified fragments. | A monodactyl parvicursorine alvarezsaurid. | |

==== Ankylosaurs ====
| Genus | Species | Location | Material | Notes | Images |
|---|---|---|---|---|---|
| Pinacosaurus | P. grangeri | Bayan Mandahu | [Four] juvenile specimens consisting of skulls, manidibles, cervical half-rings and almost complete skeletons, and an incomplete subadult skull. | A basal ankylosaurine ankylosaurid also known from the Djadochta Formation. | |
| Pinacosaurus | P. hilwitnorum | Bayan Mandahu | | A basal ankylosaurine ankylosaurid also known from the Djadochta Formation. | |
| Eopinacosaurus | E. mephistocephalus | Bayan Mandahu | A nearly complete articulated skeleton, with in situ cervical dermal armour and tail-club, that lies in a natural with limb bones doubled under the body. | A basal ankylosaurine ankylosaurid. | |

==== Birds ====
| Genus | Species | Location | Material | Notes | Images |
|---|---|---|---|---|---|
| cf. Gobipteryx | Indeterminate | | "Eggs similar to those attributed to Gobipteryx minuta from the Djadochta Formation." | | |

==== Ceratopsians ====
| Genus | Species | Location | Material | Notes | Images |
|---|---|---|---|---|---|
| Bagaceratops | B. rozhdestvenskyi | Bayan Mandahu | A partial skull. | A protoceratopsid also known from the Barun Goyot Formation and possibly the Djadochta Formation. | |
| Magnirostris | M. dodsoni | Bayan Mandahu | A partial skull. | A protoceratopsid now considered synonym of Bagaceratops. | |
| Protoceratops | P. hellenikorhinus | Bayan Mandahu | Skulls and sparse body remains from multiple individuals. | A protoceratopsid. | |
| Udanoceratops? | Indeterminate | Bayan Mandahu | "Nearly 1 meter long skull." | A giant leptoceratopsid. Reported remains probably represent Protoceratops hellenikorhinus. | |

==== Dromaeosaurs ====
| Genus | Species | Location | Material | Notes | Images |
|---|---|---|---|---|---|
| Linheraptor | L. exquisitus | Wuliangsuhai | A skull, cervical vertebrae, caudal vertebrae, a scapula, a humerus, a radius, metacarpals, manual phalanxes, sternal plate, a pubis, a femur, a tibiotarsus, metatarsals, and pedal phalanxes. | A velociraptorine dromaeosaurid. | |
| Velociraptor | V. osmolskae | Bayan Mandahu | A paired maxillae and left lacrimal. | A velociraptorine dromaeosaurid. | |

==== Hadrosaurs ====
| Genus | Species | Location | Material | Notes | Images |
|---|---|---|---|---|---|
| Undescribed Hadrosauridae | Indeterminate | Bayan Mandahu | | A hadrosaurid. | |

==== Oviraptorosaurs ====
| Genus | Species | Location | Material | Notes | Images |
|---|---|---|---|---|---|
| Machairasaurus | M. leptonychus | Bayan Mandahu | A nearly complete articulated right forearm and manus, pedal phalanges, manual phalanges, caudal vertebrae, dorsal ribs, chevrons, and fragments of metatarsals III and IV. | A heyuanniine oviraptorid. | |
| Oviraptoridae indet. | Indeterminate | Bayan Mandahu | "Partial individual sitting atop an egg clutch." | An oviraptorid that represent the second nesting oviraptorid. Sometimes referred to Machairasaurus. | |
| Wulatelong | W. gobiensis | Wuliangsuhai | A partial skull, dorsal vertebrae, caudal vertebrae, partial scapulocoracoids, a partial sternum, a partial humerus, an incomplete manus, a nearly complete pelvic girdle, and the right hindlimb. | A basal oviraptorid oviraptorosaur. | |

==== Sauropods ====
| Genus | Species | Location | Material | Notes | Images |
|---|---|---|---|---|---|
| Undescribed Sauropoda | Indeterminate | Bayan Mandahu | | A sauropod. | |

==== Troodontids ====
| Genus | Species | Location | Material | Notes | Images |
|---|---|---|---|---|---|
| Linhevenator | L. tani | Wuliangsuhai | A skull and mandible, anterior dorsal vertebrae, middle dorsal vertebrae, a scapula, a humerus, incomplete ischia, a femur, nearly complete pes, and other fragmentary bones. | A troodontid with short forearms. | |
| Papiliovenator | P. neimengguensis | Bayan Mandahu | An almost complete skull, cervical vertebrae, anterior dorsal vertebrae, partial scapulae, partial coracoid, fragmentary pelvic girdle, partial humeri, ulna, radius, partial manus, femur, tibia, fibula, pes, and a pedal phalanx II-3. | A troodontid that is part of a clade that includes all other Late Cretaceous troodontids except Almas. | |
| Philovenator | P. curriei | Wuliangsuhai | A nearly complete femur, a partial tibia, a partial fibula, astragalus-calcaneum complex, distal tarsals, metatarsals, and pedal phalanges. | A troodontid. | |

==== Tyrannosaurs ====
| Genus | Species | Location | Material | Notes | Images |
|---|---|---|---|---|---|
| Undescribed Tyrannosauridae | Indeterminate | Bayan Mandahu | | A tyrannosaurid. | |

== See also ==
- Barun Goyot Formation
- List of fossil sites (with link directory)
- Nemegt Formation
- List of dinosaur-bearing rock formations
