= Camurodon =

Camurodon Temporal range: Late Cretaceous (Campanian), 72.9–72.7 Ma

Scientific classification
- Kingdom: Animalia
- Phylum: Chordata
- Class: Mammalia
- Order: †Multituberculata
- Family: †Cimolomyidae
- Genus: †Camurodon; Shelley et al., 2026
- Species: †C. borealis

Binomial name
- †Camurodon borealis Shelley et al., 2026

Genus of multituberculate mammal

Camurodon (kah-MUR-oh-don; lit. 'curved tooth') is an extinct genus of multituberculate mammal known from the Late Cretaceous (Campanian age) Prince Creek Formation of Alaska, United States. The genus contains a single species, Camurodon borealis, known from four isolated teeth. It is assigned to the family Cimolomyidae, with other multuberculates from the same locality represented by Kaniqsiqcosmodon (Microcosmodontidae) and Qayaqgruk (Djadochtatheriidae).

== Discovery and naming ==
The Camurodon fossil material was discovered at 'Pediomys Point', a locality along the Colville River in northern Alaska, United States, representing outcrops of the Prince Creek Formation. Four teeth have been assigned to this taxon: a lower right premolar (P_{4}), two partial premolars, and an upper left molar. The first of these is housed in the Perot Museum of Nature and Science in Dallas, Texas, and accessioned as specimen DMNH 21350. The remaining teeth are housed the Earth Sciences Collection at the University of Alaska Museum of the North, and catalogued as specimens UAMES 34402, 34484, and 54029, respectively.

In 2026, Sarah L. Shelley and colleagues described Camurodon borealis as a new genus and species of multituberculate mammal based on these fossil remains, establishing DMNH 21350 as the holotype specimen. The generic name, Camurodon, combines the Latin word camur, meaning 'bent' or 'curved', with the Greek word ὀδών (odṓn), meaning 'tooth', referencing the distinctive shape of its premolars. The specific name, borealis, is a Latin word meaning 'northern', alluding to the Arctic range of the species. The intended meaning of the full binomial name is 'Northern curved-tooth'.

== Palaeobiology ==
=== Diet ===
The morphology of the teeth of Camurodon indicates that the animal was herbivorous.
