= Kaniqsiqcosmodon =

Kaniqsiqcosmodon Temporal range: Late Cretaceous (Campanian), 72.9–72.7 Ma

Scientific classification
- Kingdom: Animalia
- Phylum: Chordata
- Class: Mammalia
- Order: †Multituberculata
- Family: †Microcosmodontidae
- Genus: †Kaniqsiqcosmodon; Shelley et al., 2026
- Species: †K. polaris

Binomial name
- †Kaniqsiqcosmodon polaris Shelley et al., 2026

Genus of multituberculate mammal

Kaniqsiqcosmodon (kah-NIK-sik-kaws-moh-don; lit. 'frost ornamented tooth') is an extinct genus of multituberculate mammal known from the Late Cretaceous (Campanian age) Prince Creek Formation of Alaska, United States. The genus contains a single species, Kaniqsiqcosmodon polaris, known from two isolated teeth. It is assigned to the family Microcosmodontidae, with other multuberculates from the same locality represented by Camurodon (Cimolomyidae) and Qayaqgruk (Djadochtatheriidae).

== Discovery and naming ==
The Kaniqsiqcosmodon fossil material was discovered at the 'OJsaurus bone bed', a locality along the Colville River in northern Alaska, United States, representing outcrops of the Prince Creek Formation. Two specimens are known, an upper and lower left premolar, which are housed in the Earth Sciences Collection at the University of Alaska Museum of the North, where they are permanently accessioned as specimens UAMES 35332 and 35304, respectively.

In 2026, Sarah L. Shelley and colleagues described Kaniqsiqcosmodon polaris as a new genus and species of multituberculate mammal based on these fossil remains, establishing UAMES 35304 as the holotype specimen. The generic name, Kaniqsiqcosmodon, combines the Iñupiaq word kaniqsiq, meaning 'frost', with the Greek words κόσμος (kósmos), meaning 'ornamented', and ὀδών (odṓn), meaning 'tooth'. The suffix '-cosmodon' was chosen to parallel the genus names of its close relatives in the family Microcosmodontidae, such as Microcosmodon and Pentacosmodon.The specific name, polaris, is a Latin word meaning 'of the pole', alluding to the species' Arctic habitat. The intended meaning of the full binomial name is 'polar frost ornamented tooth'.

== Palaeobiology ==
=== Diet ===
The morphology of the teeth of Kaniqsiqcosmodon suggests that it was omnivorous, but with its diet strongly leaning towards consumption of plants.
