= Guibaatar =

Guibaatar Temporal range: Campanian

Scientific classification
- Kingdom: Animalia
- Phylum: Chordata
- Class: Mammalia
- Order: †Multituberculata
- Family: †Djadochtatheriidae
- Genus: †Guibaatar
- Species: †G. castellanus

Binomial name
- †Guibaatar castellanus Wible et al., 2019

Extinct genus of mammals

Guibaatar is an extinct genus of mammal that lived in Inner Mongolia during the Late Cretaceous epoch. It contains a single species, G. castellanus.
