= Qayaqgruk =

Qayaqgruk Temporal range: Late Cretaceous (Campanian), 72.9–72.7 Ma

Scientific classification
- Kingdom: Animalia
- Phylum: Chordata
- Class: Mammalia
- Order: †Multituberculata
- Family: †Djadochtatheriidae
- Genus: †Qayaqgruk; Shelley et al., 2026
- Species: †Q. peregrinus

Binomial name
- †Qayaqgruk peregrinus Shelley et al., 2026

Genus of multituberculate mammal

Qayaqgruk (ky-AK-gruk; lit. 'little Qayaq') is an extinct monotypic genus of multituberculate mammal known from the Late Cretaceous (Campanian age) Prince Creek Formation of Alaska, United States. The genus contains a single species, Qayaqgruk peregrinus, known from an isolated tooth. It is assigned to the family Djadochtatheriidae, with other multuberculates from the same locality represented by Camurodon (Cimolomyidae) and Kaniqsiqcosmodon (Microcosmodontidae).

== Discovery and naming ==
The Qayaqgruk fossil material was discovered at 'Pediomys Point', a locality along the Colville River in northern Alaska, United States, representing outcrops of the Prince Creek Formation. The only known specimen, a single left premolar (P4), is housed in the Earth Sciences Collection at the University of Alaska Museum of the North, where it is permanently accessioned as specimen UAMES 34483.

In 2026, Sarah L. Shelley and colleagues described Qayaqgruk peregrinus as a new genus and species of multituberculate mammal based on these fossil remains, establishing UAMES 34483 as the holotype specimen. The generic name, Qayaqgruk, combines a reference to Qayaq, a hero wanderer of Iñupiaq legend, with the Iñupiaq suffix -gruk, which can be used to suggest a smaller form of something. This name was chosen to parallel the Mongolian suffix -baatar, meaning 'hero', often used in the genus names of Asian (and elsewhere) multituberculates. The specific name, peregrinus, is a Latin word meaning 'traveller' or 'wanderer', reiterating the storied journeys of Qayaq, as well as the affinities of this species to the otherwise entirely Asian clade Djadochtatheriidae. The intended meaning of the full binomial name is 'the little wandering Qayaq (hero)'.

== Palaeobiology ==
=== Diet ===
Based on the dental morphology of the taxon, Qayaqgruk was most likely a generalist omnivore that consumed both insects and plant matter as part of its diet.
