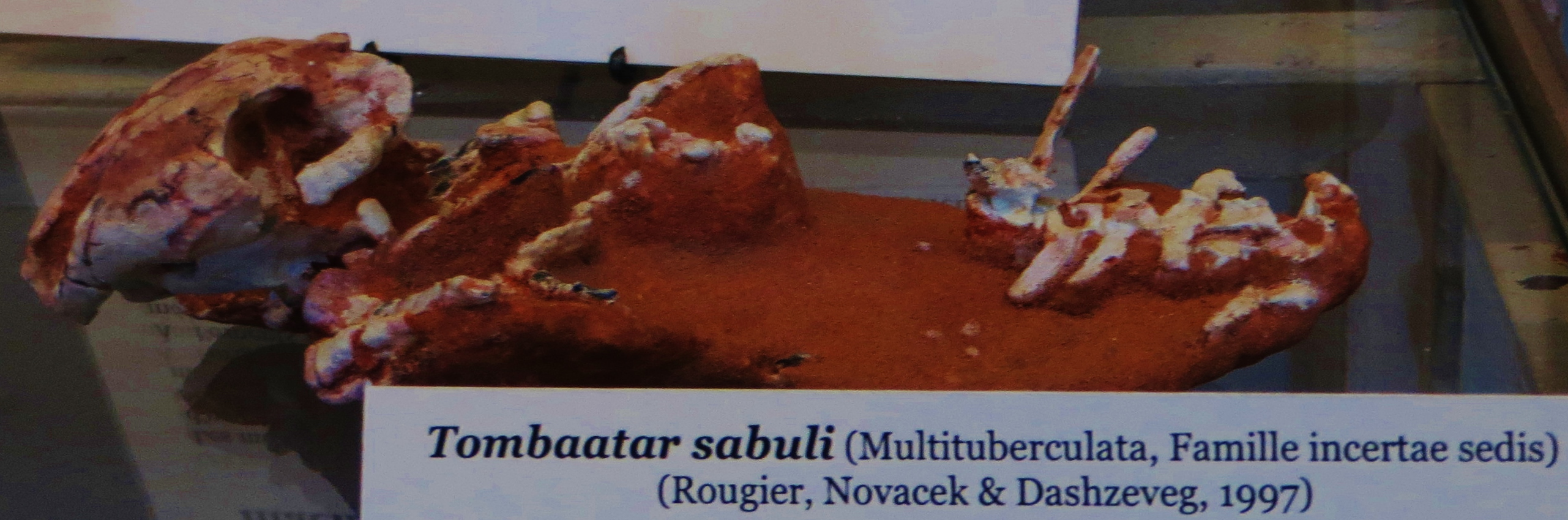
- Fossil

Scientific classification
- Domain: Eukaryota
- Kingdom: Animalia
- Phylum: Chordata
- Class: Mammalia
- Order: †Multituberculata
- Family: †Djadochtatheriidae
- Genus: †Tombaatar; Rougier G.W., Novacek M. & Dashzeveg D., 1997
- Species: †T. sabuli

Binomial name
- †Tombaatar sabuli Rougier G.W., Novacek M. & Dashzeveg D., 1997

= Tombaatar =

Tombaatar Temporal range: Late Cretaceous

Genus of mammals

Tombaatar is a mammal genus that existed during the Mongolian Upper Cretaceous period. It co-existed with some of the late dinosaurs. This animal was a member of the extinct order Multituberculata, within the suborder Cimolodonta and family Djadochtatheriidae. The genus Tombaatar was named by Rougier G.W., Novacek M. and Dashzeveg D. in 1997.

The species Tombaatar sabuli is known from remains found in the Upper Cretaceous Djadokhta Formation of Ukhaa Tolgod, Mongolia. Tombaatar was a relatively large multituberculate. The skull is about 6 cm in length.
