= Gobiates =

Gobiates Temporal range: Aptian–Maastrichtian

Scientific classification
- Kingdom: Animalia
- Phylum: Chordata
- Class: Amphibia
- Order: Anura
- Family: †Gobiatidae
- Genus: †Gobiates; Špinar and Tatarinov, 1986

Type species
- †Gobiates khermeentsavi Špinar and Tatarinov, 1986

Extinct genus of frogs

Gobiates is an extinct genus of frogs. Fossils have been found in the Barun Goyot, Djadokhta, and Nemegt formations of Mongolia, the Bissekty Formation of Uzbekistan and the Paluxy and Twin Mountains Formations of Texas in the south-western United States. The following species are recognized:

- G. asiaticus
- G. bogatchovi
- G. dzhyrakudukensis
- G. fritschi
- G. furcatus
- G. khermeentsavi
- G. kizylkumensis
- G. leptocolaptus
- G. sosedkoi
- G. spinari
- G. tatarinovi

== See also ==
- List of prehistoric amphibians
