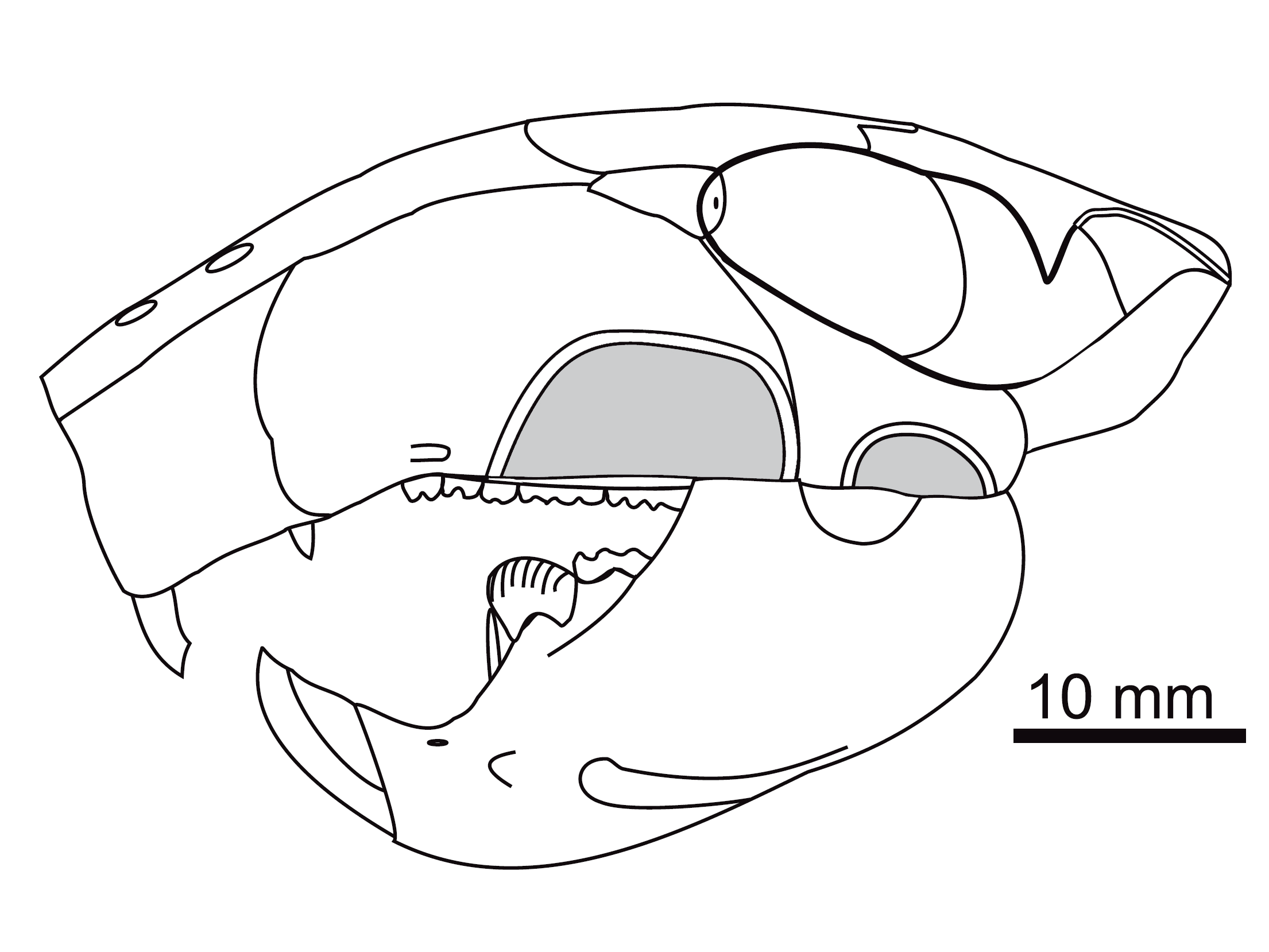
- Skull of Djadochtatherium

Scientific classification
- Domain: Eukaryota
- Kingdom: Animalia
- Phylum: Chordata
- Class: Mammalia
- Order: †Multituberculata
- Family: †Djadochtatheriidae
- Genus: †Djadochtatherium

Species
- D. matthewi

= Djadochtatherium =

Djadochtatherium Temporal range: Late Cretaceous

Extinct family of mammals

Djadochtatherium is a mammal genus that lived in Mongolia during the Upper Cretaceous. It coexisted with some of the late dinosaurs. This animal was a member of the extinct order of Multituberculata. It is within the suborder of Cimolodonta, and a member of the family Djadochtatheriidae. It was named by G. G. Simpson in 1925, the name meaning "Djadokhta beast".

The species Djadochtatherium matthewi was also named by G. G. Simpson in 1925 and has also been known as Catopsalis matthewi (Simpson, 1925). It has been found in the Campanian (Upper Cretaceous)-age Djadokhta and Goyot Formations of Mongolia. This was a relatively large Multituberculate, with a skull length of about 4.5 cm. It was originally diagnosed as a species within the North American genus of Catopsalis.
