= Djadochtatheriidae =

Djadochtatheriidae Temporal range: Late Cretaceous
- Comparison between the skulls of Kryptobaatar (A), Djadochtatherium (B), and Catopsbaatar (C)

Scientific classification
- Kingdom: Animalia
- Phylum: Chordata
- Class: Mammalia
- Order: †Multituberculata
- Superfamily: †Djadochtatherioidea
- Family: †Djadochtatheriidae; Zofia Kielan-Jaworowska and Jørn Hurum, 1997

Genera
- †Djadochtatherium; †Catopsbaatar; †Guibaatar; †Kryptobaatar; †Mangasbaatar; †Qayaqgruk; †Tombaatar

Extinct family of mammals

Djadochtatheriidae is a family of fossil mammals within the extinct order Multituberculata. Remains are known from the Upper Cretaceous of Central Asia. These animals lived during the Mesozoic, also known as the "age of the dinosaurs". This family is part of the suborder of Cimolodonta. The taxon Djadochtatheriidae was named by Zofia Kielan-Jaworowska and Jørn Hurum in 1997.

Multituberculates are a rather diverse group in terms of locomotion and diet. Forms like Kryptobaatar and Catopsbaatar were hopping, jerboa-like omnivores (and this is probably the ancestral condition for the group, given that Nemegtbaatar also had this lifestyle), while Mangasbaatar was a robust, digging herbivore.
