= 1984 in paleontology =

Paleontology or palaeontology is the study of prehistoric life forms on Earth through the examination of plant and animal fossils. This includes the study of body fossils, tracks (ichnites), burrows, cast-off parts, fossilised feces (coprolites), palynomorphs and chemical residues. Because humans have encountered fossils for millennia, paleontology has a long history both before and after becoming formalized as a science. This article records significant discoveries and events related to paleontology that occurred or were published in the year 1984.

== Angiosperms ==
Name	Novelty	Status	Authors	Age	Unit	Location	Notes	Images
Hooleya lata	Sp nov	Valid	Wing	Eocene	Clarno Formation	USA; Oregon	A Platycaryeae fruit morphospecies.	
Platycarya bognorensis	Comb nov	valid	(Chandler) Wing & Hickey	Eocene	London Clay	UK; England	Moved from Pterocaryopsis bognorensis (1961); Pterocaryopsis elliptica (1978) synonymized in.	
Platycarya castaneopsis	Comb nov	valid	(Lesquereux) Wing & Hickey	Ypresian	Green River Formation	USA; Colorado	Moved from Quercus castaneopsis (1883)	
Platycarya manchesterii	Sp nov	valid	Wing & Hickey	Eocene	Clarno Formation	USA; Oregon	A Platycarya fruit morphospecies.	

== Arthropods ==
=== Arachnids ===
Name	Novelty	Status	Authors	Age	Unit	Location	Notes	Images
Selenops beynai	Sp nov	Valid	Schawaller	Burdigalian	Dominican amber	Dominican Republic	A selenopid wall spider	Selenops beynai

=== Newly named crustaceans ===
Name	Novelty	Status	Authors	Age	Unit	Location	Notes	Images
Gorgonophontes	Gen et sp nov	Valid	Schram	Kasimovian	Swope Formation; Dennis Formation; Oread Formation	US (Nebraska; Iowa)	A mantis shrimp, type species is G. peleron	Gorgonophontes
Peachocaris acanthouraea	Sp nov	Valid	Schram	Upper Pennsylvanian	Swope Formation	US (Nebraska; Iowa)	A lophogastrid	
Pseudarmadillo cristatus	Sp nov	Valid	Schmalfuss	Burdigalian	Dominican amber	Dominican Republic	A delatorreid isopod	
Pseudarmadillo tuberculatus	Sp nov	Valid	Schmalfuss	Burdigalian	Dominican amber	Dominican Republic	A delatorreid isopod	

=== Newly named eurypterids ===
Name	Novelty	Status	Authors	Age	Unit	Location	Notes	Images
Mycterops whitei	Sp nov	Valid	Schram	Kasimovian	Swope Formation	US (Nebraska; Iowa)	A mycteroptid	

== Conodont paleozoology ==
Willi Ziegler and Charles A. Sandberg described the conodont genus Alternognathus.

== Archosauromorphs ==
=== Newly named archosauromorphs ===
Name	Novelty	Status	Authors	Age	Unit	Location	Notes	Images
Technosaurus	Gen et sp nov	Valid	Chatterjee	Norian	Bull Canyon Formation	USA (Texas)	Originally described as a fabrosaurid; now Archosauriformes incertae sedis	

=== Newly named dinosaurs ===
Data courtesy of George Olshevsky's dinosaur genera list.

Name	Novelty	Status	Authors	Age	Unit	Location	Notes	Images
Chuandongocoelurus		Valid	He	Middle Jurassic	Lower Shaximiao Formation	China	A tetanuran theropod	
Datousaurus	Gen et sp nov	Valid	Dong & Tang	Middle Jurassic	Lower Shaximiao Formation	China	A Mamenchisaurid sauropod	Datousaurus
Harpymimus	Fam., gen et sp nov	Valid	Barsbold & Perle	Hauterivian to Barremian	Shinekhudug Formation	Mongolia	An ornithomimosaurian	Harpymimus
Kaijiangosaurus	Gen et sp nov	Valid	He	Middle Jurassic	Xiashaximiao Formation	China	A tetanuran theropod	
Liliensternus	Gen nov	Valid	Welles	Norian	Trossingen Formation	Germany	A coelophysoid	Liliensternus
Longosaurus	Gen nov	Jr. synonym of Coelophysis.	Welles					
Xuanhanosaurus	Gen et sp nov	Valid	Dong	Middle Jurassic	Lower Shaximiao Formation	China	A megalosauroid. Before it was believed that this animal was a quadruped, but now it is known that this was a biped.	

=== Newly named birds ===
Name	Status	Novelty	Authors	Age	Unit	Location	Notes	Images
Anser thraceiensis	Valid	Sp. nov.	Nikolay I. Burchak-Abramovich Ivan M. Nikolov	Late Miocene or Early Pliocene	MN 11-15	Bulgaria	An Anatidae.	
Archaeopteryx recurva	Disputed	Sp. nov.	Michael E. Howgate	Late Jura	Portlandian	Germany: Bavaria	An Archaeopterygidae, the 5th specimen, this species becomes the type species of the new genus Jurapteryx Howgate, 1985.	
Bubo leakeyae	Valid	Gen. nov. et Sp. nov.	Pierce Brodkorb Cécile Mourer-Chauviré	Holocene	Olduvai Gorge	Tanzania	A Strigidae.	
Cursoricoccyx geraldinae	Valid	Gen. nov. et Sp. nov.	Larry D. Martin Robert M. Mengel	Early Miocene	Pawnee Creek Formation	: USA Colorado	A Cuculiformes, Neomorphidae, this is the type species of the new genus.	
Cygnopterus alphonsi	Valid	Sp. nov.	Jacques Cheneval	Early Miocene	MN 2a	France	An Anatidae.	
Dromaius baudinianus	Valid	Sp. nov.	Shane A. Parker	Holocene	Kangaroo Island	Australia: South Australia	A Dromaiidae.	
Eocypselus vincenti	Valid	Gen. nov. et Sp. nov.	Colin J. O. Harrison	Early Eocene	MP 8	UK: England	An Apodiformes, Eocypselidae Harrison, 1984, this is the type species of the new genus.	
Fulmarus miocaenus	Valid	Sp. nov.	Hildegarde Howard	Middle Miocene	Round Mountain Silt, Barstovian	USA: California	A Procellariidae.	
Gansus yumenensis	Valid	Gen. nov. et Sp. nov.	Hou Lianhai Liu Zhicheng	Early Cretaceous	Xiagou Formation	China	An Ornithuromorphae Chiappe, Ji, Ji et Norell, 1999, Gansuiformes Hou et Liu, 1984, Gansuidae Hou et Liu, 1984, this is the type species of the new genus.	
Gavia moldavica	Valid	Sp. nov.	Jenö Kessler	Late Miocene; Early Pliocene	MN 9?	Romania; Moldova; USA: Florida	A Gaviidae.	
Kizylkumavis cretacea	Valid	Gen. nov. et Sp. nov.	Lev A. Nessov	Late Cretaceous	Late Turonian-Coniacian	USSR: Uzbekistan	An Enantiornithes Walker, 1981, Alexornithiformes, Brodkorb, 1976, Alexornithidae Brodkorb, 1976, Alexornithinae Brodkorb, 1976, this is the type species of the new genus.	
Larus udabnensis	Valid	Sp. nov.	Nikolay I. Burchak-Abramovich E. G. Gabashvili	Late Miocene		USSR: Georgia	A Laridae.	
Mioaegypius gui	Valid	Gen. nov. et Sp. nov.	Hou LianHai	Middle Miocene	Xiacaowan Formation	China	An Accipitridae, this is the type species of the new genus.	
Otus guildayi	Valid	Sp. nov.	Pierce Brodkorb Cécile Mourer-Chauviré	Pleistocene	Cave deposits	USA: Maryland	A Strigidae.	
Parahesperornis alexi	Valid	Gen. nov. et Sp. nov.	Larry D. Martin	Late Cretaceous	Niobrara Chalk Formation	USA: Kansas	A Hesperornithiformes Fürbringer, 1888, Hesperornithidae Marsh, 1872, this is the type species of the new genus.	
Parvirallus bassetti	Valid	Sp. nov.	Colin J. O. Harrison	Early Eocene	MP 8-9	UK: England	A Rallidae.	
Parvirallus gassoni	Valid	Sp. nov.	Colin J. O. Harrison	Early Eocene	MP 8-9	UK: England	A Rallidae.	
Parvirallus medius	Valid	Sp. nov.	Colin J. O. Harrison	Early Eocene	MP 8-9	UK: England	A Rallidae.	
Pediorallus hookeri	Valid	Sp. nov.	Colin J. O. Harrison	Early Eocene	Ypresian, London Clay B MP 8-9	UK: England	Described as a Rallidae, transferred to the genus Lithornis Owen, 1840 by Houde, 1988, a Palaeognathae, Lithornithiformes Houde, 1988, Lithornithidae Houde, 1988.	
Pediorallus nasi	Valid	Sp. nov.	Colin J. O. Harrison	Early Eocene	Ypresian, London Clay A MP 8	UK: England	Described as a Rallidae, transferred to the genus Lithornis Owen, 1840 by Houde, 1988, a Palaeognathae, Lithornithiformes Houde, 1988, Lithornithidae Houde, 1988.	
Phalacrocorax owrei	Valid	Sp. nov.	Pierce Brodkorb Cécile Mourer-Chauviré	Pleistocene	Douglas Leakey Korongo	Tanzania	A Phalacrocoracidae.	
Phalacrocorax serdicensis	Valid ?	Sp. nov.	Nikolay I. Burchak-Abramovich Ivan M. Nikolov	Late Miocene	MN 11-13	Bulgaria	A Phalacrocoracidae, possibly a synonym of Phalacrocorax aristotelis.	
Phasianus yanshansis	Valid	Sp. nov.	Huang Wanpo Hou Lianhai	Holocene	Cave deposits	China	A Phasianidae.	
Podiceps miocenicus	Valid	Sp. nov.	Jenö Kessler	Late Miocene	MN 9	Romania; Moldova	A Podicipedidae.	
Scaniacypselus wardi	Valid	Gen. nov. et Sp. nov.	Colin J. O. Harrison	Early Eocene	MP 8	Denmark	An Apodidae, this is the type species of the new genus.	
Scopus xenopus	Valid	Sp. nov.	Storrs L. Olson	Early Pliocene	Varswater Formation	South Africa	A Scopidae	
Stintonornis mitchelli	Valid	Gen. nov. et Sp. nov.	Colin J. O. Harrison	Early Eocene	MP 8-9	UK: England	Described as a Falconidae, placed in Aves Incertae Sedis by Mlíkovský, 2002.	
Zhyraornis kashkarovi	Valid	Gen. nov. et Sp. nov.	Lev A. Nessov	Late Cretaceous	Coniacian, Bissekty Formation	USSR: Uzbekistan	An Enantiornithes Walker, 1981, Alexornithiformes, Brodkorb, 1976, Alexornithidae Brodkorb, 1976, Zhyraornithinae Nessov, 1984, this is the type species of the new genus.	

=== Pterosaurs ===
Name	Status	Authors	Location	Notes
Azhdarcho	Valid	Nesov	Spain; Tajikistan; Uzbekistan	the Type Genus of Azhdarchidae.
Brasileodactylus	Valid	Kellner	Brazil	
Rhamphinion	Valid	Padian	USA (Arizona)	

== Synapsids ==
=== Newly named mammals ===
Name	Novelty	Status	Authors	Age	Unit	Location	Notes	Images
Arcius	Gen et sp nov	Valid	Godinot	Early Eocene		France	A paromomyid, type species is A. rougieri	
