= List of Mesozoic bird-line archosaur genera (A–B) =

This list of Mesozoic bird-line archosaur genera is a comprehensive listing of all Mesozoic genera that are included in the clade Avemetatarsalia (alternatively known as Pan-Aves), including dinosaurs, pterosaurs, silesaurids, lagerpetids, and more basal genera. The list includes all commonly accepted genera whose names begin with the letters A and B. The list currently includes 302 genera.

== Scope and terminology ==
There is no official, canonical list of Mesozoic bird-line archosaur genera, but thorough attempts have been made for its various subgroups, such as George Olshevsky's Dinosaur Genera List, the book The Dinosauria, Mikko Haaramo's Phylogeny Archive, Mike Hanson's The Pterosauria, the Pterosaur Species List, Donald F. Glut's Dinosaurs: The Encyclopedia series, Holtz's list of Mesozoic dinosaurs, Molina-Perez & Larramendi's list of theropods, and Mickey Mortimer's Theropod Database. These lists have been supplemented with more recent publications to create this one.

- Genus: The generic name of the taxon, sourced to its description publication.
- Authors: Full names of the authors of the descriptions. This column can be sorted by last names.
- Year: The year when the descriptions were physically published. These are not necessarily the years the names became valid according to the rules of the International Commission on Zoological Nomenclature (ICZN).
- Formation: The geological formations each taxon was found in, along with their epoch and age. In the case of multiple formations, holotype localities are marked by an asterisk.
- Location: Every country and first-level subdivision the taxon was found in. In the case of multiple locations, holotype localities are marked by an asterisk.

== The list ==
Genus	Authors	Year	Formation	Location	Notes	Images
Aardonyx	Adam M. Yates; Matthew F. Bonnan; Johann Neveling; Anusuya Chinsamy; Marc G. Blackbeard	2010	Upper Elliot Formation (Early Jurassic, Sinemurian to Pliensbachian)	South Africa (Free State)	Primarily bipedal but also capable of limited quadrupedal locomotion	
Abavornis	Andrey V. Panteleyev	1998	Bissekty Formation (Late Cretaceous, Turonian)	Uzbekistan (Navoiy)	Only known from fragmentary coracoids	
Abdarainurus	Alexander O. Averianov; Alexey V. Lopatin	2020	Alagteeg Formation (Late Cretaceous, Santonian to Campanian)	Mongolia (Ömnögovi)	May represent an unknown lineage of Asian macronarians	
Abditosaurus	Bernat Vila; Albert G. Sellés; Miguel Moreno-Azanza; Novella L. Razzolini; Alejandro Gil-Delgado; José I. Canudo; Àngel Galobart	2022	Conques Formation (Late Cretaceous, Maastrichtian)	Spain (Catalonia)	Larger and distantly related to other European sauropods, suggesting it was an immigrant from another continent	
Abelisaurus	José F. Bonaparte; Fernando E. Novas	1985	Anacleto Formation (Late Cretaceous, Campanian)	Argentina (Río Negro)	Only known from a single partial skull	
Abitusavis	Min Wang; Zhiheng Li; Qingguo Liu; Zhonghe Zhou	2020	Yixian Formation (Early Cretaceous, Barremian)	China (Liaoning)	Preserved alongside fish remains, suggesting it was piscivorous	
Abrictosaurus	James A. Hopson	1975	Upper Elliot Formation (Early Jurassic, Sinemurian to Pliensbachian)	Lesotho (Qacha's Nek*); South Africa (Eastern Cape)	Known from two skulls, one of which possesses tusks, which may be an indication of sexual dimorphism	
Abrosaurus	Hui Ouyang	1989	Xiashaximiao Formation (Middle Jurassic to Late Jurassic, Bathonian to Oxfordian)	China (Sichuan)	Had a delicate skull with very large fenestrae	
Abydosaurus	Daniel J. Chure; Brooks B. Britt; John A. Whitlock; Jeffrey A. Wilson	2010	Cedar Mountain Formation (Early Cretaceous to Late Cretaceous, Albian to Cenomanian)	United States (Utah)	Had a domed skull similar to that of Giraffatitan	
Acantholipan	Héctor E. Rivera-Sylva; Eberhard Frey; Wolfgang Stinnesbeck; Gerardo Carbot-Chanona; Iván E. Sanchez-Uribe; José R. Guzmán-Gutiérrez	2018	Pen Formation (Late Cretaceous, Santonian)	Mexico (Coahuila)	Had spike-like osteoderms interpreted as coming from over the hips	
Acanthopholis	Thomas H. Huxley	1867	Chalk Group (Late Cretaceous, Cenomanian)	England (Kent)	Possessed keeled oval scutes as well as long spines	
Achelousaurus	Scott D. Sampson	1995	Two Medicine Formation (Late Cretaceous, Campanian)	United States (Montana)	Combines long spikes on the top of its frill and a low keratinous boss over its eyes and nose	
Acheroraptor	David C. Evans; Derek W. Larson; Philip J. Currie	2013	Hell Creek Formation (Late Cretaceous, Maastrichtian)	United States (Montana)	One of the geologically youngest dromaeosaurids	
Achillesaurus	Agustín G. Martinelli; Ezequiel I. Vera	2007	Bajo de la Carpa Formation (Late Cretaceous, Santonian)	Argentina (Río Negro)	Potentially a junior synonym of the contemporary Alvarezsaurus	
Achillobator	Altangerel Perle; Mark A. Norell; James M. Clark	1999	Bayanshiree Formation (Late Cretaceous, Cenomanian to Coniacian)	Mongolia (Dornogovi)	More robustly built compared to other dromaeosaurids	
Acristavus	Terry A. Gates; John R. Horner; Rebecca R. Hanna; C. Riley Nelson	2011	Two Medicine Formation (Late Cretaceous, Campanian)*; Wahweap Formation (Late Cretaceous, Campanian)	United States (Montana*; Utah)	Has no skull ornamentation	
Acrocanthosaurus	J. Willis Stovall; Wann Langston	1950	Antlers Formation (Early Cretaceous, Aptian)*; Arundel Formation (Early Cretaceous, Aptian to Albian); Cloverly Formation (Early Cretaceous to Late Cretaceous, Albian to Cenomanian); Twin Mountains Formation (Early Cretaceous, Aptian)	United States (Maryland; Oklahoma*; Texas; Wyoming)	Possessed elongated neural spines that would have supported a low sail or hump in life	
Acrotholus	David C. Evans; Ryan K. Schott; Derek W. Larson; Caleb M. Brown; Michael J. Ryan	2013	Milk River Formation (Late Cretaceous, Santonian)	Canada (Alberta)	Had a tall, oval-shaped dome	
Adamantisaurus	Rodrigo M. Santucci; Reinaldo J. Bertini	2006	Adamantina Formation (Late Cretaceous, Coniacian to Maastrichtian)	Brazil (São Paulo)	Derived for a titanosaur as indicated by the ball-and-socket articulations of its caudal vertebrae	
Adasaurus	Rinchen Barsbold	1983	Nemegt Formation (Late Cretaceous, Maastrichtian)	Mongolia (Ömnögovi)	Its sickle claw was markedly reduced compared to other dromaeosaurids	
Adelolophus	Terry A. Gates; Zubair Jinnah; Carolyn Levitt; Michael A. Getty	2014	Wahweap Formation (Late Cretaceous, Campanian)	United States (Utah)	Potentially a close relative of Parasaurolophus and Tlatolophus	
Adeopapposaurus	Ricardo N. Martínez	2009	Cañón del Colorado Formation (Early Jurassic, Hettangian to Toarcian)	Argentina (San Juan)	May have had a keratinous beak	
Adratiklit	Susannah C.R. Maidment; Thomas J. Raven; Driss Ouarhache; Paul M. Barrett	2020	El Mers III Formation (Middle Jurassic, Bathonian to Callovian)	Morocco (Fez-Meknes)	More closely related to European stegosaurs like Dacentrurus than African ones	
Adynomosaurus	Albert Prieto-Márquez; Víctor Fondevilla; Albert G. Sellés; Jonathan R. Wagner; Àngel Galobart	2019	Conques Formation (Late Cretaceous, Maastrichtian)	Spain (Catalonia)	Relatively basal for a hadrosaurid despite its late age	
Aegyptosaurus	Ernst Stromer	1932	Bahariya Formation (Late Cretaceous, Cenomanian)	Egypt (Giza)	Its holotype was destroyed in World War II	
Aeolosaurus	Jaime E. Powell	1987	Angostura Colorada Formation (Late Cretaceous, Campanian to Maastrichtian)*; Lago Colhué Huapí Formation (Late Cretaceous, Campanian to Maastrichtian); Los Alamitos Formation (Late Cretaceous, Campanian to Maastrichtian)	Argentina (Chubut; Río Negro*)	Known from the remains of several individuals	
Aepisaurus	Paul Gervais	1852	Grès verts hevétiques (Early Cretaceous, Albian)	France (Provence-Alpes-Côte d'Azur)	Shares some features with camarasaurids and titanosaurs, but its classification is uncertain	
Aepyornithomimus	Tsogtbaatar Chinzorig; Yoshitsugu Kobayashi; Khishigjav Tsogtbaatar; Philip J. Currie; Mahito Watabe; Rinchen Barsbold	2017	Djadokhta Formation (Late Cretaceous, Campanian)	Mongolia (Ömnögovi)	The first ornithomimosaur named from a dry desert environment	
Aerodactylus	Steven U. Vidovic; David M. Martill	2014	Altmühltal Formation (Late Jurassic, Tithonian)	Germany (Bavaria)	Possibly synonymous with Pterodactylus	
Aerodraco	Borja Holgado; Rodrigo V. Pêgas	2020	Cambridge Greensand (Early Cretaceous, Albian)	England (Cambridgeshire)	Assigned to four different pterosaur genera before its eventual reassessment as its own genus	
Aerosteon	Paul C. Sereno; Ricardo N. Martínez; Jeffrey A. Wilson; David J. Varricchio; Oscar A. Alcober; Hans C. E. Larsson	2008	Anacleto Formation (Late Cretaceous, Campanian)	Argentina (Mendoza)	Its bones were extensively pneumatized, suggesting an air sac system like that of modern birds	
Aerotitan	Fernando E. Novas; Martin Kundrát; Federico L. Agnolín; Martín D. Ezcurra; Per E. Ahlberg; Marcelo P. Isasi; Alberto Arriagada; Pablo Chafrat	2012	Allen Formation (Late Cretaceous, Maastrichtian)	Argentina (Río Negro)	The first unambiguous azhdarchid from South America	
Aetodactylus	Timothy S. Myers	2010	Tarrant Formation (Late Cretaceous, Cenomanian)	United States (Texas)	Had no bony crests on the lower jaw	
Afromimus	Paul C. Sereno	2017	Elrhaz Formation (Early Cretaceous, Barremian to Albian)	Niger (Agadez)	Originally described as an ornithomimosaur but has since been redescribed as a possible noasaurid	
Afrotapejara	David M. Martill; Roy Smith; David M. Unwin; Alexander Kao; James McPhee; Nizar Ibrahim	2020	Ifezouane Formation (Early Cretaceous to Late Cretaceous, Albian to Cenomanian)	Morocco (Drâa-Tafilalet)	The first tapejarid discovered in Africa	
Afrovenator	Paul C. Sereno; Jeffrey A. Wilson; Hans C. E. Larsson; Didier B. Dutheil; Hans-Dieter Sues	1994	Tiourarén Formation (Middle Jurassic to Late Jurassic, Bathonian to Oxfordian)	Niger (Agadez)	Originally thought to hail from the Early Cretaceous	
Agathaumas	Edward D. Cope	1872	Lance Formation (Late Cretaceous, Maastrichtian)	United States (Wyoming)	A painting by Charles Knight produced under this creature's name is actually based on fragments of other animals	
Agilisaurus	Guangzhao Peng	1990	Xiashaximiao Formation (Middle Jurassic to Late Jurassic, Bathonian to Oxfordian)	China (Sichuan)	The holotype was discovered during the construction of the Zigong Dinosaur Museum, where it is now housed	
Agnosphitys	Nicholas C. Fraser; Kevin Padian; Gordon M. Walkden; A. L. M. Davis	2002	Magnesian Conglomerate (Late Triassic, Norian to Rhaetian)	England (Bristol)	Has been considered a theropod, a sauropodomorph, and a silesaurid	
Agrosaurus	Harry G. Seeley	1891	Magnesian Conglomerate (Late Triassic, Norian to Rhaetian)	England (Bristol)	Originally mistakenly believed to be from Australia	
Agujaceratops	Spencer G. Lucas; Robert M. Sullivan; Adrian P. Hunt	2006	Aguja Formation (Late Cretaceous, Campanian)	United States (Texas)	The type species was originally assigned to Chasmosaurus	
Agustinia	José F. Bonaparte	1999	Lohan Cura Formation (Early Cretaceous, Aptian to Albian)	Argentina (Neuquén)	Originally described as possessing long spines running down its back, but these were based on fragments of other bones	
Ahshislepelta	Michael E. Burns; Robert M. Sullivan	2011	Kirtland Formation (Late Cretaceous, Campanian)	United States (New Mexico)	Relatively small compared to other North American ankylosaurs	
Ajkaceratops	Attila Ősi; Richard J. Butler; David B. Weishampel	2010	Csehbánya Formation (Late Cretaceous, Santonian)	Hungary (Veszprém)	Originally considered a ceratopsian but this is doubtful	
Ajnabia	Nicholas R. Longrich; Xabier Pereda-Suberbiola; R. Alexander Pyron; Nour-Eddine Jalil	2021	Couche III (Late Cretaceous, Maastrichtian)	Morocco (Béni Mellal-Khénifra)	The first hadrosaurid named from Africa	
Akainacephalus	Jelle P. Wiersma; Randall B. Irmis	2018	Kaiparowits Formation (Late Cretaceous, Campanian)	United States (Utah)	Much of the skeleton is known, including the entirety of the skull	
Akharhynchus	Megan L. Jacobs; Roy E. Smith; Samir Zouhri	2025	Ifezouane Formation (Early Cretaceous to Late Cretaceous, Albian to Cenomanian)	Morocco (Drâa-Tafilalet)	Similar to, contemporary with, and closely related to Siroccopteryx	
Alamitornis	Federico L. Agnolín; Agustín G. Martinelli	2009	Los Alamitos Formation (Late Cretaceous, Campanian to Maastrichtian)	Argentina (Río Negro)	Named as a tiny bird but may represent a squamate	
Alamodactylus	Brian Andres; Timothy S. Myers	2012	Atco Formation (Late Cretaceous, Coniacian)	United States (Texas)	Represents a rare pteranodontoid pterosaur from the Coniacian	
Alamosaurus	Charles W. Gilmore	1922	Ojo Alamo Formation (Late Cretaceous, Maastrichtian)	United States (New Mexico)	The first confirmed titanosaur known to have lived in North America	
Alanqa	Nizar Ibrahim; David M. Unwin; David M. Martill; Lahssen Baidder; Samir Zouhri	2010	Ifezouane Formation (Early Cretaceous to Late Cretaceous, Albian to Cenomanian)	Morocco (Drâa-Tafilalet)	Several pterosaur specimens from the Kem Kem Group were once assigned to this genus	
Alaskacephale	Robert M. Sullivan	2006	Prince Creek Formation (Late Cretaceous, Campanian to Maastrichtian)	United States (Alaska)	Had a double row of nodules on its squamosal	
Albadraco	Álexandru A. Solomon; Vlad A. Codrea; Márton Venczel; Gerald Grellet-Tinner	2020	Șard Formation (Late Cretaceous, Maastrichtian)	Romania (Alba)	Large but not as big as the contemporary Hatzegopteryx	
Albalophosaurus	Tomoyuki Ohashi; Paul M. Barrett	2009	Kuwajima Formation (Early Cretaceous, Barremian)	Japan (Ishikawa)	Only known from fragments of a skull	
Albertaceratops	Michael J. Ryan	2007	Oldman Formation (Late Cretaceous, Campanian)	Canada (Alberta)	Unlike most centrosaurines, it possessed long brow horns and only a short boss above the nose	
Albertadromeus	Caleb M. Brown; David C. Evans; Michael J. Ryan; Anthony P. Russell	2013	Oldman Formation (Late Cretaceous, Campanian)	Canada (Alberta)	The proportions of its hindlimb suggest a cursorial lifestyle	
Albertavenator	David C. Evans; Thomas M. Cullen; Derek W. Larson; Adam Rego	2017	Horseshoe Canyon Formation (Late Cretaceous, Maastrichtian)	Canada (Alberta)	Its discovery suggests that the true diversity of small theropods may be larger than previously thought	
Albertonykus	Nicholas R. Longrich; Philip J. Currie	2009	Horseshoe Canyon Formation (Late Cretaceous, Maastrichtian)	Canada (Alberta)	May have used its specialized forelimbs to dig into tree trunks for wood-boring termites	
Albertosaurus	Henry F. Osborn	1905	Horseshoe Canyon Formation (Late Cretaceous, Maastrichtian)	Canada (Alberta)	Known from more than thirty specimens, at least twenty-six of which have been preserved together	
Albinykus	Sterling J. Nesbitt; Julia A. Clarke; Alan H. Turner; Mark A. Norell	2011	Javkhlant Formation (Late Cretaceous, Santonian to Campanian)	Mongolia (Dornogovi)	Preserved in a sitting position not unlike that of modern birds	
Alcione	Nicholas R. Longrich; David M. Martill; Brian Andres	2018	Couche III (Late Cretaceous, Maastrichtian)	Morocco (Béni Mellal-Khénifra)	Had shortened wings which may be an adaptation for diving	
Alcmonavis	Oliver W. M. Rauhut; Helmut Tischlinger; Christian Foth	2019	Mörnsheim Formation (Late Jurassic, Tithonian)	Germany (Bavaria)	Contemporary with Archaeopteryx but belongs to a separate lineage of avialans	
Alcovasaurus	Peter M. Galton; Kenneth Carpenter	2016	Morrison Formation (Late Jurassic, Kimmeridgian to Tithonian)	United States (Wyoming)	Originally named as a species of Stegosaurus but was in fact more closely related to Dacentrurus	
Alectrosaurus	Charles W. Gilmore	1933	Iren Dabasu Formation (Late Cretaceous, Turonian to Maastrichtian)	China (Inner Mongolia)	Had long legs that were likely an adaptation to pursuit predation	
Alethoalaornis	Li Li; Dongyu Hu; Ye Duan; Enpu Gong; Lianhai Hou	2007	Jiufotang Formation (Early Cretaceous, Aptian)	China (Liaoning)	A poorly known enantiornithean	
Aletopelta	Tracy L. Ford; James Ian Kirkland	2001	Point Loma Formation (Late Cretaceous, Campanian)	United States (California)	Would have lived in present-day Mexico, but was found in California due to plate tectonics	
Alexornis	Pierce Brodkorb	1976	La Bocana Roja Formation (Late Cretaceous, Cenomanian to Turonian)	Mexico (Baja California)	Once thought to have been an ancient relative of rollers and woodpeckers	
Algoasaurus	Robert Broom	1904	Kirkwood Formation (Early Cretaceous, Berriasian to Hauterivian)	South Africa (Eastern Cape)	Originally known from several bones, but most were turned into bricks before they could be studied	
Alioramus	Sergei M. Kurzanov	1976	Nemegt Formation (Late Cretaceous, Maastrichtian)	Mongolia (Ömnögovi)	Possessed a long snout with a row of short crests	
Allkaruen	Laura Codorniú; Ariana Paulina-Carabajal; Diego Pol; David M. Unwin; Oliver W. M. Rauhut	2016	Cañadón Asfalto Formation (Early Jurassic, Toarcian)	Argentina (Chubut)	Known from a very well-preserved braincase	
Allosaurus	Othniel C. Marsh	1877	Alcobaça Formation (Late Jurassic, Oxfordian to Kimmeridgian); Lourinhã Formation (Late Jurassic, Kimmeridgian); Morrison Formation (Late Jurassic, Kimmeridgian to Tithonian)*	Portugal (Leiria; Lisbon); United States (Colorado*; Oklahoma; Utah; Wyoming)	Multiple specimens representing four species have been named, making it well-known both popularly and scientifically	
Almas	Rui Pei; Mark A. Norell; Daniel E. Barta; Gabriel S. Bever; Michael Pittman; Xing Xu	2017	Djadokhta Formation (Late Cretaceous, Campanian)	Mongolia (Ömnögovi)	Preserved alongside eggshells that may have come from a troodontid	
Alnashetri	Peter J. Makovicky; Sebastián Apesteguía; Federico A. Gianechini	2012	Candeleros Formation (Late Cretaceous, Cenomanian)	Argentina (Río Negro)	The oldest known alvarezsauroid from South America	
Alocodon	Richard A. Thulborn	1973	Cabaços Formation (Late Jurassic, Oxfordian)	Portugal (Leiria)	Had vertical grooves on its teeth	
Alpkarakush	Oliver W. M. Rauhut; Aizek A. Bakirov; Oliver Wings; Alexandra E. Fernandes; Tom R. Hübner	2024	Balabansai Formation (Middle Jurassic, Bathonian to Callovian)	Kyrgyzstan (Jalal-Abad)	Distinguished from other metriacanthosaurids by its unique orbital brow	
Altirhinus	David B. Norman	1998	Khuren Dukh Formation (Early Cretaceous, Aptian to Albian)	Mongolia (Dornogovi)	Had a distinctly elevated nasal bone that supported an enlarged nasal cavity	
Altispinax	Friedrich von Huene	1923	Wadhurst Clay Formation (Early Cretaceous, Valanginian)	England (East Sussex)	Possessed elongated neural spines that may have supported a hump-like structure as in Concavenator	
Altmuehlopterus	Steven U. Vidovic; David M. Martill	2018	Mörnsheim Formation (Late Jurassic, Tithonian)	Germany (Bavaria)	Possibly a synonym of Germanodactylus	
Alvarezsaurus	José F. Bonaparte	1991	Bajo de la Carpa Formation (Late Cretaceous, Santonian)	Argentina (Neuquén)	One of the largest known alvarezsaurids	
Alwalkeria	Sankar Chatterjee; Benjamin S. Creisler	1994	Lower Maleri Formation (Late Triassic, Carnian to Norian)	India (Andhra Pradesh)	May represent a chimera of dinosaurian, crurotarsan, and "prolacertiform" material	
Alxasaurus	Dale A. Russell; Zhiming Dong	1993	Bayin-Gobi Formation (Early Cretaceous, Albian)	China (Inner Mongolia)	Most of the skeleton is known, allowing researchers to connect therizinosaurs to other theropods	
Amanasaurus	Rodrigo T. Müller; Maurício S. Garcia	2023	Candelária Sequence (Late Triassic, Carnian)	Brazil (Rio Grande do Sul)	Named after the Carnian pluvial episode	
Amanzia	Daniela Schwarz; Philip D. Mannion; Oliver Wings; Christian A. Meyer	2020	Reuchenette Formation (Late Jurassic, Kimmeridgian)	Switzerland (Bern)	One bone preserves fossilized cartilage	
Amargasaurus	Leonardo Salgado; José F. Bonaparte	1991	La Amarga Formation (Early Cretaceous, Barremian to Aptian)	Argentina (Neuquén)	Possessed two rows of backward-pointing spines on its neck that may have been covered by a skin sail	
Amargatitanis	Sebastián Apesteguía	2007	La Amarga Formation (Early Cretaceous, Barremian to Aptian)	Argentina (Neuquén)	Originally described as a titanosaur but has since been reinterpreted as a dicraeosaurid	
Amazonsaurus	Ismar de Souza Carvalho; Leonardo dos Santos Avilla; Leonardo Salgado	2003	Itapecuru Formation (Early Cretaceous to Late Cretaceous, Aptian to Cenomanian)	Brazil (Maranhão)	Had tall caudal neural spines	
Ambiortus	Evgeny N. Kurochkin	1982	Andaikhudag Formation (Early Cretaceous, Hauterivian to Barremian)	Mongolia (Bayankhongor)	Once considered to be an early palaeognath	
Amblydectes	Reginald W. Hooley	1914	Cambridge Greensand (Early Cretaceous, Albian)	England (Cambridgeshire)	Closely related to Southern Hemisphere anhanguerids	
Ambopteryx	Min Wang; Jingmai K. O'Connor; Xing Xu; Zhonghe Zhou	2019	Haifanggou Formation (Late Jurassic, Oxfordian)	China (Liaoning)	Preserves stomach contents including gastroliths and bone fragments, suggesting an omnivorous diet	
Ampelognathus	Ronald S. Tykoski; Dori L. Contreras; Christopher Noto	2023	Lewisville Formation (Late Cretaceous, Cenomanian)	United States (Texas)	May be a primitive rhabdodontomorph	
Ampelosaurus	Jean Le Loeuff	1995	Marnes Rouges Inférieures Formation (Late Cretaceous, Maastrichtian)	France (Occitania)	Had different types of osteoderms, including spines, plates, and bulbs	
Amphicoelias	Edward D. Cope	1877	Morrison Formation (Late Jurassic, Kimmeridgian to Tithonian)	United States (Colorado)	Originally believed to date from the Cretaceous	
Amtocephale	Mahito Watabe; Khishigjav Tsogtbaatar; Robert M. Sullivan	2011	Bayanshiree Formation (Late Cretaceous, Cenomanian to Coniacian)	Mongolia (Ömnögovi)	One of the oldest known pachycephalosaurs	
Amtosaurus	Sergei M. Kurzanov; Tatyana A. Tumanova	1978	Bayanshiree Formation (Late Cretaceous, Cenomanian to Coniacian)	Mongolia (Ömnögovi)	May be either a hadrosaurid or an ankylosaurid	
Amurosaurus	Yuri L. Bolotsky; Sergei M. Kurzanov	1991	Udurchukan Formation (Late Cretaceous, Maastrichtian)*; Yuliangze Formation (Late Cretaceous, Maastrichtian)	China (Heilongjiang); Russia (Amur Oblast*)	One specimen may have come from an individual with a limp	
Amygdalodon	Angel Cabrera	1947	Cerro Carnerero Formation (Early Jurassic, Toarcian)	Argentina (Chubut)	Its teeth were shaped like almonds	
Anabisetia	Rodolfo A. Coria; Jorge O. Calvo	2002	Lisandro Formation (Late Cretaceous, Turonian)	Argentina (Neuquén)	Four specimens are known but do not include much skull material	
Analong	Xinxin Ren; Toru Sekiya; Tao Wang; Zhiwen Yang; Hailu You	2021	Chuanjie Formation (Middle Jurassic, Aalenian to Bajocian)	China (Yunnan)	Originally described as a specimen of Chuanjiesaurus but was given its own genus due to several morphological differences	
Anasazisaurus	Adrian P. Hunt; Spencer G. Lucas	1993	Kirtland Formation (Late Cretaceous, Campanian)	United States (New Mexico)	May have been a second species of Kritosaurus	
Anatalavis	Storrs L. Olson; David C. Parris	1987	Hornerstown Formation (Late Cretaceous to Paleocene, Maastrichtian to Danian)*; London Clay (Eocene, Ypresian)	England (Essex); United States (New Jersey*)	It is uncertain if the type species came from Cretaceous or Paleogene sediments	
Anchiceratops	Barnum Brown	1914	Horseshoe Canyon Formation (Late Cretaceous, Campanian to Maastrichtian)	Canada (Alberta)	Had a long triangular frill ringed by small triangular spikes	
Anchiornis	Xing Xu; Qi Zhao; Mark A. Norell; Corwin Sullivan; David W. E. Hone; Gregory M. Erickson; Xiaolin Wang; Fenglu Han; Yu Guo	2009	Tiaojishan Formation (Late Jurassic, Oxfordian)	China (Liaoning)	Analysis of fossilized melanosomes suggest it had a dark gray body, black and white patterns on the wings, and a red head crest	
Anchisaurus	Othniel C. Marsh	1885	Portland Formation (Early Jurassic, Hettangian to Sinemurian)	United States (Connecticut*; Massachusetts)	Some possible remains were originally misidentified as human skeletons	
Andesaurus	Jorge O. Calvo; José F. Bonaparte	1991	Candeleros Formation (Late Cretaceous, Cenomanian)	Argentina (Neuquén)	One of the most basal members of the Titanosauria	
Angolatitan	Octávio Mateus; Louis L. Jacobs; Anne S. Schulp; Michael J. Polcyn; Tatiana S. Tavares; André B. Neto; Maria L. Morais; Miguel T. Antunes	2011	Itombe Formation (Late Cretaceous, Coniacian)	Angola (Bengo)	The first non-avian dinosaur described from Angola	
Angulomastacator	Jonathan R. Wagner; Thomas M. Lehman	2009	Aguja Formation (Late Cretaceous, Campanian)	United States (Texas)	The anterior tip of its jaw was angled 45º downward, with the tooth row bent to match	
Angustinaripterus	Xinlu He; Daihuan Yang; Chunkang Su	1983	Xiashaximiao Formation (Middle Jurassic to Late Jurassic, Bathonian to Oxfordian)	China (Sichuan)	Had a long, flat snout with interlocking teeth that may have been used to trap fish	
Anhanguera	Diogenes A. Campos; Alexander W. A. Kellner	1985	Romualdo Formation (Early Cretaceous, Albian)	Brazil (Ceará)	A study of its inner ear shows that it held its head at an angle to the ground	
Anhuilong	Xinxin Ren; Jiandong Huang; Hailu You	2020	Hongqin Formation (Middle Jurassic, Aalenian to Callovian)	China (Anhui)	Closely related to Huangshanlong and Omeisaurus, with which it forms an exclusive clade of mamenchisaurids	
Aniksosaurus	Rubén D. F. Martínez; Fernando E. Novas	2006	Bajo Barreal Formation (Late Cretaceous, Cenomanian to Turonian)	Argentina (Chubut)	Several remains were found in a bone bed, suggesting a gregarious lifestyle	
Animantarx	Kenneth Carpenter; James I. Kirkland; Donald L. Burge; John Bird	1999	Cedar Mountain Formation (Early Cretaceous to Late Cretaceous, Albian to Cenomanian)	United States (Utah)	Its fossils were discovered by tracking the radiation they gave off, not by excavating a partially exposed skeleton	
Ankylosaurus	Barnum Brown	1908	Ferris Formation (Late Cretaceous, Maastrichtian); Frenchman Formation (Late Cretaceous, Maastrichtian); Hell Creek Formation (Late Cretaceous, Maastrichtian)*; Lance Formation (Late Cretaceous, Maastrichtian); Scollard Formation (Late Cretaceous, Maastrichtian)	Canada (Alberta; Saskatchewan); United States (Montana*; Wyoming)	The largest and most well-known ankylosaur	
Anodontosaurus	Charles M. Sternberg	1929	Dinosaur Park Formation (Late Cretaceous, Campanian); Horseshoe Canyon Formation (Late Cretaceous, Campanian to Maastrichtian)*	Canada (Alberta)	Originally mistakenly believed to have been toothless	
Anomalipes	Yilun Yu; Kebai Wang; Shuqing Chen; Corwin Sullivan; Shuo Wang; Peiye Wang; Xing Xu	2018	Wangshi Group (Late Cretaceous, Campanian)	China (Shandong)	May have been closely related to Gigantoraptor despite its smaller size	
Anoplosaurus	Harry G. Seeley	1879	Cambridge Greensand (Early Cretaceous, Albian)	England (Cambridgeshire)	Considered an ankylosaur despite the fact that no osteoderms have been found	
Anserimimus	Rinchen Barsbold	1988	Nemegt Formation (Late Cretaceous, Maastrichtian)	Mongolia (Ömnögovi)	Had powerful forelimbs with uniquely straight, flattened claws	
Antarcticavis	Amanda Cordes-Person; Carolina Acosta Hospitaleche; Judd Case; James Martin	2020	Snow Hill Island Formation (Late Cretaceous, Maastrichtian)	Antarctica (Argentine Antarctica; British Antarctic Territory; Chilean Antarctic Territory)	The oldest bird known from Antarctica	
Antarctopelta	Leonardo Salgado; Zulma Gasparini	2006	Snow Hill Island Formation (Late Cretaceous, Maastrichtian)	Antarctica (Argentine Antarctica; British Antarctic Territory; Chilean Antarctic Territory)	Possessed unusual caudal vertebrae that may have supported a "macuahuitl" as in the related Stegouros	
Antarctosaurus	Friedrich von Huene	1929	Anacleto Formation (Late Cretaceous, Campanian)	Argentina (Río Negro)	Multiple specimens have been referred to this genus, but so far only the holotype can be confidently assigned to it	
Antetonitrus	Adam M. Yates; James W. Kitching	2003	Upper Elliot Formation (Early Jurassic, Sinemurian to Pliensbachian)	South Africa (Free State)	Had weight-bearing adaptations in all its limbs, although its forelimbs retain some adaptations for grasping	
Antrodemus	Joseph Leidy	1870	Morrison Formation (Late Jurassic, Kimmeridgian to Tithonian)	United States (Colorado)	Although unconfirmed, it may be the same creature as Allosaurus, in which case the name Antrodemus will have priority	
Anurognathus	Ludwig Döderlein	1923	Altmühltal Formation (Late Jurassic, Tithonian)	Germany (Bavaria)	Had large eyes and long wings that suggest it was a crepuscular hunter that caught insects on the wing	
Anzu	Matthew C. Lamanna; Hans-Dieter Sues; Emma R. Schachner; Tyler R. Lyson	2014	Hell Creek Formation (Late Cretaceous, Maastrichtian)	United States (Montana; North Dakota; South Dakota*)	Large and known from considerably complete remains	
Aoniraptor	Matías J. Motta; Alexis Mauro Aranciaga Rolando; Sebastián Rozadilla; Federico L. Agnolín; Nicolás R. Chimento; Federico Brissón-Eglí; Fernando E. Novas	2016	Huincul Formation (Late Cretaceous, Cenomanian to Turonian)	Argentina (Río Negro)	Usually seen as a megaraptoran but has been considered a relative of the enigmatic Bahariasaurus	
Aorun	Jonah N. Choiniere; James M. Clark; Catherine A. Forster; Mark A. Norell; David A. Eberth; Gregory M. Erickson; Hongjun Chu; Xing Xu	2014	Shishugou Formation (Middle Jurassic to Late Jurassic, Callovian to Oxfordian)	China (Xinjiang)	Potentially a basal member of the alvarezsaurian lineage	
Apatodon	Othniel C. Marsh	1877	Morrison Formation (Late Jurassic, Kimmeridgian to Tithonian)	United States (Colorado)	Originally misidentified as the jawbone of a pig, but may be an Allosaurus vertebra instead	
Apatoraptor	Gregory F. Funston; Philip J. Currie	2016	Horseshoe Canyon Formation (Late Cretaceous, Campanian)	Canada (Alberta)	Quill knobs on its ulna suggest it had wings	
Apatorhamphus	James McPhee; Nizar Ibrahim; Alex Kao; David M. Unwin; Roy Smith; David M. Martill	2020	Ifezouane Formation (Early Cretaceous to Late Cretaceous, Albian to Cenomanian)	Morocco (Drâa-Tafilalet)	Named based on isolated jaw bones once assigned to different pterosaur groups	
Apatornis	Othniel C. Marsh	1873	Niobrara Formation (Late Cretaceous, Coniacian to Campanian)	United States (Kansas)	Only known from an isolated synsacrum	
Apatosaurus	Othniel C. Marsh	1877	Morrison Formation (Late Jurassic, Kimmeridgian to Tithonian)	United States (Colorado*; New Mexico; Oklahoma; Utah; Wyoming)	Its skeleton was more robust than those of most diplodocids	
Appalachiosaurus	Thomas D. Carr; Thomas E. Williamson; David R. Schwimmer	2005	Demopolis Chalk (Late Cretaceous, Campanian)*; Donoho Creek Formation (Late Cretaceous, Campanian); Tar Heel/Coachman Formation (Late Cretaceous, Campanian)	United States (Alabama*; North Carolina; South Carolina)	The most complete theropod known from the eastern side of North America	
Apsaravis	Mark A. Norell; Julia A. Clarke	2001	Djadokhta Formation (Late Cretaceous, Campanian)	Mongolia (Ömnögovi)	The first basal ornithurine named from a desert environment	
Aquilarhinus	Albert Prieto-Márquez; Jonathan R. Wagner; Thomas M. Lehman	2020	Aguja Formation (Late Cretaceous, Campanian)	United States (Texas)	May have been a semiaquatic coastal species that used its shovel-shaped bill to scoop up vegetation in wet sediment	
Aquilops	Andrew A. Farke; W. Desmond Maxwell; Richard L. Cifelli; Mathew J. Wedel	2014	Cloverly Formation (Early Cretaceous, Albian)	United States (Montana)	Had a short horn protruding from its upper beak	
Arackar	David Rubilar-Rogers; Alexander O. Vargas; Bernardo Javier González Riga; Sergio Soto-Acuña; Jhonatan Alarcón-Muñoz; José Iriarte-Díaz; Carlos Arévalo; Carolina Simon-Gutstein	2021	Hornitos Formation (Late Cretaceous, Campanian to Maastrichtian)	Chile (Atacama)	The most complete sauropod known from Chile	
Aragosaurus	José L. Sanz; Angela D. Buscalioni; Maria Lourdes Casanovas-Cladellas; José V. Santafé	1987	Villar del Arzobispo Formation (Late Jurassic to Early Cretaceous, Tithonian to Berriasian)	Spain (Aragon)	Named after its unique ischium anatomy	
Aralazhdarcho	Alexander O. Averianov	2007	Bostobe Formation (Late Cretaceous, Santonian to Campanian)	Kazakhstan (Kyzylorda)	One of the more primitive azhdarchids	
Aralosaurus	Anatoly K. Rozhdestvensky	1968	Bostobe Formation (Late Cretaceous, Santonian to Campanian)	Kazakhstan (Kyzylorda)	Its crest has been interpreted as being arch-shaped as in kritosaurins, but this cannot be confirmed	
Arambourgiania	Lev A. Nessov	1984	Ruseifa Formation (Late Cretaceous, Maastrichtian)	Jordan (Zarqa)	Several specimens from Africa and North America have been assigned to this giant pterosaur, but it is uncertain if they belong to the type species	
Araripedactylus	Peter Wellnhofer	1977	Romualdo Formation (Early Cretaceous, Albian)	Brazil (Ceará)	One of the first pterosaurs named from Brazil	
Araripesaurus	Llewellyn I. Price	1971	Romualdo Formation (Early Cretaceous, Albian)	Brazil (Ceará)	Fragmentary but similar to some specimens of Anhanguera	
Aratasaurus	Juliana M. Sayão; Antônio Á. F. Saraiva; Arthur S. Brum; Renan A. M. Bantim; Rafael C. L. P. de Andrade; Xin Cheng; Flaviana J. de Lima; Helder P. Silva; Alexander W. A. Kellner	2020	Romualdo Formation (Early Cretaceous, Albian)	Brazil (Ceará)	All three of its toes are symmetric	
Archaeoceratops	Zhiming Dong; Yoichi Azuma	1997	Xiagou Formation (Early Cretaceous, Aptian); Zhonggou Formation (Early Cretaceous, Aptian)*	China (Gansu)	Had no horns and only the beginnings of a frill	
Archaeocursor	Xi Yao; Qi Zhao; Tingcong Ren; Guangbiao Wei; Xing Xu	2025	Ziliujing Formation (Early Jurassic, Sinemurian to Toarcian)	China (Chongqing)	The oldest and most primitive ornithischian from Asia	
Archaeodontosaurus	Eric Buffetaut	2005	Isalo III Formation (Middle Jurassic, Bajocian to Bathonian)	Madagascar (Boeny)	Retained teeth similar to primitive sauropodomorphs despite its late age and derived position	
Archaeoistiodactylus	Junchang Lü; Xiaohui Fucha	2010	Tiaojishan Formation (Late Jurassic, Oxfordian)	China (Liaoning)	Described as an early Istiodactylus relative but may actually be closer to Darwinopterus	
Archaeopteryx	Hermann von Meyer	1861	Altmühltal Formation (Late Jurassic, Tithonian)*; Mörnsheim Formation (Late Jurassic, Tithonian)	Germany (Bavaria)	Combines bird-like pennaceous feathers with teeth, claws, and a long tail otherwise characteristic of reptiles	
Archaeorhynchus	Zhonghe Zhou; Fucheng Zhang	2006	Yixian Formation (Early Cretaceous, Barremian)	China (Liaoning)	One of the oldest avialans known to have a beak	
Archaeornithoides	Andrzej Elżanowski; Peter Wellnhofer	1992	Djadokhta Formation (Late Cretaceous, Campanian)	Mongolia (Ömnögovi)	Known from a partial skull with scratches that may have been created by a small mammal	
Archaeornithomimus	Dale A. Russell	1972	Iren Dabasu Formation (Late Cretaceous, Turonian to Maastrichtian)	China (Inner Mongolia)	Unlike other ornithomimosaurs, its feet were not arctometatarsalian	
Archaeornithura	Min Wang; Xiaoting Zheng; Jingmai K. O'Connor; Graeme T. Lloyd; Xiaoli Wang; Yan Wang; Xiaomei Zhang; Zhonghe Zhou	2015	Huajiying Formation (Early Cretaceous, Hauterivian)	China (Hebei)	One of the oldest known ornithuromorphs	
Arcovenator	Thierry Tortosa; Eric Buffetaut; Nicolas Vialle; Yves Dutour; Eric Turini; Gilles Cheylan	2014	Argiles et Grès à Reptiles Formation (Late Cretaceous, Campanian)	France (Provence-Alpes-Côte d'Azur)	Most closely related to abelisaurids from India and Madagascar	
Arcticodactylus	Alexander W. A. Kellner	2015	Ørsted Dal Formation (Late Triassic, Norian to Rhaetian)	Greenland (Sermersooq)	One of the smallest, oldest, and most primitive pterosaurs	
Arcusaurus	Adam M. Yates; Matthew F. Bonnan; Johann Neveling	2011	Upper Elliot Formation (Early Jurassic, Sinemurian to Pliensbachian)	South Africa (Free State)	Combines traits of primitive and advanced sauropodomorphs	
Ardeadactylus	Christopher Bennett	2013	Altmühltal Formation (Late Jurassic, Tithonian); Mörnsheim Formation (Late Jurassic, Tithonian); Nusplingen Limestone (Late Jurassic, Kimmeridgian)*	Germany (Baden-Württemberg*; Bavaria)	May have eaten larger fish than its smaller contemporary Pterodactylus	
Ardetosaurus	Tom T.P. van der Linden; Emanuel Tschopp; Roland B. Sookias; Jonathan J.W. Wallaard; Femke M. Holwerda; Anne S. Schulp	2024	Morrison Formation (Late Jurassic, Kimmeridgian)	United States (Wyoming)	Its holotype was damaged in a museum fire	
Arenysaurus	Xabier Pereda-Suberbiola; José Ignacio Canudo; Penélope Cruzado-Caballero; José Luis Barco; Nieves López-Martínez; Oriol Oms; José Ignacio Ruiz-Omeñaca	2009	Conques Formation (Late Cretaceous, Maastrichtian)	Spain (Aragon)	One of the last lambeosaurines prior to the extinction of the non-avian dinosaurs	
Argentinadraco	Alexander W. A. Kellner; Jorge O. Calvo	2017	Portezuelo Formation (Late Cretaceous, Turonian to Coniacian)	Argentina (Neuquén)	Had unusual ridges on its lower jaw that may have helped it probe for crustaceans in loose sediment	
Argentinosaurus	José F. Bonaparte; Rodolfo A. Coria	1993	Huincul Formation (Late Cretaceous, Cenomanian to Turonian)	Argentina (Neuquén)	May have been the largest known dinosaur	
Argyrosaurus	Richard Lydekker	1893	Lago Colhué Huapí Formation (Late Cretaceous, Campanian to Maastrichtian)	Argentina (Chubut)	Several remains were historically assigned to this genus, but only the holotype can be confidently assigned to it	
Aristosuchus	Harry G. Seeley	1887	Wessex Formation (Early Cretaceous, Berriasian to Barremian)	England (Isle of Wight)	Referred unguals suggest this creature had long claws	
Arkansaurus	Rebecca K. Hunt; James H. Quinn	2018	Trinity Group (Early Cretaceous, Aptian to Albian)	United States (Arkansas)	Its scientific name was in use long before its formal description	
Arkharavia	Vladimir R. Alifanov; Yuri L. Bolotsky	2010	Udurchukan Formation (Late Cretaceous, Maastrichtian)	Russia (Amur Oblast)	Described from a series of vertebrae, several of which may not belong to this taxon	
Arrhinoceratops	William A. Parks	1925	Horseshoe Canyon Formation (Late Cretaceous, Campanian to Maastrichtian)	Canada (Alberta)	Described as lacking a nasal horn although this is an artifact of preservation	
Arrudatitan	Julian C.G. Silva Junior; Agustín G. Martinelli; Fabiano V. Iori; Thiago S. Marinho; E. Martín Hechenleitner; Max C. Langer	2022	Adamantina Formation (Late Cretaceous, Coniacian to Maastrichtian)	Brazil (São Paulo)	Its tail probably curved strongly downwards, with the tip held very low to the ground	
Arstanosaurus	P. V. Shilin; Yu. V. Suslov	1982	Bostobe Formation (Late Cretaceous, Santonian to Campanian)	Kazakhstan (Kyzylorda)	A poorly known possible hadrosauroid	
Arthurdactylus	Eberhard Frey; David M. Martill	1994	Crato Formation (Early Cretaceous, Aptian)	Brazil (Ceará)	The first pterosaur described from the Crato Formation	
Asfaltovenator	Oliver W. M. Rauhut; Diego Pol	2019	Cañadón Asfalto Formation (Early Jurassic, Toarcian)	Argentina (Chubut)	Combines traits of megalosauroid and allosauroid theropods	
Asiaceratops	Lev A. Nessov; L. F. Kaznyshkina; G. O. Cherepanov	1989	Khodzhakul Formation (Late Cretaceous, Cenomanian)	Uzbekistan (Karakalpakstan)	Potentially a leptoceratopsid	
Asiahesperornis	Lev A. Nessov; B. V. Prizemlin	1991	Zhuravlovskaya Svita (Late Cretaceous, Maastrichtian)	Kazakhstan (Kostanay)	Similar to Hesperornis	
Asiamericana	Lev A. Nessov	1995	Bissekty Formation (Late Cretaceous, Turonian)	Uzbekistan (Navoiy)	Has been suggested to be a fish, a spinosaurid, or a species of Richardoestesia	
Asiatosaurus	Henry F. Osborn	1924	Öösh Formation (Early Cretaceous, Berriasian to Barremian)*; Xinlong Formation (Early Cretaceous, Aptian to Albian)	China (Guangxi); Mongolia (Övörkhangai*)	Two species are known but both are only known from scant remains	
Asiatyrannus	Wenjie Zheng; Xingsheng Jin; Junfang Xie; Tianming Du	2024	Nanxiong Formation (Late Cretaceous, Maastrichtian)	China (Jiangxi)	Known from an individual initially interpreted as a small adult, but may be a juvenile of a larger species	
Asilisaurus	Sterling J. Nesbitt; Christian A. Sidor; Randall B. Irmis; Kenneth D. Angielczyk; Roger M. H. Smith; Linda A. Tsuji	2010	Manda Formation (Middle Triassic to Late Triassic, Anisian to Carnian)	Tanzania (Ruvuma)	May be one of the oldest bird-line archosaurs	
Asteriornis	Daniel J. Field; Juan Benito; Albert Chen; John W. M. Jagt; Daniel T. Ksepka	2020	Maastricht Formation (Late Cretaceous, Maastrichtian)	Belgium (Wallonia)	The most complete crown-group bird known from the Mesozoic, providing a lot of information about their early evolution	
Astrodon	Joseph Leidy	1865	Arundel Formation (Early Cretaceous, Aptian to Albian)	United States (Maryland)	State dinosaur of Maryland	
Astrophocaudia	Michael D. D'Emic	2013	Paluxy Formation (Early Cretaceous, Albian)	United States (Texas)	Known from a single partial skeleton	
Asylosaurus	Peter M. Galton	2007	Magnesian Conglomerate (Late Triassic, Norian to Rhaetian)	England (Bristol)	Remains originally identified as Thecodontosaurus	
Atacamatitan	Alexander W. A. Kellner; David Rubilar-Rogers; Alexander O. Vargas; Mario Suárez	2011	Tolar Formation (Late Cretaceous, Cenomanian to Maastrichtian)	Chile (Antofagasta)	Only known from a single, fragmentary skeleton	
Atlantosaurus	Othniel C. Marsh	1877	Morrison Formation (Late Jurassic, Kimmeridgian to Tithonian)	United States (Colorado)	The type species may be synonymous with Apatosaurus, but a referred one may belong to its own genus	
Atlasaurus	Michel Monbaron; Dale A. Russell; Philippe Taquet	1999	Guettioua Formation (Middle Jurassic, Bathonian to Callovian)	Morocco (Béni Mellal-Khénifra)	Possessed proportionately long legs for a sauropod	
Atlascopcosaurus	Thomas H. Rich; Patricia Vickers-Rich	1989	Eumeralla Formation (Early Cretaceous, Aptian to Albian)	Australia (Victoria)	Only known from remains of jaws and teeth	
Atrociraptor	Philip J. Currie; David J. Varricchio	2004	Horseshoe Canyon Formation (Late Cretaceous, Campanian to Maastrichtian)	Canada (Alberta)	Had a short, deep snout with enlarged teeth	
Atsinganosaurus	Géraldine Garcia; Sauveur Amico; Francois Fournier; Eudes Thouand; Xavier Valentin	2010	Argiles et Grès à Reptiles Formation (Late Cretaceous, Campanian)	France (Provence-Alpes-Côte d'Azur)	Belongs to the Lirainosaurinae, a group of titanosaurs endemic to southern Europe and northern Africa during the Late Cretaceous	
Aublysodon	Joseph Leidy	1868	Judith River Formation (Late Cretaceous, Campanian)	United States (Montana)	Only known from teeth that may come from juvenile tyrannosaurids	
Aucasaurus	Rodolfo A. Coria; Luis M. Chiappe; Lowell Dingus	2002	Anacleto Formation (Late Cretaceous, Campanian)	Argentina (Neuquén)	Known from most of the skeleton, including most of the skull	
Augustynolophus	Albert Prieto-Márquez; Jonathan R. Wagner; Phil R. Bell; Luis M. Chiappe	2015	Moreno Formation (Late Cretaceous, Maastrichtian)	United States (California)	State dinosaur of California	
Auroraceratops	Hailu You; Daqing Li; Qiang Ji; Matthew C. Lamanna; Peter Dodson	2005	Zhonggou Formation (Early Cretaceous, Aptian)	China (Gansu)	Known from more than eighty specimens, including complete skeletons	
Aurorazhdarcho	Eberhard Frey; Christian A. Meyer; Helmut Tischlinger	2011	Altmühltal Formation (Late Jurassic, Tithonian)	Germany (Bavaria)	May represent juvenile specimens of Gnathosaurus	
Aurornis	Pascal Godefroit; Andrea Cau; Dongyu Hu; François Escuillié; Wenhao Wu; Gareth J. Dyke	2013	Tiaojishan Formation (Late Jurassic, Oxfordian)	China (Liaoning)	If an avialan as originally described, it would be one of the oldest members of the group	
Aussiedraco	Alexander W. A. Kellner; Taissa Rodrigues; Fabiana R. Costa	2011	Toolebuc Formation (Early Cretaceous, Albian)	Australia (Queensland)	Originally believed to be a specimen of Ornithocheirus, Lonchodectes, or Anhanguera	
Austinornis	Julia A. Clarke	2004	Austin Chalk (Late Cretaceous, Coniacian to Santonian)	United States (Texas)	May be a pangalliform, but this is uncertain	
Australodocus	Kristian Remes	2007	Tendaguru Formation (Late Jurassic, Tithonian)	Tanzania (Lindi)	Potentially an early euhelopodid	
Australotitan	Scott A. Hocknull; Melville Wilkinson; Rochelle A. Lawrence; Vladislav Konstantinov; Stuart Mackenzie; Robyn Mackenzie	2021	Winton Formation (Late Cretaceous, Cenomanian to Turonian)	Australia (Queensland)	The largest dinosaur specimen known from Australia, comparable in size to some South American dinosaurs	
Australovenator	Scott A. Hocknull; Matt A. White; Travis R. Tischler; Alex G. Cook; Naomi D. Calleja; Trish Sloan; David A. Elliott	2009	Winton Formation (Late Cretaceous, Cenomanian to Turonian)	Australia (Queensland)	Analysis of its arms suggests it was well adapted to grasping	
Austriadactylus	Fabio M. Dalla Vecchia; Rupert Wild; Hagen Hopf; Joachim Reitner	2002	Seefeld Formation (Late Triassic, Norian)	Austria (Tyrol)	Had a crest on its snout, a rarity for early pterosaurs	
Austriadraco	Alexander W. A. Kellner	2015	Seefeld Formation (Late Triassic, Norian)	Austria (Tyrol)	Similar to Eudimorphodon but contains enough differences to be described as a separate genus	
Austrocheirus	Martín D. Ezcurra; Federico L. Agnolín; Fernando E. Novas	2010	Cerro Fortaleza Formation (Late Cretaceous, Campanian to Maastrichtian)	Argentina (Santa Cruz)	Initially described as an abelisauroid but this is doubted by some researchers	
Austroposeidon	Kamila L. N. Bandeira; Felipe M. Simbras; Elaine B. Machado; Diogenes A. Campos; Gustavo R. Oliveira; Alexander W. A. Kellner	2016	Presidente Prudente Formation (Late Cretaceous, Campanian to Maastrichtian)	Brazil (São Paulo)	One of the largest dinosaurs known from Brazil	
Austroraptor	Fernando E. Novas; Diego Pol; Juan I. Canale; Juan D. Porfiri; Jorge O. Calvo	2009	Allen Formation (Late Cretaceous, Maastrichtian)	Argentina (Río Negro)	Possessed an elongated snout paralleling those of spinosaurids	
Austrosaurus	Heber A. Longman	1933	Allaru Formation (Early Cretaceous, Albian)	Australia (Queensland)	Its fossils were found associated with marine shells	
Avaceratops	Peter Dodson	1986	Judith River Formation (Late Cretaceous, Campanian)	United States (Montana)	Lacked fenestrae in its frill, a feature shared only with Triceratops	
Aviatyrannis	Oliver W. M. Rauhut	2003	Alcobaça Formation (Late Jurassic, Kimmeridgian)	Portugal (Leiria)	Although originally described as a tyrannosauroid, it may in fact be the oldest known ornithomimosaur	
Avimaia	Alida M. Bailleul; Jingmai K. O'Connor; Shukang Zhang; Zhiheng Li; Qiang Wang; Matthew C. Lamanna; Xufeng Zhu; Zhonghe Zhou	2019	Xiagou Formation (Early Cretaceous, Aptian)	China (Gansu)	One specimen died with an unlaid egg in its body	
Avimimus	Sergei M. Kurzanov	1981	Djadokhta Formation (Late Cretaceous, Campanian)*; Nemegt Formation (Late Cretaceous, Maastrichtian)	Mongolia (Ömnögovi)	Bonebed remains suggest it was at least partially gregarious, probably forming age-segregated leks or flocks	
Avisaurus	Michael K. Brett-Surman; Gregory S. Paul	1985	Hell Creek Formation (Late Cretaceous, Maastrichtian)	United States (Montana)	Originally considered a non-avialan dinosaur	
Aymberedactylus	Rodrigo V. Pêgas; Maria Eduarda C. Leal; Alexander W. A. Kellner	2016	Crato Formation (Early Cretaceous, Aptian)	Brazil (Ceará)	Known from a three-dimensionally preserved toothless mandible	
Azhdarcho	Lev A. Nessov	1984	Bissekty Formation (Late Cretaceous, Turonian)	Uzbekistan (Navoiy)	One of the smallest and earliest unambiguous azhdarchids	
Baalsaurus	Jorge O. Calvo; Bernardo J. González Riga	2019	Portezuelo Formation (Late Cretaceous, Turonian to Coniacian)	Argentina (Neuquén)	Had a squared-off dentary with its teeth crowded to the front	
Bactrosaurus	Charles W. Gilmore	1933	Iren Dabasu Formation (Late Cretaceous, Turonian to Maastrichtian)	China (Inner Mongolia)	Remains of at least six individuals are known, making up much of the skeleton	
Bagaceratops	Teresa Maryańska; Halszka Osmólska	1975	Baruungoyot Formation (Late Cretaceous, Maastrichtian)*; Bayan Mandahu Formation (Late Cretaceous, Campanian)	China (Inner Mongolia); Mongolia (Ömnögovi*)	May have been a direct descendant of Protoceratops which it physically resembles	
Bagaraatan	Halszka Osmólska	1996	Nemegt Formation (Late Cretaceous, Maastrichtian)	Mongolia (Ömnögovi)	As described, it represented a chimera of tyrannosauroid and caenagnathid bones	
Bagualia	Diego Pol; J. Ramezani; Kevin L. Gomez; José L. Carballido; Ariana Paulina Carabajal; Oliver W. M. Rauhut; I. H. Escapa; N. R. Cúneo	2020	Cañadón Asfalto Formation (Early Jurassic, Toarcian)	Argentina (Chubut)	Represented a radiation of eusauropods that displaced earlier primitive sauropodomorphs after a global warming event	
Bagualosaurus	Flávio A. Pretto; Max C. Langer; Cesar L. Schultz	2019	Candelária Sequence (Late Triassic, Carnian)	Brazil (Rio Grande do Sul)	Had relatively robust hind limbs for a basal sauropodomorph	
Bahariasaurus	Ernst Stromer	1934	Bahariya Formation (Late Cretaceous, Cenomanian)	Egypt (Giza)	Large but known from relatively few remains	
Bainoceratops	Victor S. Tereshchenko; Vladimir R. Alifanov	2003	Djadokhta Formation (Late Cretaceous, Campanian)	Mongolia (Ömnögovi)	Its supposedly diagnostic features may fall within Protoceratops variation	
Baiyinosaurus	Ning Li; Susannah C.R. Maidment; Daqing Li; Hai-Lu You; Guangzhao Peng	2024	Wangjiashan Formation (Middle Jurassic, Bathonian)	China (Gansu)	Exhibits anatomical characteristics transitional between basal thyreophorans and derived stegosaurs	
Bajadasaurus	Pablo A. Gallina; Sebastián Apesteguía; Juan I. Canale; Alejandro Haluza	2019	Bajada Colorada Formation (Early Cretaceous, Berriasian to Valanginian)	Argentina (Neuquén)	Possessed elongated, forward-pointing spines erupting in pairs from the neck	
Bakonydraco	Attila Ősi; David B. Weishampel; Coralia M. Jianu	2005	Csehbánya Formation (Late Cretaceous, Santonian)	Hungary (Veszprém)	Has been considered a late-surviving tapejarid	
Balaenognathus	David M. Martill; Eberhard Frey; Helmut Tischlinger; Matthias Mäuser; Héctor E. Rivera-Sylva; Steven U. Vidovic	2023	Torleite Formation (Late Jurassic, Kimmeridgian)	Germany (Bavaria)	May have been either a suspension feeder or a gular-pumping filter feeder based on its jaw anatomy	
Balaur	Zoltán Csiki; Mátyás Vremir; Stephen L. Brusatte; Mark A. Norell	2010	Densuș-Ciula Formation (Late Cretaceous, Maastrichtian); Sebeș Formation (Late Cretaceous, Maastrichtian)*	Romania (Alba*; Hunedoara)	Had a suite of unique features, including robust muscles, two sickle claws, a didactyl manus, and a deep gut, which may be results of its island habitat	
Bambiraptor	David A. Burnham; Kraig Derstler; Philip J. Currie; Robert T. Bakker; Zhonghe Zhou; John H. Ostrom	2000	Two Medicine Formation (Late Cretaceous, Campanian)	United States (Montana)	Small but well-preserved enough to display a mix of non-avian and avian features	
Banguela	Jaime A. Headden; Hebert B. N. Campos	2015	Romualdo Formation (Early Cretaceous, Albian)	Brazil (Ceará)	May be a second species of Thalassodromeus	
Banji	Xing Xu; Fenglu Han	2010	Nanxiong Formation (Late Cretaceous, Maastrichtian)	China (Jiangxi)	Had vertical striations on its crest	
Bannykus	Xing Xu; Jonah N. Choiniere; Qingwei Tan; Roger B.J. Benson; James M. Clark; Corwin Sullivan; Qi Zhao; Fenglu Han; Qingyu Ma; Yiming He; Shuo Wang; Hai Xing; Lin Tan	2018	Bayin-Gobi Formation (Early Cretaceous, Albian)	China (Inner Mongolia)	Exhibited a transitional hand morphology for an alvarezsaur, having three fingers of roughly equal length with the first one being robust	
Baotianmansaurus	Xingliao Zhang; Junchang Lü; Li Xu; Jinhua Li; Li Yang; Weiyong Hu; Songhai Jia; Qiang Ji; Chengjun Zhang	2009	Gaogou Formation (Late Cretaceous, Cenomanian to Coniacian)	China (Henan)	Large but only known from a few bones	
Baptornis	Othniel C. Marsh	1877	Niobrara Formation (Late Cretaceous, Coniacian to Campanian)	United States (Kansas)	Possible remains are known from northern Europe	
Barapasaurus	Sohan L. Jain; T. S. Kutty; T. Roy-Chowdhury; Sankar Chatterjee	1975	Kota Formation (Early Jurassic to Middle Jurassic, Pliensbachian to Callovian)	India (Telangana)	Several individuals have been found associated with tree trunks, which may represent the aftermath of a flood	
Barbaridactylus	Nicholas R. Longrich; David M. Martill; Brian Andres	2018	Couche III (Late Cretaceous, Maastrichtian)	Morocco (Béni Mellal-Khénifra)	A very close relative or even species of Nyctosaurus	
Barbosania	Ross A. Elgin; Eberhard Frey	2011	Romualdo Formation (Early Cretaceous, Albian)	Brazil (Ceará)	Several specimens formerly assigned to Brasileodactylus may be assignable to this genus	
Barilium	David B. Norman	2010	Wadhurst Clay Formation (Early Cretaceous, Valanginian)	England (East Sussex)	Robust with strong vertebrae with short neural spines	
Barosaurus	Othniel C. Marsh	1890	Morrison Formation (Late Jurassic, Kimmeridgian to Tithonian)	United States (South Dakota*; Utah)	Similar to Diplodocus but larger and with a longer neck	
Barrosasaurus	Leonardo Salgado; Rodolfo A. Coria	2009	Anacleto Formation (Late Cretaceous, Campanian)	Argentina (Neuquén)	Only known from three vertebrae but are well-preserved enough to warrant recognition as a distinct genus	
Barsboldia	Teresa Maryańska; Halszka Osmólska	1981	Nemegt Formation (Late Cretaceous, Maastrichtian)	Mongolia (Ömnögovi)	Possessed elongated neural spines that are tallest above the hips	
Baryonyx	Alan J. Charig; Angela C. Milner	1986	Weald Clay (Early Cretaceous, Hauterivian to Barremian)	England (Surrey)	One specimen was found with the remains of fish and a juvenile iguanodont in its stomach, suggesting it was a generalist predator	
Bashanosaurus	Hui Dai; Ning Li; Susannah C.R. Maidment; Guangbiao Wei; Yuxuan Zhou; Xufeng Hu; Qingyu Ma; Xunqian Wang; Haiqian Hu; Guangzhao Peng	2021	Xiashaximiao Formation (Middle Jurassic to Late Jurassic, Bathonian to Oxfordian)	China (Chongqing)	One of the most primitive stegosaurs, with a skeleton that combines traits of stegosaurs and more basal thyreophorans	
Bashunosaurus	Xuewen Kuang	2004	Xiashaximiao Formation (Middle Jurassic to Late Jurassic, Bathonian to Oxfordian)	China (Sichuan)	Although described as a macronarian, this has yet to be rigorously tested	
Batrachognathus	Anatoly N. Riabinin	1948	Karabastau Formation (Middle Jurassic to Late Jurassic, Callovian to Kimmeridgian)	Kazakhstan (Jambyl)	Had a U-shaped snout somewhat similar to those of frogs	
Batyrosaurus	Pascal Godefroit; François Escuillié; Yuri L. Bolotsky; Pascaline Lauters	2012	Bostobe Formation (Late Cretaceous, Santonian to Campanian)	Kazakhstan (Kyzylorda)	Remains originally identified as Arstanosaurus	
Baurutitan	Alexander W. A. Kellner; Diogenes A. Campos; Marcelo N. F. Trotta	2005	Serra da Galga Formation (Late Cretaceous, Maastrichtian)	Brazil (Minas Gerais)	Originally described from an associated series of nineteen vertebrae, with new remains discovered later	
Bauxitornis	Gareth J. Dyke; Attila Ősi	2010	Csehbánya Formation (Late Cretaceous, Santonian)	Hungary (Veszprém)	Fragmentary but unique in the structure of its tarsometatarsus	
Bayannurosaurus	Xing Xu; Qingwei Tan; Yilong Gao; Zhiqiang Bao; Zhigang Yin; Bin Guo; Junyou Wang; Lin Tan; Yuguang Zhang; Hai Xing	2018	Bayin-Gobi Formation (Early Cretaceous, Albian)	China (Inner Mongolia)	Known from a well-preserved, almost complete skeleton	
Beg	Congyu Yu; Albert Prieto-Márquez; Tsogtbaatar Chinzorig; Zorigt Badamkhatan; Mark A. Norell	2020	Ulaanoosh Formation (Early Cretaceous to Late Cretaceous, Albian to Cenomanian)	Mongolia (Ömnögovi)	Its skull has a rugose texture	
Beibeilong	Hanyong Pu; Darla K. Zelenitsky; Junchang Lü; Philip J. Currie; Kenneth Carpenter; Li Xu; Eva B. Koppelhus; Songhai Jia; Le Xiao; Huali Chuang; Tianran Li; Martin Kundrát; Caizhi Shen	2017	Gaogou Formation (Late Cretaceous, Cenomanian to Coniacian)	China (Henan)	Known from only a single embryo still in its egg	
Beiguornis	Xuri Wang; Shubin Ju; Wensheng Wu; Yichuan Liu; Zheng Guo; Qiang Ji	2022	Longjiang Formation (Early Cretaceous, Barremian to Aptian)	China (Inner Mongolia)	Had a short but robust manual ungual	
Beipiaognathus	Yuanchao Hu; Xuri Wang; Jiandong Huang	2016	Yixian Formation (Early Cretaceous, Barremian)	China (Liaoning)	Described based on a chimeric holotype including compsognathid elements	
Beipiaopterus	Junchang Lü	2003	Yixian Formation (Early Cretaceous, Barremian)	China (Liaoning)	Known from a single specimen with extensive soft tissue preservation	
Beipiaosaurus	Xing Xu; Zhilu Tang; Xiaolin Wang	1999	Yixian Formation (Early Cretaceous, Barremian)	China (Liaoning)	Preserves evidence of downy feathers as well as a secondary coat of simpler "elongated broad filamentous feathers" or EBFFs	
Beishanlong	Peter J. Makovicky; Daqing Li; Keqin Gao; Matthew Lewin; Gregory M. Erickson; Mark A. Norell	2010	Xiagou Formation (Early Cretaceous, Aptian)	China (Gansu)	Lacked the elongated claws of more derived ornithomimosaurs	
Bellubrunnus	David W. E. Hone; Helmut Tischlinger; Eberhard Frey; Martin Röper	2012	Torleite Formation (Late Jurassic, Kimmeridgian)	Germany (Bavaria)	Its wingtips pointed forwards, which is probably an aerodynamic adaptation	
Bellulornis	Min Wang; Zhonghe Zhou; Shuang Zhou	2016	Jiufotang Formation (Early Cretaceous, Aptian)	China (Liaoning)	Originally named Bellulia, but this was preoccupied by a moth	
Bellusaurus	Zhiming Dong	1990	Shishugou Formation (Middle Jurassic to Late Jurassic, Callovian to Oxfordian)	China (Xinjiang)	Known from a bone bed with the remains of seventeen juvenile specimens	
Bennettazhia	Lev A. Nessov	1991	Hudspeth Formation (Early Cretaceous to Late Cretaceous, Albian to Cenomanian)	United States (Oregon)	May have been a mollusc eater that lived in large rookeries like seagulls	
Berberosaurus	Ronan Allain; Ronald S. Tykoski; Najat Aquesbi; Nour-Eddine Jalil; Michel Monbaron; Dale A. Russell; Philippe Taquet	2007	Azilal Formation (Early Jurassic, Toarcian)	Morocco (Drâa-Tafilalet)	One of the oldest known ceratosaurs	
Bergamodactylus	Alexander W. A. Kellner	2015	Calcare di Zorzino (Late Triassic, Norian)	Italy (Lombardy)	Possibly synonymous with Carniadactylus	
Berthasaura	Geovane A. de Souza; Marina B. Soares; Luiz C. Weinschütz; Everton Wilner; Ricardo T. Lopes; Olga M. O. de Araújo; Alexander W. A. Kellner	2021	Goio-Erê Formation (Early Cretaceous, Aptian to Albian)	Brazil (Paraná)	Possessed a short, toothless beak as adults, indicating a herbivorous or omnivorous diet	
Betasuchus	Friedrich von Huene	1932	Maastricht Formation (Late Cretaceous, Maastrichtian)	Netherlands (Limburg)	The first terrestrial vertebrate named from the Maastrichtian stage	
Bicentenaria	Fernando E. Novas; Martín D. Ezcurra; Federico L. Agnolín; Diego Pol; Raúl Ortíz	2012	Candeleros Formation (Late Cretaceous, Cenomanian)	Argentina (Río Negro)	Several individuals were preserved together, suggesting a gregarious lifestyle	
Bienosaurus	Zhiming Dong	2001	Lufeng Formation (Early Jurassic, Sinemurian)	China (Yunnan)	Potentially synonymous with Tatisaurus	
Bissektipelta	Jolyon C. Parish; Paul M. Barrett	2004	Bissekty Formation (Late Cretaceous, Turonian)	Uzbekistan (Navoiy)	Has been suggested to be a filter feeder	
Bistahieversor	Thomas D. Carr; Thomas E. Williamson	2010	Fruitland Formation (Late Cretaceous, Campanian); Kirtland Formation (Late Cretaceous, Campanian)*	United States (New Mexico)	Analysis of its braincase suggests it behaved like tyrannosaurids despite likely not being a member of that family	
Bisticeratops	Sebastian G. Dalman; Steven E. Jasinski; Spencer G. Lucas	2022	Kirtland Formation (Late Cretaceous, Campanian)	United States (New Mexico)	Preserves bite marks from a tyrannosaurid	
Blasisaurus	Penélope Cruzado-Caballero; Xabier Pereda-Suberbiola; José Ignacio Ruiz-Omeñaca	2010	Arén Formation (Late Cretaceous, Campanian to Maastrichtian)	Spain (Aragon)	Only known from a partial skull but can be distinguished from contemporary lambeosaurines	
Blikanasaurus	Peter M. Galton; Jacques Van Heerden	1985	Lower Elliot Formation (Late Triassic, Norian)	South Africa (Eastern Cape)	A "hyper-robust" form that niche partitioned with other sauropodomorphs from its locality	
Bogolubovia	Lev A. Nessov; Alexander A. Yarkov	1989	Rybushka Formation (Late Cretaceous, Campanian)	Russia (Penza Oblast; Saratov Oblast*)	Once considered a species of Pteranodon	
Bohaiornis	Dongyu Hu; Li Li; Lianhai Hou; Xing Xu	2011	Jiufotang Formation (Early Cretaceous, Aptian)	China (Liaoning)	Originally considered to have been preserved with gastroliths, although later these were found to be mineral concretions	
Bolong	Wenhao Wu; Pascal Godefroit; Dongyu Hu	2010	Yixian Formation (Early Cretaceous, Barremian)	China (Liaoning)	Described from only a skull, with an almost complete skeleton described later	
Boluochia	Zhonghe Zhou	1995	Jiufotang Formation (Early Cretaceous, Aptian)	China (Liaoning)	Originally mistakenly believed to have possessed a hooked beak	
Bonapartenykus	Federico L. Agnolín; Jaime E. Powell; Fernando E. Novas; Martin Kundrát	2012	Allen Formation (Late Cretaceous, Campanian to Maastrichtian)	Argentina (Río Negro)	Its holotype was preserved with two eggs that may have been within its oviducts when it died	
Bonapartesaurus	Penélope Cruzado-Caballero; Jaime E. Powell	2017	Allen Formation (Late Cretaceous, Campanian to Maastrichtian)	Argentina (Río Negro)	Belongs to the Austrokritosauria, a clade of hadrosaurids endemic to South America	
Bonatitan	Agustín G. Martinelli; Analía M. Forasiepi	2004	Allen Formation (Late Cretaceous, Campanian to Maastrichtian)	Argentina (Río Negro)	Analysis of its inner ear suggests a decreased range of head movements compared to other sauropods	
Bonitasaura	Sebastián Apesteguía	2004	Bajo de la Carpa Formation (Late Cretaceous, Santonian)	Argentina (Río Negro)	The proportions of its body were somewhat similar to those of diplodocoids, likely through convergent evolution	
Borealopelta	Caleb M. Brown; Donald M. Henderson; Jakob Vinther; Ian Fletcher; Ainara Sistiaga; Jorsua Herrera; Roger E. Summons	2017	Clearwater Formation (Early Cretaceous, Albian)	Canada (Alberta)	So well-preserved that several osteoderms, keratin, pigments, and stomach contents are preserved in the positions they would have been in while alive, without flattening or shriveling	
Borealosaurus	Hailu You; Qiang Ji; Matthew C. Lamanna; Jinglu Li; Yinxian Li	2004	Sunjiawan Formation (Late Cretaceous, Cenomanian)	China (Liaoning)	Its caudal vertebrae were distinctively opisthocoelous	
Boreonykus	Phil R. Bell; Philip J. Currie	2016	Wapiti Formation (Late Cretaceous, Campanian to Maastrichtian)	Canada (Alberta)	One of the few dromaeosaurids known from high latitudes	
Boreopterus	Junchang Lü; Ji Qiang	2005	Yixian Formation (Early Cretaceous, Barremian)	China (Liaoning)	May have foraged while swimming using its large interlocking teeth to trap fish	
Borogovia	Halszka Osmolska	1987	Nemegt Formation (Late Cretaceous, Maastrichtian)	Mongolia (Ömnögovi)	Had a uniquely straight, flattened sickle claw, which may have had a weight-bearing function	
Bothriospondylus	Richard Owen	1875	Kimmeridge Clay (Late Jurassic, Kimmeridgian)	England (Wiltshire)	Several specimens have been assigned to this genus, but most of them have been reclassified into different genera	
Brachiosaurus	Elmer S. Riggs	1903	Morrison Formation (Late Jurassic, Kimmeridgian to Tithonian)	United States (Colorado*; Oklahoma; Utah; Wyoming)	A high browser with a tall chest and elongated forelimbs	
Brachyceratops	Charles W. Gilmore	1914	Two Medicine Formation (Late Cretaceous, Campanian)	United States (Montana)	Only known from juvenile remains, with one subadult since proven to belong to Styracosaurus	
Brachylophosaurus	Charles M. Sternberg	1953	Judith River Formation (Late Cretaceous, Campanian); Oldman Formation (Late Cretaceous, Campanian)*	Canada (Alberta*); United States (Montana)	Several specimens preserve extensive soft tissue remains	
Brachypodosaurus	Dhirendra K. Chakravarti	1934	Lameta Formation (Late Cretaceous, Maastrichtian)	India (Madhya Pradesh)	Has been suggested to be a thyreophoran, but such an identification is unlikely	
Brachytrachelopan	Oliver W. M. Rauhut; Kristian Remes; Regina Fechner; Gerardo Cladera; Pablo F. Puerta	2005	Cañadón Calcáreo Formation (Late Jurassic, Oxfordian to Tithonian)	Argentina (Chubut)	Possessed the shortest neck of any known sauropod	
Bradycneme	Colin J. O. Harrison; Cyril A. Walker	1975	Sânpetru Formation (Late Cretaceous, Maastrichtian)	Romania (Hunedoara)	Potentially an alvarezsaurid	
Brasileodactylus	Alexander W. A. Kellner	1984	Romualdo Formation (Early Cretaceous, Albian)	Brazil (Ceará)	May not have had crests on the snout, unlike most similar pterosaurs	
Brasilotitan	Elaine B. Machado; Leonardo S. Avilla; William R. Nava; Diogenes A. Campos; Alexander W. A. Kellner	2013	Adamantina Formation (Late Cretaceous, Maastrichtian)	Brazil (São Paulo)	Had an L-shaped dentary similar to that of Antarctosaurus and Bonitasaura	
Bravasaurus	E. Martín Hechenleitner; Léa Leuzinger; Agustín G. Martinelli; Sebastián Rocher; Lucas E. Fiorelli; Jeremías R. A. Taborda; Leonardo Salgado	2020	Ciénaga del Río Huaco Formation (Late Cretaceous, Campanian to Maastrichtian)	Argentina (La Rioja)	Discovered close to a large concentration of titanosaur eggs	
Bravoceratops	Steven L. Wick; Thomas M. Lehman	2013	Javelina Formation (Late Cretaceous, Maastrichtian)	United States (Texas)	Suggested to have had a single small horn on the top of its frill but this may be inaccurate	
Breviceratops	Sergei M. Kurzanov	1990	Baruungoyot Formation (Late Cretaceous, Maastrichtian)	Mongolia (Ömnögovi)	Only known from juvenile remains but can be distinguished from other protoceratopsids	
Brevidentavis	Jingmai K. O'Connor; Thomas A. Stidham; Jerald D. Harris; Matthew C. Lamanna; Alida M. Bailleul; Han Hu; Min Wang; Hailu You	2022	Xiagou Formation (Early Cretaceous, Aptian)	China (Gansu)	May be an early hesperornithean based on characters of the teeth	
Brevirostruavis	Zhiheng Li; Min Wang; Thomas A. Stidham; Zhonghe Zhou; Julia A. Clarke	2022	Jiufotang Formation (Early Cretaceous, Aptian)	China (Liaoning)	Possessed an enlarged hyoid that suggests a feeding specialization similar to hummingbirds, honeyeaters, or woodpeckers	
Brighstoneus	Jeremy A. F. Lockwood; David M. Martill; Susannah C.R. Maidment	2021	Wessex Formation (Early Cretaceous, Barremian)	England (Isle of Wight)	Had a long snout tipped with a low bump	
Brodavis	Larry D. Martin; Evgeny N. Kurochkin; Tim T. Tokaryk	2012	Frenchman Formation (Late Cretaceous, Maastrichtian)*; Hell Creek Formation (Late Cretaceous, Maastrichtian); Nemegt Formation (Late Cretaceous, Maastrichtian)	Canada (Saskatchewan*); Mongolia (Ömnögovi); United States (South Dakota)	Unlike most hesperornitheans, it lived in freshwater and was probably capable of flight	
Brohisaurus	M. Sadiq Malkani	2003	Sembar Formation (Late Jurassic, Kimmeridgian)	Pakistan (Balochistan)	Originally thought to be a sauropod, but several osteoderms potentially referrable to the genus suggest it may have actually been an ankylosaur	
Brontomerus	Michael P. Taylor; Mathew J. Wedel; Richard L. Cifelli	2011	Cedar Mountain Formation (Early Cretaceous, Aptian)	United States (Utah)	Possessed an enlarged ilium which supported powerful leg muscles, which it may have used to kick away predators	
Brontosaurus	Othniel C. Marsh	1879	Morrison Formation (Late Jurassic, Kimmeridgian to Tithonian)	United States (Utah; Wyoming*)	Popularly associated with Apatosaurus but a study of diplodocids found enough differences for it to be classified as a separate genus	
Bruhathkayosaurus	P. M. Yadagiri; Krishnan Ayyasami	1987	Kallamedu Formation (Late Cretaceous, Maastrichtian)	India (Tamil Nadu)	Reportedly exceptionally large, with its lost fossils having been informally speculated to be misidentified tree trunks before later research suggested at least the tibia is real	
Buitreraptor	Peter J. Makovicky; Sebastián Apesteguía; Federico L. Agnolín	2005	Candeleros Formation (Late Cretaceous, Cenomanian)	Argentina (Río Negro)	May have been a pursuit predator due to its long legs	
Burianosaurus	Daniel Madzia; Clint A. Boyd; Martin Mazuch	2018	Peruc–Korycany Formation (Late Cretaceous, Cenomanian)	Czech Republic (Central Bohemia)	May be closely allied to the rhabdodontids	
Buriolestes	Sergio F. Cabreira; Alexander W. A. Kellner; Sérgio Dias-da-Silva; Lúcio R. da Silva; Mario Bronzati; Júlio C. A. Marsola; Rodrigo T. Müller; Jonathas S. Bittencourt; Brunna J. Batista; Tiago Raugust; Rodrigo Carrilho; André Brodt; Max C. Langer	2016	Candelária Sequence (Late Triassic, Carnian)	Brazil (Rio Grande do Sul)	Unlike all other sauropodomorphs, it was completely carnivorous, with serrated teeth to match	
Bustingorrytitan	María Edith Simón; Leonardo J. Salgado	2023	Huincul Formation (Late Cretaceous, Cenomanian)	Argentina (Neuquén)	Large yet distantly related to other gigantic titanosaurs	
Byronosaurus	Mark A. Norell; Peter J. Makovicky; James M. Clark	2000	Djadokhta Formation (Late Cretaceous, Campanian)	Mongolia (Ömnögovi)	Two juvenile skulls were found in an oviraptorid nest and claimed to be evidence of nest parasitism in this taxon, but both their identity and taphonomy have been questioned	

== See also ==
- List of Mesozoic bird-line archosaur genera (C–F)
- List of Mesozoic bird-line archosaur genera (G–K)
- List of Mesozoic bird-line archosaur genera (L–O)
- List of Mesozoic bird-line archosaur genera (P–S)
- List of Mesozoic bird-line archosaur genera (T–Z)
