= Catenoleimus =

Catenoleimus Temporal range: Turonian, 90 Ma

Scientific classification
- Kingdom: Animalia
- Phylum: Chordata
- Class: Reptilia
- Clade: Dinosauria
- Clade: Saurischia
- Clade: Theropoda
- Clade: Avialae
- Clade: †Enantiornithes
- Genus: †Catenoleimus; Panteleyev, 1998
- Species: †C. anachoretus

Binomial name
- †Catenoleimus anachoretus Panteleyev, 1998

Extinct genus of birds

Catenoleimus is a prehistoric bird genus from the Late Cretaceous. It lived during the mid-late Turonian stage, around 90 million years ago. A single species Catenoleimus anachoretus has been described, and this is only known from one piece of coracoid (specimen PO 4606), found in the Bissekty Formation of the Kyzyl Kum in present-day Uzbekistan.

This bird appears to be a mid-sized enantiornithine, perhaps 20–25 cm long in life. The morphology of the bone is rather plesiomorphic compared to contemporary Enantiornithes.
