= Zhyraornis =

Zhyraornis Temporal range: Turonian, 92 Ma

Scientific classification
- Kingdom: Animalia
- Phylum: Chordata
- Clade: Euornithes
- Suborder: †Zhyraornithi; Nesov, 1992
- Family: †Zhyraornithidae; Nesov, 1984
- Genus: †Zhyraornis; Nesov, 1984

Type species
- †Zhyraornis kashkarovi Nesov, 1984

Species
- †Z. kashkarovi Nesov, 1984; †Z. logunovi Nesov, 1992

Extinct genus of dinosaurs

Zhyraornis is a genus of prehistoric bird from the late Cretaceous period (middle Turonian, 92 mya). Its fossils have been found in Bissekty Formation deposits near Dzharakuduk in the Kyzyl Kum, Uzbekistan. Two species have been assigned to this genus: Zhyraornis kashkarovi and Zhyraornis logunovi. Both are known only from partial pelvic bones (synsacra).

== Classification ==
The relationships of this bird are unresolved. Paleontologist Lev Nesov originally classified in a distinct family (Zhyraornithidae) and later suborder (Zhyraornithi) within the order Ichthyornithiformes. Kurochkin (1996) considered it to belong to the Enantiornithes, specifically the family Alexornithidae. In 2006, Kurochkin re-classified it as a primitive member of the lineage leading to modern birds, the Ornithuromorpha.
