= Abavornis =

Abavornis Temporal range: Turonian, 92 Ma

Scientific classification
- Kingdom: Animalia
- Phylum: Chordata
- Class: Reptilia
- Clade: Dinosauria
- Clade: Saurischia
- Clade: Theropoda
- Clade: Avialae
- Clade: †Enantiornithes
- Genus: †Abavornis; Panteleev, 1998
- Species: †A. bonaparti

Binomial name
- †Abavornis bonaparti Panteleev, 1998

Extinct genus of birds

Abavornis is the name given to a genus of primitive birds from the Late Cretaceous, containing the single species A. bonaparti (named in honor of the Argentine paleontologist José Bonaparte). It was probably a member of the Enantiornithes, but as it is only known from a single broken coracoid (TsNIGRI 56/11915), which, however, looks typically enantiornithine, that assignment is tentative. The fossil is from Late Cretaceous Bissekty Formation (Turonian, 92 MYA) in the Kyzylkum, Uzbekistan. Another partial coracoid (PO 4605) is very similar and is referred to as Abavornis sp.; it might belong to A. bonaparti and if so show some features which are damaged in the holotype.
