= Zholsuchus =

Zholsuchus Temporal range: Turonian

Scientific classification
- Kingdom: Animalia
- Phylum: Chordata
- Class: Reptilia
- Clade: Archosauria
- Clade: Pseudosuchia
- Clade: Crocodylomorpha
- Family: †Goniopholididae
- Genus: †Zholsuchus; Nessov et al., 1989

Type species
- Z. procevus Nessov et al., 1989

Extinct genus of reptiles

Zholsuchus is a genus of crocodyliform that may have been a goniopholidid mesoeucrocodylian, but is only known from scanty material (a right premaxilla, one of the bones of the tip of the snout). This specimen was found in the Turonian-age Upper Cretaceous Bissekty Formation of Dzharakhuduk, Uzbekistan. Zholsuchus was described in 1989 by Lev Nessov and colleagues. The type species is Z. procevus.

A 2000 review by Glenn Storrs and Mikhail Efimov designated Zholsuchus a dubious name, while a 2022 study found that Zholsuchus is a valid taxon by the traits assigned to the specimens assigned to Zholsuchus, and showed affiliations with crown-group crocodylians.
