= Lenesornis =

Lenesornis Temporal range: Turonian, 90 Ma

Scientific classification
- Kingdom: Animalia
- Phylum: Chordata
- Class: Reptilia
- Clade: Dinosauria
- Clade: Saurischia
- Clade: Theropoda
- Clade: Avialae
- Clade: †Enantiornithes
- Genus: †Lenesornis; Kurochkin, 1996
- Species: †L. maltshevskyi

Binomial name
- †Lenesornis maltshevskyi (Nesov, 1986 [originally Ichthyornis)

Synonyms
- Ichthyornis maltshevskyi Nesov, 1986

Extinct genus of birds

Lenesornis is a genus of enantiornithine birds which lived during the Late Cretaceous about 90 Ma and is known from fossils found in the Bissekty Formation in the Kyzyl Kum, Uzbekistan.
