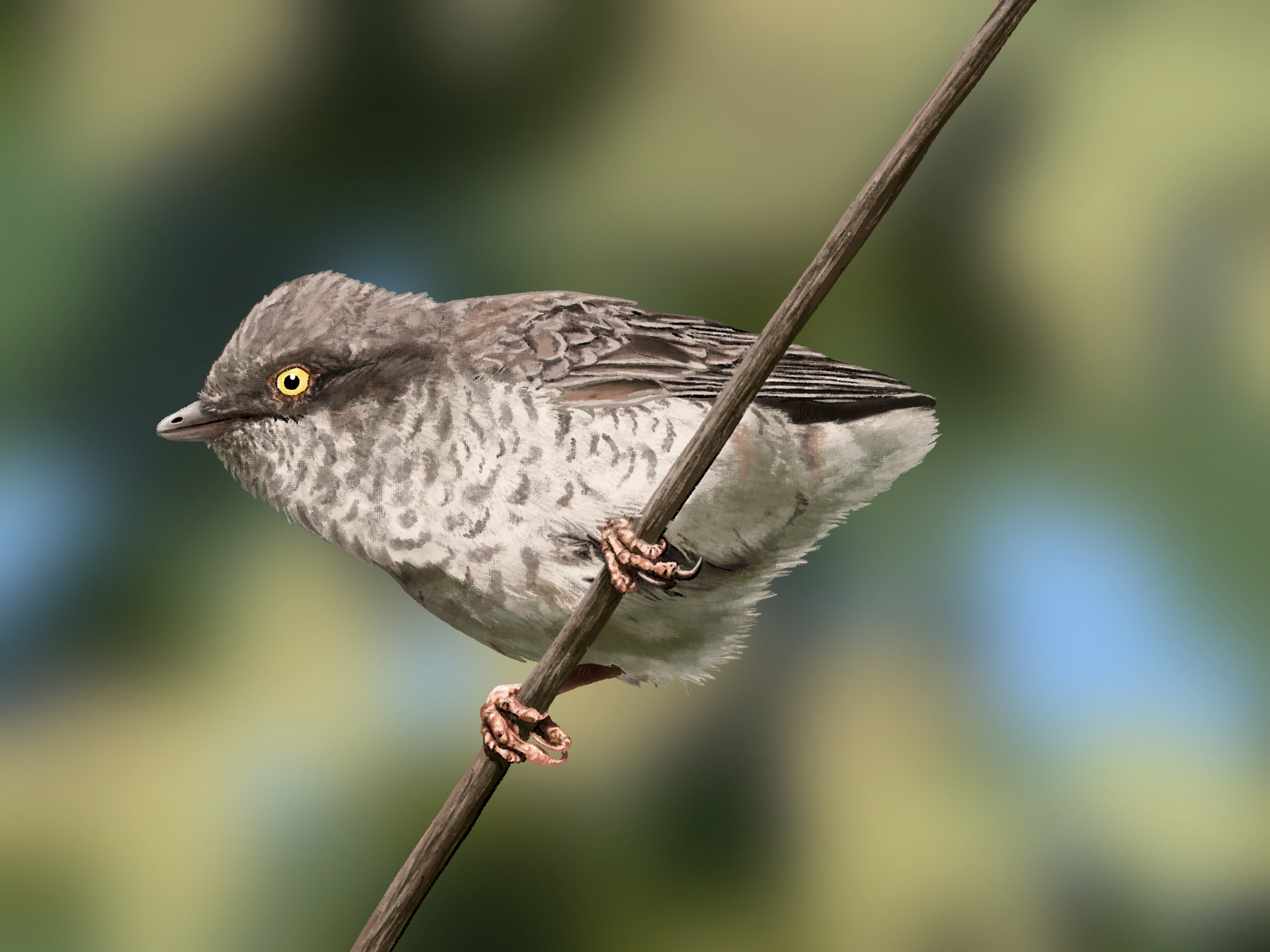
- Life reconstruction of Alexornis antecedens

Scientific classification
- Kingdom: Animalia
- Phylum: Chordata
- Class: Reptilia
- Clade: Dinosauria
- Clade: Saurischia
- Clade: Theropoda
- Clade: Avialae
- Clade: †Enantiornithes
- Order: †Alexornithiformes; Brodkorb, 1976
- Family: †Alexornithidae; Brodkorb, 1976
- Genus: †Alexornis; Brodkorb, 1976
- Species: †A. antecedens

Binomial name
- †Alexornis antecedens Brodkorb, 1976

= Alexornis =

Alexornis Temporal range: Late Cretaceous

Extinct genus of birds

Alexornis is an extinct genus of enantiornithine birds from the Late Cretaceous aged La Bocana Roja Formation of Baja California, Mexico. The type and only known species is Alexornis antecedens. The scientific name as a whole means "Alex's ancestral bird"; Alexornis from the given name of ornithologist Alexander Wetmore + Ancient Greek ornis, "bird", and antecedens, Latin for "going before" or "ancestral".

A. antecedens is known only from a single fragmentary skeleton including shoulder, wing, and leg bones, but lacking a skull. It was about the size of a sparrow, weighing only about 35.6 grams (1.26 oz). The specimen was discovered in 1971 and formally described in 1976 by Pierce Brodkorb. Brodkorb considered the species to be similar to some modern birds, and at the time, recognized it as one of the few known Cretaceous "land birds" after Gobipteryx minuta, as most other Cretaceous birds at the time were thought to be aquatic or semi-aquatic.

== Classification ==
Alexornis was originally described as an early member of the modern bird group and, more specifically, as a possible ancestor of the orders Coraciiformes (kingfishers and relatives) and Piciformes (woodpeckers and relatives). However, when the first recognized enantiornithine fossils were discovered, it soon became clear that Alexornis was an additional member of this group. Enantiornithes are characterized by a reversed articulation of the scapula and coracoid bones in the shoulder, and in 1983 Larry Martin showed that Brodkorb has accidentally switched these two bones in his original description, confused by their reversed anatomy.

In the past, Alexornis has been allied with the similarly sized Central Asian genus Kizylkumavis, based on characteristics which are known to unite them with other Cretaceous birds in the group Enantornithes. Evgeny Kurochkin argued in 1996 that Alexornis formed a natural group, the Alexornithidae, with Kizylkumavis and a second type of central Asian bird, Sazavis. Among the enantiornithes, Alexornis shares many similarities of its skeletal anatomy with South American birds from about the same time period, including Martinavis and Elbretornis, and is united with them in the group Euenantiornithes.
