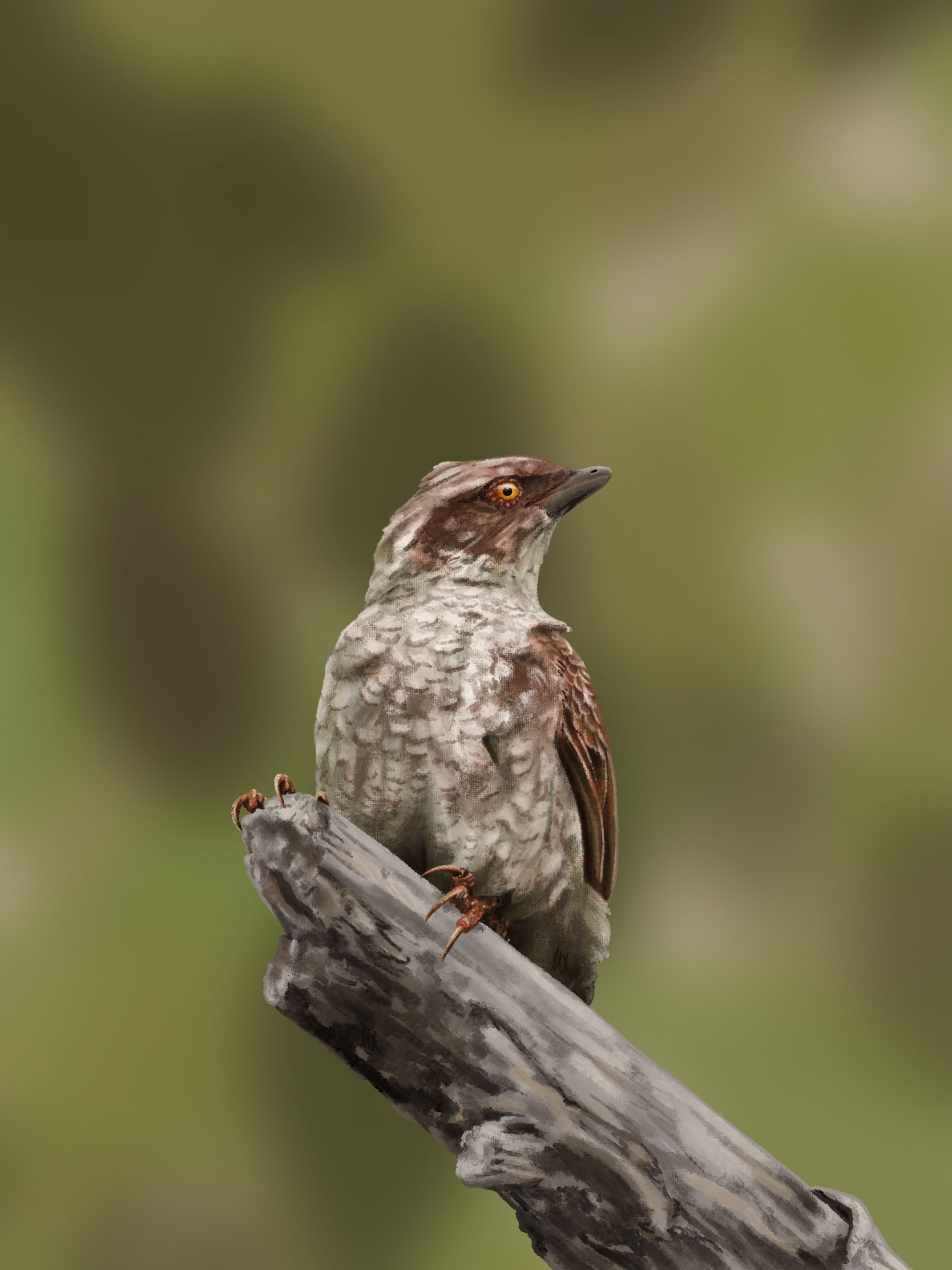
- Life reconstruction of Sazavis prisca

Scientific classification
- Kingdom: Animalia
- Phylum: Chordata
- Class: Reptilia
- Clade: Dinosauria
- Clade: Saurischia
- Clade: Theropoda
- Clade: Avialae
- Clade: †Enantiornithes
- Genus: †Sazavis; Nesov, 1989 vide Nesov & Jarkov, 1989
- Species: †S. prisca

Binomial name
- †Sazavis prisca Nesov, 1989 vide Nesov & Jarkov, 1989

= Sazavis =

Sazavis Temporal range: Turonian, 93.5–89.3 Ma

Extinct genus of birds

Sazavis was an enantiornithine bird from the Late Cretaceous. It might have been related to Nanantius and lived in what is now the Kyzyl Kum of Uzbekistan. There is a single species known to date, Sazavis prisca.

== Etymology ==
The generic name is composed of the Kazakh саз (saz) ("clay") and the Latin avis ("bird"), referring to the clay depression of Uzbekistan, near which this bird was discovered. The name is derived from the Latin priscus and means "ancient."

== Description ==
It is only known from a single piece of tibiotarsus about 4.5 mm (0.18 in) wide in a distal joint.

The bone has been found in the Bissekty Formation. The bird was the size of a pigeon, approximately 18.5 cm (7.3 in) long in life.

== Paleoecology ==
Sazavis possibly lived on nearby coasts or in the liman forests dominated by the flowering plants of the Platanaceae family.
