= La Bocana Roja Formation =

Geological formation in Baja California, Mexico

- Stratigraphic range: Late Cretaceous
- Type: Geological formation
- Underlies: Punta Baja Formation

Location
- Region: North America

La Bocana Roja Formation is a geological formation in Baja California, Mexico. Its strata date back to the Late Cretaceous, although the precise age is unclear. Dinosaur remains have been recovered from the formation.

== Vertebrate paleofauna ==
Color key: Taxon / Reclassified taxon / Taxon falsely reported as present / Dubious taxon or junior synonym / Ichnotaxon / Ootaxon / Morphotaxon	Notes; Uncertain or tentative taxa are in small text; ~~crossed out~~ taxa are discredited.

Vertebrates reported from the La Bocana Roja Formation
Genus	Species	Location	Member	Material	Notes	Images
Alexornis	A. antecedens			"Postcranial elements."		Labocania
Hadrosauridae	Indeterminate			"bone fragments; humerus"		Labocania
Labocania	L. anomala			"Very fragmentary skull and postcrania."		Labocania
Lambeosaurinae	Indeterminate			"left ischium and fragment of left ilium, right jugal, dentary, radial fragment, scapula, ulna and fibula fragment, humerus, pedal ungual phalanx."	Probably belongs to one taxon.	Labocania

== See also ==
- List of dinosaur-bearing rock formations
