= Gavia moldavica =

Gavia moldavica Temporal range: Tortonian

Scientific classification
- Domain: Eukaryota
- Kingdom: Animalia
- Phylum: Chordata
- Class: Aves
- Order: Gaviiformes
- Family: Gaviidae
- Genus: Gavia
- Species: †G. moldavica

Binomial name
- †Gavia moldavica Kessler, 1984

Extinct species of loon

Gavia moldavica is an extinct species of small Late Miocene loon from Moldova.

== History ==
The species was found at Chișinău as part of fossil collecting survey in the aforementioned place, as well as Bujorul and Kalfa starting with 1974. The species was described by Eugene Kessler in 1984. The species name "moldavica" in honor of the country Moldova where the species was found.

== Description ==
Smaller than the extant and most of the fossil species of loons of the genus Gavia, the holotype LPUB 273/1 is a proximal fragment of a carpometacarpus. The bone is different from other members of Gavia in being less deep but well pronounced in some features. The paratypes (LPUB 273/2, LPUI 61 MS, LPUI 62 MS, and LPUI 64 MS) consisted of several fragmentary wingbones such as the humerus, the ulna, and the radius. These bones are also more gracile and smaller in appearance than the bones seen in other species.

== Classification ==
Classified as among the earliest member of the genus Gavia, the species might be basal member of a lineage of loons that includes the living black-throated loon (G. arctica) and the pacific loon (G. pacifica).

== Paleobiology ==
G. moldavica comes from the Tortonian age of the Miocene epoch. During this point in Earth's history much of Central Europe covered by a large, shallow inland sea known as the Paratethys. G. moldavica would have been a contemporary with various seabird and marine mammals whose fossil remains have been heavily documented.
