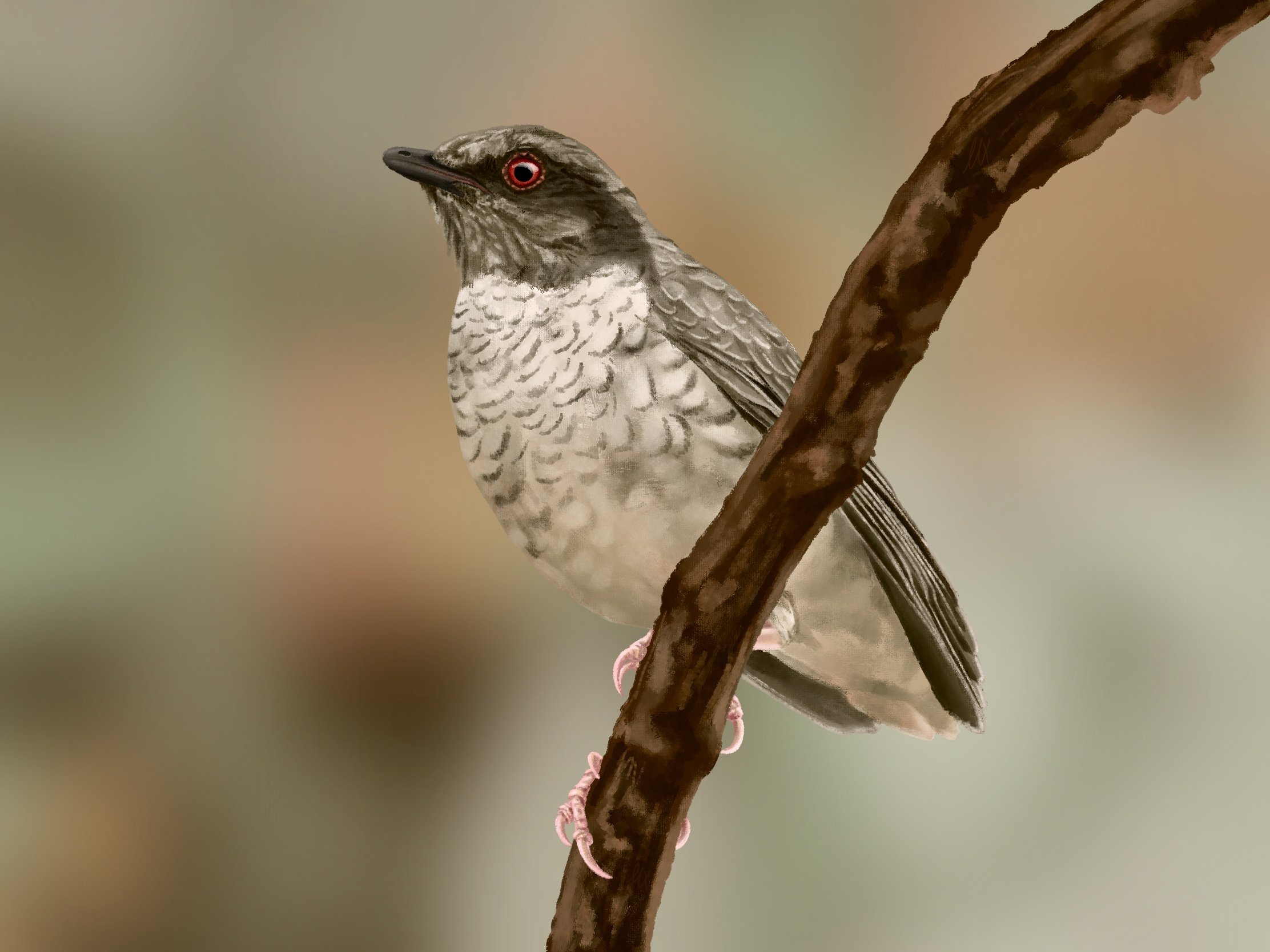
- Speculative life restoration of Kizylkumavis

Scientific classification
- Kingdom: Animalia
- Phylum: Chordata
- Class: Reptilia
- Clade: Dinosauria
- Clade: Saurischia
- Clade: Theropoda
- Clade: Avialae
- Clade: †Enantiornithes
- Genus: †Kizylkumavis; Nesov, 1984
- Species: †K. cretacea

Binomial name
- †Kizylkumavis cretacea Nesov, 1984

= Kizylkumavis =

Kizylkumavis Temporal range: Turonian, 90 Ma

Extinct genus of birds

Kizylkumavis is an extinct genus of enantiornithine birds known from the Late Cretaceous Bissekty Formation of the Kyzyl Kum in Uzbekistan.
