= Bissekty Formation =

Geological formation in Uzbekistan

- Stratigraphic range: Mid-Late Turonian; ~92–90 Ma
- Type: Geological formation
- Underlies: Aitym Formation
- Overlies: Dzheirantui Formation
- Thickness: up to 80 m (260 ft)

Lithology
- Primary: Sandstone
- Other: Conglomerate, mudstone, siltstone

Location
- Coordinates: 42.1°N 62.7°E
- Approximate paleocoordinates: 36.8°N 57.0°E
- Region: Navoiy & Xorazm Regions
- Country: Uzbekistan
- Extent: Kyzylkum Desert
- Bissekty Formation (Uzbekistan)

The Bissekty Formation (sometimes referred to as Bissekt) is a geologic formation and Lagerstätte which crops out in the Kyzyl Kum desert of Uzbekistan, and dates to the Late Cretaceous Period. Laid down in the mid to late Turonian, it is dated to about 92 to 90 Ma (million years ago).

== Description ==
The lithology of the sediment largely consists of cross bedded sandstones with interbeds of massive sandstone, well cemented intraformational conglomerate, siltstones and mudstones. Most of the fossils are found as clasts within the conglomerates.

== Fossil content ==
The Bissekty Formation is characterised by a mix of marine, brackish, freshwater, and terrestrial animal fossils. This stands in contrast the strictly marine fossils found in the underlying Dzheirantui Formation, and indicates that the Bissekty was formed during the regression of a saltwater sea. The coastline expanded inland again in the upper portion of the Bissekty, represented by a proportional increase of fully aquatic species, which were almost completely absent from the middle period of the formation. Semi-aquatic species remained abundant during this middle period, and the geology of the formations indicates that a braided river system took the place of the coastline. Eventually the area was again completely underwater, during the time period represented by the later Aitym Formation, which preserves coastal marine sediments.

=== Vertebrates ===
The Bissekty Formation is notable for preserving the most abundant Turonian land animal fossils in Eurasia, and the most diverse fauna of Late Cretaceous eutherians (placental mammals and relatives) in the world.

Listings and accompanying information are based on a survey of the Bissekty Formation published by Cory Redman and Lindsey Leighton in 2009 unless otherwise noted. Aquatic and semi-aquatic species are restricted to freshwater unless otherwise noted.

==== Amphibians ====
An indeterminate species of salamander-like albanerpetontid amphibian. An indeterminate gobiatid species.

Amphibians of the Bissekty Formation
Genus	Species	Location	Stratigraphic position	Abundance	Notes
Aralobatrachus	A. robustus				A frog
Eoscapherpeton	E. asiaticum				A scapherpetontid salamander
Gobiates	G. sosedkoi				A gobiatid frog
Gobiates	Gobiates spp.				Additional indeterminate species of Gobiates
Itemirella	I. cretacea				A possible discoglossid frog
Kizylkuma	K. antiqua				A possible discoglossid marine frog
Mynbulakia	M. surgai				A batrachosauroidid salamander
Nesovtriton	N. mynbulakensis				A cryptobranchoid salamander

==== Cartilaginous fish ====
Cartilaginous fishes of the Bissekty Formation
Genus	Species	Location	Stratigraphic position	Abundance	Notes	Images
Cretodus	C. crassidens				A marine Pseudoscapanorhynchid Lamniform shark	Cretodus crassidens
Heterodontus	Indeterminate				A marine bullhead shark	Horn shark (Heterodontus francisci)
Hispidaspis	Indeterminate				A sand shark tolerant of brackish water	
Hybodus	Indeterminate				A hybodontid tolerant of brackish water	
Ischyrhiza	I. serra				A sclerorhynchid tolerant of brackish water	
Myledaphus	M. tritus				A rhinobatoid tolerant of brackish water	Myledaphus skeleton
Polyacrodus	Indeterminate				A polyacrodontid tolerant of brackish water	
Scapanorhynchus	S. rhaphiodon				A goblin shark tolerant of brackish water	

==== Crocodylomorphs ====
Crocodylomorphs of the Bissekty Formation
Genus	Species	Location	Stratigraphic position	Abundance	Notes
Kansajsuchus	K. borealis				A possible goniopholidid mesoeucrocodylian
Tadzhikosuchus	T. macrodentis				A possible alligatoroid eusuchian
Zholsuchus	Z. procevus				A possible mesoeucrocodylian
Zhyrasuchus	Z. angustifrons				A possible eusuchian

==== Lizards ====
An indeterminate gekkonid. An indeterminate priscagamid. An indeterminate scincid.

Lizards of the Bissekty Formation
Genus	Species	Location	Stratigraphic position	Abundance	Notes
Buckantaus	B. crassidens				A macrocephalosaurid
Ekshmer	E. bissektensis				A priscagamid

==== Mammals and other therapsids ====
Mammaliaformes of the Bissekty Formation
Genus	Species	Location	Stratigraphic position	Abundance	Notes
Aspanlestes	A. aptap				A zhelestid
Bulaklestes	B. kezbe				An asioryctitherian
Daulestes	D. inobservabilis				An asioryctitherian
Daulestes	D. kulbeckensis				An asioryctitherian
Eoungulatum	E. kudukensis				A zhelestid
Kulbeckia	K. kulbecke				A zalambdalestid
Paranyctoides	P. quadrans				An eutherian
Parazhelestes	P. mynbulakensis				A zhelestid
Parazhelestes	P. robustus				A zhelestid
Shalbaatar	S. bakht				A symmetrodont
Sulestes	S. karakshi				A deltatheroid
Uchkudukodon	U. nessovi				An asioryctitherian
Uzbekbaatar	U. kizylkumensis				A cimolodont
Zhelestes	Z. temirkazyk				A zhelestid

==== Plesiosaurs ====
Plesiosaurs of the Bissekty Formation
Genus	Species	Location	Stratigraphic position	Abundance	Notes	Images
Plesiosauria	Indeterminate				Marine, possibly tolerant of brackish water	

==== Pterosaurs ====
Pterosaurs of the Bissekty Formation
Genus	Species	Location	Stratigraphic position	Abundance	Notes	Images
Azhdarcho	A. lancicollis	Dzhara-Kuduk	Taykarshinskaya unit		An azhdarchid	

==== Ray-finned fish ====
Based on Brinkman et al (2025):

Ray-finned fish of the Bissekty Formation
Genus	Species	Location	Stratigraphic position	Abundance	Notes	Images
Acanthomorpha indet.					An acanthomorph of uncertain affinities.	
Aidachar	A. paludalis				An ichthyodectiform tolerant of brackish water	
"Amia"	"A." limosa				A bowfin tolerant of brackish water. Potentially a nomen dubium, but some studies consider it valid.	
?Anguilliformes indet.					A potential eel of uncertain affinities.	
Arotus	A. hieroglyphus				A holostean, potentially a semionotiform, known from isolated scales.	
Atractosteus	A. turanensis				A gar tolerant of brackish water	
Belonostomus	B. aciculiferus				An aspidorhynchid	
Characiformes indet.					A characiform of uncertain affinities.	
Clupeiformes indet.					A clupeiform of uncertain affinities.	
cf. Coriops					An osteoglossomorph.	
Diplomystus	D. sp.				An ellimmichthyiform.	
Gonorynchiformes indet.					A gonorynchiform of uncertain affinities.	
Notogoneus	N. sp.				A beaked sandfish.	
cf. Paratarpon					An elopiform.	
Polyodontidae indet.					A paddlefish of uncertain affinities.	

==== Dinosaurs ====
===== Sauropods =====
Sauropods of the Bissekty Formation
Genus	Species	Location	Stratigraphic position	Material	Description	Images
Dzharatitanis	D. kingi			An anterior caudal vertebra.	Originally described as a rebbachisaurid, a later study has suggested it was lognkosaurian titanosaur	
Titanosauria	Indeterminate			CCMGE 628/12457, a braincase		

===== Ornithischians =====
Color key: Taxon / Reclassified taxon / Taxon falsely reported as present / Dubious taxon or junior synonym / Ichnotaxon / Ootaxon / Morphotaxon

Notes
Uncertain or tentative taxa are in small text
~~crossed out~~ taxa are discredited.

Ornithischians reported from the Bissekty Formation
Genus	Species	Location	Stratigraphic position	Material	Description	Images
Amtosaurus	A. archibaldi				Reclassified as Bissektipelta	
Bactrosaurus	B. kyslkumensis			"Fragmentary dentary [=maxilla], vertebrae, tibia."	Nomen dubium	
Bissektipelta	B. archibaldi			"Partial skull."	An ankylosaur	
Cionodon	C. kyslkumensis				Reclassified as Bactrosaurus kyslkumensis	
Gilmoreosaurus	G. arkhangelskyi				Nomen dubium	
Levnesovia	L. transoxiana			"Braincases"	A hadrosauroid	
Turanoceratops	T. tardabilis				A ceratopsian	

===== Theropods =====
An indeterminate tyrannosauroid species, known from isolated teeth.

====== Carcharodontosauridae ======
Carcharodontosaurs of the Bissekty Formation
Genus	Species	Location	Stratigraphic position	Material	Description	Images
Carcharodontosauridae	Indeterminate			A partial posterior dorsal vertebra		
Ulughbegsaurus	U. uzbekistanensis			A left maxilla, the ramus end of a left maxilla, and the posterior end of a right maxilla.	A carcharodontosaurid theropod	

====== Enantiornithines ======
Enantiornithines of the Bissekty Formation
Genus	Species	Location	Stratigraphic position	Material	Description	Images
Abavornis	A. bonaparti			Known from a partial coracoid	A possible enantiornithine. A possible second species of Abavornis in the Bissekty Formation is known from a partial coracoid.	
Catenoleimus	C. anachoretus				A possible enantiornithine	
Explorornis	E. nessovi				An enantiornithine. Possible third and fourth species of Explorornis in the Bissekty Formation are known from partial coracoids.	
Explorornis	E. walkeri			"Coracoid"	An enantiornithine. Possible third and fourth species of Explorornis in the Bissekty Formation are known from partial coracoids.	
Ichthyornis	I. minusculus			"Dorsal vertebra"	An enantiornithine originally but incorrectly identified as a species of Ichthyornis.	
Incolornis	I. martini			Known from a partial coracoid	A possible enantiornithine	
Incolornis	I. silvae			Known from a partial coracoid	A possible enantiornithine	
Kizylkumavis	K. cretacea			"Distal humerus"	An enantiornithine	
Kuszholia	K. mengi			"[Two] synsacra"	An enantiornithine	
Lenesornis	L. maltshevskyi			"Synsacrum"	A possible enantiornithine	
cf. Nanantius					An enantiornithine, similar to Nanantius eos	
Sazavis	S. prisca			"Distal tibiotarsus"	An enantiornithine	
Zhyraornis	Z. kashkarovi			"Synsacrum"		
Zhyraornis	Z. logunovi			"Synsacrum"		

====== Other theropods ======
Non-enantiornithine theropod dinosaurs of the Bissekty Formation
Genus	Species	Location	Stratigraphic position	Material	Description	Images
Caenagnathasia	C. martinsoni			"[Two] partial mandibles"	An elmisaurine caenagnathid	
Dzharacursor	D. bissektensis			Right femur of a juvenile (holotype) with partial cranial and postcranial material	An ornithomimosaur originally assigned to Archaeornithomimus	
Dzharaonyx	D. eski				An alvarezsaur	
Euronychodon	E. asiaticus			Isolated teeth	A possible troodontid	
Itemirus	I. medullaris			A single small, damaged fossil braincase	A dromaeosaurine	
Platanavis	P. nana			"Sacrum"		
Therizinosauroidea spp.	Indeterminate			Partial crania also preserving some teeth and some postcranial elements including pedal bones (from multiple individuals)	At least two different therizinosauroids	
Timurlengia	T. euotica			Two braincases, dentary, and miscellaneous postcranial elements (from multiple individuals)	A non-tyrannosaurid tyrannosauroid	
Urbacodon	Unnamed species			Isolated teeth	A troodontid	
Zhyraornis	Z. kashkarovi				A possible ornithurine	
Dromaeosauridae indet.	Indeterminate			Pedal phalanx	A large indeterminate dromaeosaurid	
Abelisauridae indet.	Indeterminate			Anterior dorsal neural arch	An undescribed abelisaurid	

==== Turtles ====
An indeterminate trionychid (soft-shell) turtle species that was tolerant of brackish water.

Turtles of the Bissekty Formation
Genus	Species	Location	Stratigraphic position	Abundance	Notes
"Adocus"	"Adocus" aksary				An adocid tolerant of brackish water
Anatolemys	Indeterminate				A "macrobaenid" tolerant of brackish water
Khunnuchelys	K. kizylkumensis				A trionychid tolerant of brackish water
Lindholmemys	L. elegans				A "lindholmemydid" tolerant of brackish water
Shachemys	S. ancestralis				An adocid tolerant of brackish water

=== Invertebrates ===
An indeterminate species of marine coral.

==== Arthropods ====
Arthropods of the Bissekty Formation
Genus	Species	Location	Stratigraphic position	Abundance	Notes
Linuparus	L. dzheirantuiensis			Marine	A spiny lobster

==== Molluscs ====
An indeterminate species of marine placenticeratid ammonite. An indeterminate species of marine teredinid shipworm. An indeterminate marine trigoniid bivalve. An indeterminate marine veneroid bivalve.

Molluscs of the Bissekty Formation
Genus	Species	Location	Stratigraphic position	Abundance	Notes
Crassatelites	Indeterminate				A marine crassatellid bivalve
Mytiloides	M. labiatus				A marine inoceramid bivalve
Plagiostoma	Indeterminate				A marine limoid bivalve
Quadratotrigonia	Indeterminate				A marine trigoniid bivalve
Xylophaga	Indeterminate				An indeterminate species of marine shipworm
