= Kyzylkum Desert =

Desert in Central Asia

- Qizilqum
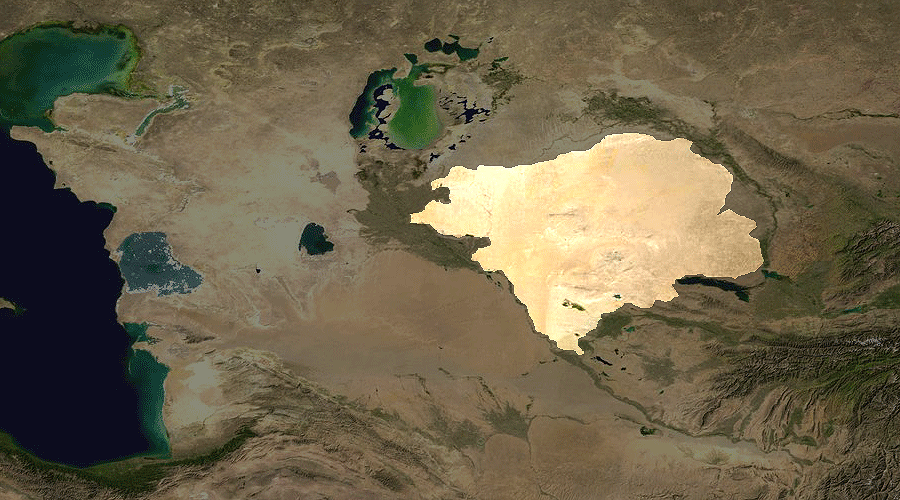
- Map of Kyzyl Kum

- Location within Uzbekistan Location within Kazakhstan
- Area: 298,000 km^{2} (115,000 mi^{2})

Geography
- Country: Kazakhstan and Uzbekistan
- Coordinates: 42°26′28″N 63°27′41″E
- Interactive map of Kyzylkum Desert

The Kyzylkum Desert (Uzbek: Qizilqum; Kazakh: Qyzylqūm) is the 15th largest desert in the world. Its name means 'Red Sand' in Turkic languages. It is located in Central Asia, in the land between the confluent rivers Amu Darya and Syr Darya, a region historically known as Transoxania. Today it is divided among Kazakhstan, Turkmenistan and Uzbekistan. It covers about 298,000 km^{2} (115,000 sq mi).

== Geography ==
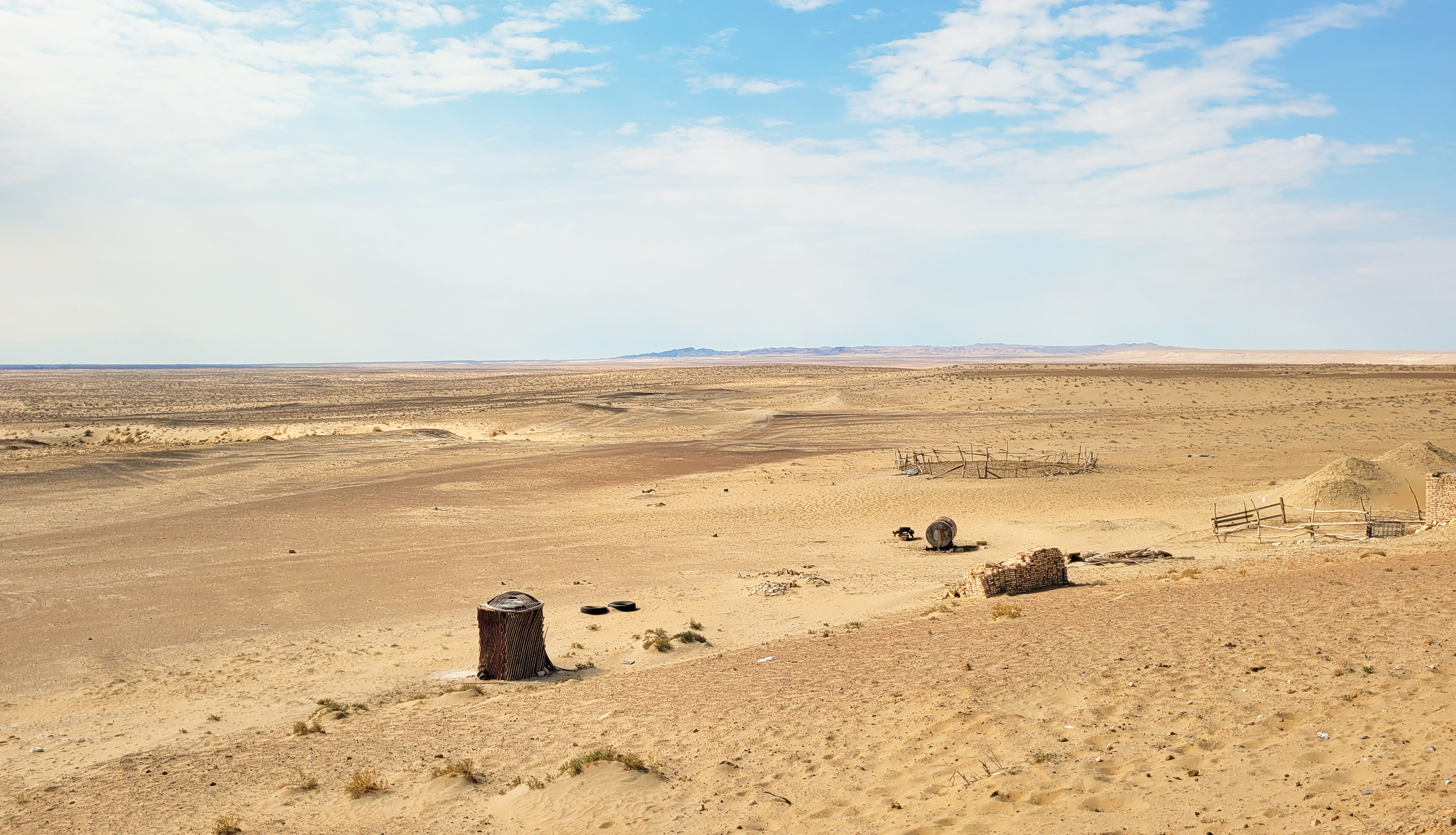
Kyzylkum Desert near Ayaz-Kala, Uzbekistan

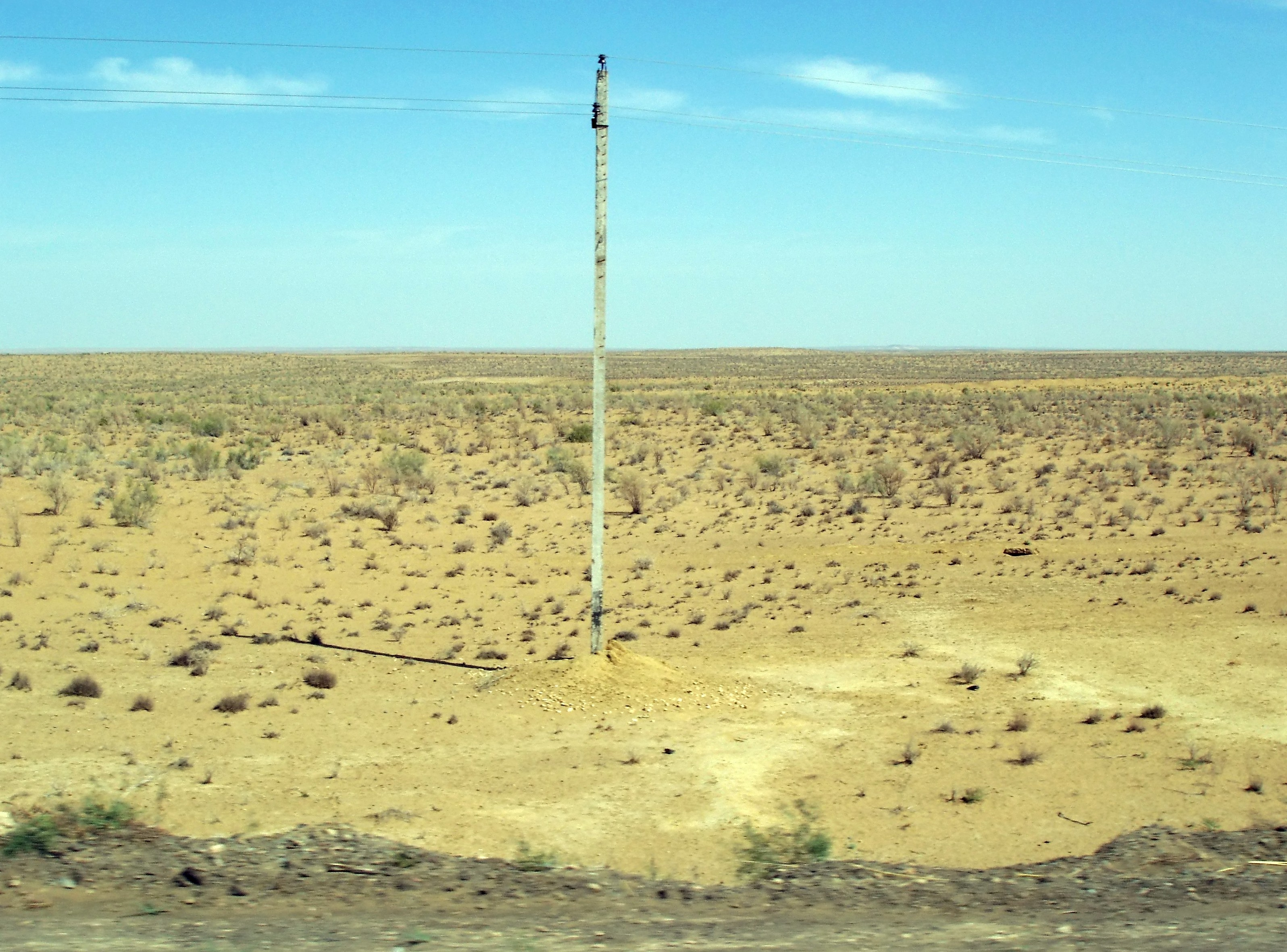
Kyzylkum Desert in Xorazm province, Uzbekistan

Kyzylkum is mainly located in Uzbekistan. Its territory consists mainly of an extensive plain at an altitude up to 300 m (980 ft) above sea level, with a number of depressions and highlands (Sultanuizdag, Bukantau). Most of the area is covered with dunes (barchans); in the northwest large areas are covered with takirs (clay coatings); there are also some oases. There are agricultural settlements along the rivers and in the oases. Temperatures can be very high during the summer months, from mid-May to mid-September. Kerki, one extreme inland city located on the banks of the Amu Darya River, recorded 52 °C (126 °F) in July 1983.

== Fauna ==
Desert fauna include the Russian tortoise (Testudo horsfieldii) and a large lizard known as the Transcaspian or desert monitor (Varanus griseus), which can reach lengths of 1.6 m (5.2 ft). The saiga antelope (Saiga tatarica) also occasionally migrates through the northern part of the desert.

Kyzylkum Nature Reserve in Bukhara Region was established in 1971. The area of the reserve amounts to 101,000 km^{2} (39,000 sq mi) and it is located on flood-land (tugai) drained by the Amudarya close to the settlement Dargan Ata. Fauna include: Bactrian deer (Cervus elaphus bactrianus), wild boar (Sus scrofa), common pheasant (Phasianus colchicus), golden eagle (Aquila chrysaetus).

Djeyran Reserve is located 40 km (25 mi) south of Bukhara. The total area of this reserve is 51,450 km^{2} (19,860 sq mi). It is a breeding centre for rare species such as goitered gazelle (Gazella subgutturosa), Przewalski's horse (Equus ferus przewalskii), Turkmenian kulan (Equus hemionus kulan) and MacQueen's bustard (Chlamydotis macqueenii). The reserve was founded in 1977 on the enclosed area in 5,131 ha (19.81 sq mi).

== Paleontology ==
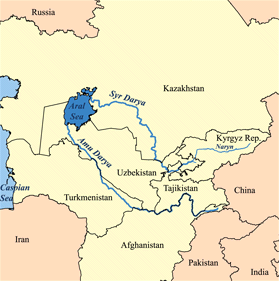
The Kyzylkum is between the Syr-Darya and Amu-Darya Rivers

The Kyzylkum Desert has exposed rock formations that have yielded a number of fossils. Of particular interest is the Bissekty Formation of Uzbekistan, from the early Late Cretaceous, which has produced several species of early birds: Incolornis martini, Explorornis walkeri, Kizylkumavis cretacea, Kuszholia mengi, Lenesornis kaskarovi, Sazavis prisca, Zhyraornis kaskarovi and Z. logunovi are recognized as valid species. Tyrannosaurid, therizinosaurid, ornithomimosaur, oviraptorosaurian, troodontid, ankylosaur, hadrosaur, and ceratopsian dinosaurs are also known from this rock unit. Other fossils from the Cretaceous rocks of the Kyzylkum include tree trunks, pelecypods, beetles, sharks, rays, bony fish, frogs, salamanders, turtles, crocodylomorphs, pterosaurs, and a varied fauna of small early mammals. Paleontologists that have worked in this area include J. David Archibald, Alexander Averianov, Sergei Kurzanov, Lev Nessov, Anatoly Riabinin, Anatoly Rozhdestvensky, and Hans-Dieter Sues.

== Economy ==
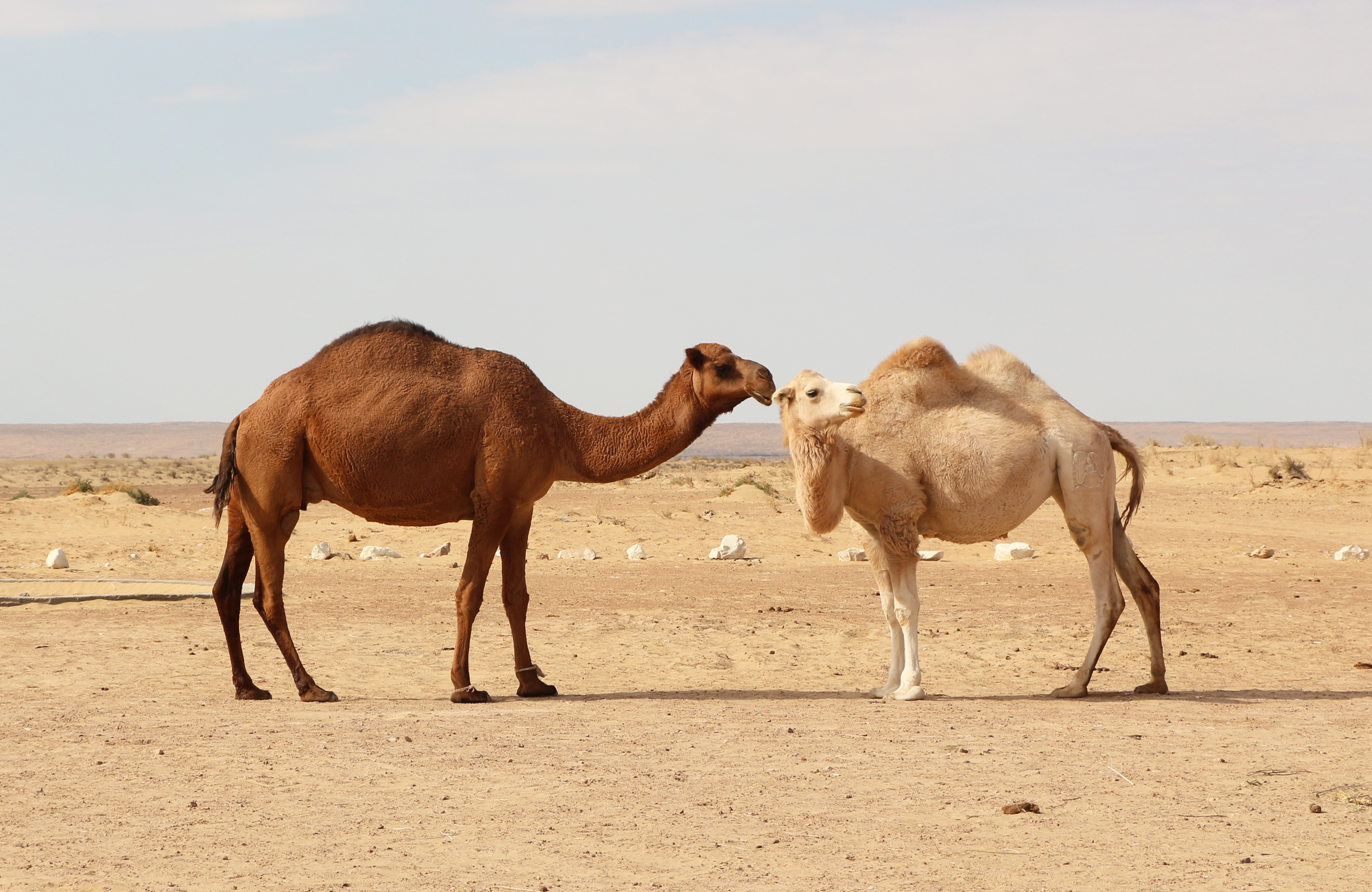
Dromedary and Bactrian camel in the Kyzylkum Desert

The local population uses the large spaces of the Kyzylkum Desert as a pasture for livestock (mostly sheep, Bactrian camels and dromedaries).

The desert is well known for its deposits of gold, uranium, copper, aluminium and silver, natural gas and oil. The development of the most famous gold-field at Muruntau began in the early 1970s. The centres for the mining and smelting industry at the region are Navoi, Zarafshan, Uchkuduk. The major industrial enterprises are: НГМК (Navoi Mining and Smelting Complex) and the Uzbek U.S.A. Joint Venture "Zarafshan-Newmont". The centres of the gas-production industry are Gazli and Mubarek.

== See also ==
- Andronovo culture
- Aydar Lake, large artificial lake
- Central Asian northern desert, an ecoregion largely corresponding with the Kyzylkum Desert
- Karakum Desert, another desert of Central Asia
- List of deserts by area
- Sarmishsay, ancient monuments of anthropogenic activity
