= Lists of dinosaur specimens =

Notable dinosaur specimens can individually increase science's knowledge about the life and world of the dinosaurs.

== By history ==
- List of lost, damaged, or destroyed dinosaur specimens
- List of dinosaur specimens sold at auction

== By preservation ==
- List of dinosaur specimens with documented taphonomic histories
- List of pathological dinosaur specimens
- List of dinosaur specimens preserved with agonistic and feeding traces
- List of dinosaur specimens with preserved soft tissue

== By taxonomic significance ==
=== By taxon ===
- Specimens of Archaeopteryx
- Specimens of Tyrannosaurus

=== Type specimens ===
- List of marginocephalian type specimens
- List of ornithopod type specimens
- List of sauropodomorph type specimens
- List of non-avian theropod type specimens
- List of thyreophoran type specimens
- List of other ornithischian type specimens
- List of all dinosaurs

== In popular culture ==
- List of nicknamed dinosaur specimens
