= List of dinosaur specimens with documented taphonomic histories =

This list of dinosaur specimens with documented taphonomic histories enumerates those fossil dinosaur specimens that have been subjected to focused efforts aimed at reconstructing the events following the animal's death and the processes by which its remains were preserved in the fossil record.

== Ankylosaurs ==
=== Ankylosaurids ===
| Taxon | Nickname | Catalogue number | Institution | Age | Unit | Country | Description and Taphonomic History | Images |
|---|---|---|---|---|---|---|---|---|
| Ankylosauridae indet. | Not given | MPC-D 100/1359 | Mongolian Palaeontological Center | Late Campanian | Barun Goyot Formation | Mongolia | Individual preserved in a resting posture with both forelimbs and hindlimbs folded and tucked underneath the torso. Feeding traces of invertebrates are also preserved on some elements. | |

=== Nodosaurids ===
| Taxon | Nickname | Catalogue number | Institution | Age | Unit | Country | Description and Taphonomic History | Images |
|---|---|---|---|---|---|---|---|---|
| Borealopelta markmitchelli | Not given | TMP 2011.033.0001 | Royal Tyrrell Museum of Palaeontology | Albian | McMurray Formation | Canada | Individual preserving armor in life position, keratin sheaths, skin impressions, and stomach contents. The carcass was likely washed out to sea after death and buried in the seafloor. | |
| Edmontonia rugosidens | Not given | AMNH 5665 | American Museum of Natural History | Middle Campanian | Dinosaur Park Formation | Canada | Exceptionally preserved articulated individual with skin impressions and armor in life position. The carcass was washed out to an aquatic setting, possibly a river channel, and buried. | |

== Ceratopsians ==
=== Psittacosaurids ===
| Taxon | Nickname | Catalogue number | Institution | Age | Unit | Country | Description and Taphonomic History | Images |
|---|---|---|---|---|---|---|---|---|
| Psittacosaurus lujiatunensis | Not given | WZSSM VF000011 | Weihai Ziguang Shi Yan School Museum | Lower Aptian | Yixian Formation | China | Association of a P. lujiatunensis and a Repenomamus robustus locked in combat that were buried alive. | |
| Psittacosaurus sp. | Not given | DNHM D2156 | Dalian Museum of Natural History | Lower Aptian | Yixian Formation | China | Assemblage of 34 juveniles and one adult that were buried alive, possibly as a result of a collapsed burrow. | |
| Psittacosaurus sp. | Not given | IVPP V14341 | Institute of Vertebrate Paleontology and Paleoanthropology | Lower Aptian | Yixian Formation | China | Assemblage of six juveniles that succumbed to a mudflow. | |
| Psittacosaurus sp. | Not given | SMF R 4970 | Senckenberg Museum | Lower Aptian | Yixian Formation | China | Exceptionally preserved individual with numerous soft tissue impressions and color pattern. After death, its right arm was possibly scavenged by a Tianyulong. | |

=== Protoceratopsids ===
| Taxon | Nickname | Catalogue number | Institution | Age | Unit | Country | Description and Taphonomic History | Images |
|---|---|---|---|---|---|---|---|---|
| Bagaceratops indet. | Not given | MPC-D 100/551B | Mongolian Palaeontological Center | Middle Campanian | Djadokhta Formation | Mongolia | Crouched individual that was scavenged after death by invertebrates. | |
| Protoceratops andrewsi | Fighting Dinosaurs | MPC-D 100/512 | Mongolian Palaeontological Center | Middle Campanian | Djadokhta Formation | Mongolia | Preserves Protoceratops andrewsi locked in combat with a Velociraptor mongoliensis. | |
| Protoceratops andrewsi | Fox site Protoceratops | Not given | Not given | Middle Campanian | Djadokhta Formation | Mongolia | Crouched individual that was extensively scavenged after death by invertebrates. | |
| Protoceratops andrewsi | Not given | MPC-D 100/526 | Mongolian Palaeontological Center | Middle Campanian | Djadokhta Formation | Mongolia | Group of four juveniles buried alive by a strong sand-bearing event. Scavenging traces are present among individuals. | |
| Protoceratops andrewsi | Not given | MPC-D 100/534 | Mongolian Palaeontological Center | Middle Campanian | Djadokhta Formation | Mongolia | Two sub-adults buried alive by a strong sand-bearing event. Scavenging traces are present among individuals. | |
| Protoceratops andrewsi | Standing Protoceratops | Not given | Not given | Middle Campanian | Djadokhta Formation | Mongolia | An individual preserved in an upright position, possibly product of burrowing behavior. | |

== Ornithopods ==
=== Hadrosaurs ===
| Taxon | Nickname | Catalogue number | Institution | Age | Unit | Country | Description and Taphonomic History | Images |
|---|---|---|---|---|---|---|---|---|
| Brachylophosaurus canadensis | Leonardo | JRF 115H | Judith River Foundation | Middle Campanian | Judith River Formation | United States | Exceptionally preserved individual that was rapidly covered with sediment after death. | |
| Edmontosaurus annectens | Trachodon mummy | AMNH 5060 | American Museum of Natural History | Late Maastrichtian | Lance Formation | United States | Well-preserved individual lying on its back with flexed limbs. After dehydration, the carcass likely was shortly buried by sediments transported by a river resulting in excellent preservation. | |
| Edmontosaurus annectens | Senckenberg mummy | SMF R 4036 | Senckenberg Museum | Late Maastrichtian | Lance Formation | United States | Individual preserved in a flexed posture. May have been quickly buried by sediments allowing exceptional preservation. | |
| Edmontosaurus sp. | Dakota mummy | NDGS 2000 | North Dakota Geological Survey | Late Maastrichtian | Hell Creek Formation | United States | Individual preserved with extreme detail. The carcass was pierced by scavenging predators, allowing the release of gases, fluids, and microbes, allowing the dissecation and durability of soft tissues that persisted through weeks to months prior to burial and fossilization. | |
| Hadrosauridae indet. | Lizzie | 2000 P-02 | University of Alaska Museum | Middle Turonian | Matanuska Formation | United States | Partial remains of a juvenile. After death, the carcass was washed out to sea and sank to the seafloor where it got buried. | |
| Saurolophus angustirostris | Not given | MPC-D 100/764 | Mongolian Palaeontological Center | Late Campanian | Nemegt Formation | Mongolia | Block of partially articulated juveniles. After an unknown case of death, the individuals decomposed during a wet summer season when they got buried by sediments transported by a river channel. | |

== Theropods ==
=== Dromaeosaurs ===
| Taxon | Nickname | Catalogue number | Institution | Age | Unit | Country | Description and Taphonomic History | Images |
|---|---|---|---|---|---|---|---|---|
| Velociraptor mongoliensis | Fighting Dinosaurs | MPC-D 100/25 | Mongolian Palaeontological Center | Middle Campanian | Djadokhta Formation | Mongolia | Preserves a Velociraptor mongoliensis locked in combat with a Protoceratops andrewsi. | |

=== Oviraptorosaurs ===
| Taxon | Nickname | Catalogue number | Institution | Age | Unit | Country | Description and Taphonomic History | Images |
|---|---|---|---|---|---|---|---|---|
| Citipati osmolskae | Big Auntie | MPC-D 100/1004 | Mongolian Palaeontological Center | Middle Campanian | Djadokhta Formation | Mongolia | Brooding individual preserved on top of a nest. | |
| Citipati osmolskae | Big Mama | MPC-D 100/979 | Mongolian Palaeontological Center | Middle Campanian | Djadokhta Formation | Mongolia | Brooding individual preserved on top of a nest. | |
| Khaan mckennai | Romeo and Juliet (alternatively Sid and Nancy) | MPC-D 100/1002 and 100/1127 | Mongolian Palaeontological Center | Middle Campanian | Djadokhta Formation | Mongolia | Two very complete individuals preserved in close association. The pair was likely interacting when they got buried by collapsed sand dunes. | |
| Nemegtomaia barsboldi | Not given | MPC-D 107/15 | Mongolian Palaeontological Center | Late Campanian | Barun Goyot Formation | Mongolia | Brooding individual preserved on top of a nest. | |
| Oksoko avarsan | Not given | MPC-D 102/110 | Mongolian Palaeontological Center | Late Campanian | Nemegt Formation | Mongolia | Assemblage of three individuals buried in life positions. | |
| Oviraptor philoceratops | Not given | AMNH 6517 | American Museum of Natural History | Middle Campanian | Djadokhta Formation | Mongolia | Brooding individual preserved on top of a nest. | |
| Tongtianlong limosus | Not given | DYM-2013-8 | Dongyang Museum | Late Maastrichtian | Nanxiong Formation | China | Individual preserved with raised head and splayed arms, possibly died while trapped in mud. | |
