= List of dinosaur specimens preserved with agonistic and feeding traces =

This list of dinosaur specimens preserved with agonistic behavior and/or feeding traces enumerates those dinosaur specimens which bear traces of aggressive behavior or evidence that the specimen was fed upon by another animal prior to fossilization. Traces preserved in bone that shows signs of healing confirm that the injury was obtained during life and can be a considered a pathology. Traces that show no sign of healing may have been inflicted either too shortly before death for healing to occur or afterwards, and therefore cannot technically be demonstrated to be pathologies.

== Theropods ==
=== Dromaeosaurids ===
Taxon	Nickname	Catalogue number	Institution	Age	Unit	Country	Description	Images
Saurornitholestes langstoni	Not given	TMP 1988.121.0039	Royal Tyrrell Museum of Palaeontology	Campanian	Dinosaur Park Formation	Canada	Partial skeleton of Saurornitholestes langstoni including a dentary with toothmarks left by a juvenile tyrannosaurid.	
Velociraptor mongoliensis	Fighting Dinosaurs	MPC-D 100/25	Mongolian Palaeontological Center	Campanian	Djadokhta Formation	Mongolia	Individual of Velociraptor mongoliensis locked in catastrophic combat with Protoceratops andrewsi.	

=== Ornithomimids ===
Taxon	Nickname	Catalogue number	Institution	Age	Unit	Country	Description	Images
Deinocheirus mirificus	Not given	MPC-D 100/18 (holotype)	Mongolian Palaeontological Center	Campanian	Nemegt Formation	Mongolia	Deceased individual of Deinocheirus mirificus that was fed upon by Tarbosaurus bataar.	

=== Tyrannosaurids ===
Taxon	Nickname	Catalogue number	Institution	Age	Unit	Country	Description	Images
Gorgosaurus libratus	Not given	TMP 2009.12.14	Royal Tyrrell Museum of Palaeontology	Campanian	Dinosaur Park Formation	Canada	Juvenile individual of Gorgosaurus libratus that preyed upon, dismembered, and consumed two yearling individuals of Citipes elegans.	
Tyrannosaurus rex?	Dueling Dinosaurs (Bloody Mary)	Not given	North Carolina Museum of Natural Sciences	Maastrichtian	Hell Creek Formation	United States	Individual of a juvenile tyrannosaurid (suggested to be Tyrannosaurus) locked in (apparent) combat with Triceratops.	

== Ceratopsians ==
=== Ceratopsids ===
Taxon	Nickname	Catalogue number	Institution	Age	Unit	Country	Description	Images
Triceratops horridus	Dueling Dinosaurs	Not given	North Carolina Museum of Natural Sciences	Maastrichtian	Hell Creek Formation	United States	Individual of Triceratops locked in (apparent) combat with a juvenile tyrannosaurid (suggested to be Tyrannosaurus).	

=== Protoceratopsids ===
Taxon	Nickname	Catalogue number	Institution	Age	Unit	Country	Description	Images
Protoceratops andrewsi	Fighting Dinosaurs	MPC-D 100/512	Mongolian Palaeontological Center	Campanian	Djadokhta Formation	Mongolia	Individual of Protoceratops andrewsi locked in catastrophic combat with Velociraptor mongoliensis.	

=== Psittacosaurids ===
Taxon	Nickname	Catalogue number	Institution	Age	Unit	Country	Description	Images
Psittacosaurus lujiatunensis	Not given	WZSSM VF000011	Weihai Ziguang Shi Yan School Museum	Aptian	Yixian Formation	China	Individual of Psittacosaurus lujiatunensis locked in catastrophic combat with Repenomamus robustus.	
Psittacosaurus sp.	Not given	SMF R 4970	Senckenberg Museum	Aptian	Yixian Formation	China	Exceptionally preserved individual of Psittacosaurus whose right arm was possibly scavenged by Tianyulong.	

== Ornithopods ==
=== Hadrosaurids ===
Taxon	Nickname	Catalogue number	Institution	Age	Unit	Country	Description	Images
Edmontosaurus sp.	Dakota mummy	NDGS 2000	North Dakota Geological Survey	Maastrichtian	Hell Creek Formation	United States	Individual preserved with extreme detail that bears numerous feeding traces left by scavenging vertebrates.	
Hadrosauridae indet.	Not given	TMP 2018.012.0123	Royal Tyrrell Museum of Palaeontology	Campanian	Dinosaur Park Formation	Canada	Pedal ungual preserving gnawing-like biting traces left by a dromaeosaurid or very young tyrannosaurid.	
Saurolophus angustirostris	Not given	MPC-D 100/764	Mongolian Palaeontological Center	Campanian	Nemegt Formation	Mongolia	Deceased individual of Saurolophus angustirostris that was fed upon by Tarbosaurus bataar.	
