= Fighting Dinosaurs =

Fossil specimen of two dinosaurs in combat

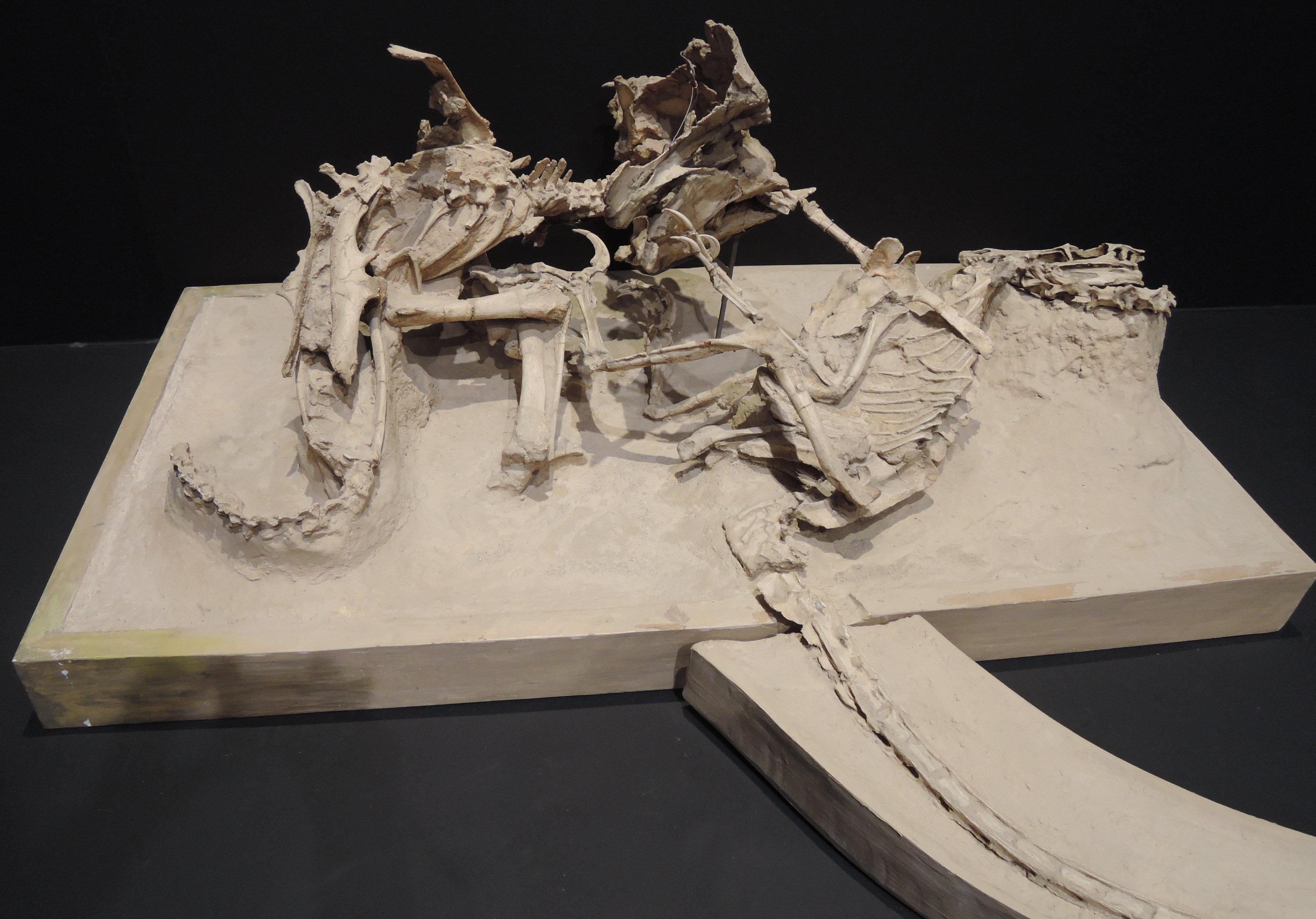
Fossil cast of the Fighting Dinosaurs at the Nagoya City Science Museum, Japan, 2014

The Fighting Dinosaurs is a fossil specimen found in the Late Cretaceous Djadokhta Formation of Mongolia in 1971. It preserves a Protoceratops andrewsi (a ceratopsian dinosaur) and Velociraptor mongoliensis (a dromaeosaurid dinosaur) locked in combat between 75 million and 71 million years ago and provides direct evidence of predatory or agonistic behaviour in non-avian dinosaurs. The specimen has caused much debate as to how both animals came to be preserved together with relative completeness. Several hypotheses have been proposed, including a drowning scenario, and burial by either dune collapse or sandstorm.

== History of the discovery ==
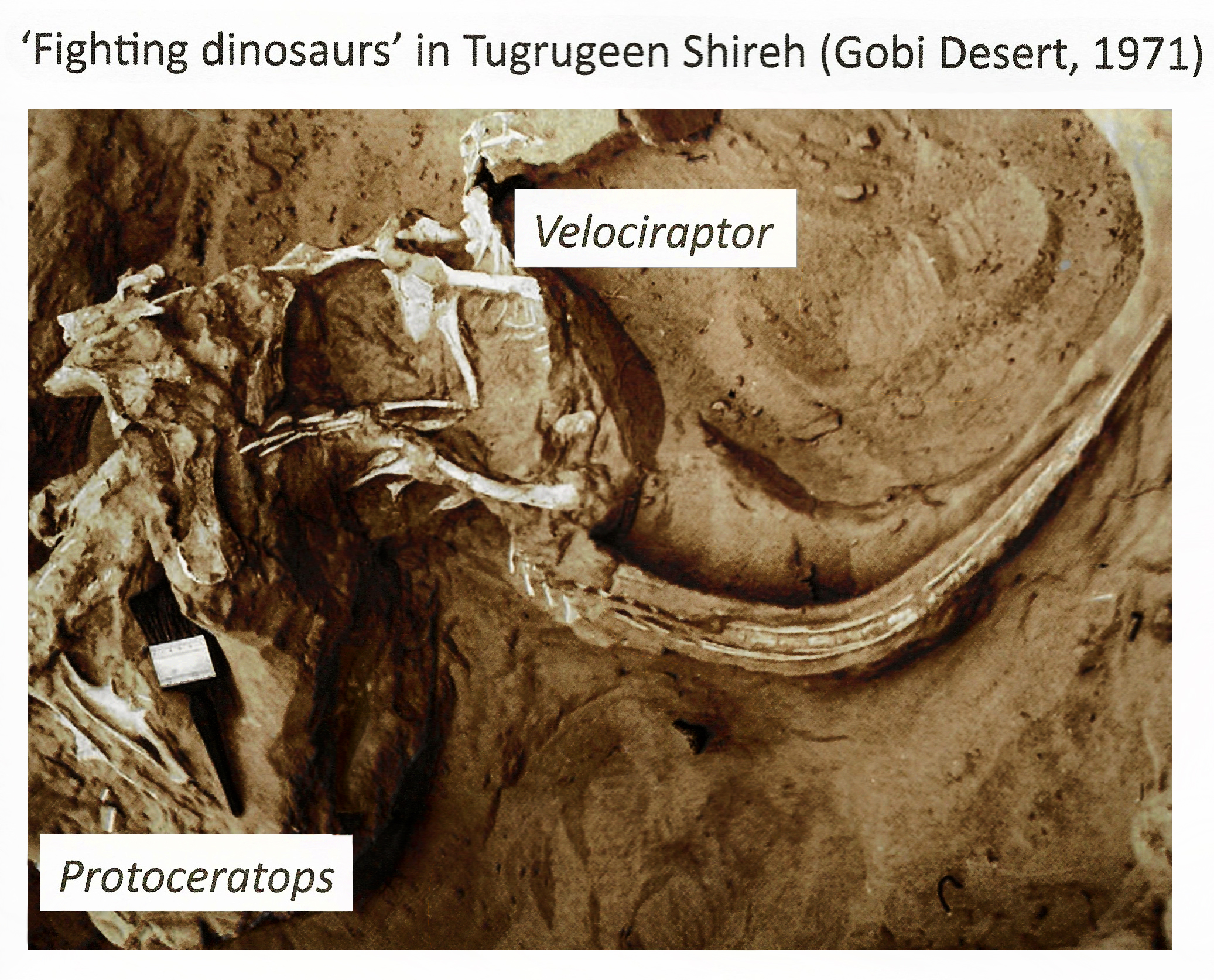
Fossil of the Fighting Dinosaurs as found in situ in 1971

From 1963 to 1971, Polish-Mongolian paleontological expeditions were carried out in the Gobi Desert with the objective of fossil-finding. The expedition of 1971 visited several localities of the Djadokhta and Nemegt formations, discovering the lower beds of the latter. In that year, on August 3, during the fieldwork of a team composed of paleontologists Tomasz Jerzykiewicz, Maciej Kuczyński, Teresa Maryańska, Edward Miranowski, Altangerel Perle and Wojciech Skarżyński, several fossils of Protoceratops and Velociraptor were found at the Tugriken Shire locality of the Djadokhta Formation, including a block containing a pair of them. The individuals of this block were identified as a P. andrewsi struggling with a V. mongoliensis. Although the circumstances of their burial were unknown, their pose indicated that they died simultaneously in a death match.

The presence of the specimen on the field was noted thanks to the overlapping skull fragments of the Protoceratops on the sediments, which eventually led to the excavation. It was soon nicknamed the Fighting Dinosaurs. The P. andrewsi individual is cataloged under the specimen number MPC-D 100/512 and the V. mongoliensis as MPC-D 100/25 (stored within the Mongolian Paleontological Center; originally GIN or GI SPS). In 2000 the American Museum of Natural History organized the traveling exhibit Fighting Dinosaurs: New Discoveries from Mongolia which was mainly focused on important Mongolian fossils with particular emphasis on the Fighting Dinosaurs. The specimen is now regarded as a national treasure of Mongolia.

== Geological age ==
The Djadokhta Formation—the unit that produced the Fighting Dinosaurs—is an important sedimentary and fossiliferous geological formation that has been extensively studied. However, estimating the exact age of the formation and, by extent that of the fossil fauna has been problematic, given the lack of optimal stratigraphic sections and fossil plants in order to correlate (placing into equivalence) adjacent geological formations. Nevertheless, examinations on the strata of the formation made by Demberelyin Dashzeveg and team in 2005 separates it into two geological members: a lower (older) Bayn Dzak Member and an upper (younger) Turgrugyin Member, with similar depositional paleoenvironments. The Fighting Dinosaurs specimen hails from the Tugriken Shire locality, which belongs to the Turgrugyin Member. Magnetostratigraphic datings performed by the team from the Bayn Dzak and Tugriken Shire localities suggest that the formation was intricately deposited about 75 million to 71 million years ago during the Campanian stage of the Late Cretaceous period, hence placing the fossil fauna and the Fighting Dinosaurs within this geological age.

== Interpretation ==
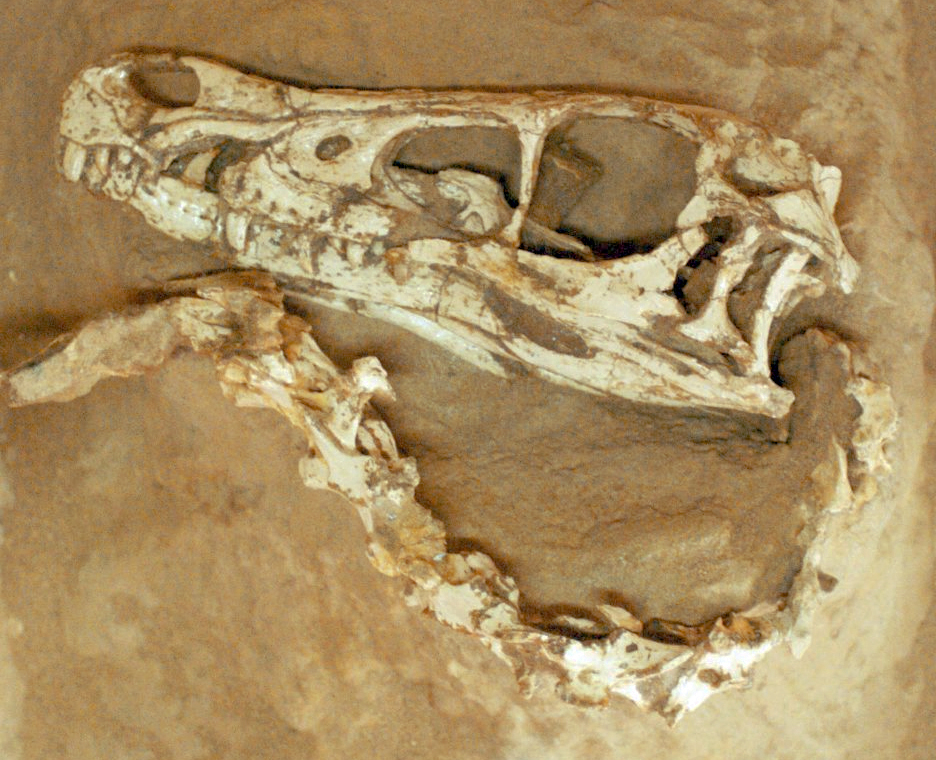
Skull of MPC-D 100/25 (Velociraptor mongoliensis)

In 1974, Mongolian paleontologist Rinchen Barsbold suggested that the quicksand-like bottom of a lake could have kept them together or that both animals fell into a swamp-like waterbody, making the last moments of their fight underwater. In 1993, Polish paleontologist Halszka Osmólska proposed that during the death struggle a large dune may have collapsed, simultaneously burying both Protoceratops and Velociraptor. Alternatively, the Velociraptor may have been scavenging an already dead Protoceratops and then got buried and eventually killed by an unknown event.

In 1995, David M. Unwin and colleagues argued that scavenging was unlikely, as there were numerous indications of a simultaneous death. The Protoceratops has a semi-erect stance and its skull is horizontally oriented, which would not been possible if the animal was already dead. The Velociraptor has its right hand trapped within the jaws of the Protoceratops and the left one scratching the Protoceratops skull. As it lies on the floor with its feet directed to the prey's abdomen and throat areas, it is unlikely that the Velociraptor was scavenging. Unwin and colleagues also examined the sediments surrounding the specimen and concluded that the pair was buried alive by a sandstorm or sand-bearing event. They interpreted the final interaction with the Protoceratops being grasped and dispatched with kicks delivered by the low-lying Velociraptor. Finally, they suggested that populations of Velociraptor could have been aware of crouching behaviors in Protoceratops during high-energy sandstorms and used them for successful hunts.

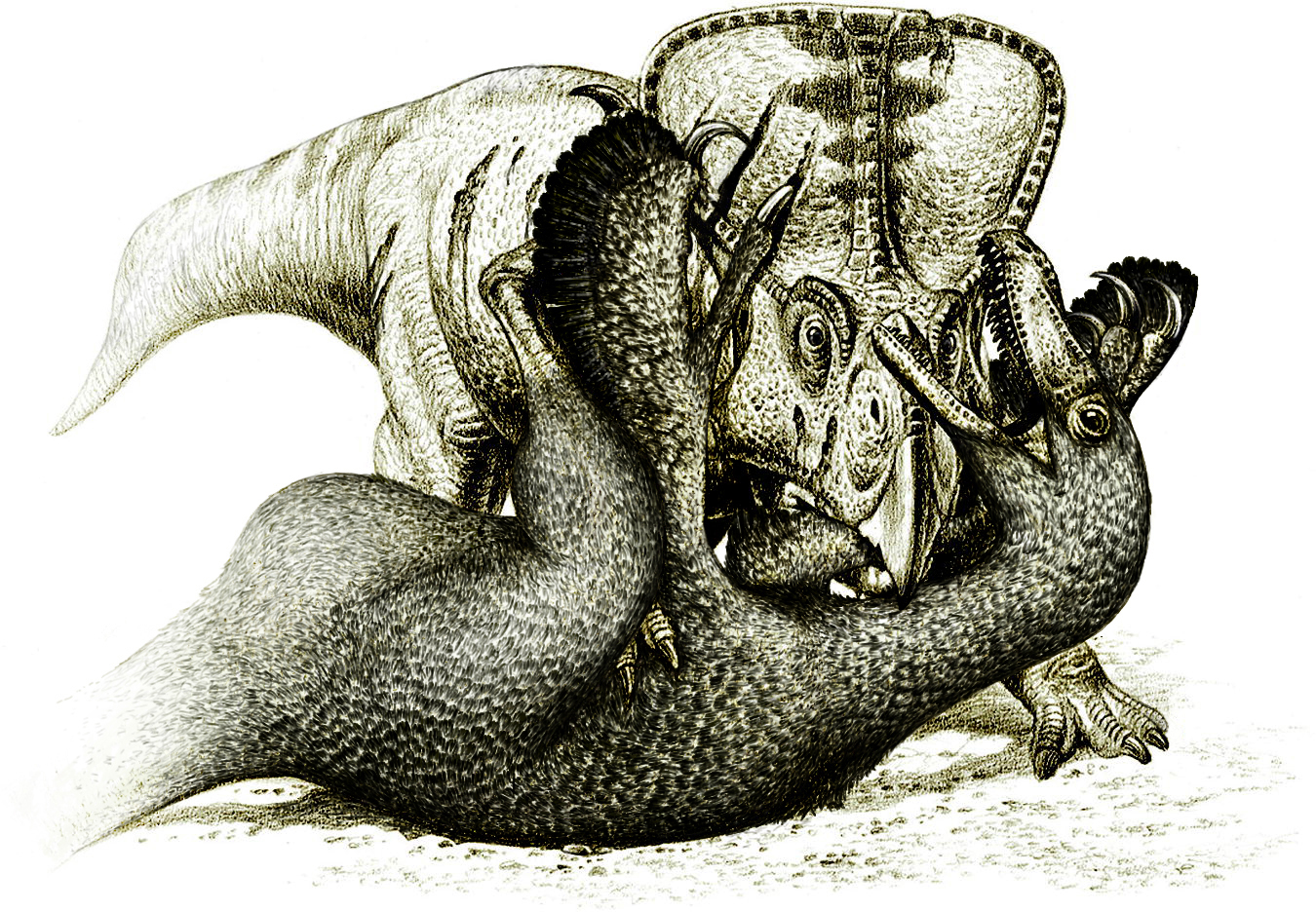
Life restoration depicting the fight

In 1998, Kenneth Carpenter suggested another scenario in which the multiple wounds delivered by the Velociraptor on the Protoceratops throat had the latter animal bleeding to death. Note, he said that the sickle claw was a piercing weapon, while rejecting the "slashing" or "disembowelling" explanation because the cutting edge was less sharp than a dull knife. He was vindicated by later biomechanical studies of the sickle claw. As a last effort, the Protoceratops bit the right hand of the predator and trapped it under its own weight, causing the death and eventual desiccation of the Velociraptor. The missing limbs of the Protoceratops were later torn off by scavengers. Finally, both animals were buried by sandy sediments. Given that the Velociraptor is relatively complete, Carpenter suggested that it may have been completely or partially buried by sand. He concluded that the Fighting Dinosaurs is among the specimens that provide direct evidence for non-avian theropods as active predators and not strict scavengers.

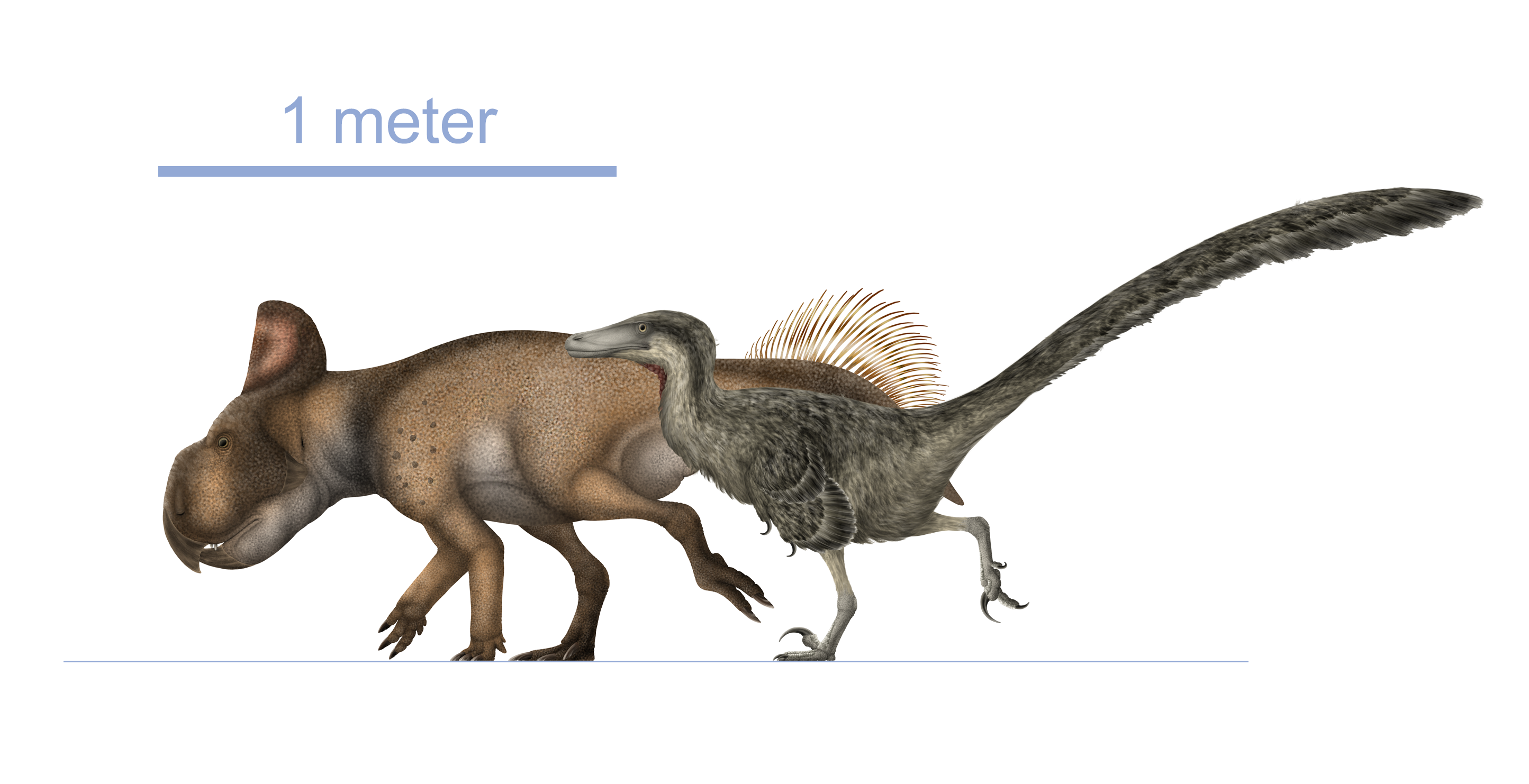
Size of the Fighting Dinosaurs

In 2016, Barsbold reported several anomalies within the Protoceratops individual: both coracoids have small bone fragments indicative of a breaking of the pectoral girdle, and the right forelimb and scapulocoracoid are torn off to the left and backwards, relative to its torso. He concluded that the prominent displacement of pectoral elements and the right forelimb was caused by an external force that tried to tear them out. Barsbold suggested that scavengers were the most likely authors of these anomalies since the Protoceratops is missing other body elements, and this event likely occurred after the death of both animals or during a point where movement was not possible. Because Protoceratops is considered to have lived in herds, another hypothesis is that members of a herd tried to pull out the already buried Protoceratops, causing the dislocation of its limbs. However, Barsbold pointed out that there are no related traces to support this latter interpretation. Lastly, he restored the course of the fight with the Protoceratops powerslamming the Velociraptor, which used its raptorial sickle claws to damage the throat and belly regions and its hand claws to grasp the herbivore's head. Before their burial, the fight ended up on the ground with the Velociraptor lying on its back under the Protoceratops. After the burial event, either a Protoceratops herd or scavengers tore off the buried Protoceratops to the left and backwards, slightly separating the Protoceratops and the Velociraptor.

== See also ==
- Timeline of ceratopsian research
- Timeline of dromaeosaurid research
- Paleobiota of the Djadochta Formation
- Dueling Dinosaurs, featuring Nanotyrannus and Triceratops likely locked in combat
- Specimen WZSSM VF000011, featuring Psittacosaurus and Repenomamus locked in combat
