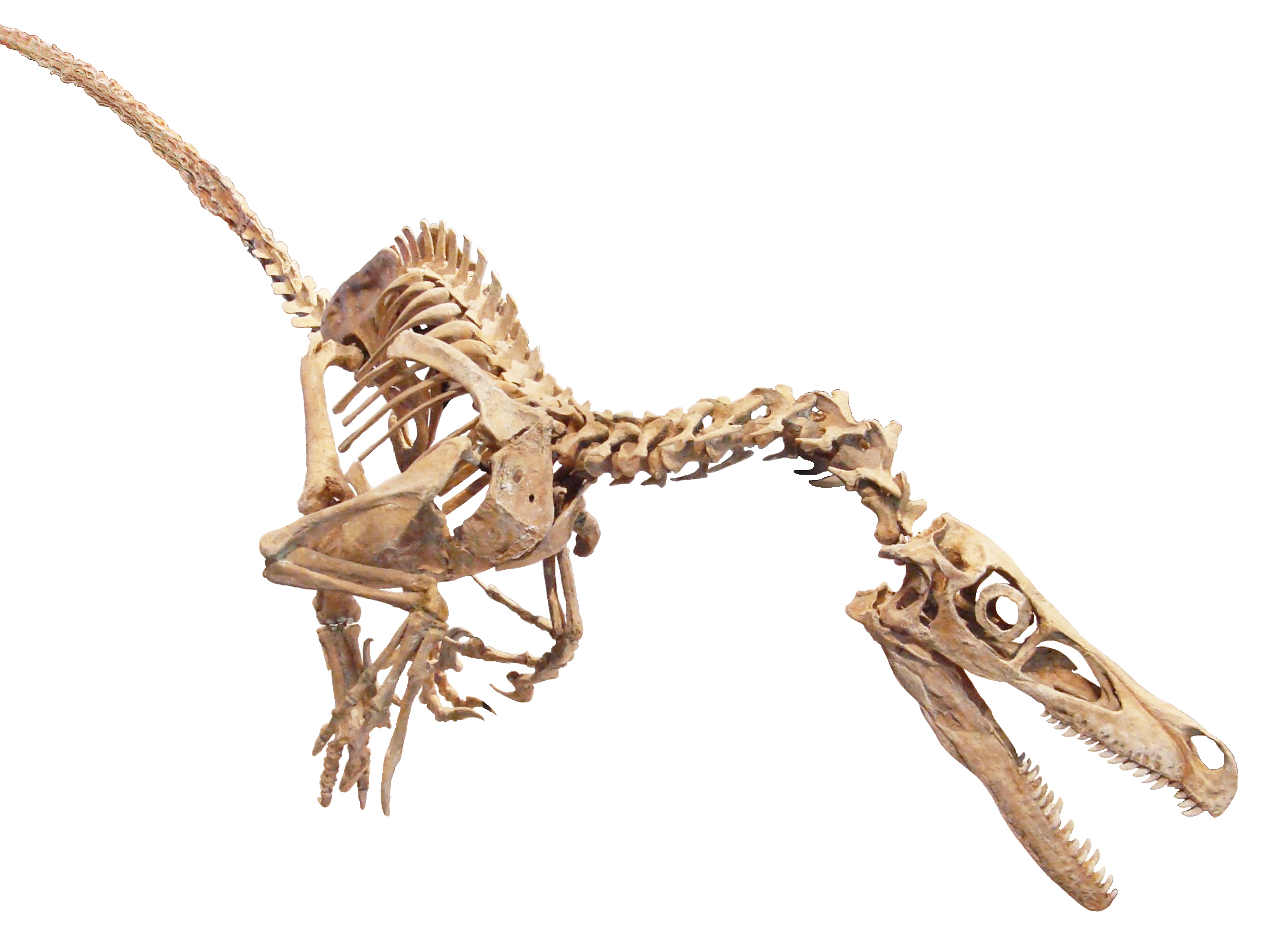
- Mounted V. mongoliensis cast at Royal Belgian Institute of Natural Sciences

Scientific classification
- Kingdom: Animalia
- Phylum: Chordata
- Class: Reptilia
- Clade: Dinosauria
- Clade: Saurischia
- Clade: Theropoda
- Family: †Dromaeosauridae
- Clade: †Eudromaeosauria
- Subfamily: †Velociraptorinae
- Genus: †Velociraptor; Osborn, 1924

Type species
- †Velociraptor mongoliensis Osborn, 1924

Other species
- †V.? osmolskae Godefroit et al., 2008

= Velociraptor =

Velociraptor Temporal range: Late Cretaceous, ~75–71 Ma Possible later Maastrichtian record

Genus of Late Cretaceous dinosaur

Velociraptor (/vəˌlɒsɪˈræptər, vəˈlɒsɪræptər/; lit. 'swift thief') is a genus of small dromaeosaurid dinosaurs that lived in Asia during the Late Cretaceous epoch, about 75 million to 71 million years ago (Mya). Two species are currently recognized, although others have been assigned in the past. The type species is V. mongoliensis, named and described in 1924. Fossils of this species have been discovered in the Djadochta Formation, Mongolia. A second species, V. osmolskae, was named in 2008 for skull material from the Bayan Mandahu Formation, China. A possible record is known from the Nemegt Formation.

Smaller than other dromaeosaurids like Deinonychus and Achillobator, Velociraptor was about 1.5–2.07 m (4.9–6.8 ft) long with a body mass of around 14.1–19.7 kg (31–43 lb). It nevertheless shared many of the same anatomical features. It was a bipedal, feathered carnivore with a long tail and an enlarged sickle-shaped claw on each hindfoot, which is thought to have been used to tackle and restrain prey. Velociraptor can be distinguished from other dromaeosaurids by its long and low skull, with an upturned snout.

Velociraptor (commonly referred to as "raptor") is one of the dinosaur genera most familiar to the general public due to its prominent role in the Jurassic Park films. In reality, Velociraptor was roughly the size of a turkey, considerably smaller than the approximately 2 m (6.6 ft) long and 90 kg (200 lb) reptiles seen in the novels and films (which were based on members of the related genus Deinonychus). Today, Velociraptor is well known to paleontologists, with over a dozen described fossil skeletons. One particularly famous specimen preserves a Velociraptor locked in combat with a Protoceratops.

== History of discovery ==
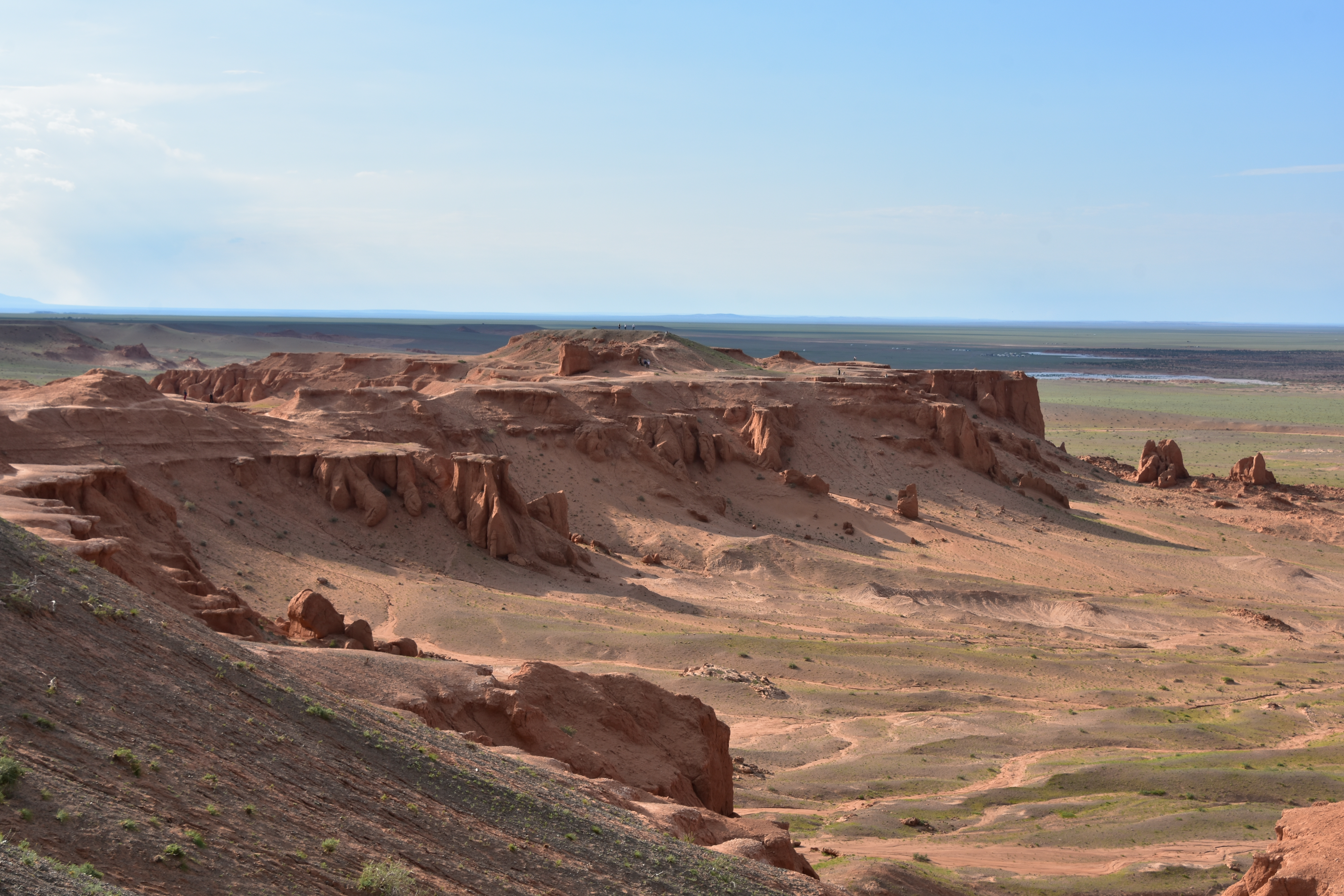
The Flaming Cliffs, Mongolia in 2018

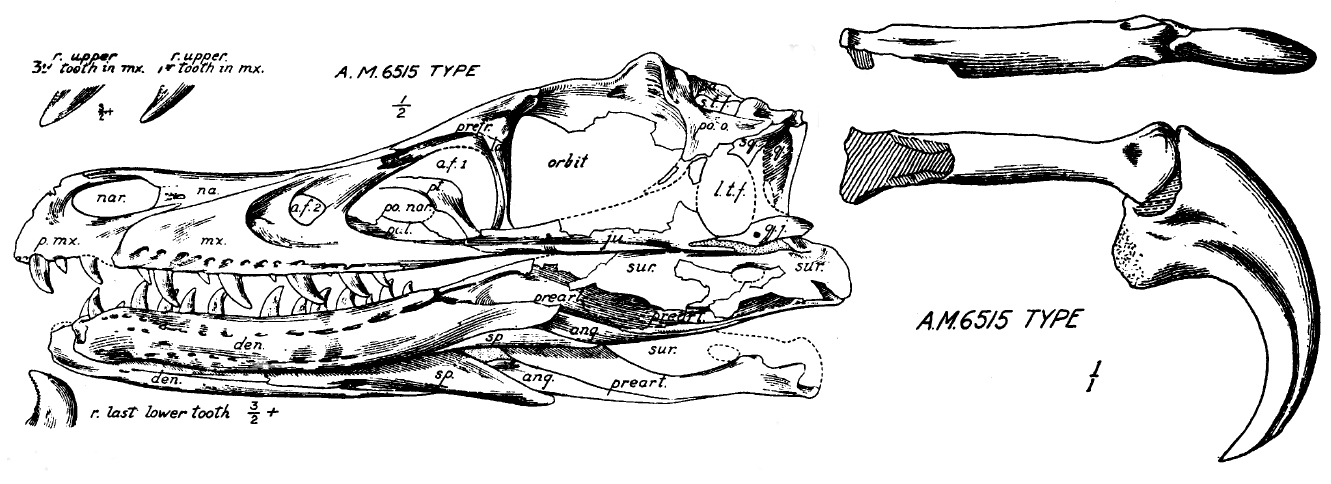
Line diagram of V. mongoliensis holotype skull and associated manual ungual

During an American Museum of Natural History expedition to the Flaming Cliffs (Bayn Dzak or Bayanzag) of the Djadochta Formation, Gobi Desert, on 11 August 1923, Peter Kaisen discovered the first Velociraptor fossil known to science—a crushed but complete skull, associated with one manual claw and adjoining phalanges (AMNH 6515). In 1924, museum president Henry Fairfield Osborn designated the skull and part of the manus as the type specimen of his new genus, Velociraptor. This name is derived from the Latin words velox ('swift') and raptor ('robber' or 'plunderer') and refers to the animal's cursorial nature and carnivorous diet. Osborn named the type species V. mongoliensis after its country of origin. Earlier that year, Osborn had informally mentioned the animal in a popular press article, under the name "Ovoraptor djadochtari" (not to be confused with the similarly named Oviraptor), eventually changed into V. mongoliensis during its formal description.

While North American teams were shut out of communist Mongolia during the Cold War, expeditions by Soviet and Polish scientists, in collaboration with Mongolian colleagues, recovered several more specimens of Velociraptor. The most famous is part of the "Fighting Dinosaurs" specimen (MPC-D 100/25; formerly IGM, GIN, or GI SPS), discovered by a Polish-Mongolian team in 1971. The fossil preserves a Velociraptor in battle against a Protoceratops. It is considered a national treasure of Mongolia, and in 2000 it was loaned to the American Museum of Natural History in New York City for a temporary exhibition.

Between 1988 and 1990, a joint Chinese-Canadian team discovered Velociraptor remains in northern China. American scientists returned to Mongolia in 1990, and a joint Mongolian-American expedition to the Gobi, led by the American Museum of Natural History and the Mongolian Academy of Sciences, turned up several well-preserved skeletons. One such specimen, MPC-D 100/980, was nicknamed "Ichabodcraniosaurus" by Norell's team because the fairly complete specimen was found without its skull (an allusion to the Washington Irving character Ichabod Crane). While Norell and Makovicky provisionally considered it a specimen of Velociraptor mongoliensis, it was named as a new species Shri devi in 2021.

In 1999, Rinchen Barsbold and Halszka Osmólska reported a juvenile Velociraptor specimen (GIN or IGM 100/2000), represented by a complete skeleton including the skull of a young individual. It was found at the Tugriken Shireh locality of the Djadochta Formation during the context of the Mongolian-Japanese Palaeontological Expeditions. The coauthors stated that detailed descriptions of this and other specimens would be published at a later date.

=== Additional species ===
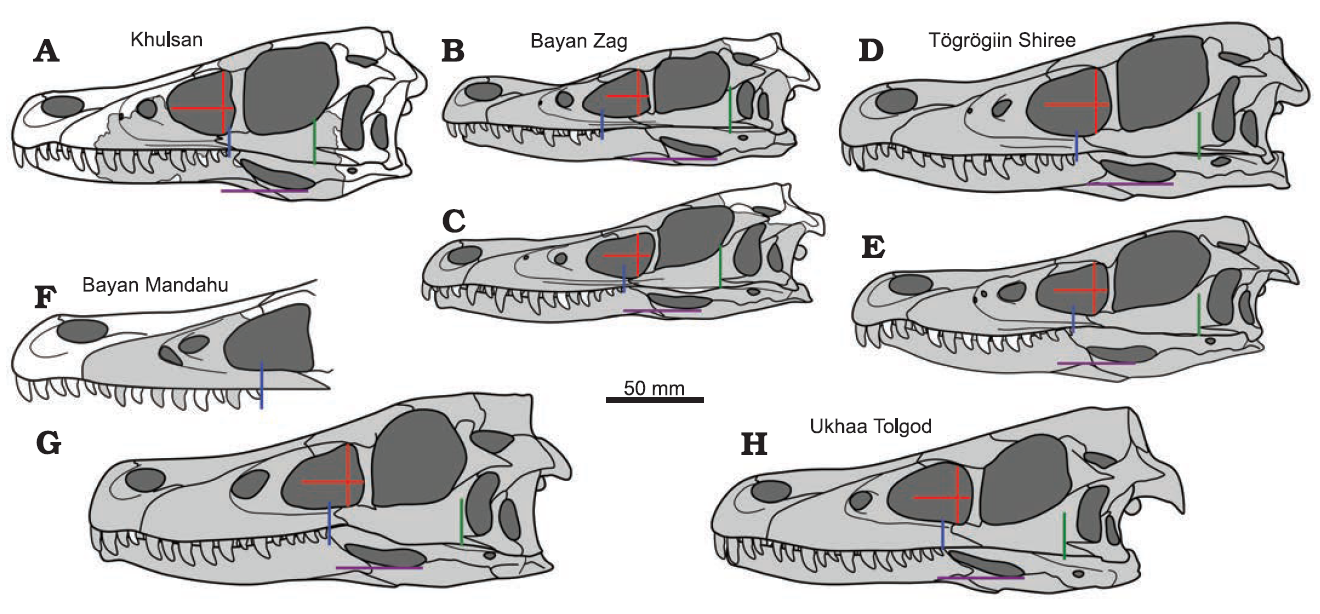
Velociraptorine skulls, B, D, E are V. mongoliensis, C is V sp., and F is V. osmolskae (known parts in gray)

Maxillae and a lacrimal (the main tooth-bearing bones of the upper jaw, and the bone that forms the anterior margin of the eye socket, respectively) recovered from the Bayan Mandahu Formation in 1999 by the Sino-Belgian Dinosaur Expeditions were found to pertain to Velociraptor, but not to the type species V. mongoliensis. Pascal Godefroit and colleagues named these bones V. osmolskae (for Polish paleontologist Halszka Osmólska) in 2008. However, the 2013 study noted that while "the elongate shape of the maxilla in V. osmolskae is similar to that of V. mongoliensis," phylogenetic analysis found it to be closer to Linheraptor, making the genus paraphyletic; thus, V. osmolskae might not actually belong to the genus Velociraptor and requires reassessment.

Paleontologists Mark A. Norell and Peter J. Makovicky in 1997 described new and well preserved specimens of V. mongoliensis, namely MPC-D 100/985 collected from the Tugrik Shireh locality in 1993, and MPC-D 100/986 collected in 1993 from the Chimney Buttes locality. The team briefly mentioned another specimen, MPC-D 100/982, which by the time of this publication remained undescribed. In 1999 Norell and Makovicky provided more insights into the anatomy of Velociraptor with additional specimens. Among these, MPC-D 100/982 was partially described and figured, and referred to V. mongoliensis mainly based on cranial similarities with the holotype skull, although they stated that differences were present between the pelvic region of this specimen and other Velociraptor specimens. This relatively well-preserved specimen including the skull was discovered and collected in 1995 at the Bayn Dzak locality (specifically at the "Volcano" sub-locality). Martin Kundrát in a 2004 abstract compared the neurocranium of MPC-D 100/982 to another Velociraptor specimen, MPC-D 100/976. He concluded that the overall morphology of the former was more derived (advanced) than the latter, suggesting that they could represent distinct taxa.

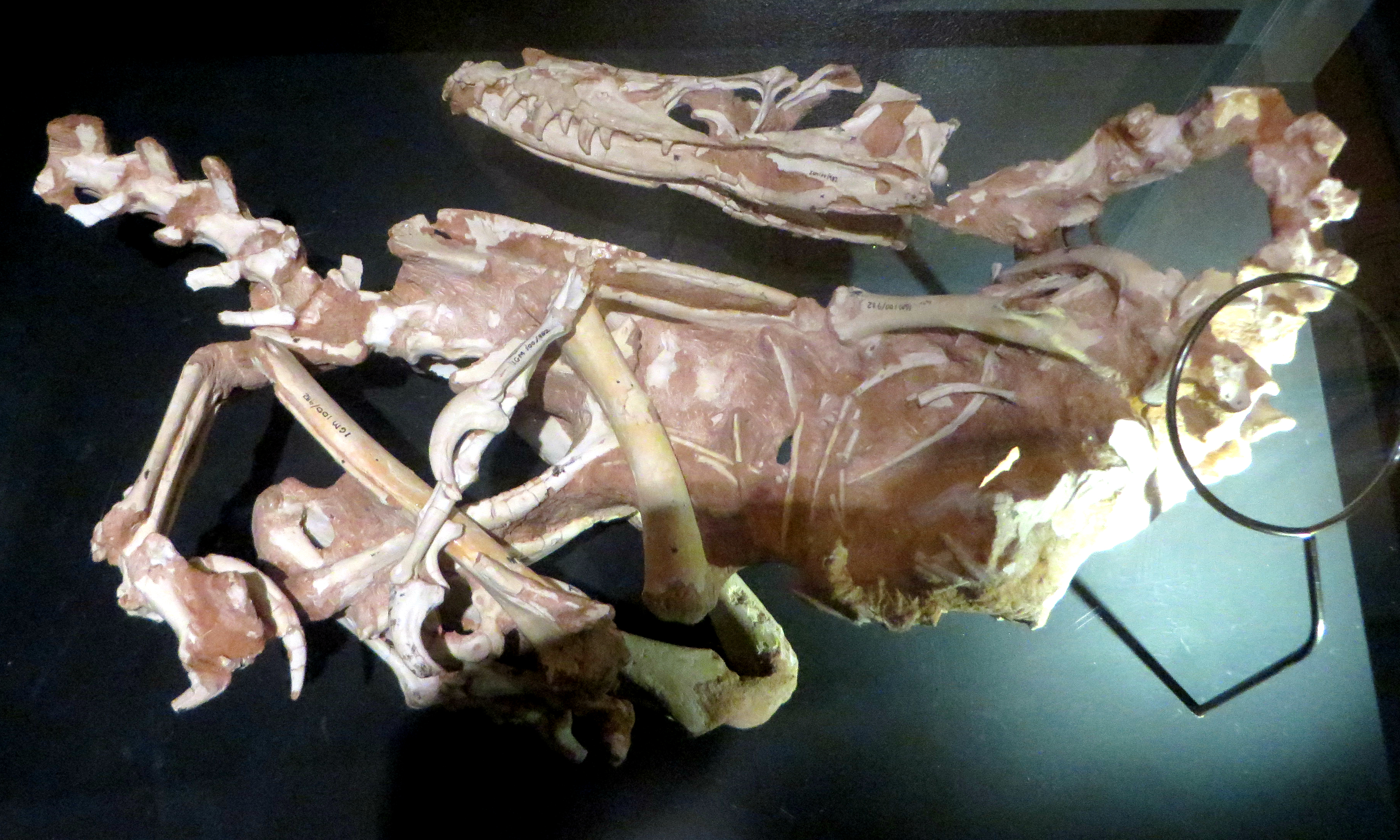
Velociraptor specimen MPC-D 100/982, possibly a new species

Mark J. Powers in his 2020 master thesis fully described MPC-D 100/982, which he concluded to represent a new and third species of Velociraptor. This species, which he considered distinct, was stated to mainly differ from other Velociraptor species in having a shallow maxilla morphology. Powers and colleagues also in 2020 used morphometric analyses to compare several dromaeosaurid maxillae, and found the maxilla of MPC-D 100/982 to strongly differ from specimens referred to Velociraptor. They indicated that this specimen, based on these results, represents a different species. In 2021 Powers with team used Principal Component Analysis to separate dromaeosaurid maxillae, most notably finding that MPC-D 100/982 falls outside the instraspecific variability of V. mongoliensis, arguing for a distinct species. They considered that both V. mongoliensis and this new species were ecologically separated based on their skull anatomy. The team in another 2021 abstract reinforced again the species-level separation, noting that additional differences can be found in the hindlimbs.

== Description ==
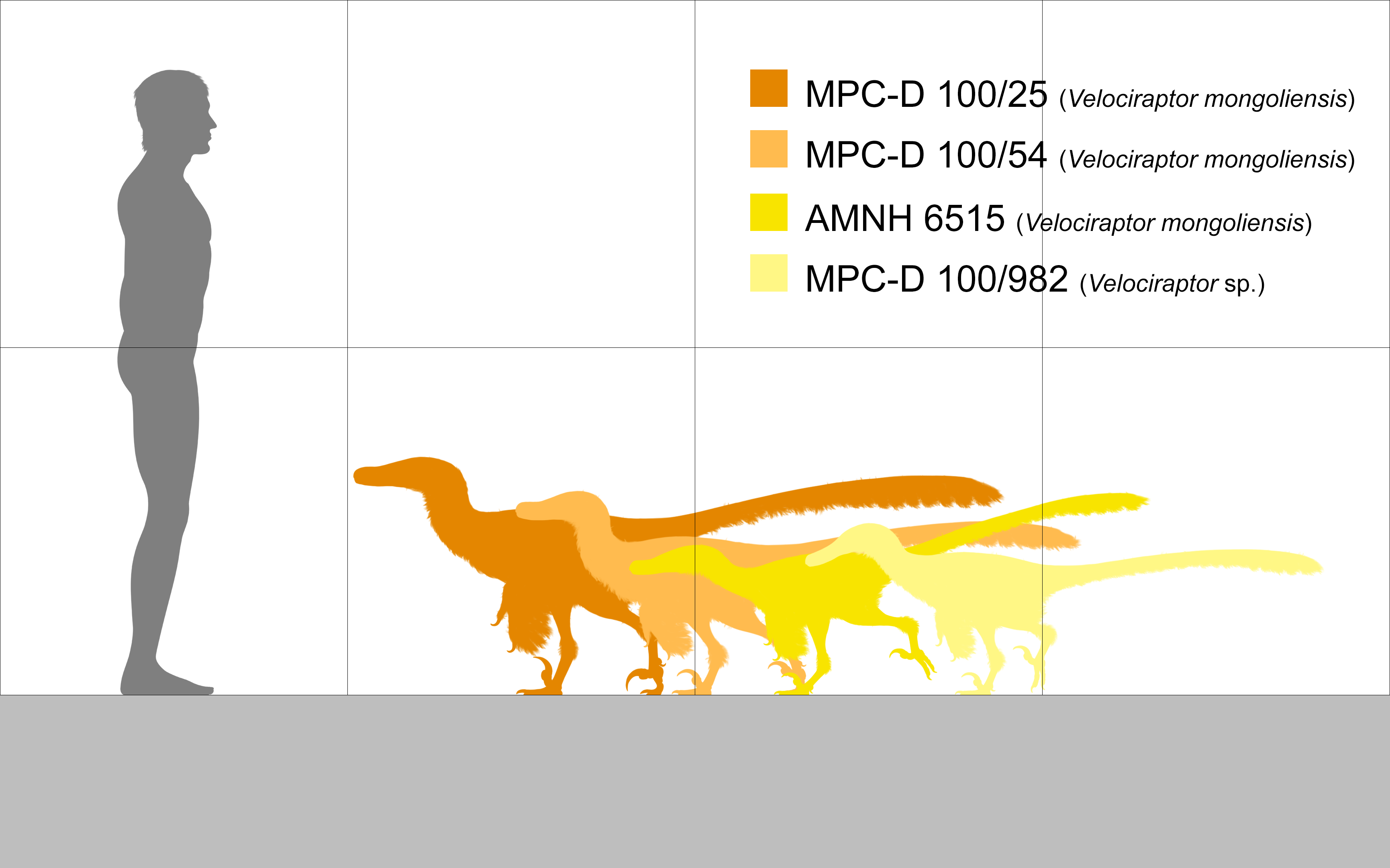
Velociraptor specimens compared in size to a 1.8 m (5 ft 11 in) tall human

Velociraptor was a small to medium-sized dromaeosaurid, with adults measuring between 1.5–2.07 m (4.9–6.8 ft) long, approximately 0.5 m (1.6 ft) high at the hips, and weighing about 14.1–19.7 kg (31–43 lb). Some estimates suggest that Velociraptor may have been larger, possibly reaching lengths of about 2.5 m (8 ft) and weighing up to 28 kg (60 lb).

Prominent quill knobs—attachment site of "wing" feathers and direct indicator of a feather covering—have been reported from the ulna of a single Velociraptor specimen (IGM 100/981), which represents an animal of estimated 1.5 m (4.9 ft) long and 15 kg (33 lb) in weight. The spacing of 6 preserved knobs suggests that 8 additional knobs may have been present, giving a total of 14 quill knobs that developed large secondaries ("wing" feathers stemming from the forearm). However, the specimen number has been corrected to IGM 100/3503 and its referral to Velociraptor may require reevaluation, pending further study. Nevertheless, there is strong phylogenetic evidence from other dromaeosaurid relatives that indicates the presence of feathers in Velociraptor, including dromaeosaurids such as Daurlong, Microraptor, or Zhenyuanlong.

=== Skull ===
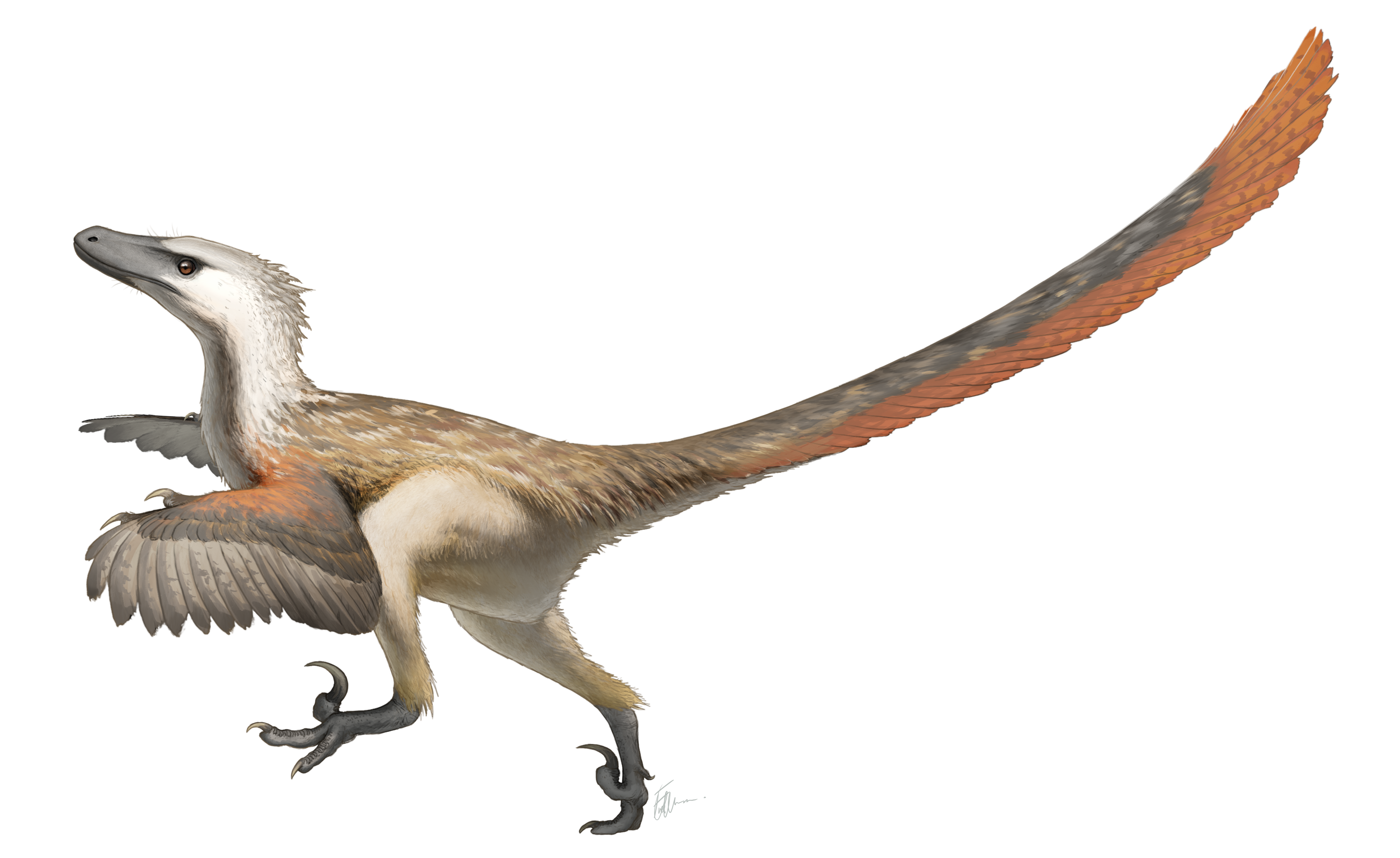
Life restoration

The skull of Velociraptor was rather elongated and grew up to 23 cm (9.1 in) long. It was uniquely up-curved at the snout region, concave on the upper surface, and convex on the lower surface. The snout, which occupied about 60% of the entire skull length, was notably narrow and mainly formed by the nasal, premaxilla, and maxilla bones. The premaxilla was the anteriormost bone in the skull, and it was longer than taller. While its posterior end joined the nasal, the main body of the premaxilla touched the maxilla. The maxilla was nearly triangular in shape and the largest element of the snout. On its center or main body, there was a depression developing a small oval to circular-shaped hole, called maxillary fenestra. Though in front of this fenestra were two small openings, referred to as promaxillary fenestrae. The posterior border of the maxilla formed (predominantly) the antorbital fenestra, one of the several large holes in the skull. Both premaxilla and maxilla had several alveoli (tooth sockets) on their bottom surfaces. Above the maxilla and making contact with the premaxilla, there was the nasal bone. It was a thin/narrow and elongated bone contributing to the top surface of the snout. Together, both premaxilla and nasal bones gave form to the naris or narial fenestra (nostril opening), which was relatively large and circular. The posterior end of the nasal was joined by the frontal and lacrimal bones.

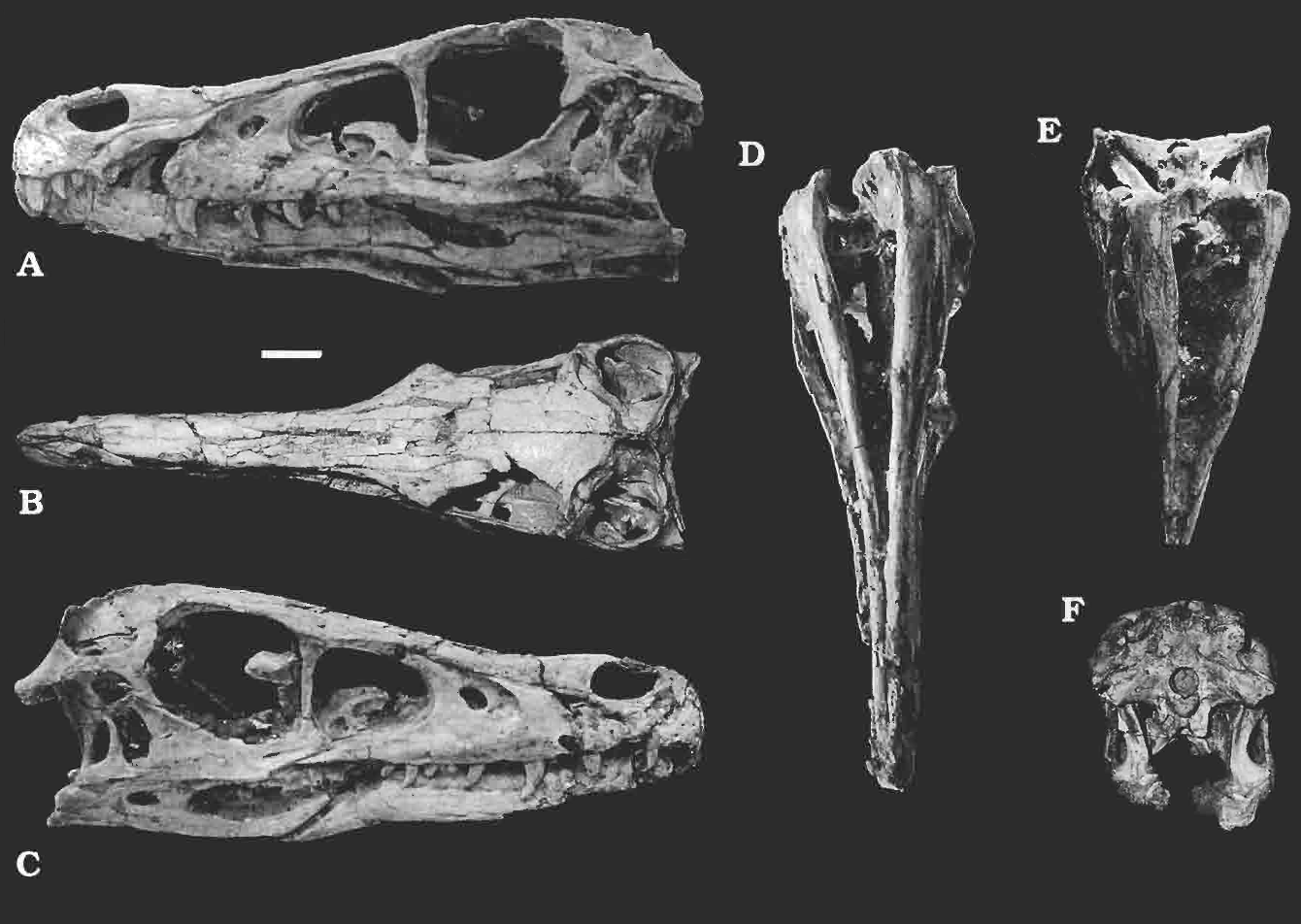
Skull of MPC-D 100/25 (Fighting Dinosaurs individual), in lateral (A-C), top (B), bottom (D-E), and posterior (E) views

The back or posterior region of the skull was built by the frontal, lacrimal, postorbital, jugal, parietal, quadrate, and quadratojugal bones. The frontal was large element, having a vaguely rectangular shape when seen from above. On its posterior end, this bone was in contact with the parietal, and such elements were the main bodies of the skull roof. The lacrimal was a T-shaped bone and its main body was thin and delicated. Its lower end meet the jugal (often called cheek bone), which was a large, sub-triangular-shaped element. Its lower border was notably straight/horizontal. The postorbital was located just above the jugal: a stocky and strongly T-shaped bone. As a whole, the orbit or orbital fenestra (eye socket)—formed by the lacrimal, jugal, frontal, and postorbital—was large and near circular in shape, being longer than taller. When seen from above, a pair of large and markedly rounded holes were present near the rear of the skull (the temporal fenestrae), whose main components were the postorbital and squamosal. Behind the jugal, an inverted T-shaped bone (also seen in other dromaeosaurids), known as the quadratojugal, was developed. While the upper end of the quadratojugal joined the squamosal, an irregularly-shaped element, its inner side meet the quadrate. The latter was of great importance for the articulation with the lower jaw. The posteriormost bone was the occipital bone and its projection the occipital condyle: a rounded and bulbous protuberance that meet the first vertebra of the neck.

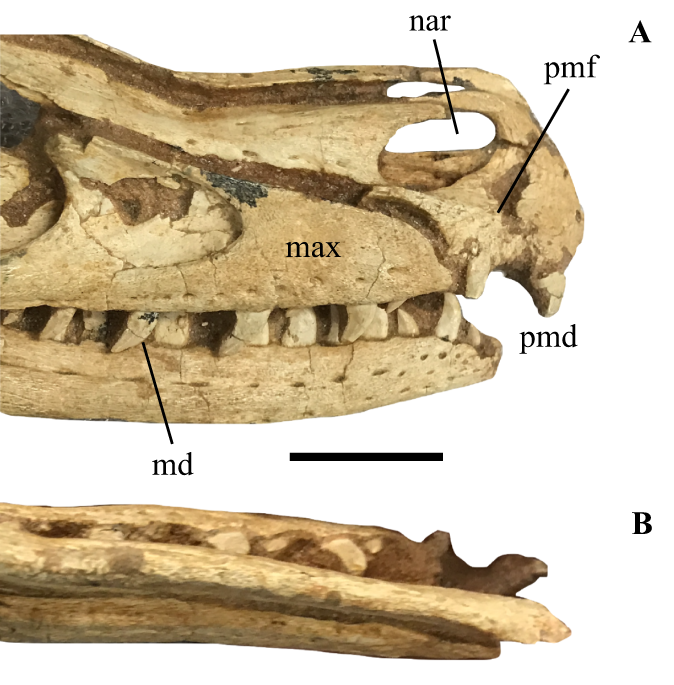
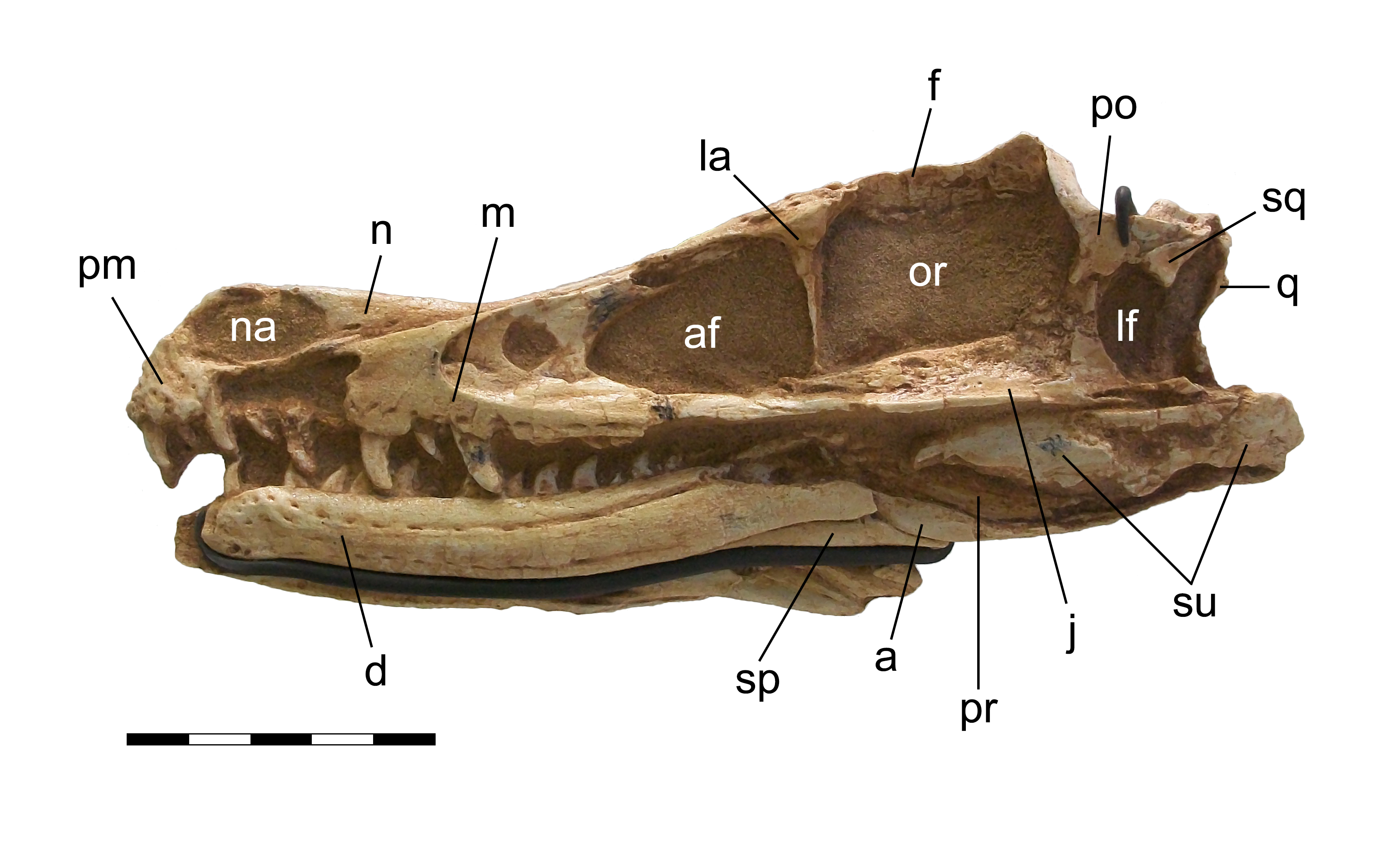
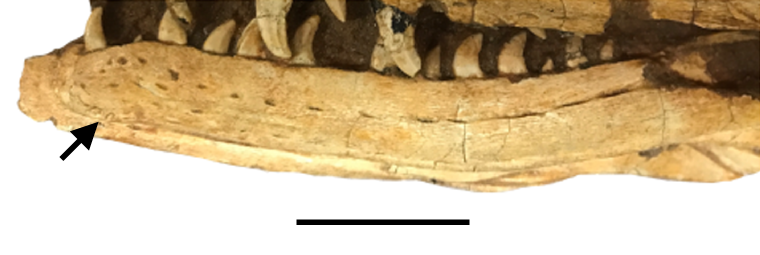
V. mongoliensis holotype skull (right), rostrum (left), and dentary (bottom)

The lower jaw of Velociraptor comprised mainly the dentary, splenial, angular, surangular, and articular bones. The dentary was a very long, weakly curved, and narrow element that developed several alveoli on its top surface. On its posterior end, it meet the surangular. It had a small hole near its posterior end, called surangular foramen or fenestra. Both bones were the largest elements of the lower jaw of Velociraptor, contributing to virtually its entire length. Below them were the smaller splenial and angular, closely articulated to each other. The articular, located on the inner side of the surangular, was a small element that joined the quadrate of the upper skull, enabling the articulation with the lower jaw. An elongated, near oval-shaped hole was developed in the center of the lower jaw (the mandibular fenestra), and it was produced by the joint of the dentary, surangular, and angular bones.

The teeth of Velociraptor were fairly homodont (equal in shape) and had several denticles (serrations), each more strongly serrated on the back edge than the front. The premaxilla had 4 alveoli (meaning that 4 teeth were developed), and the maxilla had 11 alveoli. At the dentary, between 14–15 alveoli were present. All teeth present at the premaxilla were poorly curved, and the two first teeth were the longest, with the second having a characteristic large size. The maxillary teeth were more slender, recurved, and most notably, the lower end was strongly more serrated than the upper one.

=== Postcranial skeleton ===
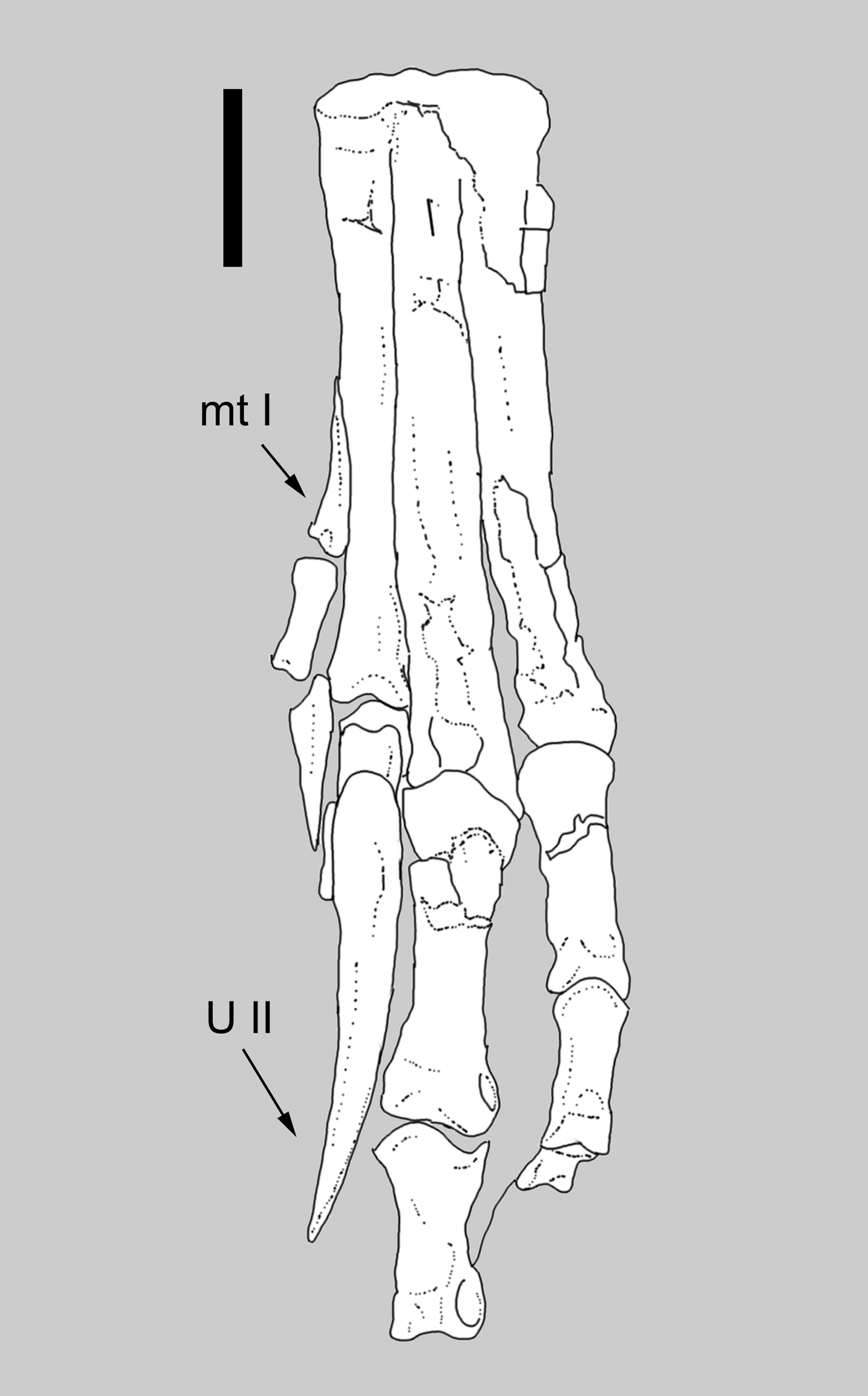
Line diagram of the pes (foot) of V. mongoliensis (MPC-D 100/985)

The arm of Velociraptor was formed by the humerus (upper arm bone), radius and ulna (forearm bones), and manus (hand). Velociraptor, like other dromaeosaurids, had a large manus with three elongated digits (fingers), which ended up in strongly curved unguals (claw bones) that were similar in construction and flexibility to the wing bones of modern birds. The second digit was the longest of the three digits present, while the first was shortest. The structure of the carpal (wrist) bones prevented pronation of the wrist and forced the manus to be held with the palmar surface facing inward (medially), not downward. The pes (foot) anatomy of Velociraptor consisted of the metatarsus—a large element composed of three metatarsals of which the first one was extremely reduced in size—and four digits that developed large unguals. The first digit, as in other theropods, was a small dewclaw. The second digit, for which Velociraptor is most famous, was highly modified and held retracted off the ground, which caused Velociraptor and other dromaeosaurids to walk on only their third and fourth digits. It bore a relatively large, sickle-shaped claw, typical of dromaeosaurid and troodontid dinosaurs. This enlarged claw, which could grow to over 6.5 cm (2.6 in) long around its outer edge, was most likely a predatory device used to restrain struggling prey.

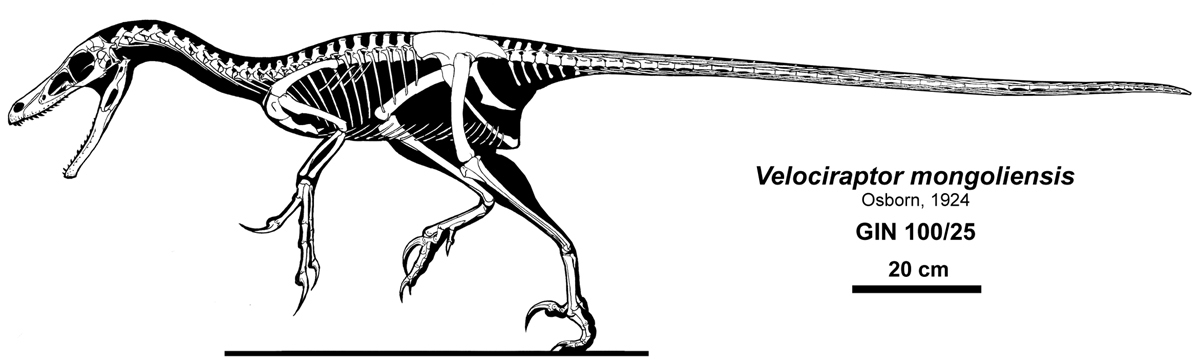
Skeletal reconstruction of V. mongoliensis (MPC-D 100/25)

As in other dromaeosaurs, Velociraptor tails had prezygapophyses (long bony projections) on the upper surfaces of the vertebrae, as well as ossified tendons underneath. The prezygapophyses began on the tenth tail (caudal) vertebra and extended forward to brace four to ten additional vertebrae, depending on position in the tail. These were once thought to fully stiffen the tail, forcing the entire tail to act as a single rod-like unit. However, at least one specimen has preserved a series of intact tail vertebrae curved sideways into an S-shape, suggesting that there was considerably more horizontal flexibility than once thought.

== Classification ==
Velociraptor is a member of the group Eudromaeosauria, a derived sub-group of the larger family Dromaeosauridae. It is often placed within its own subfamily, Velociraptorinae. In phylogenetic taxonomy, Velociraptorinae is usually defined as "all dromaeosaurs more closely related to Velociraptor than to Dromaeosaurus." However, dromaeosaurid classification is highly variable. Originally, the subfamily Velociraptorinae was erected solely to contain Velociraptor. Other analyses have often included other genera, usually Deinonychus and Saurornitholestes, and more recently Tsaagan. Several studies published during the 2010s, including expanded versions of the analyses that found support for Velociraptorinae, have failed to resolve it as a distinct group, but rather have suggested it is a paraphyletic grade which gave rise to the Dromaeosaurinae.

When first described in 1924, Velociraptor was placed in the family Megalosauridae, as was the case with most carnivorous dinosaurs at the time (Megalosauridae, like Megalosaurus, functioned as a sort of 'wastebin' taxon, where many unrelated species were grouped together). As dinosaur discoveries multiplied, Velociraptor was later recognized as a dromaeosaurid. All dromaeosaurids have also been referred to the family Archaeopterygidae by at least one author (which would, in effect, make Velociraptor a flightless bird). In the past, other dromaeosaurid species, including Deinonychus antirrhopus and Saurornitholestes langstoni, have sometimes been classified in the genus Velociraptor. Since Velociraptor was the first to be named, these species were renamed Velociraptor antirrhopus and V. langstoni. As of 2008, the only currently recognized species of Velociraptor are V. mongoliensis and V. osmolskae. However, several studies have found "V." osmolskae to be distantly related to V. mongoliensis.

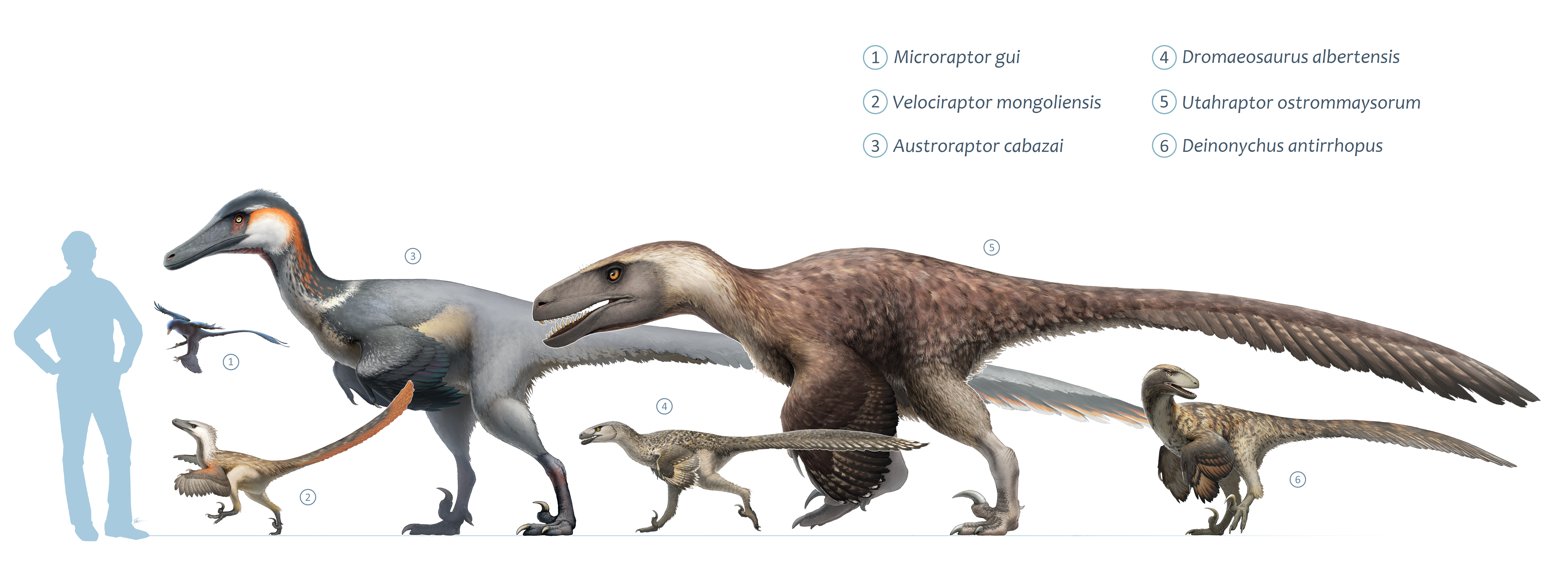
Size of Velociraptor (2) compared with other dromaeosaurs

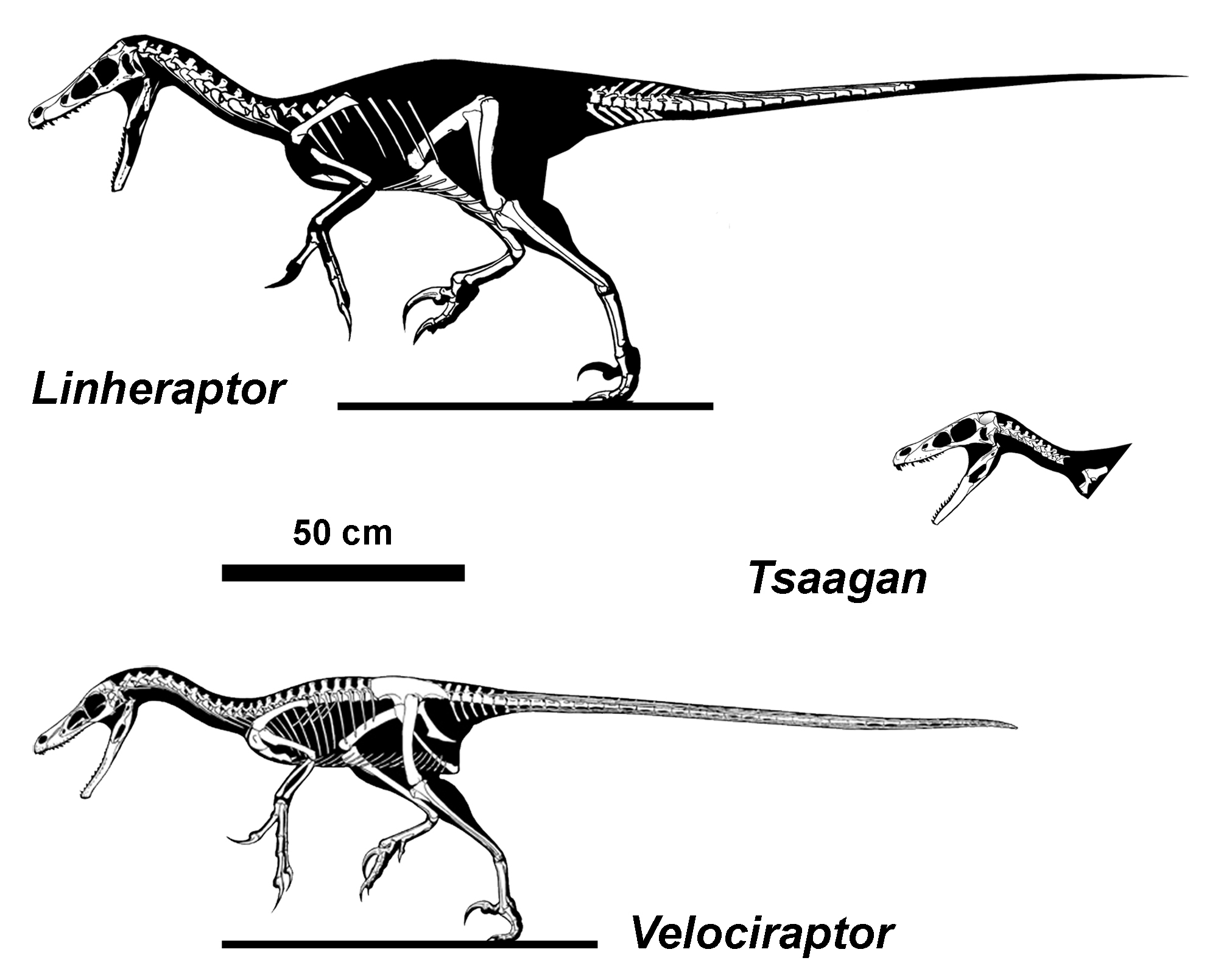
Comparison of some members of Velociraptorinae, featuring Linheraptor, Tsaagan and Velociraptor

Below are the results for the Eudromaeosauria phylogeny based on the phylogenetic analysis conducted by James G. Napoli and team in 2021 during the description of Kuru, showing the position of Velociraptor:

- Eudromaeosauria
  - Saurornitholestes
  - - Bambiraptor
    - - Dromaeosaurinae
        - Achillobator
        - Utahraptor
        - Dromaeosaurus
      - Velociraptorinae
        - - Linheraptor
          - Tsaagan
        - - Deinonychus
          - - - Adasaurus
              - Kuru
            - - Balaur
              - - Shri
                - Velociraptor

== Paleobiology ==
=== Feathers ===
In 2007 Alan H. Turner and colleagues reported the presence of six quill knobs in the ulna of a referred Velociraptor specimen (IGM 100/981) from the Ukhaa Tolgod locality of the Djadochta Formation. Turner and colleagues interpreted the presence of feathers on Velociraptor as evidence against the idea that the larger, flightless maniraptorans lost their feathers secondarily due to larger body size. Furthermore, they noted that quill knobs are almost never found in flightless bird species today, and that their presence in Velociraptor (presumed to have been flightless due to its relatively large size and short forelimbs) is evidence that the ancestors of dromaeosaurids could fly, making Velociraptor and other large members of this family secondarily flightless, though it is possible the large wing feathers inferred in the ancestors of Velociraptor had a purpose other than flight. The feathers of the flightless Velociraptor may have been used for display, for covering their nests while brooding, or for added speed and thrust when running up inclined slopes.

Because of the presence of another dromaeosaurid in Ukhaa Tolgod, Tsaagan, Napoli and team have noted that the referral of this specimen to Velociraptor is currently subject to reexamination.

=== Senses ===
Examinations of the endocranium of Velociraptor indicate that it was able to detect and hear a wide range of sound frequencies (2,368–3,965 Hz) and could track prey with ease as a result. The endocranium examinations also further cemented the theory that the dromaeosaur was an agile, swift predator. Fossil evidence suggesting Velociraptor scavenged also indicates that it was an opportunistic and actively predatory animal, feeding on carrion during times of drought or famine, if in poor health, or depending on the animal's age.

=== Feeding ===
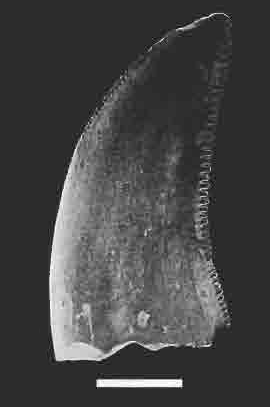
Isolated tooth of ZPAL MgD-I/97a

In 2020, Powers and colleagues re-examined the maxillae of several eudromaeosaur taxa concluding that most Asian and North American eudromaeosaurs were separated by snout morphology and ecological strategies. They found the maxilla to be a reliable reference when inferring the shape of the premaxilla and overall snout. For instance, most Asian species have elongated snouts based on the maxilla (namely velociraptorines), indicating a selective feeding in Velociraptor and relatives, such as picking up small, fast prey. In contrast, most North American eudromaeosaurs, mostly dromaeosaurines, feature a robust and deep maxillar morphology. However, the large dromaeosurine Achillobator is a unique exception to Asian taxa with its deep maxilla.

Manabu Sakamoto in 2022 performed a Bayesian phylogenetic predictive modelling framework for estimating jaw muscle parameters and bite forces of several extinct archosaurs, based on skull widths and phylogenetic relationships between groups. Among studied taxa, Velociraptor was scored with a bite force of 304 N, which was lower than that of other dromaeosaurids such as Dromaeosaurus (885 N) or Deinonychus (706 N).

=== Predatory behavior ===
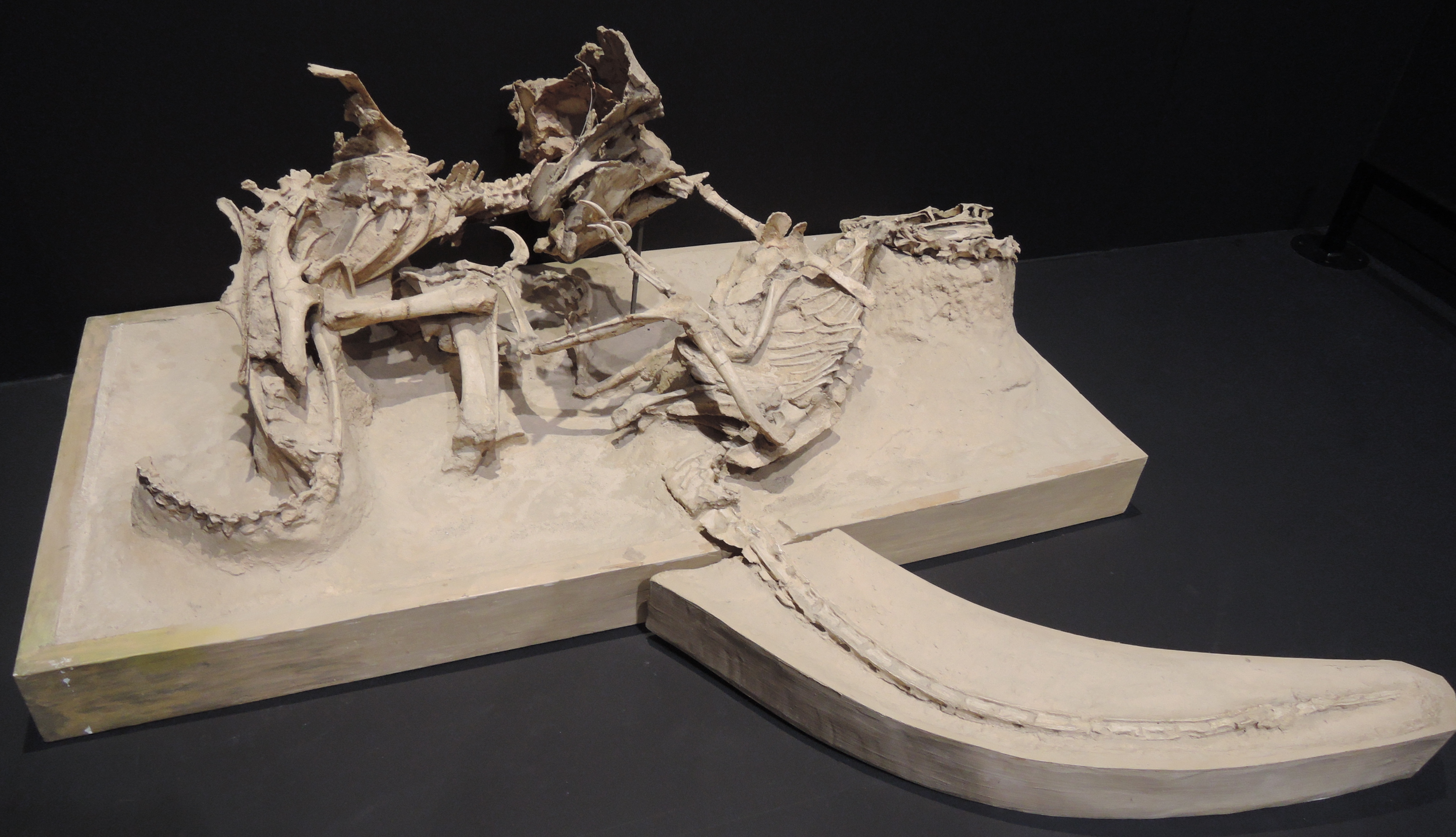
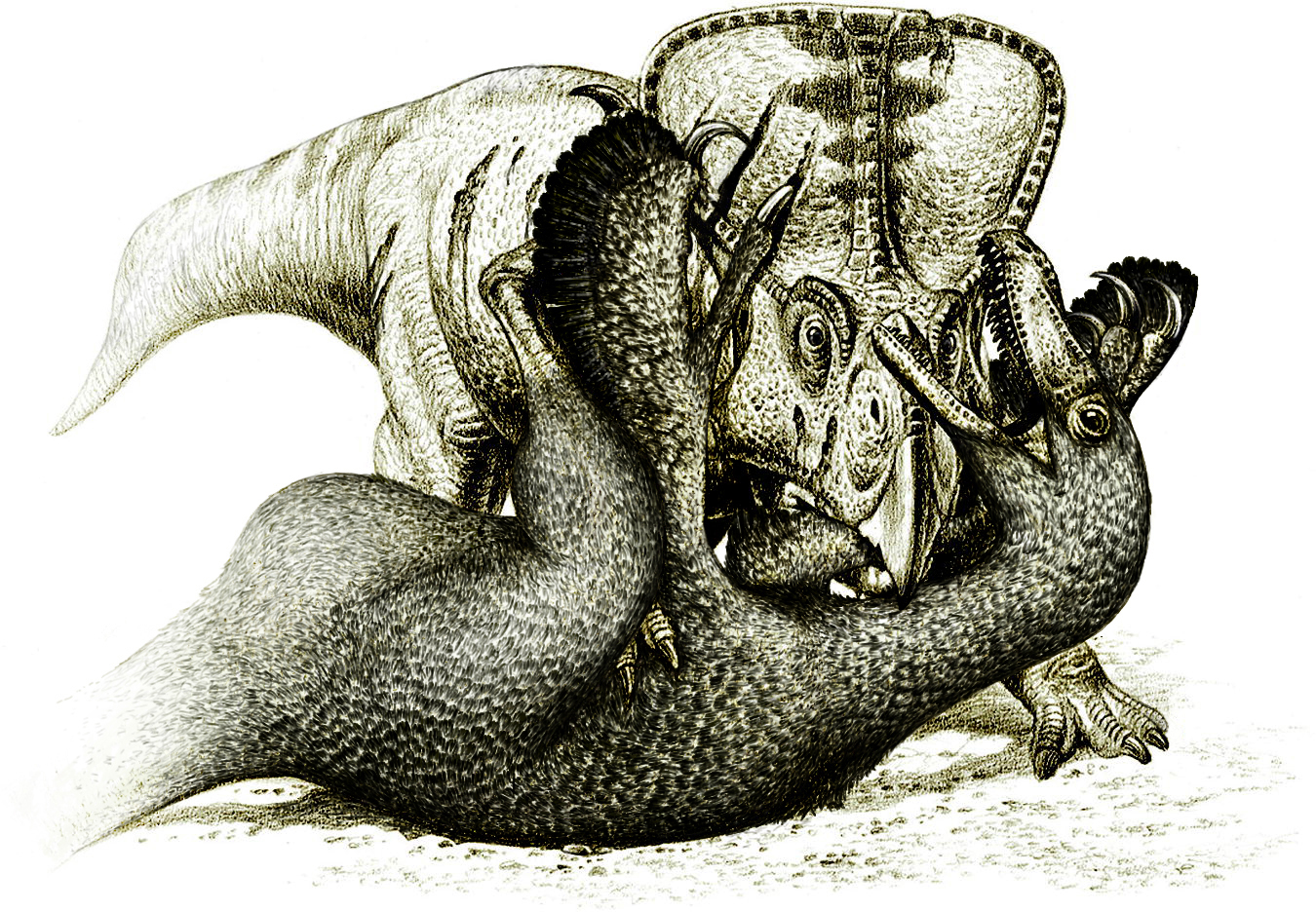
The "Fighting Dinosaurs" specimen of V. mongoliensis and Protoceratops andrewsi and restoration of same

The "Fighting Dinosaurs" specimen, found in 1971, preserves a Velociraptor mongoliensis and Protoceratops andrewsi in combat and provides direct evidence of predatory behavior. When originally reported, it was hypothesized that the two animals drowned. However, as the animals were preserved in ancient sand dune deposits, it is now thought that the animals were buried in sand, either from a collapsing dune or in a sandstorm. Burial must have been extremely rapid, judging from the lifelike poses in which the animals were preserved. Parts of the Protoceratops are missing, which has been seen as evidence of scavenging by other animals. Comparisons between the scleral rings of Velociraptor, Protoceratops, and modern birds and reptiles indicates that Velociraptor may have been nocturnal, while Protoceratops may have been cathemeral, active throughout the day during short intervals, suggesting that the fight may have occurred at twilight or during low-light conditions.

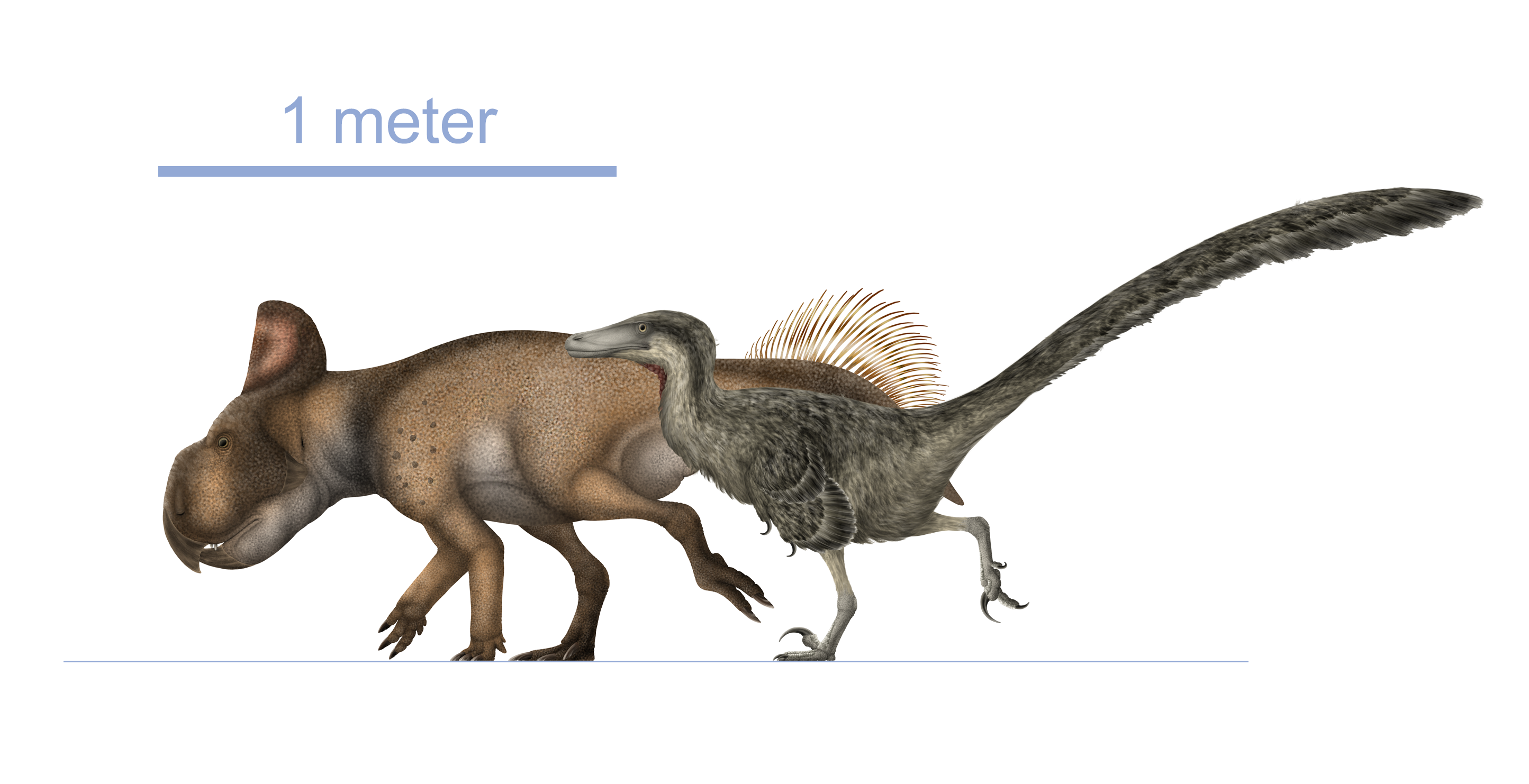
Size comparison of the Fighting Dinosaurs

The distinctive claw, on the second digit of dromaeosaurids, has traditionally been depicted as a slashing weapon; its assumed use being to cut and disembowel prey. In the "Fighting Dinosaurs" specimen, the Velociraptor lies underneath, with one of its sickle claws apparently embedded in the throat of its prey, while the beak of Protoceratops is clamped down upon the right forelimb of its attacker. This suggests Velociraptor may have used its sickle claw to pierce vital organs of the throat, such as the jugular vein, carotid artery, or trachea (windpipe), rather than slashing the abdomen. The inside edge of the claw was rounded and not unusually sharp, which may have precluded any sort of cutting or slashing action, although only the bony core of the claw is preserved. The thick abdominal wall of skin and muscle of large prey species would have been difficult to slash without a specialized cutting surface. The slashing hypothesis was tested during a 2005 BBC documentary, The Truth About Killer Dinosaurs. The producers of the program created an artificial Velociraptor leg with a sickle claw and used a pork belly to simulate the dinosaur's prey. Though the sickle claw did penetrate the abdominal wall, it was unable to tear it open, indicating that the claw was not used to disembowel prey.

Remains of Deinonychus, a closely related dromaeosaurid, have commonly been found in aggregations of several individuals. Deinonychus has also been found in association with the large ornithopod Tenontosaurus, which has been cited as evidence of cooperative (pack) hunting. However, the only solid evidence for social behavior of any kind among dromaeosaurids comes from a Chinese trackway which shows six individuals of a large species moving as a group. Although many isolated fossils of Velociraptor have been found in Mongolia, none were closely associated with other individuals. Therefore, while Velociraptor is commonly depicted as a pack hunter, as in Jurassic Park, there is only limited fossil evidence to support this theory for dromaeosaurids in general and none specific to Velociraptor itself. Dromeosaur footprints in China suggest that a few other raptor genera may have hunted in packs, but there have been no conclusive examples of pack behavior found.

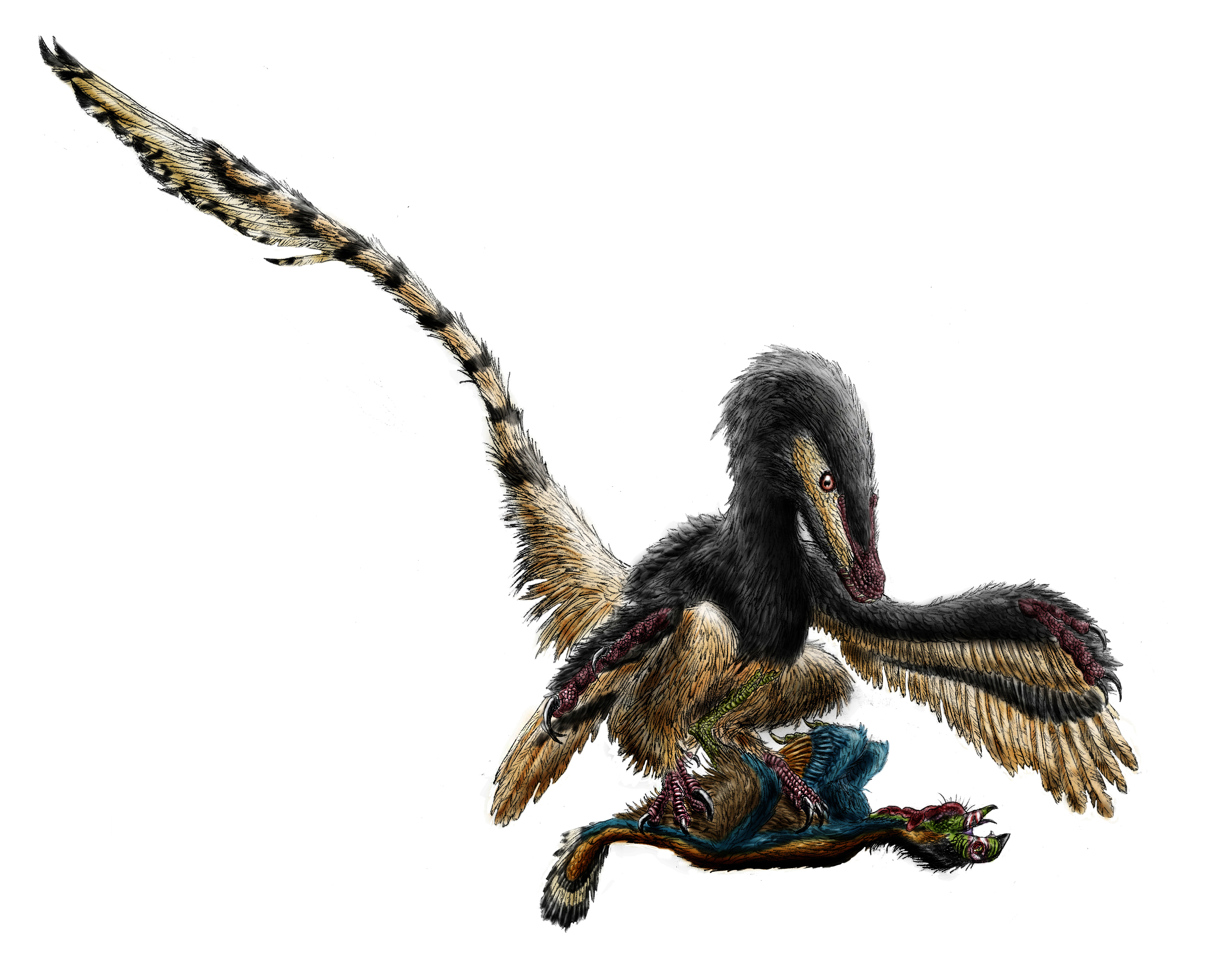
V. mongoliensis restraining an oviraptorosaur with its sickle claws

In 2011, Denver Fowler and colleagues suggested a new method by which dromaeosaurs like Velociraptor and similar dromaeosaurs may have captured and restrained prey. This model, known as the "raptor prey restraint" (RPR) model of predation, proposes that dromaeosaurs killed their prey in a manner very similar to extant accipitrid birds of prey: by leaping onto their quarry, pinning it under their body weight, and gripping it tightly with the large, sickle-shaped claws. These researchers proposed that, like accipitrids, the dromaeosaur would then begin to feed on the animal while it was still alive, and prey death would eventually result from blood loss and organ failure. This proposal is based primarily on comparisons between the morphology and proportions of the feet and legs of dromaeosaurs to several groups of extant birds of prey with known predatory behaviors. Fowler found that the feet and legs of dromaeosaurs most closely resemble those of eagles and hawks, especially in terms of having an enlarged second claw and a similar range of grasping motion. The short metatarsus and foot strength, however, would have been more similar to that of owls. The RPR method of predation would be consistent with other aspects of Velociraptor's anatomy, such as their unusual jaw and arm morphology. The arms, which could exert a lot of force but were likely covered in long feathers, may have been used as flapping stabilizers for balance while atop a struggling prey animal, along with the stiff counterbalancing tail. The jaws, thought by Fowler and colleagues to be comparatively weak, would have been useful for row saw motion bites like the modern day Komodo dragon, which also has a weak bite, to finish off its prey if the kicks were not powerful enough. These predatory adaptations working together may also have implications for the origin of flapping in paravians.

=== Scavenging behavior ===
In 2010, Hone and colleagues published a paper on their 2008 discovery of shed teeth of what they believed to be a Velociraptor near a tooth-marked jaw bone of what they believed to be a Protoceratops in the Bayan Mandahu Formation. The authors concluded that the find represented "late-stage carcass consumption by Velociraptor" as the predator would have eaten other parts of a freshly killed Protoceratops before biting in the jaw area. The evidence was seen as supporting the inference from the "Fighting Dinosaurs" fossil that Protoceratops was part of the diet of Velociraptor.

In 2012, Hone and colleagues published a paper that described a Velociraptor specimen with a long bone of an azhdarchid pterosaur in its gut. This was interpreted as showing scavenging behaviour.

In a 2024 study by Tse, Miller, and Pittman et al., focusing on the skull morphology and bite forces of various dromaeosaurids, it was discovered that Velociraptor had high bite force resistance compared to other dromaeosaurids such as Dromaeosaurus itself and Deinonychus, the latter of which was much larger. It is theorized by the authors that high bite force resistance was an adaptation towards obtaining food through scavenging more often than through active predation in Velociraptor.

=== Metabolism ===
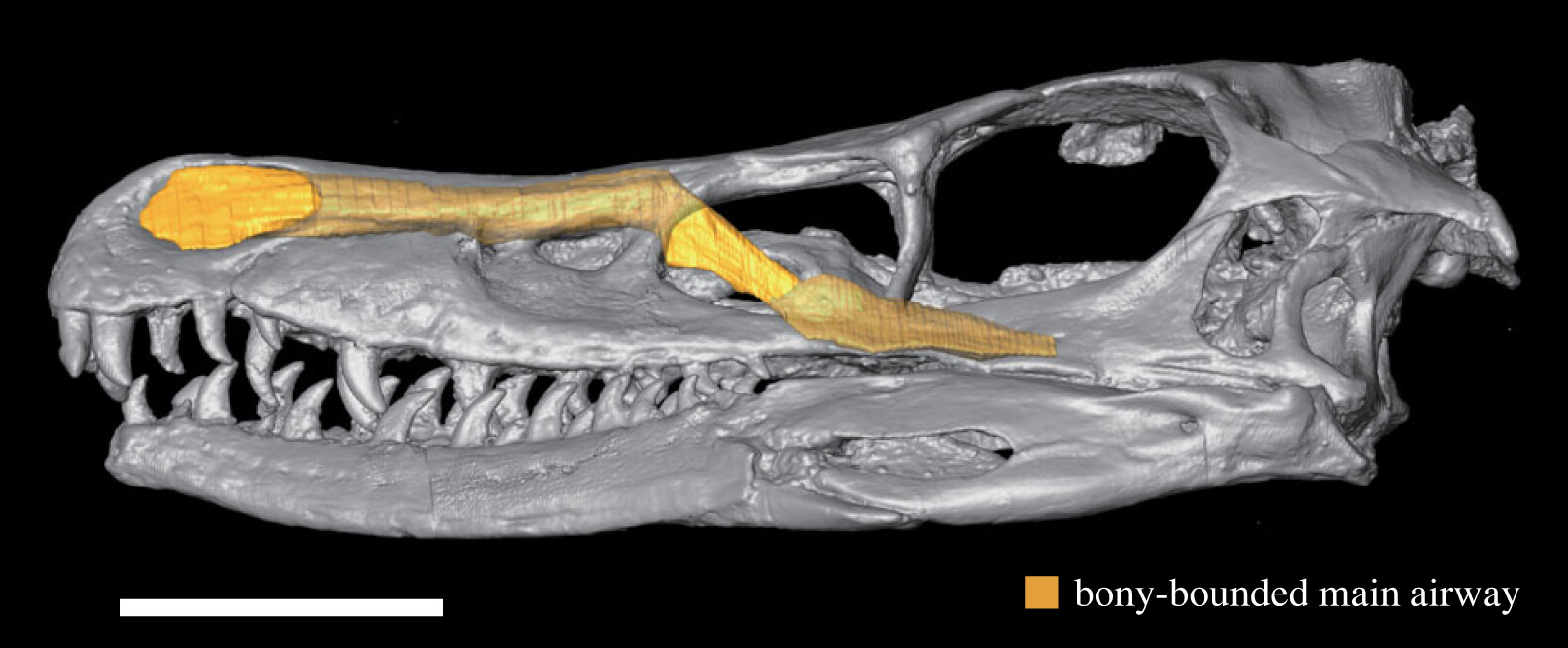
3D scan and nasal cavity reconstruction of V. mongoliensis skull MPC-D 100/54

Velociraptor was warm-blooded to some degree, as it required a significant amount of energy to hunt. Modern animals that possess feathery or furry coats, like Velociraptor did, tend to be warm-blooded, since these coverings function as insulation. However, bone growth rates in dromaeosaurids and some early birds suggest a more moderate metabolism, compared with most modern warm-blooded mammals and birds. The kiwi is similar to dromaeosaurids in anatomy, feather type, bone structure and even the narrow anatomy of the nasal passages (usually a key indicator of metabolism). The kiwi is a highly active, if specialized, flightless bird, with a stable body temperature and a fairly low resting metabolic rate, making it a good model for the metabolism of primitive birds and dromaeosaurids.

In 2023, Seishiro Tada and team examined the nasal cavities of ectotherm (cold-blooded) or endotherm (warm-blooded) species, in order to evaluate the thermoregulatory physiology of non-avian dinosaurs compared to these groups. They found that the size of the nasal cavity relative to the head size of extant endotherms is larger than those of extant ectotherms, and among taxa, Velociraptor was recovered below the extant endotherms level by reconstructing its nasal respiratory cavity. Tada with team suggested that Velociraptor and most other non-avian dinosaurs may not have possessed a fully or well-developed nasal thermoregulation apparatus as modern endothermic animals do.

=== Paleopathology ===
Norell with colleagues in 1995 reported one V. mongoliensis skull bearing two parallel rows of small punctures on its frontal bones that, upon closer examination, match the spacing and size of Velociraptor teeth. They suggested that the wound was likely inflicted by another Velociraptor during a fight within the species. Because its bone structure shows no sign of healing near the bite wounds and the overall specimen was not scavenged, this individual was likely killed by this fatal wound. In 2001 Molnar and team noted that this specimen is MPC-D 100/976 hailing from the Tugrik Shireh locality, which has also yielded the Fighting Dinosaurs specimen.

In 2012 David Hone and team reported another injured Velociraptor specimen (MPC-D 100/54, roughly a sub-adult individual) found with the bones of an azhdarchid pterosaur within its stomach cavity, was carrying or recovering from an injury sustained to one broken rib. From evidence on the pterosaur bones, which were devoid of pitting or deformations from digestion, the Velociraptor died shortly after, possibly from the earlier injury. Nevertheless, the team noted that this broken ribs shows signs of bone healing.

== Paleoenvironment ==
=== Bayan Mandahu Formation ===
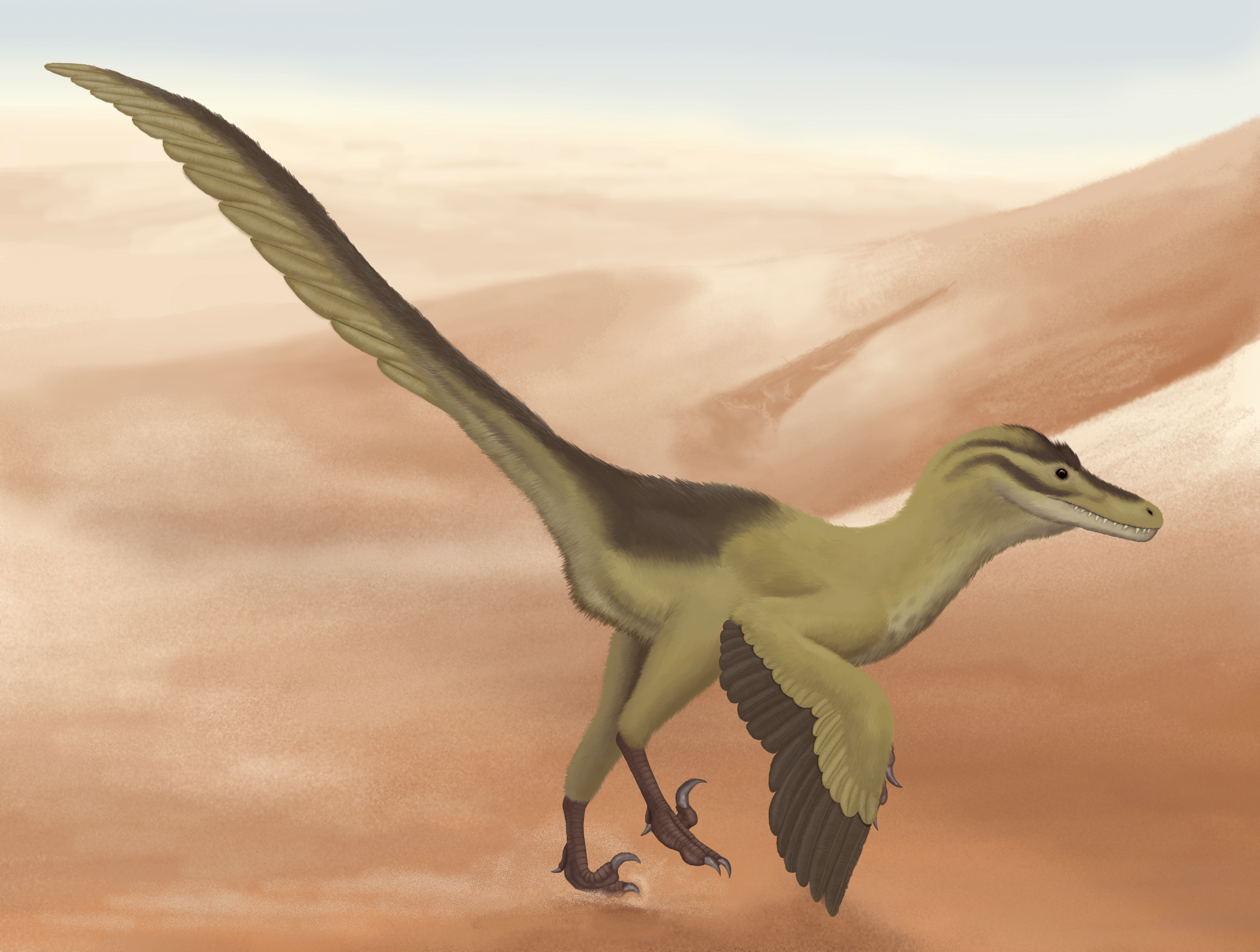
Restoration of related Linheraptor in paleoenvironment

In both Bayan Mandahu and Djadochta formations many of the same genera were present, though they varied at the species level. These differences in species composition may be due a natural barrier separating the two formations, which are relatively close to each other geographically. However, given the lack of any known barrier which would cause the specific faunal compositions found in these areas, it is more likely that those differences indicate a slight time difference.

V. osmolskae lived alongside the ankylosaurid Pinacosaurus mephistocephalus; alvarezsaurid Linhenykus; closely related dromaeosaurid Linheraptor; oviraptorids Machairasaurus and Wulatelong; protoceratopsids Bagaceratops and Protoceratops hellenikorhinus; and troodontids Linhevenator, Papiliovenator, and Philovenator. Sediments across the formation indicate a similar depositional environment to that of the Djadochta Formation.

=== Djadochta Formation ===
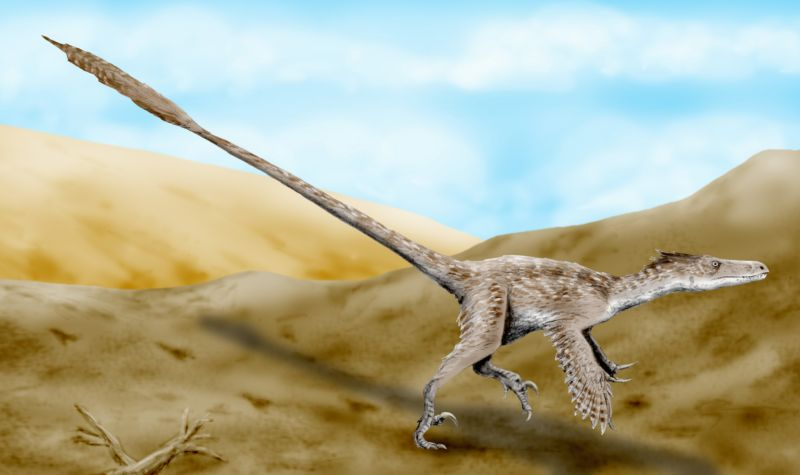
Restoration of V. mongoliensis in the arid Djadochta settings

Known specimens of Velociraptor mongoliensis have been recovered from the Djadochta Formation (also spelled Djadokhta), in the Mongolian province of Ömnögovi. This geological formation is estimated to date back to the Campanian stage (between 75 million and 71 million years ago) of the Late Cretaceous epoch. The abundant sediments—sands, sandstones, or caliche—of the Djadochta Formation were deposited by eolian (wind) processes in arid settings with fields of sand dunes and only intermittent streams, as indicated by very sparse fluvial (river-deposited) sedimentation, under a semi-arid climate.

The Djadochta Formation is separated into a lower Bayn Dzak Member and upper Turgrugyin Member. V. mongoliensis is known from both members, represented by numerous specimens. The Bayn Dzak Member (mainly Bayn Dzak locality) has yielded the oviraptorid Oviraptor; ankylosaurid Pinacosaurus grangeri; protoceratopsid Protoceratops andrewsi; and troodontid Saurornithoides. The younger Turgrugyin Member (mainly Tugriken Shireh locality) has produced the bird Elsornis; dromaeosaurid Mahakala: ornithomimid Aepyornithomimus; and protoceratopsid Protoceratops andrewsi.

V. mongoliensis has been found at many of the most famous and prolific Djadochta localities. The type specimen was discovered at the Flaming Cliffs site (sublocality of the larger Bayn Dzak locality/region), while the "Fighting Dinosaurs" were found at the Tugrik Shire locality (also known as Tugrugeen Shireh and many other spellings). The latter is notorious for its exceptional in situ fossil preservation. Based on deposits (such as structureless sandstones), it has been concluded that a large number of specimens were buried alive during powerful sand-bearing events, common to these paleoenvironments.

== Cultural significance ==
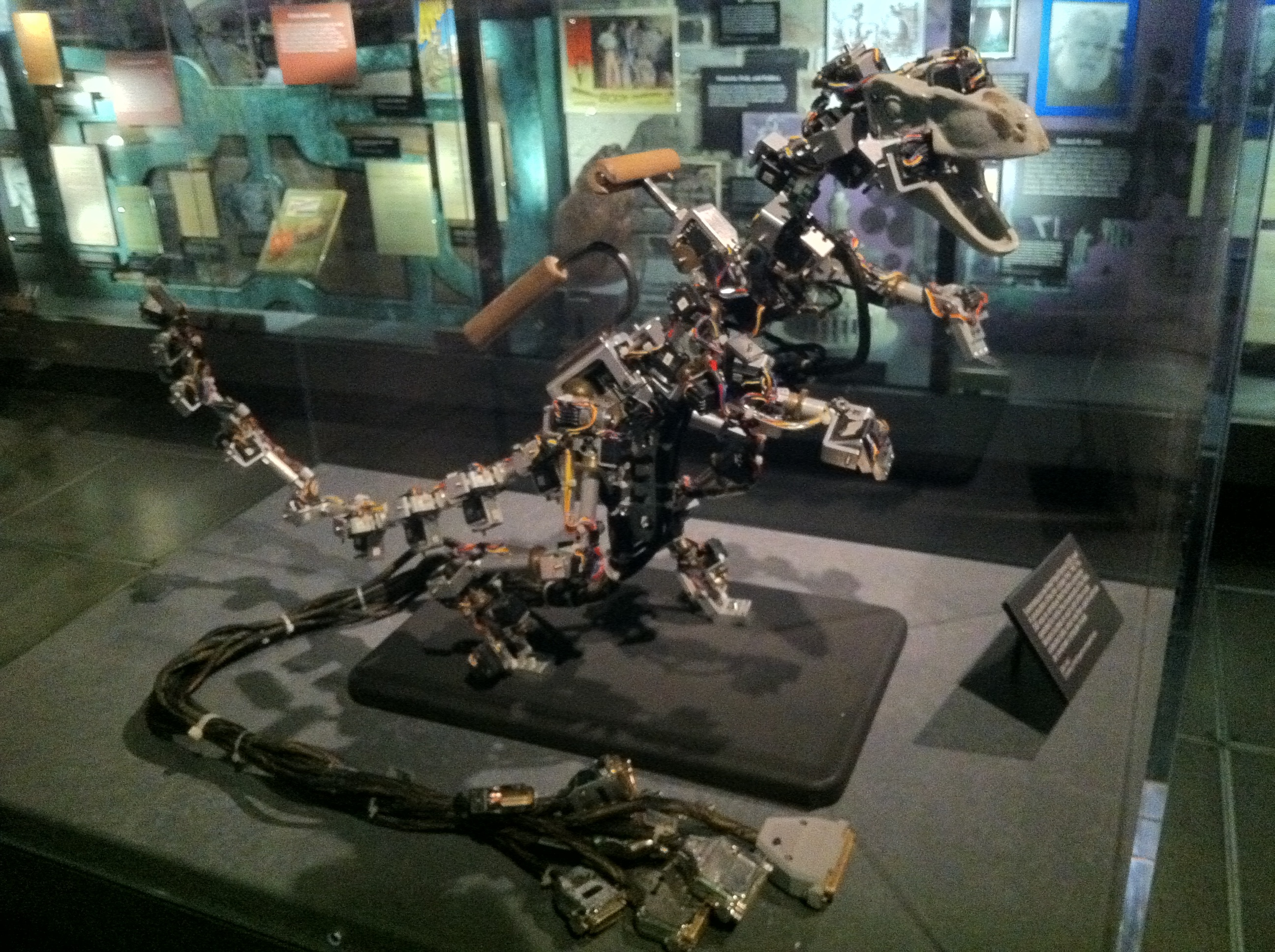
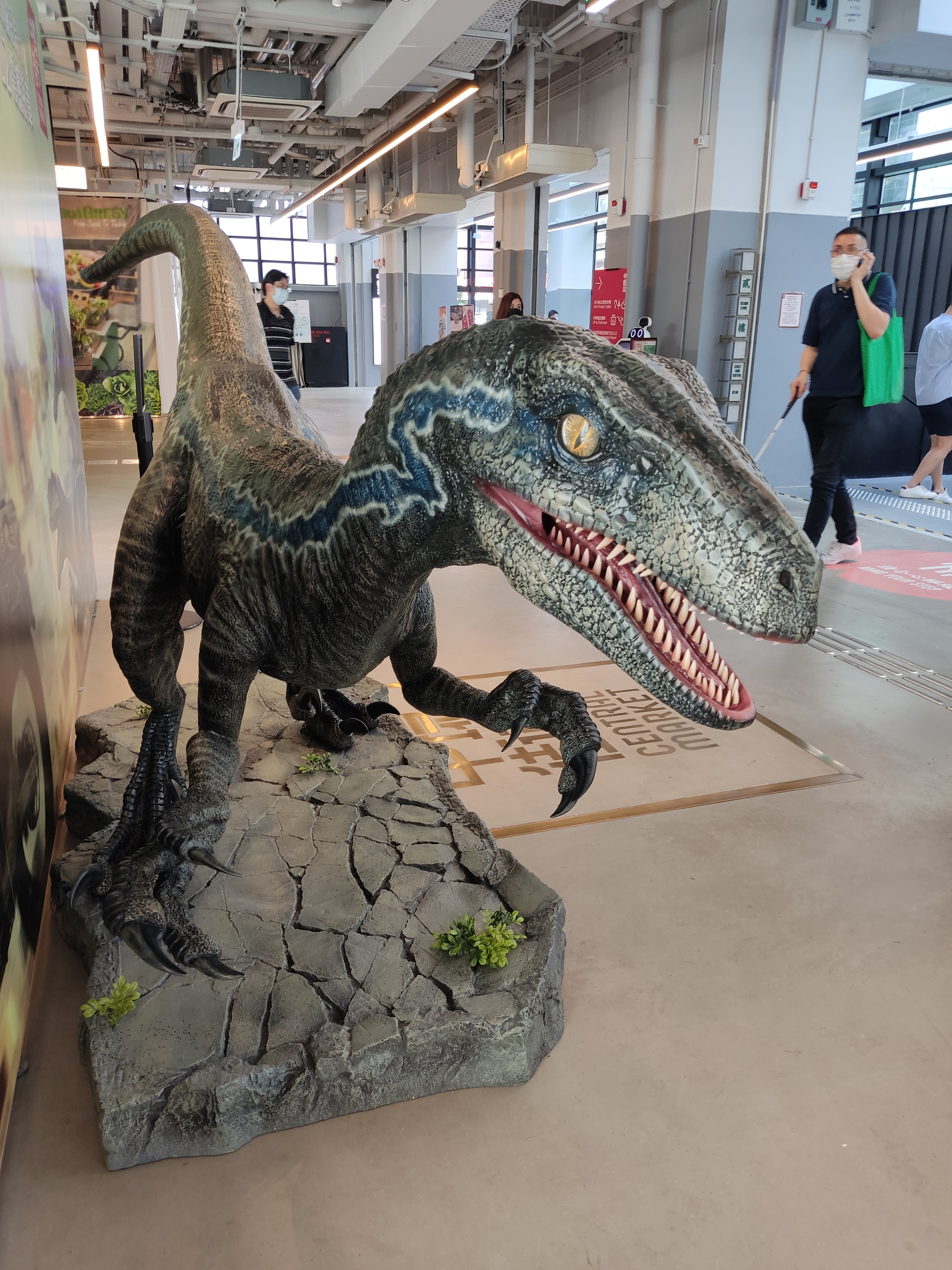
The "Dinosaur Input Device" Velociraptor used for creating some of the CGI effects in Jurassic Park (left), and the design from the Jurassic World trilogy, Hong Kong (right)

Velociraptor is commonly perceived as a vicious and cunning killer thanks to their portrayal in the 1990 novel Jurassic Park by Michael Crichton and its 1993 film adaptation, directed by Steven Spielberg. The "raptors" portrayed in Jurassic Park were actually modeled after the closely related dromaeosaurid Deinonychus. Paleontologists in both the novel and film excavate a skeleton in Montana, far from the central Asian range of Velociraptor but characteristic of the Deinonychus range. Crichton met with the discoverer of Deinonychus, John Ostrom, several times at Yale University to discuss details of the animal's possible range of behaviors and appearance. Crichton at one point apologetically told Ostrom that he had decided to use the name Velociraptor in place of Deinonychus because the former name was "more dramatic." According to Ostrom, Crichton stated that the Velociraptor of the novel was based on Deinonychus in almost every detail, and that only the name had been changed. The Jurassic Park filmmakers also requested all of Ostrom's published papers on Deinonychus during production. They portrayed the animals with the size, proportions, and snout shape of Deinonychus rather than Velociraptor.

Production on Jurassic Park began before the discovery of the large dromaeosaurid Utahraptor was made public in 1991, but as Jody Duncan wrote about this discovery: "Later, after we had designed and built the raptor, there was a discovery of a raptor skeleton in Utah, which they labeled 'super-slasher.' They had uncovered the largest Velociraptor to date and it measured five-and-a-half-feet tall, just like ours. So we designed it, we built it, and then they discovered it. That still boggles my mind." Spielberg's name was briefly considered for naming of the new dinosaur in exchange for funding of field work, but no agreement was reached.

Jurassic Park and its sequel The Lost World: Jurassic Park were released before the discovery that dromaeosaurs had feathers, so the Velociraptor in both films were depicted as scaled and featherless. For Jurassic Park III, the male Velociraptor was given quill-like structures along the back of the head and neck, but these structures do not resemble the feathers that Velociraptor would have had in reality due to reasons of continuity. The Jurassic World sequel trilogy ignored the feathers of Velociraptor, adhering to the designs from Jurassic Park. However, the dromaeosaur Pyroraptor was feathered for Jurassic World Dominion, along with other changes such as stiffening the tail to account for ossified tendons and de-pronating the hands.

== See also ==
- Fighting Dinosaurs
- Timeline of dromaeosaurid research
