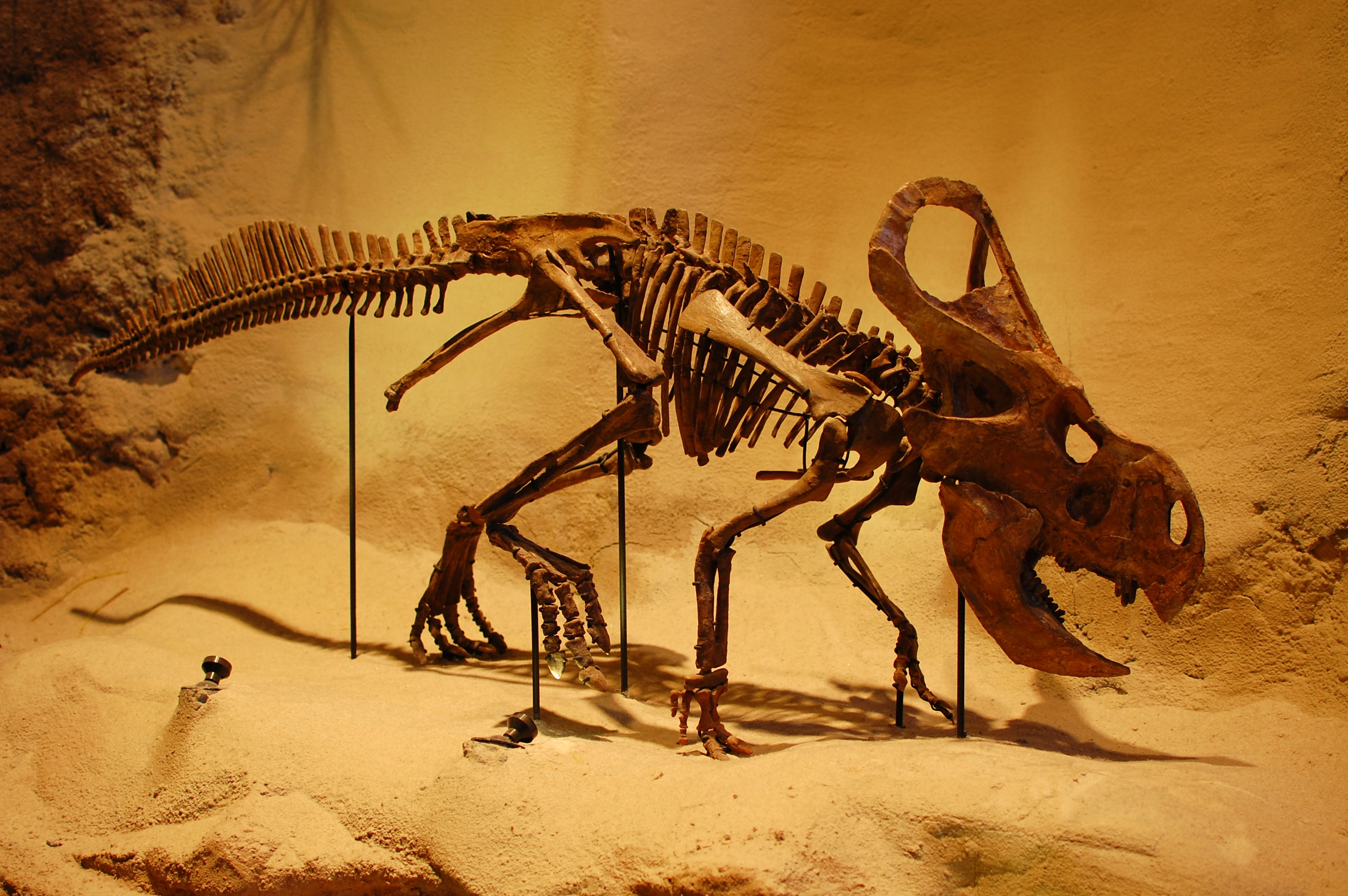
- Mounted P. andrewsi skeleton, Carnegie Museum of Natural History

Scientific classification
- Kingdom: Animalia
- Phylum: Chordata
- Class: Reptilia
- Clade: Dinosauria
- Clade: †Ornithischia
- Clade: †Ceratopsia
- Clade: †Coronosauria
- Family: †Protoceratopsidae
- Genus: †Protoceratops; Granger & Gregory, 1923

Type species
- †Protoceratops andrewsi Granger & Gregory, 1923

Other species
- †P. hellenikorhinus Lambert et al., 2001

= Protoceratops =

Protoceratops Temporal range: Late Cretaceous, ~75–71 Ma

Genus of Dinosaur (fossil)

Protoceratops (/ˌproʊtoʊˈsɛrətɒps/; lit. 'first horned face') is a genus of small protoceratopsid dinosaurs that lived in Asia during the Late Cretaceous, around 75 to 71 million years ago. The genus Protoceratops includes two species: P. andrewsi and the larger P. hellenikorhinus. The former was described in 1923 with fossils from the Mongolian Djadokhta Formation, and the latter in 2001 with fossils from the Chinese Bayan Mandahu Formation. Protoceratops was initially believed to be an ancestor of ankylosaurians and larger ceratopsians, such as Triceratops and relatives, until the discoveries of other protoceratopsids. Populations of P. andrewsi may have evolved into Bagaceratops rozhdestvenskyi through anagenesis.

Protoceratops were small ceratopsians, up to 2–2.5 m (6.6–8.2 ft) long and around 62–104 kg (137–229 lb) in body mass. While adults were largely quadrupedal, juveniles had the capacity to walk around bipedally if necessary. They were characterized by a proportionally large skull, short and stiff neck, and neck frill. The frill was likely used for display or intraspecific combat, as well as protection of the neck and anchoring of jaw muscles. A horn-like structure was present over the nose, which varied from a single structure in P. andrewsi to a double, paired structure in P. hellenikorhinus. The "horn" and frill were highly variable in shape and size across individuals of the same species, but there is no evidence of sexual dimorphism. They had a prominent parrot-like beak at the tip of the jaws. P. andrewsi had a pair of cylindrical, blunt teeth near the tip of the upper jaw. The forelimbs had five fingers of which only the first three bore wide and flat unguals. The feet were wide and had four toes with flattened, shovel-like unguals, which would have been useful for digging through the sand. The hindlimbs were longer than the forelimbs. The tail was long and had an enigmatic sail-like structure, which may have been used for display, swimming, or metabolic reasons.

Protoceratops, like many other ceratopsians, were herbivores equipped with prominent jaws and teeth suited for chopping foliage and other plant material. They are thought to have lived in highly sociable groups of mixed ages. They appear to have cared for their young. They laid soft-shelled eggs, a rare occurrence in dinosaurs. During maturation, the skull and neck frill underwent rapid growth. Protoceratops were hunted by Velociraptor, and one particularly famous specimen (the Fighting Dinosaurs) preserves a pair of them locked in combat. Protoceratops used to be characterized as nocturnal because of the large scleral ring around the eye, but they are now thought to have been cathemeral (active at dawn and dusk).

== History of discovery ==
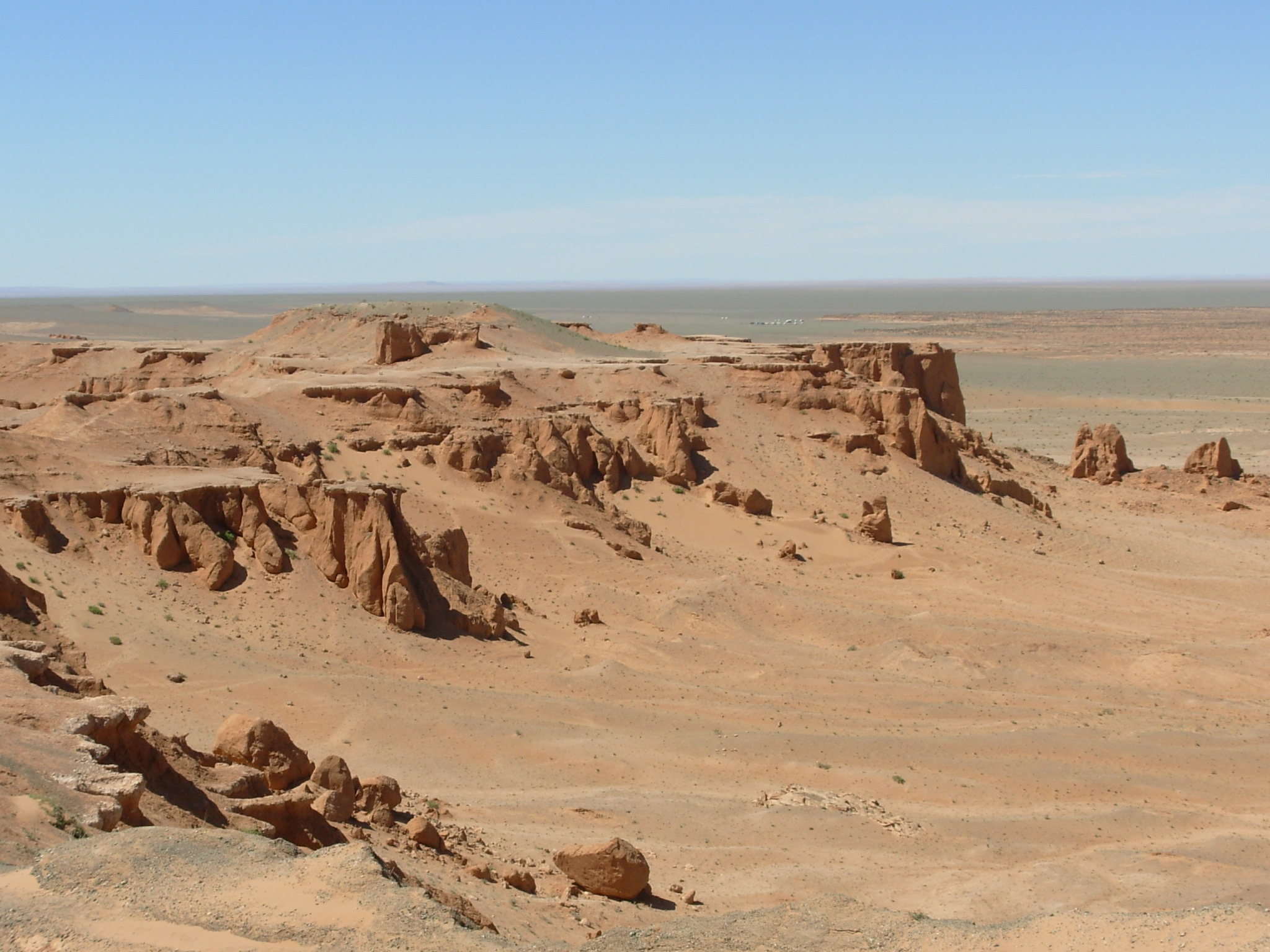
Flaming Cliffs of Mongolia. This highly fossiliferous locality of the Gobi Desert yielded the first known remains of Protoceratops.

In 1900 Henry Fairfield Osborn suggested that Central Asia may have been the center of origin of most animal species, including humans, which caught the attention of explorer and zoologist Roy Chapman Andrews. This idea later gave rise to the First (1916 to 1917), Second (1919) and Third (1921 to 1930) Central Asiatic Expeditions to China and Mongolia, organized by the American Museum of Natural History under the direction of Osborn and field leadership of Andrews. The team of the third expedition arrived in Beijing in 1921 for the final preparations and started working in the field in 1922. During late 1922 the expedition explored the famous Flaming Cliffs of the Shabarakh Usu region of the Djadokhta Formation, Gobi Desert, now known as the Bayn Dzak region. On 2 September, the photographer James B. Shackelford discovered a partial juvenile skull—which would become the holotype specimen (AMNH 6251) of Protoceratops—in reddish sandstones. It was subsequently analyzed by the paleontologist Walter W. Granger who identified it as reptilian. On 21 September, the expedition returned to Beijing, and even though it was set up to look for remains of human ancestors, the team collected numerous dinosaur fossils and thus provided insights into the rich fossil record of Asia. Back in Beijing, the skull Shackelford had found was sent to the American Museum of Natural History for further study, after which Osborn reached out to Andrews and team via cable, notifying them about the importance of the specimen.

In 1923 the expedition again prospected the Flaming Cliffs, this time discovering even more specimens of Protoceratops and also the first remains of Oviraptor, Saurornithoides and Velociraptor. Most notably, the team discovered the first fossilized dinosaur eggs near the holotype of Oviraptor and given how abundant Protoceratops was, the nest was attributed to this taxon. This would later result in the interpretation of Oviraptor as an egg-thief. In the same year, Granger and William K. Gregory formally described the new genus and species Protoceratops andrewsi based on the holotype skull. The specific name, andrewsi, is in honor of Andrews for his prominent leadership during the expeditions. They identified Protoceratops as an ornithischian dinosaur closely related to ceratopsians representing a possible common ancestor between ankylosaurs and ceratopsians. Since Protoceratops was more primitive than any other known ceratopsian at that time, Granger and Gregory coined the new family Protoceratopsidae, mostly characterized by the lack of horns. The co-authors also agreed with Osborn that Asia, if more thoroughly explored, could solve many major evolutionary gaps in the fossil record. Although not stated in the original description, the generic name, Protoceratops, is intended to mean "first horned face" as it was believed that Protoceratops represented an early ancestor of ceratopsids. Other researchers immediately noted the importance of the Protoceratops finds, and the genus was hailed as the "long-sought ancestor of Triceratops". Most fossils were in an excellent state of preservation with even scleral rings (delicate ocular bones) preserved in some specimens, quickly making Protoceratops one of the best-known dinosaurs from Asia.

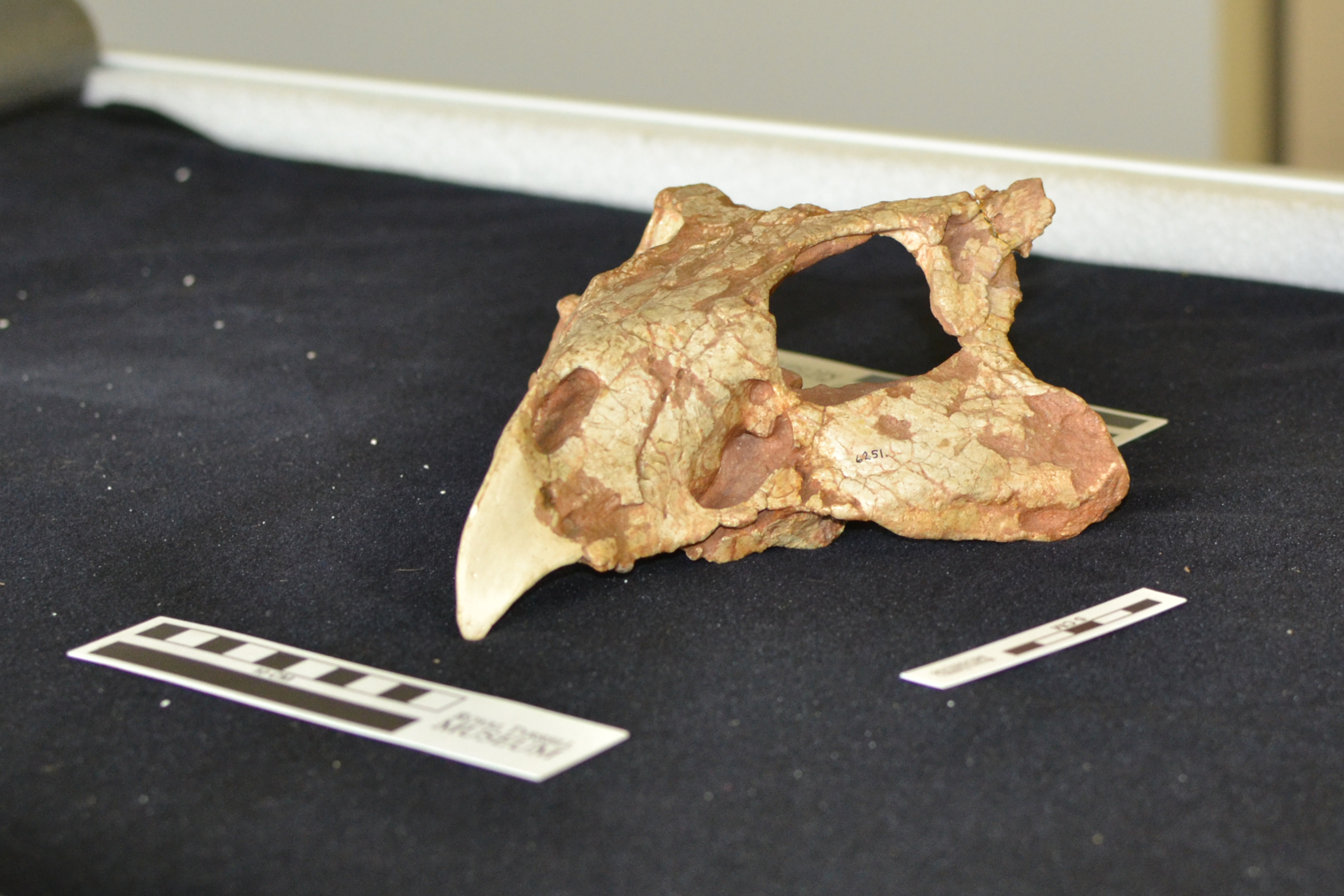
Holotype skull of P. andrewsi, collected during the Third Central Asiatic Expedition

After spending much of 1924 making plans for the next fieldwork seasons, in 1925 Andrews and team explored the Flaming Cliffs yet again. During this year more eggs and nests were collected, alongside well-preserved and complete specimens of Protoceratops. By this time, Protoceratops had become one of the most abundant dinosaurs of the region with more than 100 specimens known, including skulls and skeletons of multiple individuals at different growth stages. Though more remains of Protoceratops were collected in later years of the expeditions, they were most abundant in the 1922 to 1925 seasons. Gregory and Charles C. Mook published another description of Protoceratops in 1925, discussing its anatomy and relationships. Thanks to the large collection of skulls found in the expeditions, they concluded that Protoceratops represented a ceratopsian more primitive than ceratopsids and not an ankylosaur-ceratopsian ancestor. In 1940, Barnum Brown and Erich Maren Schlaikjer described the anatomy of P. andrewsi in extensive detail using newly prepared specimens from the Asiatic expeditions.

In 1963, the Mongolian paleontologist Demberelyin Dashzeveg reported the discovery of a new fossiliferous locality of the Djadokhta Formation: Tugriken Shireh. Like the neighbouring Bayn Dzak, this new locality contained an abundance of Protoceratops fossils. During the 1960s to 1970s, Polish-Mongolian and Russian-Mongolian paleontological expeditions collected new, partial to complete specimens of Protoceratops at this locality, making this dinosaur species a common occurrence in Tugriken Shireh. Since its discovery, the Tugriken Shireh locality has yielded some of the most significant specimens of Protoceratops, such as the Fighting Dinosaurs, in situ individuals—a preservation condition also known as "standing" individuals or specimens in some cases—, authentic nests, and small herd-like groups. Specimens from this locality are usually found in articulation, suggesting possible mass mortality events.

Stephan N. F. Spiekman and colleagues reported a partial P. andrewsi skull (RGM 818207) in the collections of the Naturalis Biodiversity Center, Netherlands in 2015. Since Protoceratops fossils are only found in the Gobi Desert of Mongolia and this specimen was likely discovered during the Central Asiatic Expeditions, the team concluded that this skull was probably acquired by Delft University between 1940 and 1972 as part of a collection transfer.

=== Species and synonyms ===
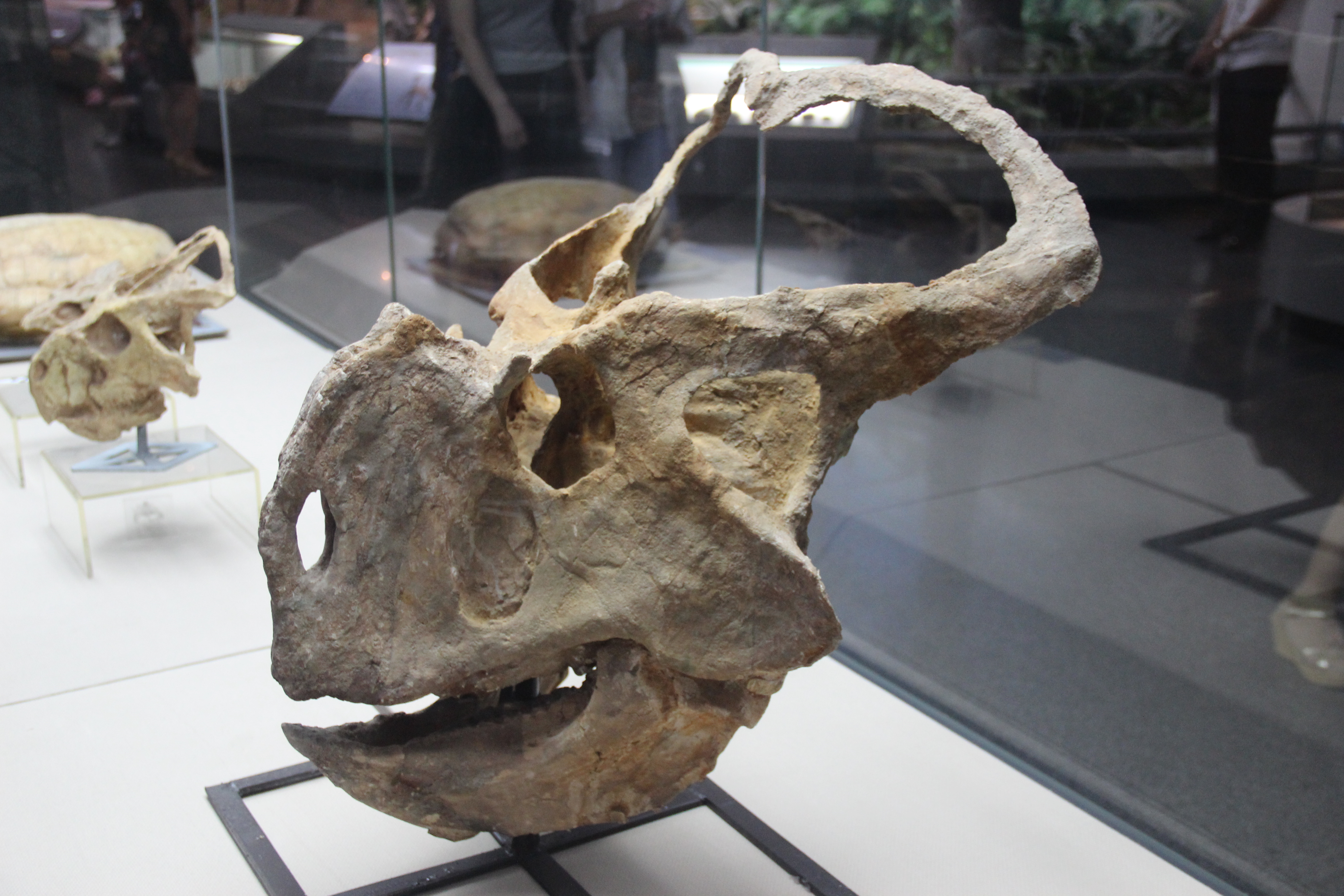
Holotype skull of P. hellenikorhinus at the Inner Mongolia Museum

Protoceratopsid remains were recovered in the 1970s from the Khulsan locality of the Barun Goyot Formation, Mongolia, during the work of several Polish-Mongolian paleontological expeditions. In 1975, Polish paleontologists Teresa Maryańska and Halszka Osmólska described a second species of Protoceratops which they named P. kozlowskii. This new species was based on the Khulsan material, mostly consisting of juvenile skull specimens. The specific name, kozlowskii, is in tribute to the Polish paleontologist Roman Kozłowski. They also named the new genus and species of protoceratopsid Bagaceratops rozhdestvenskyi, known from specimens of the nearby Hermiin Tsav locality. In 1990 the Russian paleontologist Sergei Mikhailovich Kurzanov referred additional material from Hermiin Tsav to P. kozlowskii. However, he noted that there were enough differences between P. andrewsi and P. kozlowskii, and erected the new genus and combination Breviceratops kozlowskii. Though Breviceratops has been regarded as a synonym and juvenile stage of Bagaceratops, Łukasz Czepiński in 2019 concluded that the former has enough anatomical differences to be considered as a separate taxon.

In 2001 Oliver Lambert with colleagues named a new and distinct species of Protoceratops, P. hellenikorhinus. The first known remains of P. hellenikorhinus were collected from the Bayan Mandahu locality of the Bayan Mandahu Formation, Inner Mongolia, in 1995 and 1996 during Sino-Belgian paleontological expeditions. The holotype (IMM 95BM1/1) and paratype (IMM 96BM1/4) specimens consist of large skulls lacking body remains. The holotype skull was found facing upwards, a pose that has been reported in Protoceratops specimens from Tugriken Shireh. The specific name, hellenikorhinus, is derived from Greek hellenikos (meaning Greek) and rhis (meaning nose) in reference to its broad and angular snout, which is reminiscent of the straight profiles of Greek sculptures. In 2017 abundant protoceratopsid material was reported from Alxa near Bayan Mandahu, and it may be preferable to P. hellenikorhinus.

Viktor Tereshchenko and Vladimir R. Alifanov in 2003 named a new protoceratopsid dinosaur from the Bayn Dzak locality, Bainoceratops efremovi. This genus was based on a few dorsal (back) vertebrae that were stated to differ from those of Protoceratops. In 2006 North American paleontologists Peter Makovicky and Mark A. Norell suggested that Bainoceratops may be synonymous with Protoceratops as most of the traits used to separate the former from the latter have been reported from other ceratopsians including Protoceratops itself, and they are more likely to fall within the wide intraspecific variation range of the concurring P. andrewsi. The authors Brenda J. Chinnery and Jhon R. Horner in 2007 during their description of Cerasinops stated that Bainoceratops, along with other dubious genera, was determined to be either a variant or immature specimen of other genera. Based on this reasoning, they excluded Bainoceratops from their phylogenetic analysis.

=== Eggs and nests ===
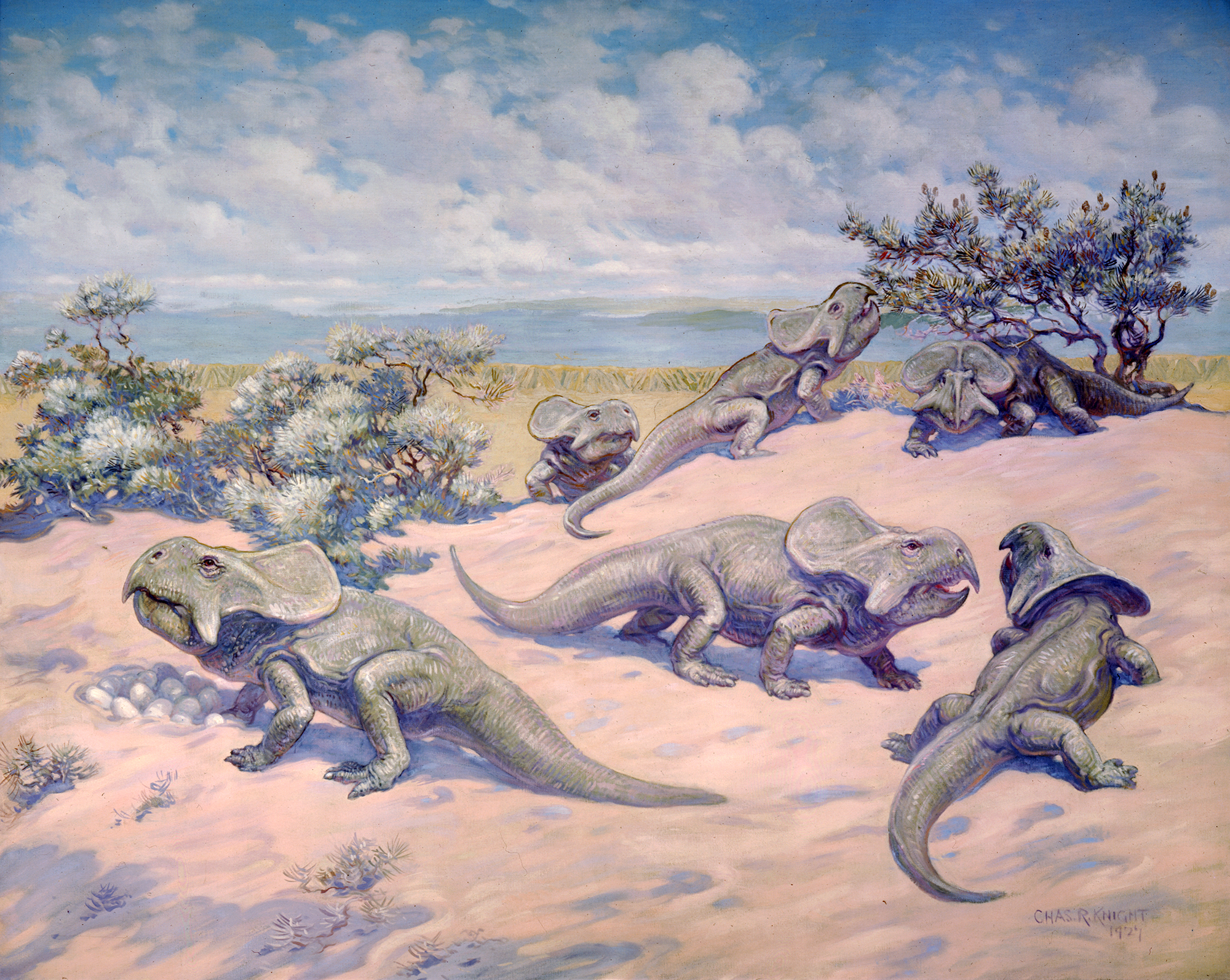
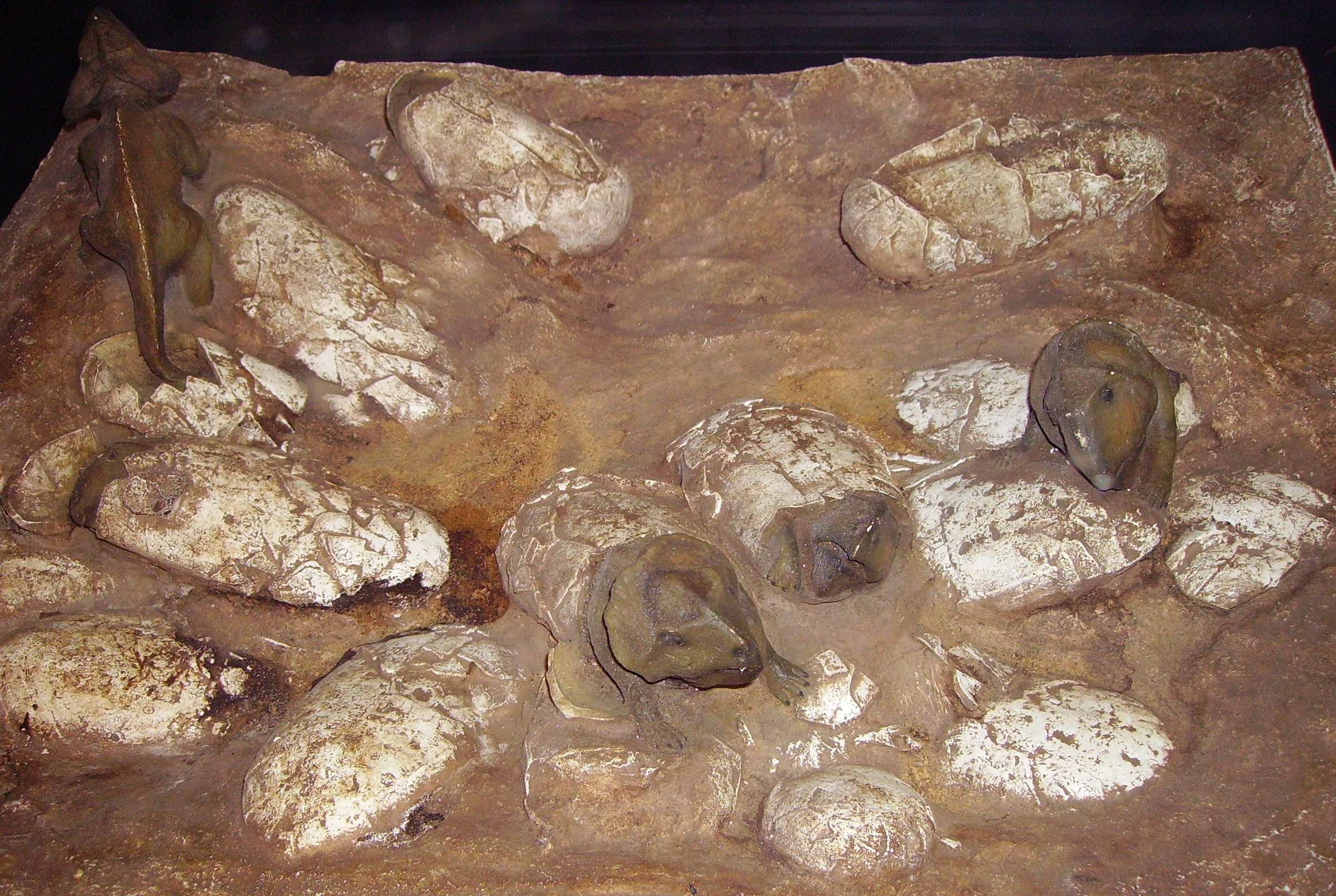
Life restoration from 1927 and model of Protoceratops eggs based on the Oviraptor nest AMNH 6508. This nest was originally thought to represent Protoceratops eggs.

As part of the Third Central Asiatic Expedition of 1923, Andrews and team discovered the holotype specimen of Oviraptor in association with some of the first known fossilized dinosaur eggs (nest AMNH 6508), in the Djadokhta Formation. Each egg was elongated and hard-shelled, and due to the proximity and high abundance of Protoceratops in the formation, these eggs were believed at the time to belong to this dinosaur. This resulted in the interpretation of the contemporary Oviraptor as an egg predatory animal, an interpretation also reflected in its generic name. In 1975, the Chinese paleontologist Zhao Zikui named the new oogenera Elongatoolithus and Macroolithus, including them in a new oofamily: the Elongatoolithidae. As the name implies, they represent elongated dinosaur eggs, including some of referred ones to Protoceratops.

In 1994 the Russian paleontologist Konstantin E. Mikhailov named the new oogenus Protoceratopsidovum from the Barun Goyot and Djadokhta formations, with the type species P. sincerum and additional P. fluxuosum and P. minimum. This ootaxon was firmly stated as belonging to protoceratopsid dinosaurs since they were the predominant dinosaurs where the eggs were found and some skeletons of Protoceratops were found in close proximity to Protoceratopsidovum eggs. More specifically, Mikhailov stated that P. sincerum and P. minimum were laid by Protoceratops, and P. fluxuosum by Breviceratops.

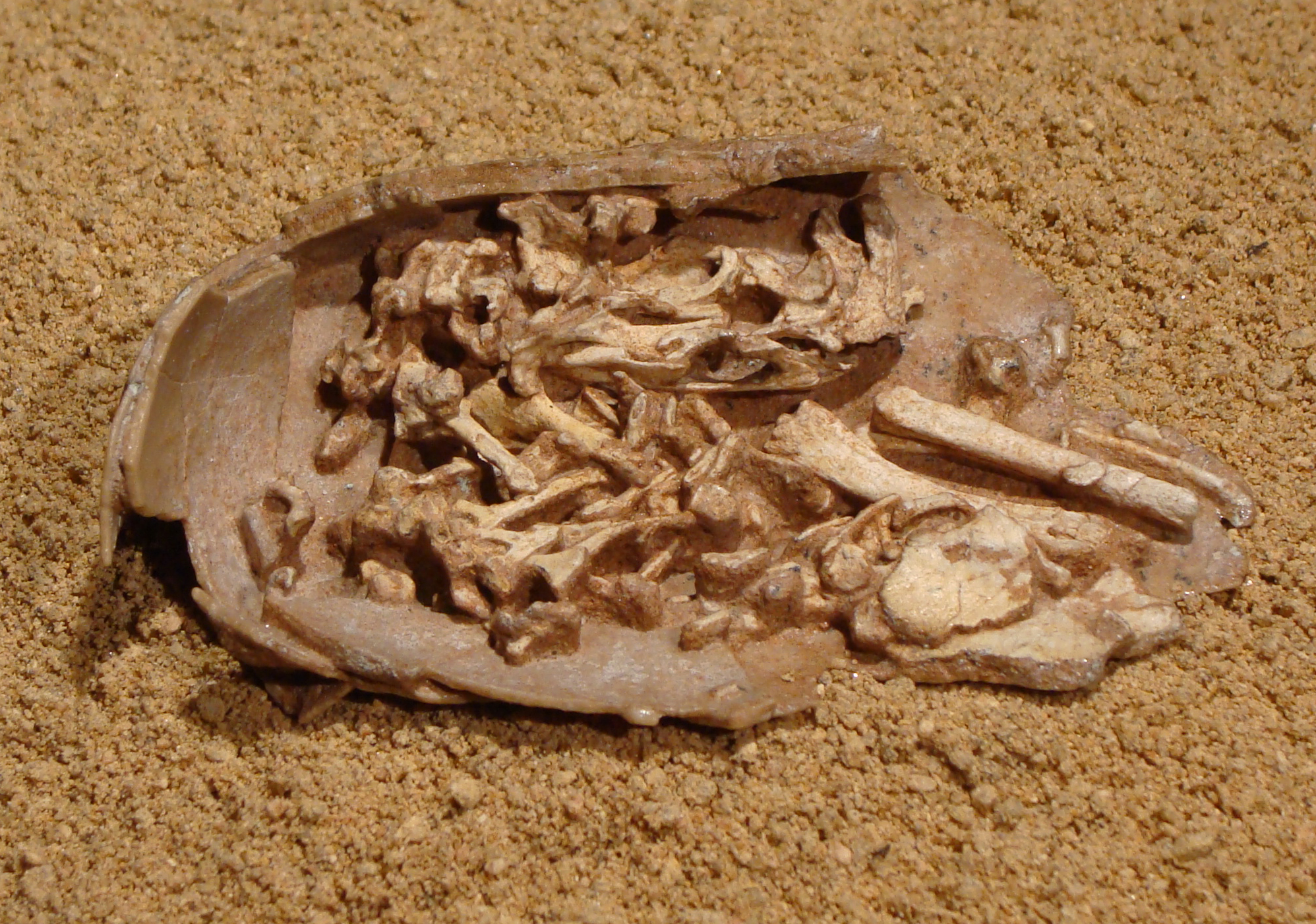
Oviraptorid embryo MPC-D 100/971, a specimen that shed light on the identity of elongatoolithid eggs

However, also during 1994, Norell and colleagues reported and briefly described a fossilized theropod embryo inside an egg (MPC-D 100/971) from the Djadokhta Formation. They identified this embryo as an oviraptorid dinosaur and the eggshell, upon close examination, turned out be that of elongatoolithid eggs and thereby the oofamily Elongatoolithidae was concluded to represent the eggs of oviraptorids. This find proved that the nest AMNH 6508 belonged to Oviraptor and rather than an egg-thief, the holotype was actually a mature individual that perished brooding the eggs. Moreover, phylogenetic analyses published in 2008 by Darla K. Zelenitsky and François Therrien have shown that Protoceratopsidovum represents the eggs of a maniraptoran more derived than oviraptorids and not Protoceratops. The description of the eggshell of Protoceratopsidovum has further confirmed that they in fact belong to a maniraptoran, possibly deinonychosaur taxon.

Nevertheless, in 2011 an authentic nest of Protoceratops was reported and described by David E. Fastovsky and colleagues. The nest (MPC-D 100/530) containing 15 articulated juveniles was collected from the Tugriken Shireh locality of the Djadokhta Formation during the work of Mongolian-Japanese paleontological expeditions. Gregory M. Erickson and team in 2017 reported an embryo-bearing egg clutch (MPC-D 100/1021) of Protoceratops from the also fossiliferous Ukhaa Tolgod locality, discovered during paleontological expeditions of the American Museum of Natural History and Mongolian Academy of Sciences. This clutch comprises at least 12 eggs and embryos with only 6 embryos preserving nearly complete skeletons. Norell with colleagues in 2020 examined fossilized remains around the eggs of this clutch which indicate a soft-shelled composition.

=== Fighting Dinosaurs ===
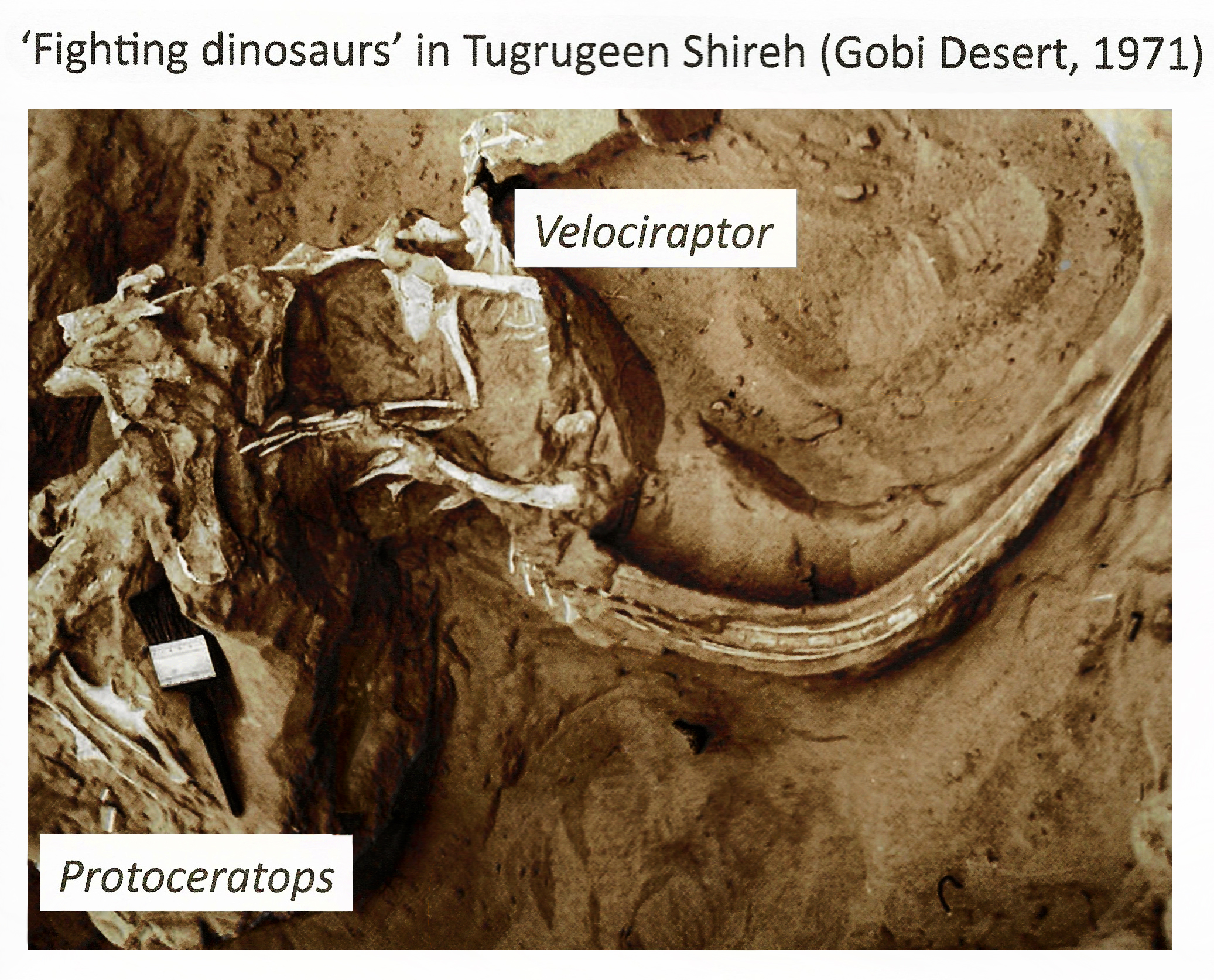
Fossil of the Fighting Dinosaurs as found in the field, 1971

The Fighting Dinosaurs specimen preserves a Protoceratops (MPC-D 100/512) and Velociraptor (MPC-D 100/25) fossilized in combat and provides an important window regarding direct evidence of predator-prey behavior in non-avian dinosaurs. In the 1960s and early 1970s, many Polish-Mongolian paleontological expeditions were conducted to the Gobi Desert with the objective of fossil findings. In 1971, the expedition explored several localities of the Djadokhta and Nemegt formations. During fieldwork on 3 August several fossils of Protoceratops and Velociraptor were found at the Tugriken Shire locality (Djadokhta Formation) including a block containing one of each. The individuals in this block were identified as a P. andrewsi and V. mongoliensis. Although the conditions surrounding their burial were not fully understood, it was clear that they died simultaneously in a struggle.

The specimen, nicknamed the "Fighting Dinosaurs", has been examined and studied by numerous researchers and paleontologists, and there are various opinions on how the animals were buried and preserved altogether. Though a drowning scenario has been proposed by Barsbold, such a hypothesis is considered unlikely given the arid paleoenvironments of the Djadokhta Formation. It is generally thought that they were buried alive by a sandstorm or a collapsed dune.

=== Skin impressions and footprints ===
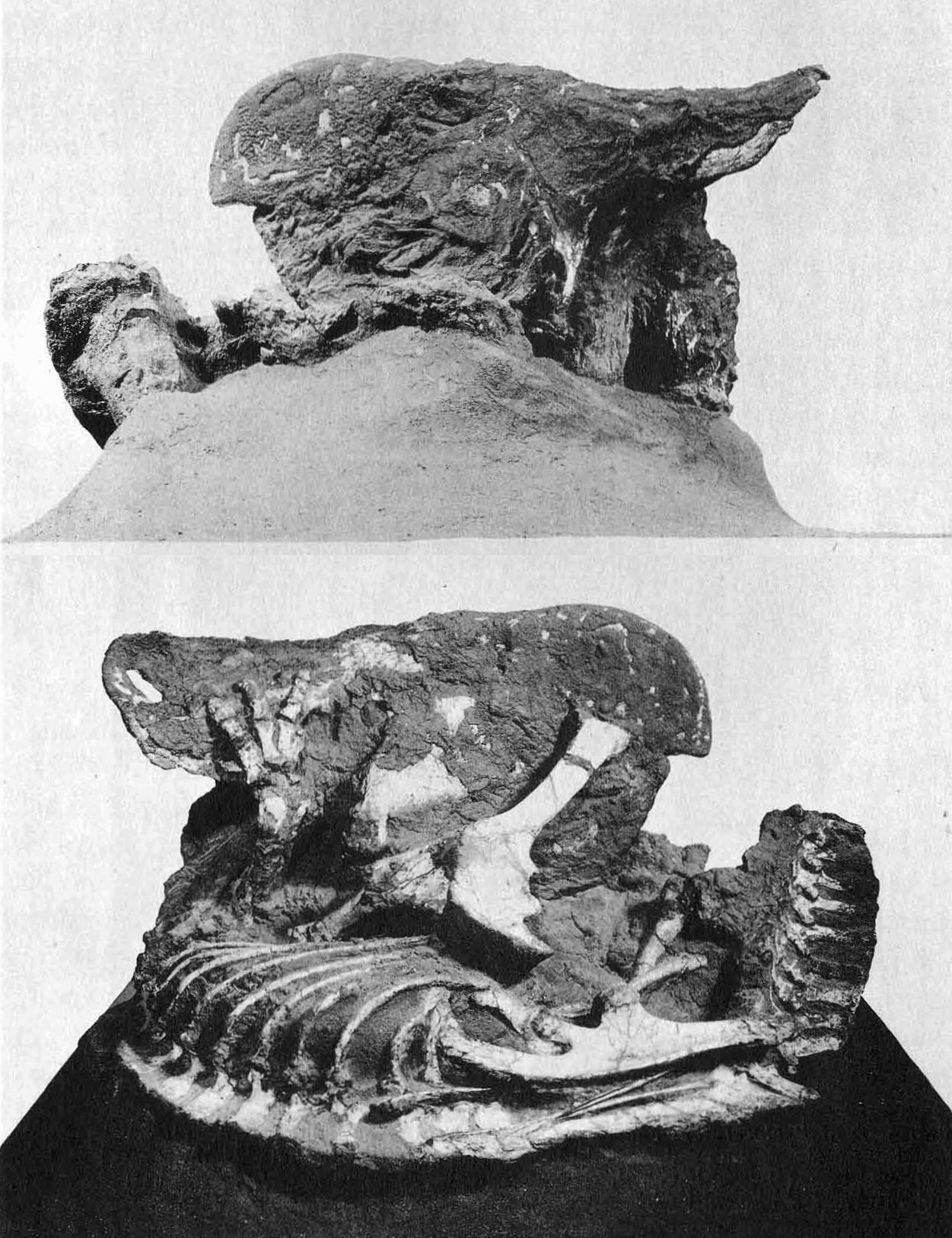
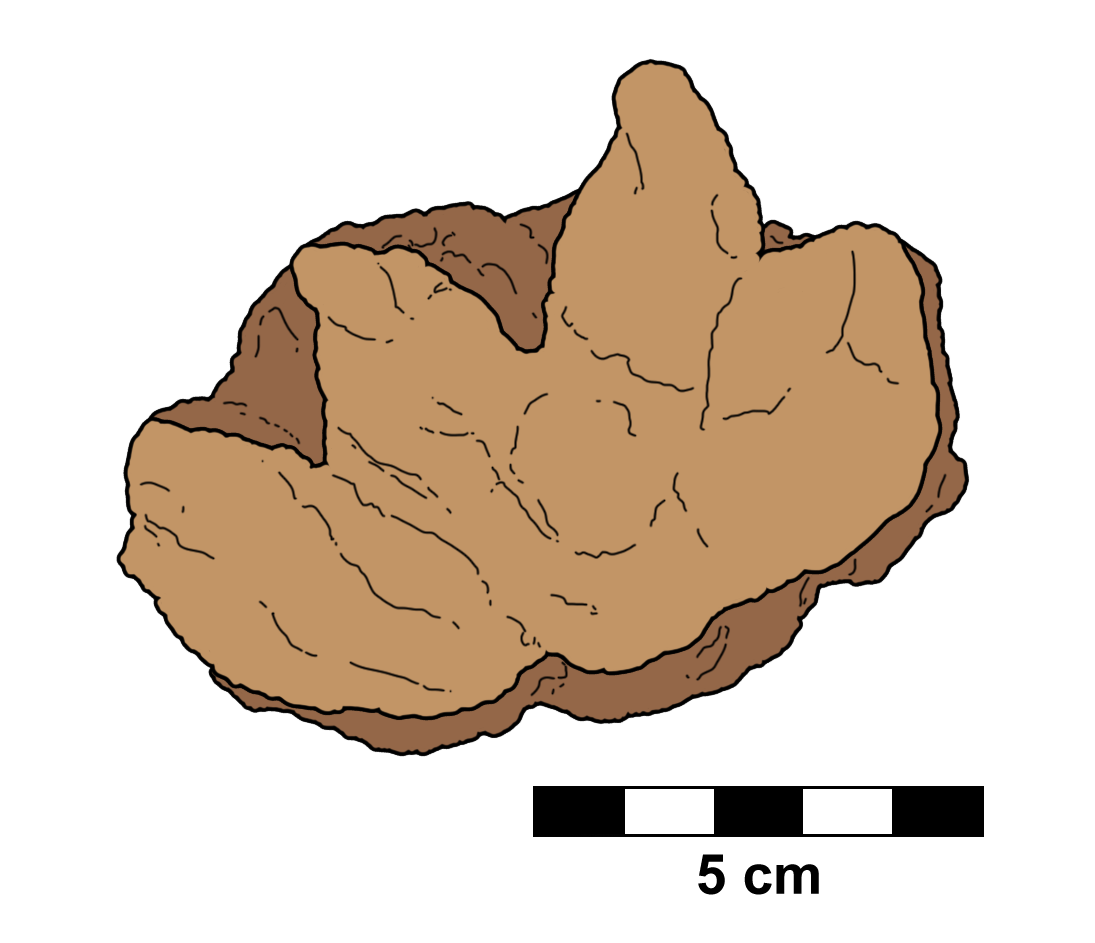
AMNH 6418 specimen with possible skin impressions (left), and line diagram of footprint associated with specimen ZPAL Mg D-II/3 (right)

During the Third Central Asiatic Expedition in 1923, a nearly complete Protoceratops skeleton (specimen AMNH 6418) was collected at the Flaming Cliffs. Unlike other specimens, it was discovered in a rolled-up position with its skull preserving a thin, hard, and wrinkled layer of matrix (surrounding sediments). This specimen was later described in 1940 by Brown and Schlaikjer, who discussed the nature of the matrix portion. They stated that this layer had a very skin-like texture and covered mostly the left side of the skull from the snout to the neck frill. Brown and Schlaikjer discarded the idea of possible skin impressions as this skin-like layer was likely a product of the decay and burial of the individual, making the sediments become highly attached to the skull.

The potential importance of these remains was unrecognized or given attention, and by 2020 the specimen has already been completely prepared losing all traces of this skin-like layer. Some elements were damaged in the process such as the rostrum. In 2022 Phil R. Bell and colleagues briefly described these potential soft tissues based on the photographs provided by Brown and Schlaikjer, as well as other ceratopsian soft tissues. However, although the initial perception was that the entire skin-like layer had been removed, photographs shared by Czepiński during the same year have revealed that the right side of the skull remains intact, retaining much of this layer and pending further analysis.

Also from the context of the Polish-Mongolian paleontological expeditions, in 1965 an articulated subadult Protoceratops skeleton (specimen ZPAL Mg D-II/3) was collected from the Bayn Dzak locality of the Djadokhta Formation. In the 2000s during the preparation of the specimen, a fossilized cast of a four-toed digitigrade footprint was found below the pelvic girdle. This footprint was described in 2012 by Grzegorz Niedźwiedzki and colleagues who considered it to represent one of the first reported finds of a dinosaur footprint in association with an articulated skeleton, and also the first one reported for Protoceratops. The limb elements of the skeleton of ZPAL Mg D-II/3 were described in 2019 by paleontologists Justyna Słowiak, Victor S. Tereshchenko and Łucja Fostowicz-Frelik. Tereshchenko in 2021 fully described the axial skeleton of this specimen.

== Description ==
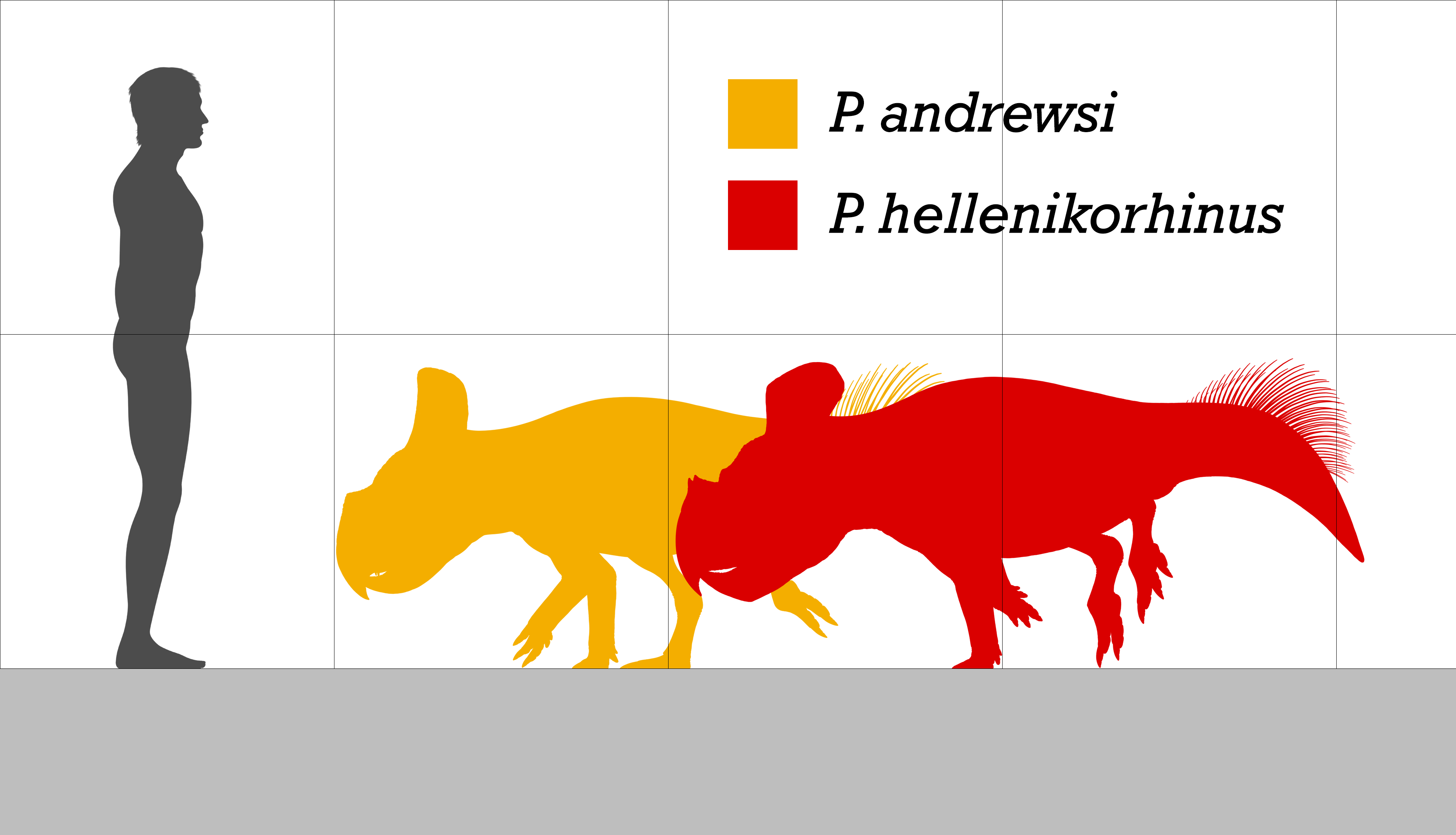
Size comparison of two Protoceratops species

Protoceratops was a relatively small-sized ceratopsian, with both P. andrewsi and P. hellenikorhinus estimated up to 2–2.5 m (6.6–8.2 ft) in length, and around 62–104 kg (137–229 lb) in body mass. Although similar in overall body size, the latter had a relatively greater skull length. Both species can be differentiated by the following characteristics:

- P. andrewsi – Two teeth were present at the premaxilla; the snout was low and long; the nasal horn was a single, pointed structure; the bottom edge of the dentary was slightly curved.
- P. hellenikorhinus – Absence of premaxillary teeth; the snout was tall and broad; the nasal horn was divided into two pointed ridges; the bottom edge of the dentary was straight.

=== Skull ===
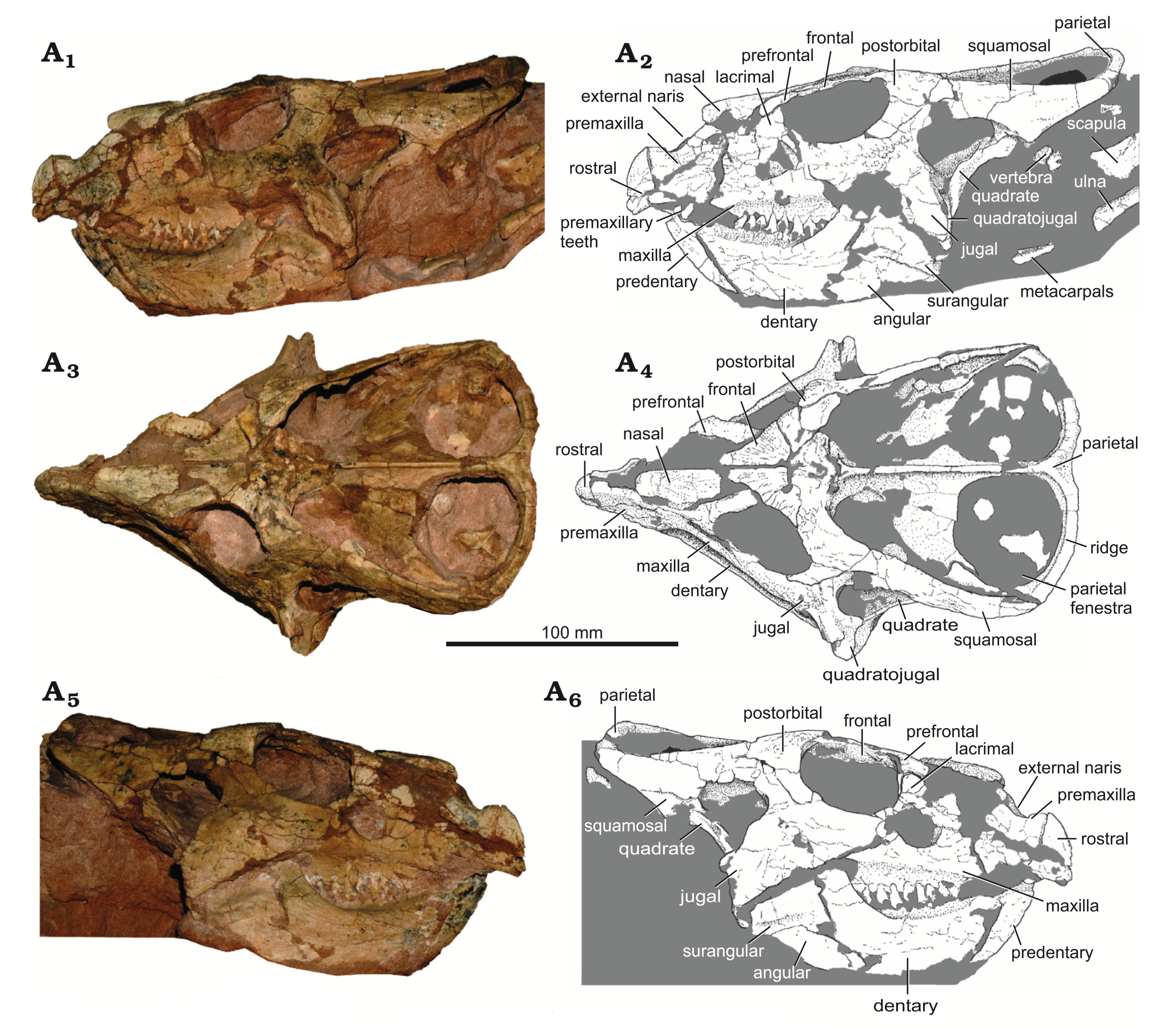
Skull of P. andrewsi (MPC-D 100/551) in left lateral (A1-A2), dorsal (A3-A4), and right lateral (A5-A6) views

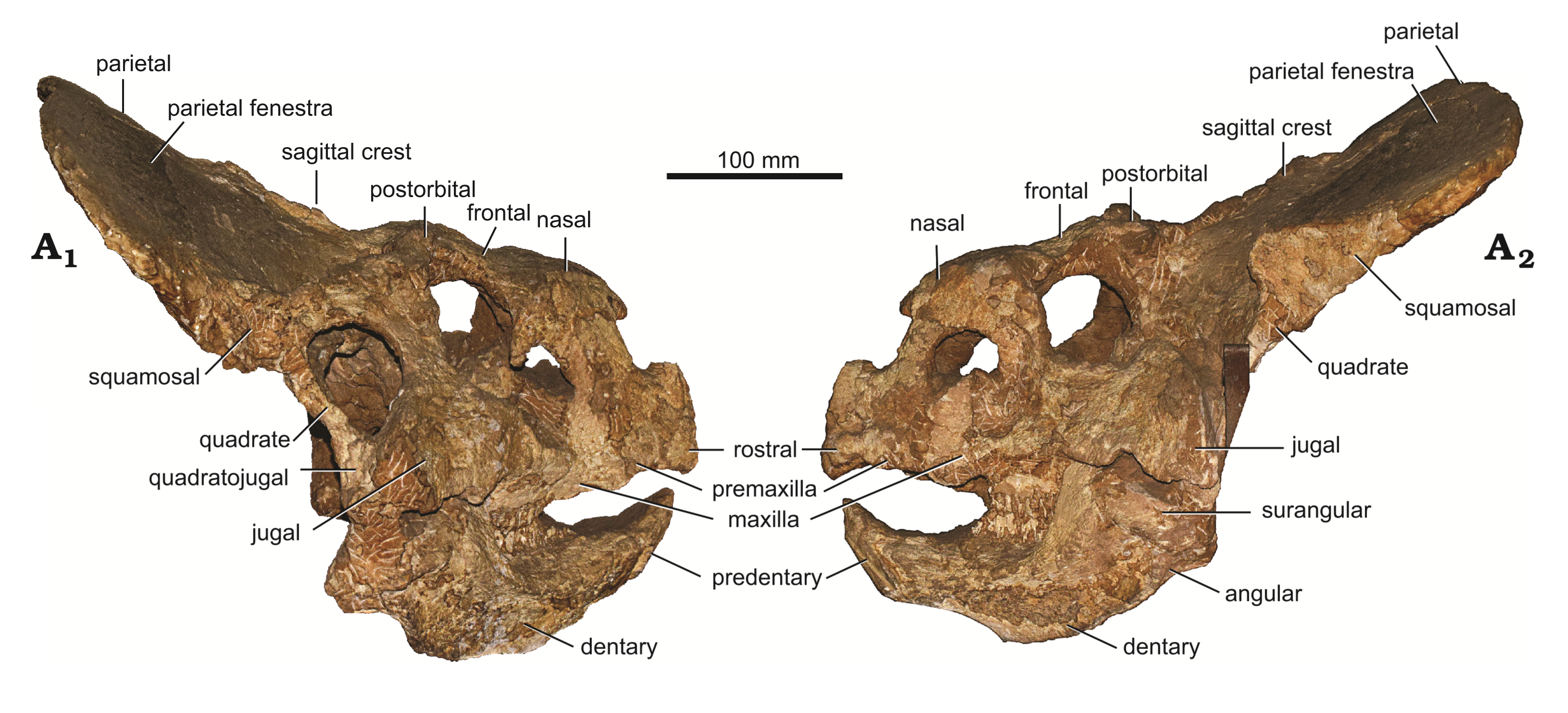
Skull of P. andrewsi (MPC-D 100/505) in right lateral (A1) and left lateral (A2) views

The skull of Protoceratops was relatively large compared to its body and robustly built. The skull of the type species, P. andrewsi, had an average total length of nearly 50 cm (500 mm). On the other hand P. hellenikorhinus had a total skull length of about 70 cm (700 mm). The rear of the skull gave form to a pronounced neck frill (also known as "parietal frill") mostly composed of the parietal and squamosal bones. The exact size and shape of the frill varied by individual; some had short, compact frills, while others had frills nearly half the length of the skull. The squamosal touched the jugal (cheekbone) and was very enlarged and high having a curved end that built the borders of the frill. The parietals were the posteriormost bones of the skull and major elements of the frill. In a top view they had a triangular shape and were joined by the frontals (bones of the skull roof). Both parietals were coossified (fused), creating a long ridge on the center of the frill. The jugal was deep and sharply developed and along with the quadratojugal they formed a horn-like extension that pointed to below at the lateral sides of the skull. The epijugal (tip region of the jugal) was separated from the jugal by a prominent suture; this suture was more noticeable in adults. The surfaces around the epijugal were coarse, indicating that it was covered by a horny sheath. Unlike the much derived ceratopsids, the frontal and postorbital bones of Protoceratops were flat and lacked horn cores or supraorbital horns. The palpebral (small spur-like bone) joined the prefrontal over the front of the orbit (eye socket). In P. hellenikorhinus the palpebral protruded upwards from the prefrontal, just above the orbit and slightly meeting the frontal, creating a small horn-like structure. The lacrimal was a near-rectangular bone located in front of the orbit, contributing to the shape of the latter. The scleral ring (structure that supports the eyeball), found inside the orbit, was circular in shape and formed by consecutive bony plates.

The snout was formed by the nasal, maxillar, premaxillar and rostral bones. The nasal was generally rounded but some individuals had a sharp nasal boss (a feature that has been called "nasal horn"). In P. hellenikorhinus this boss was divided in two sharp and long ridges. The maxilla was very deep and had up to 15 alveoli (tooth sockets) on its underside or teeth bearing surface. The premaxilla had two alveoli on its lower edge—a character that was present at least on P. andrewsi. The rostral bone was devoid of teeth, high and triangular in shape. It had a sharp end and rough texture, which reflects that a rhamphotheca (horny beak) was present. As a whole, the skull had four pairs of fenestrae (skull openings). The foremost hole, the nares (nostril opening), was oval-shaped and considerably smaller than the nostrils seen in ceratopsids. Protoceratops had large orbits, which measured around 5 cm (50 mm) in diameter and had irregular shapes depending on the individual. The forward facing and closely located orbits combined with a narrow snout, gave Protoceratops a well-developed binocular vision. Behind the eye was a slightly smaller fenestra known as the infratemporal fenestra, formed by the curves of the jugal and squamosal. The last openings of the skull were two parietal fenestrae (holes in the frill).

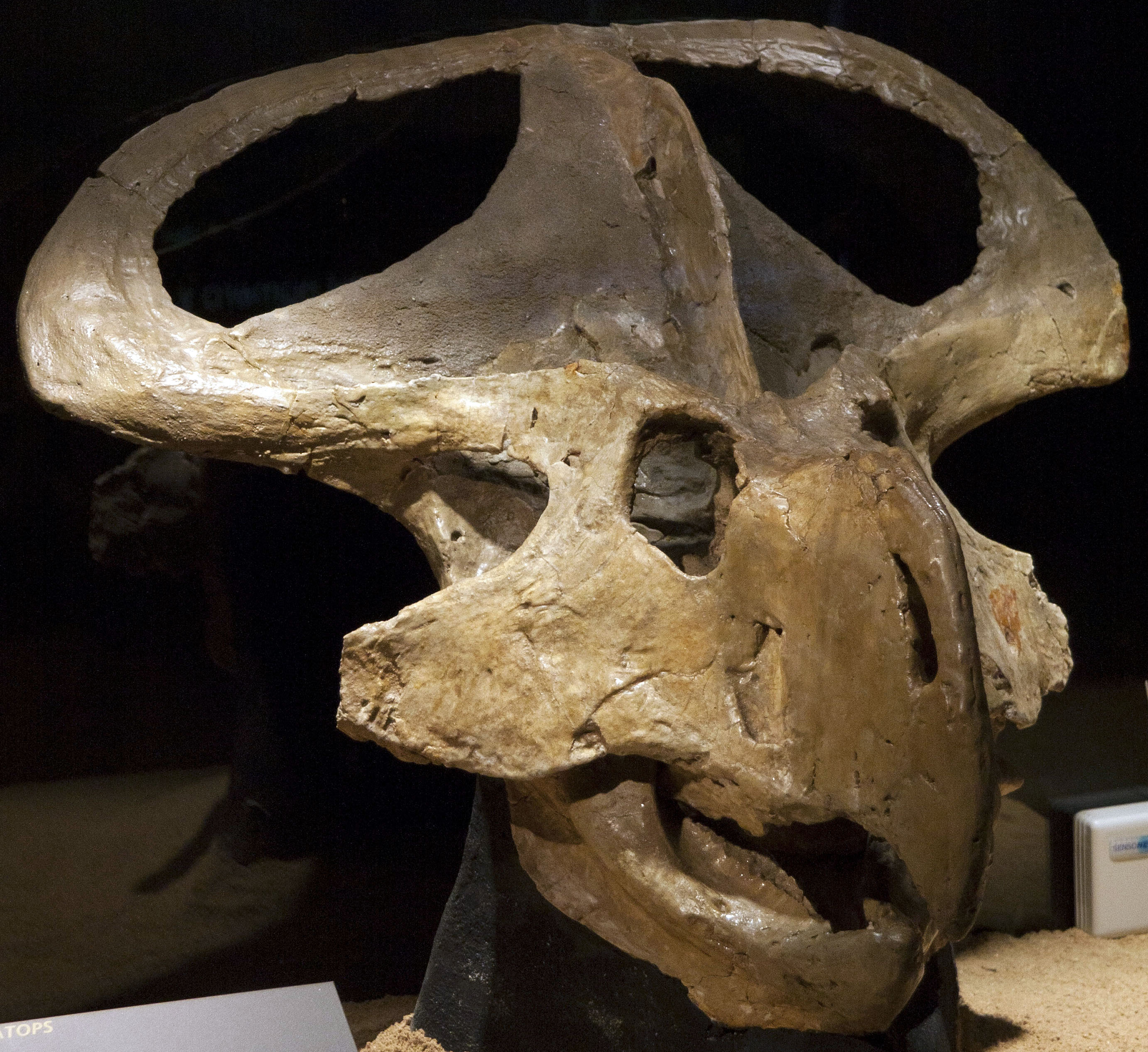
P. andrewsi skull

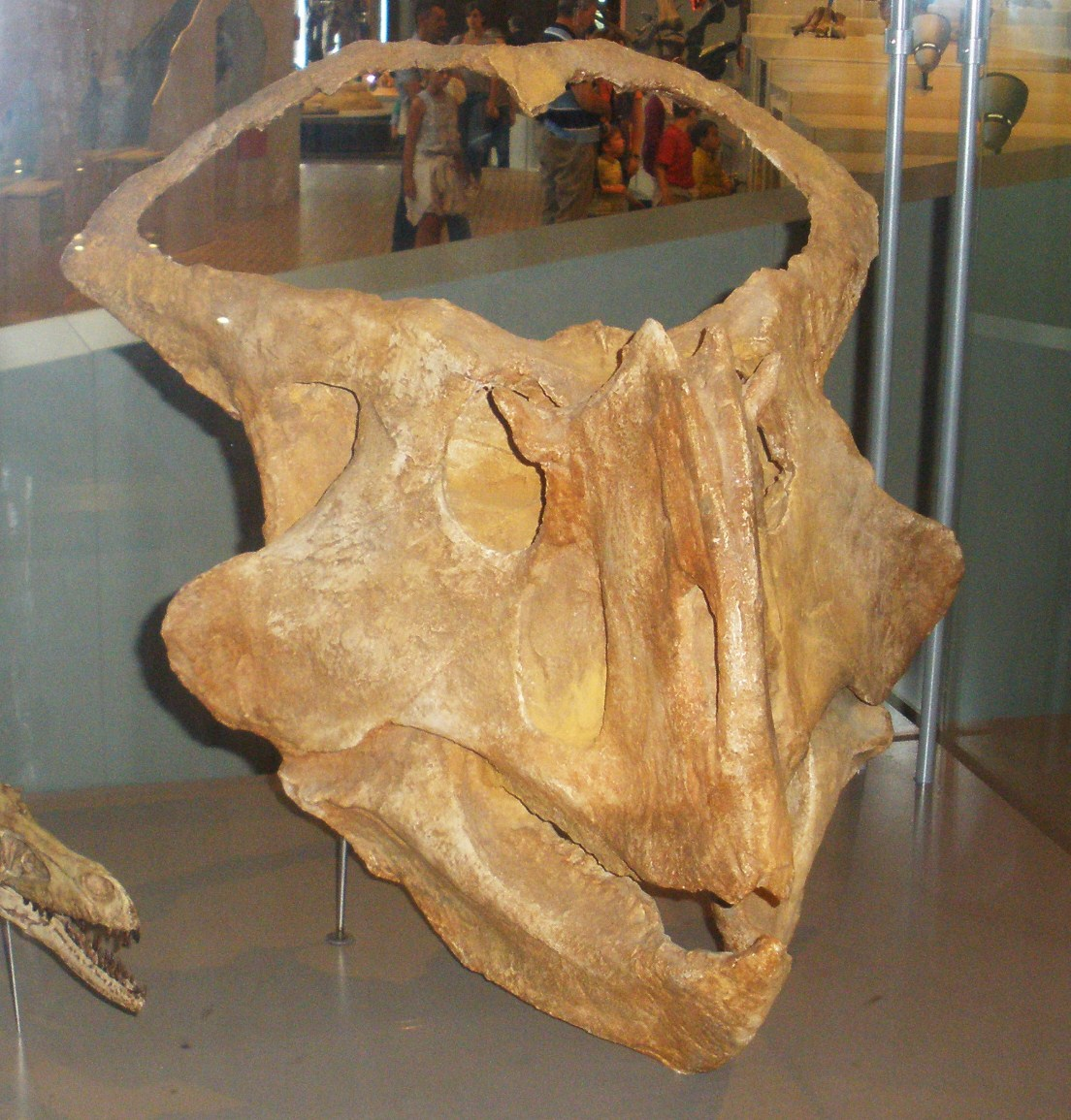
P. hellenikorhinus skull

The lower jaw of Protoceratops was a large element composed of the predentary, dentary, coronoid, angular and surangular. The predentary (frontmost bone) was very pointed and elongated, having a V-shaped symphyseal (bone union) region at the front. The dentary (teeth-bearing bone) was robust, deep, slightly recurved, and fused to the angular and surangular. A large and thick ridge ran along the lateral surface of the dentary that connected the coronoid process—a bony projection that extends upwards from the upper surface of the lower jaw behind the tooth row—and surangular. It bore up to 12–14 alveoli on its top margin. Both predentary and dentary had a series of foramina (small pits), the latter mostly on its anterior end. The coronoid (highest point of the lower jaw) was blunt-shaped and touched by the coronoid process of the dentary, being obscured by the jugal. The surangular was near triangular in shape and in old individuals it was coossified together with the coronoid process. The angular was located below the two latter bones and behind the dentary. It was a large and somewhat rounded bone that complemented the curvature of the dentary. On its inner surface it was attached to the articular. The articular was a smaller bone and had a concavity on its inner surface for the articulation with the quadrate.

Protoceratops had leaf-shaped dentary and maxillary teeth that bore several denticles (serrations) on their respective edges. The crowns (upper exposed part) had two faces or lobes that were divided by a central ridge-like structure (also called "primary ridge"). The teeth were packed into a single row that created a shearing surface. Both dentary and maxillary teeth presented marked homodonty—a dental condition where the teeth share a similar shape and size. P. andrewsi bore two small, peg to spike-like teeth that were located on the underside of each premaxilla. The second premaxillary tooth was larger than the first one. Unlike dentary and maxillary teeth, the premaxillary dentition was devoid of denticles, having a relatively smooth surface. All teeth had a single root (lower part inserted in the alveoli).

=== Postcranial skeleton ===
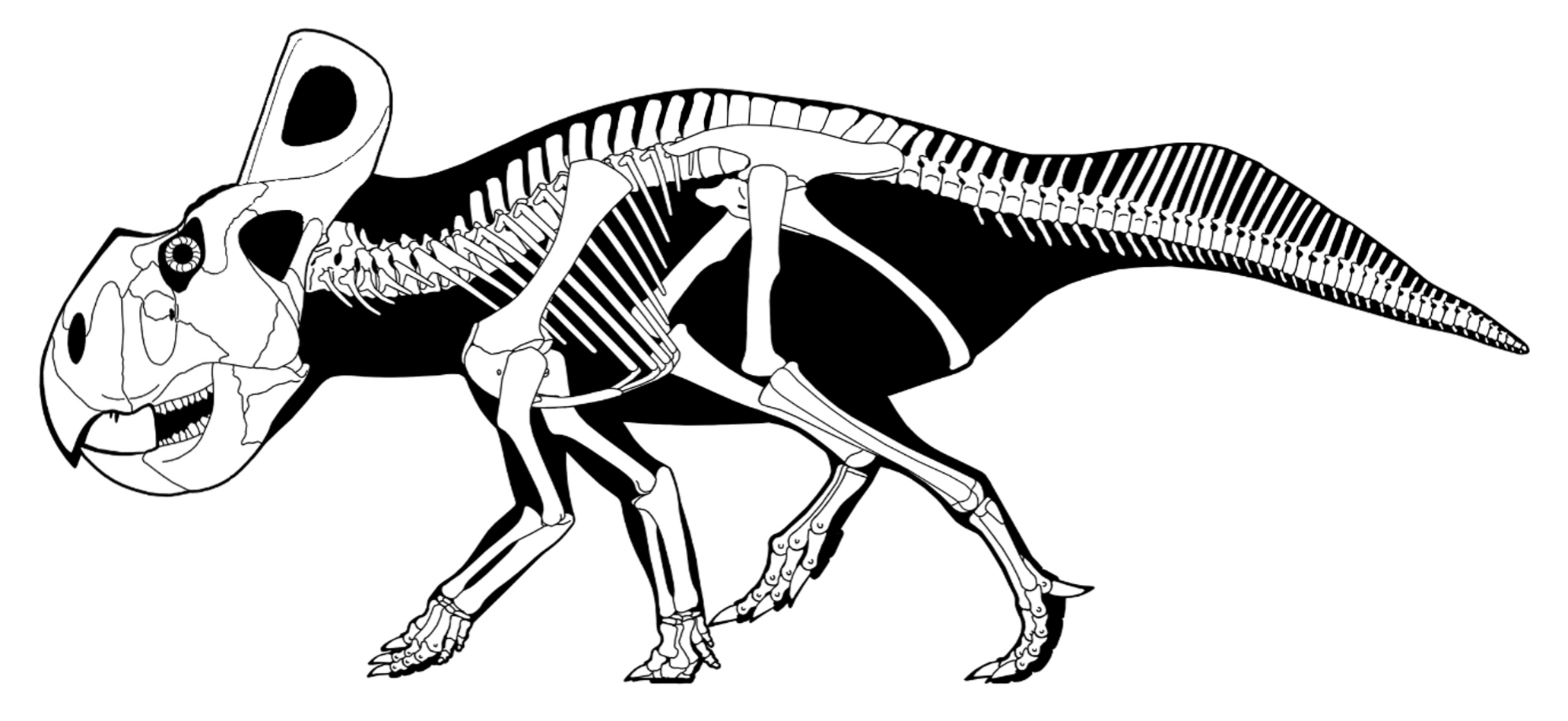
Skeletal reconstruction of P. andrewsi

The vertebral column of Protoceratops had nine cervical (neck), 12 dorsal (back), eight sacral (pelvic) and over 40 caudal (tail) vertebrae. The centra (centrum; body of the vertebrae) of the first three cervicals were coossified together (atlas, axis and third cervical respectively) creating a rigid structure. The neck was rather short and had poor flexibility. The atlas was the smallest cervical and consisted mainly of the centrum because the neural arch (upper, and pointy vertebral region) was a thin, narrow bar of bone that extended upwards and backward to the base of the axis neural spine. The capitular facet (attachment site for chevrons; also known as cervical ribs) was formed by a low projection located near the base of the neural arch. The anterior facet of the atlas centrum was highly concave for the articulation of the occipital condyle of the skull. The neural arch and spine of the axis were notably larger than the atlas itself and any other cervical. The axial neural spine was broad and backward developed being slightly connected to that of the third cervical. From the fourth to the ninth all cervicals were relatively equal in size and proportions. Their neural spines were smaller than the first three vertebrae and the development of the capitular facet diminished from the fourth cervical onwards.

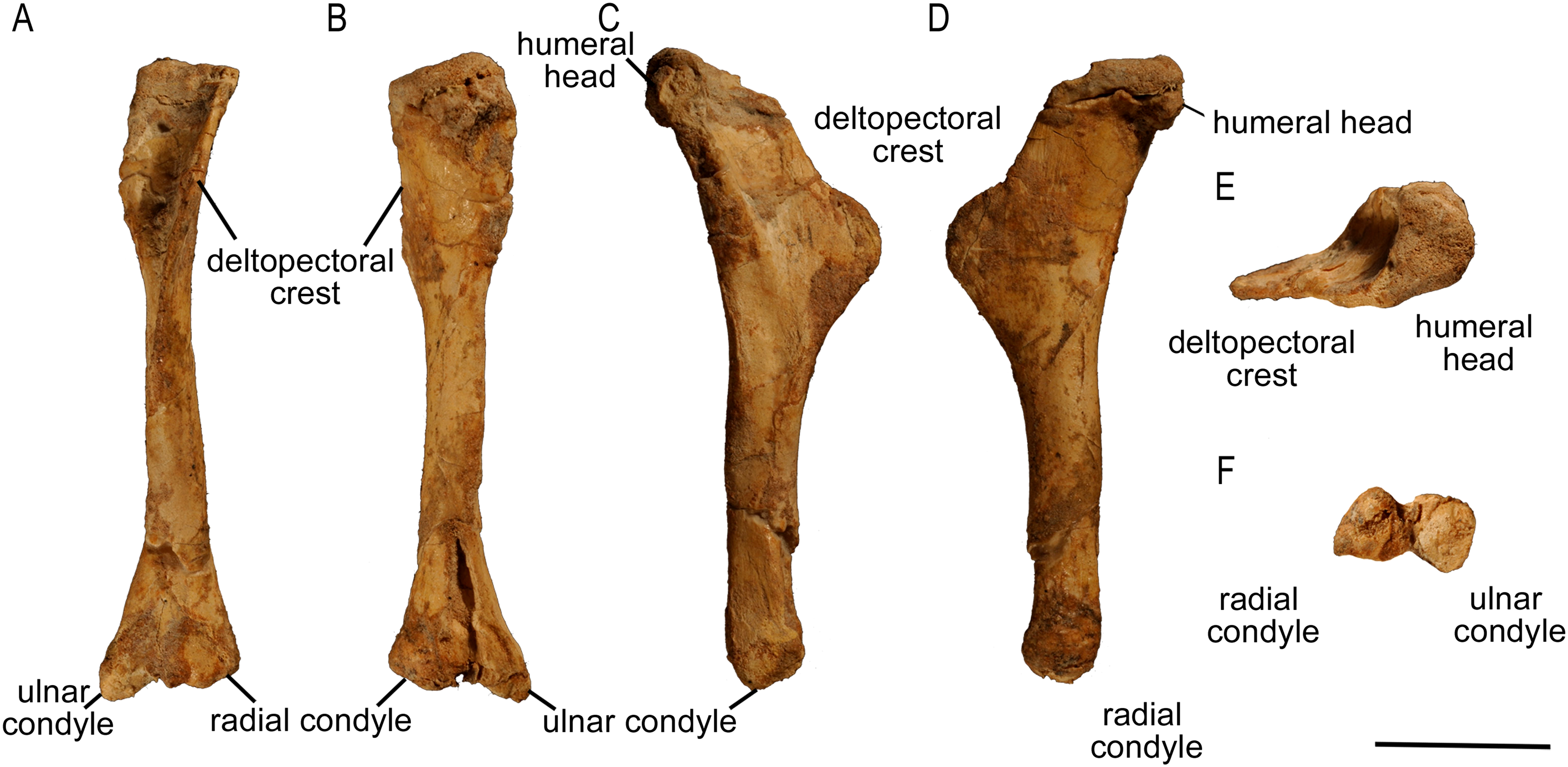
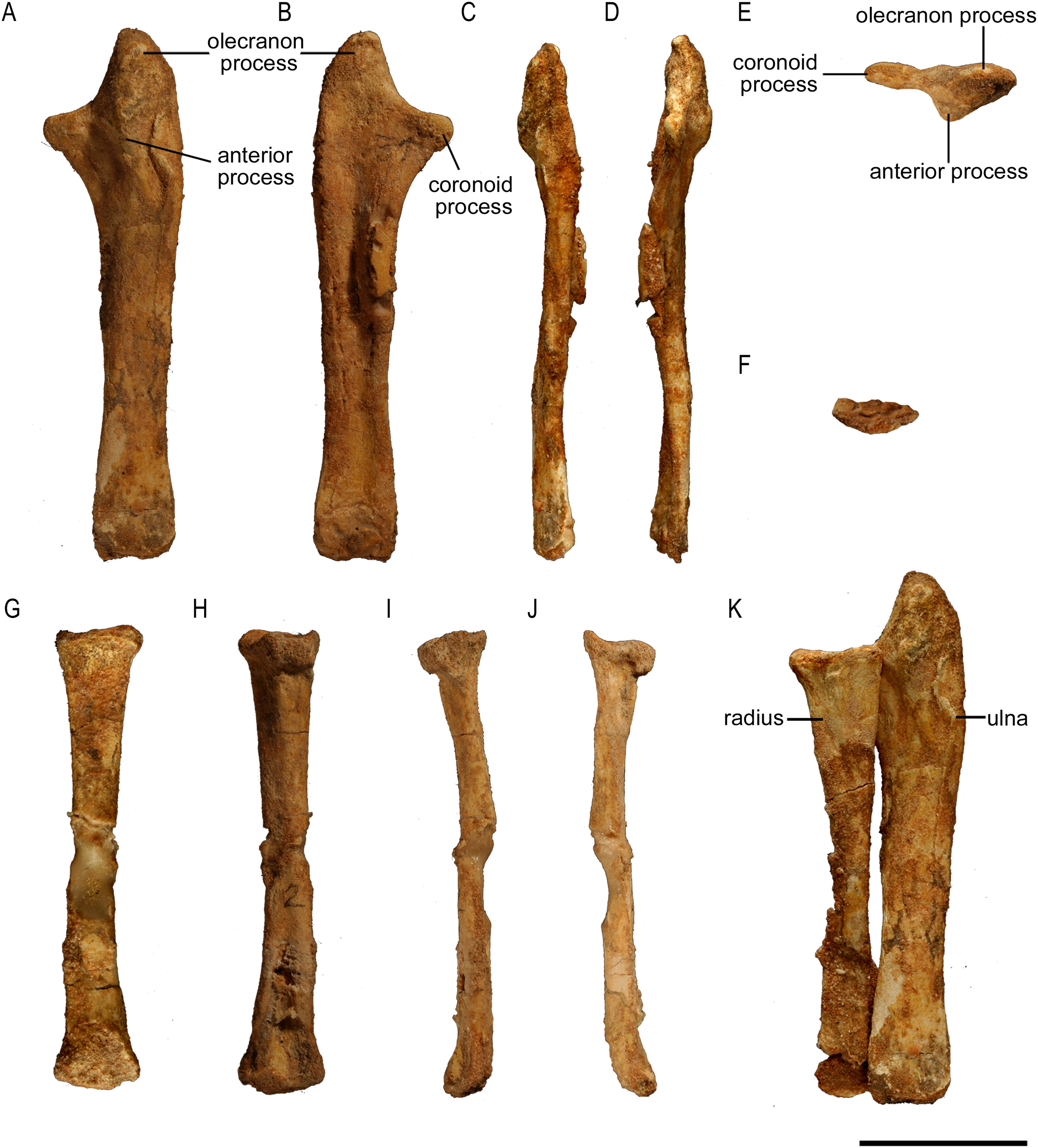
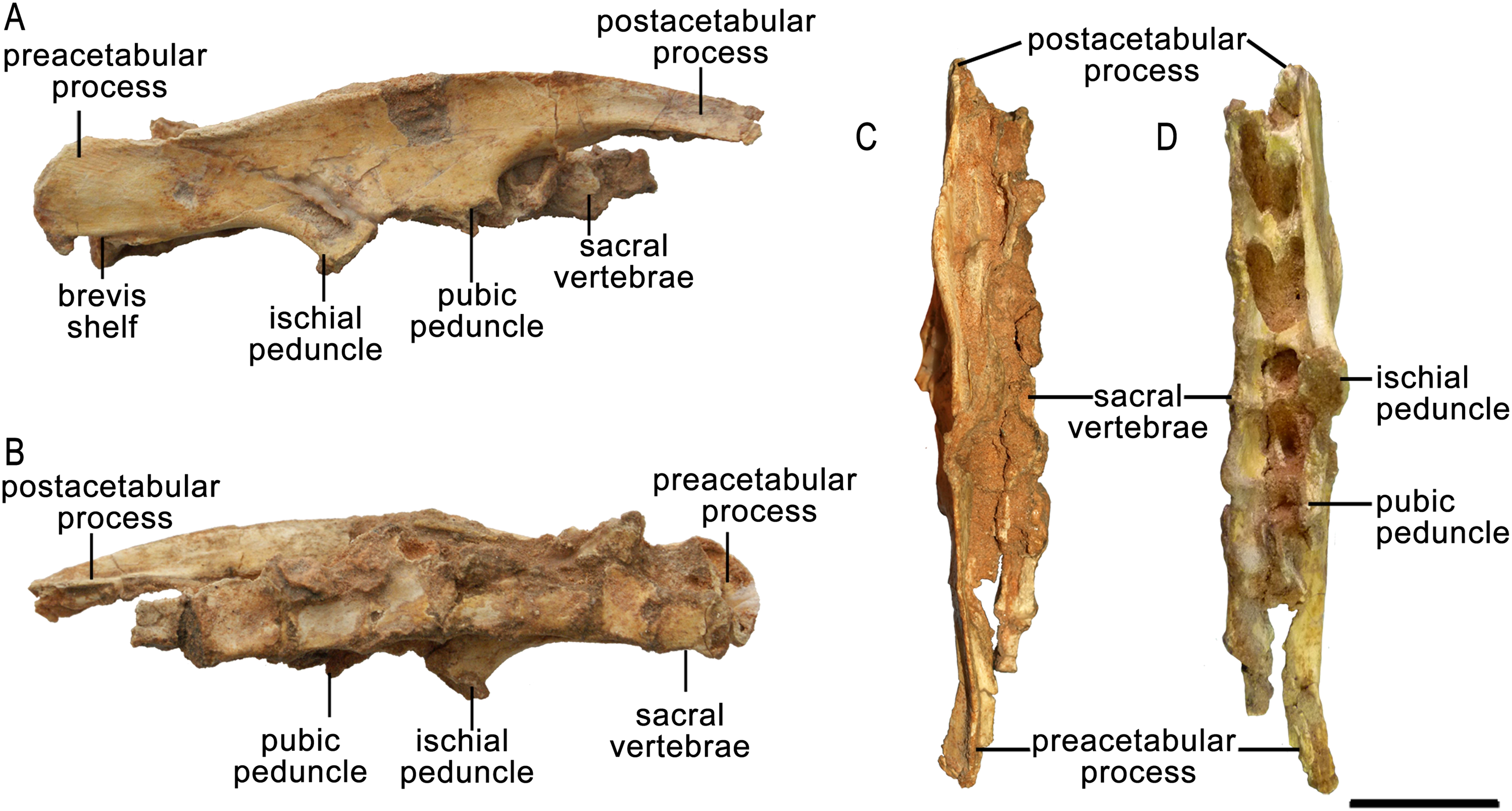
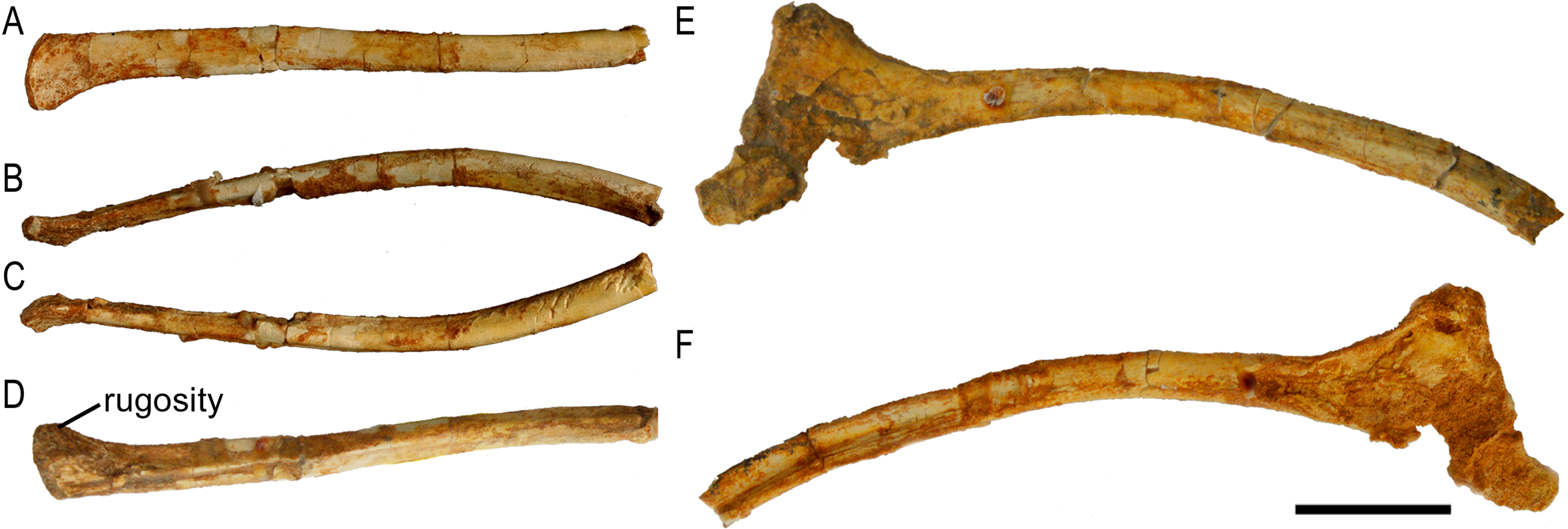
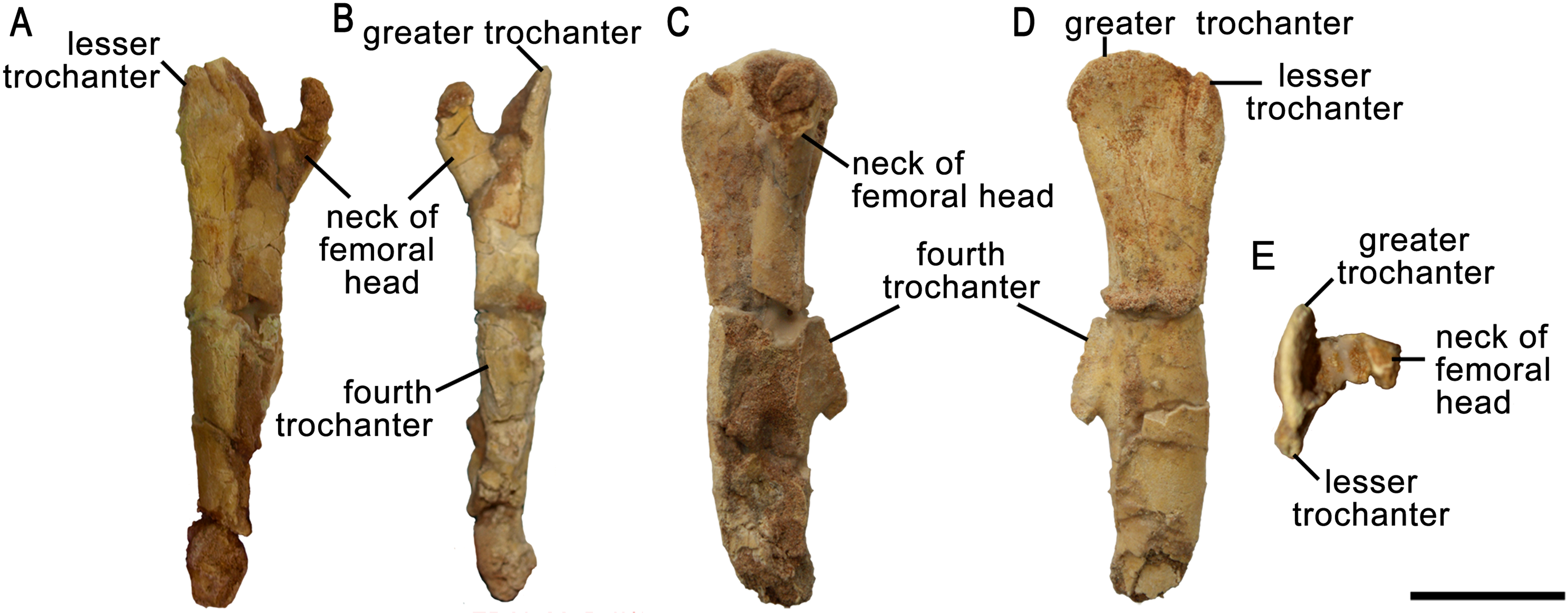
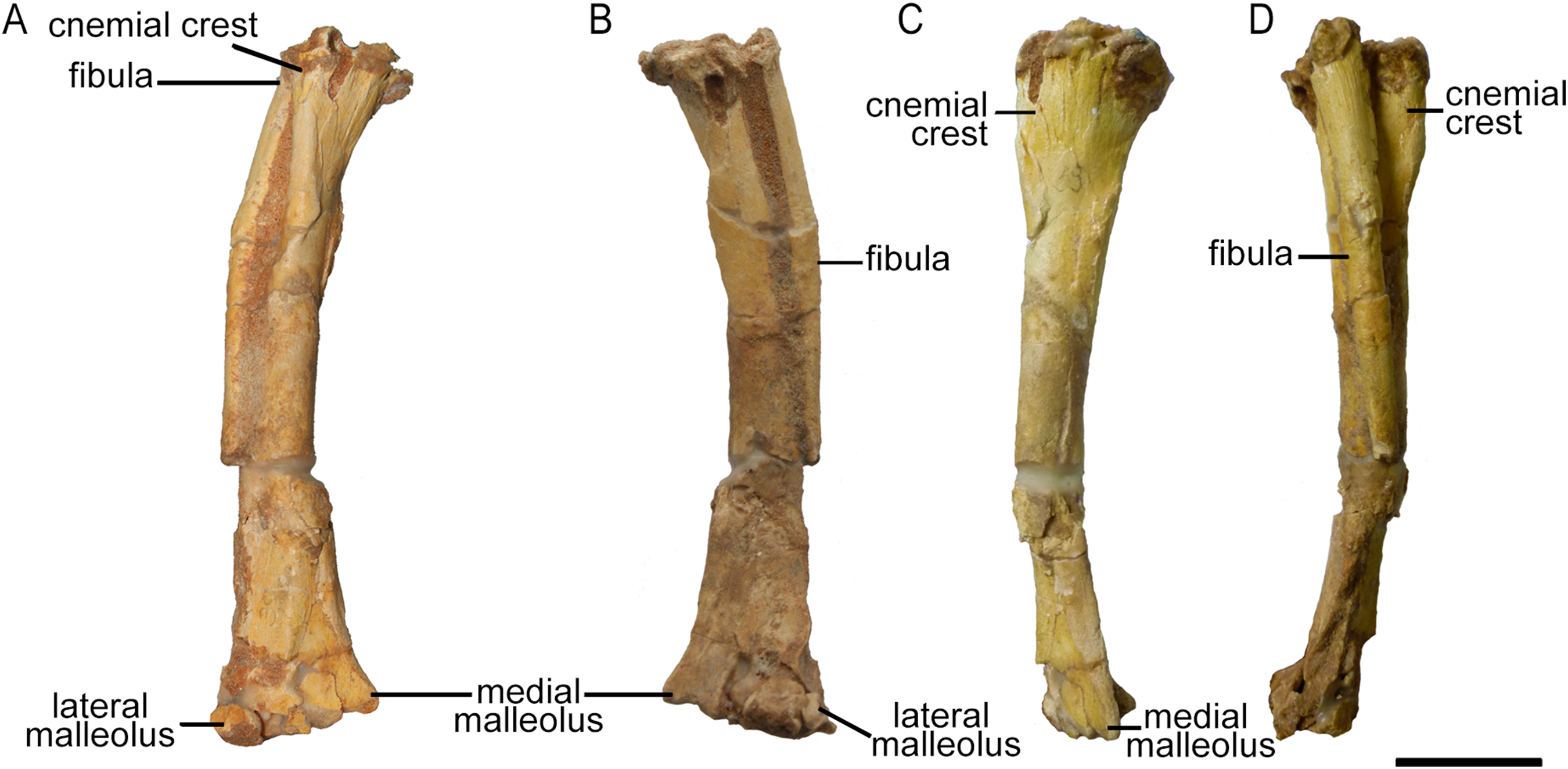
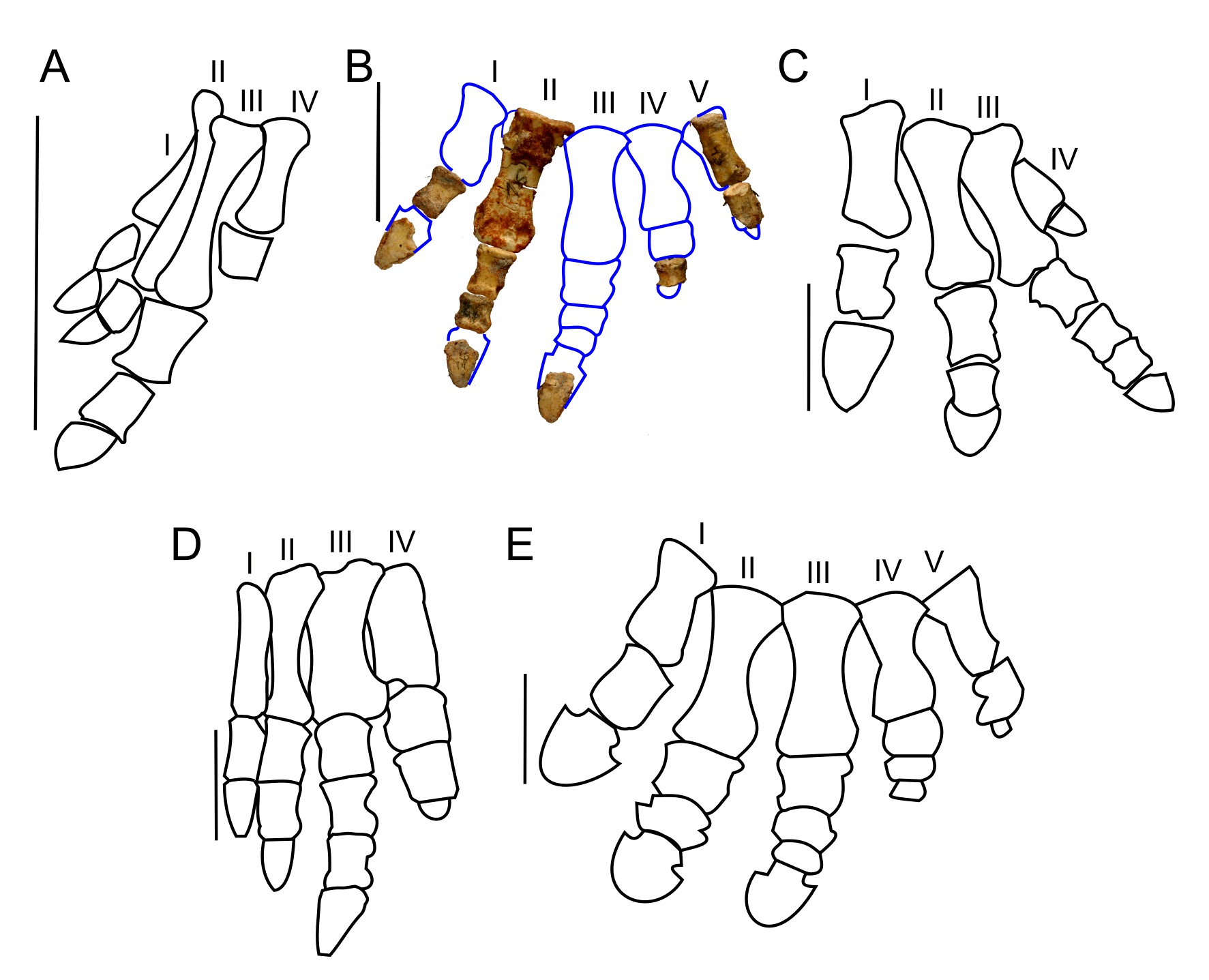
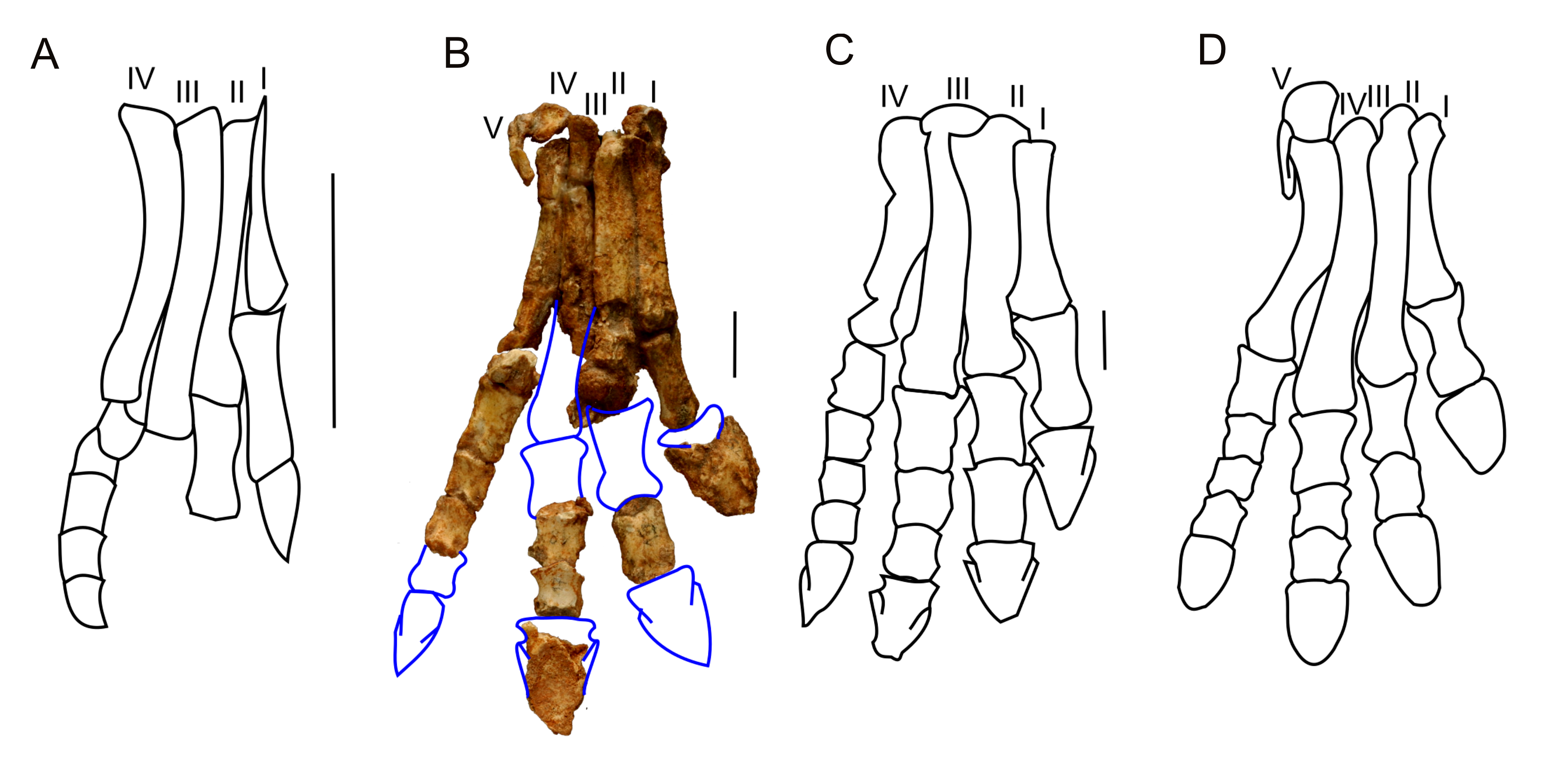
Forelimb (top), pelvic (middle), and hindlimb fossil bones (bottom) of specimen ZPAL Mg D-II/3

The dorsal vertebrae were similar in shape and size. Their neural spines were elongated and sub-rectangular in shape with a tendency to become more elongated in posterior vertebrae. The centra were large and predominantly amphiplatian (flat on both facets) and circular when seen from the front. Sometimes in old individuals the last dorsal vertebra was somewhat coosified to the first sacral. The sacral vertebrae were firmly coosified giving form to the sacrum, which was connected to the inner sides of both ilia. Their neural spines were broad, not coosified, and rather consistent in length. The centra were mainly opisthocoelous (concave on the posterior facet and convex on the anterior one) and their size became smaller towards the end. The caudal vertebrae decreased in size progressively towards the end and had very elongated neural spines in the mid-series, forming a sail-like structure. This elongation started from the first to the fourteenth caudal. The centra were heterocoelous (saddle-shaped at both facets). On the anterior caudals they were broad, however, from the twenty-fifth onwards the centra became elongated alongside the neural spines. On the underside of the caudal vertebrae a series of chevrons were attached, giving form to the lower part of the tail. The first chevron was located at the union of the third and fourth caudals. Chevrons three to nine were the largest and from the tenth onwards they became smaller.

All vertebrae of Protoceratops had ribs attached on the lateral sides, except for the series of caudals. The first five cervical ribs (sometimes called chevrons) were some of the shortest ribs, and among them the first two were longer than the rest. The third to the sixth dorsal (thoracic) ribs were the longest ribs in the skeleton of Protoceratops, the following ribs became smaller in size as they progressed toward the end of the vertebral column. The two last dorsal ribs were the smallest, and the last of them was in contact with the internal surfaces of the ilium. Most of the sacral ribs were fused into the sacrum, and had a rather curved shape.

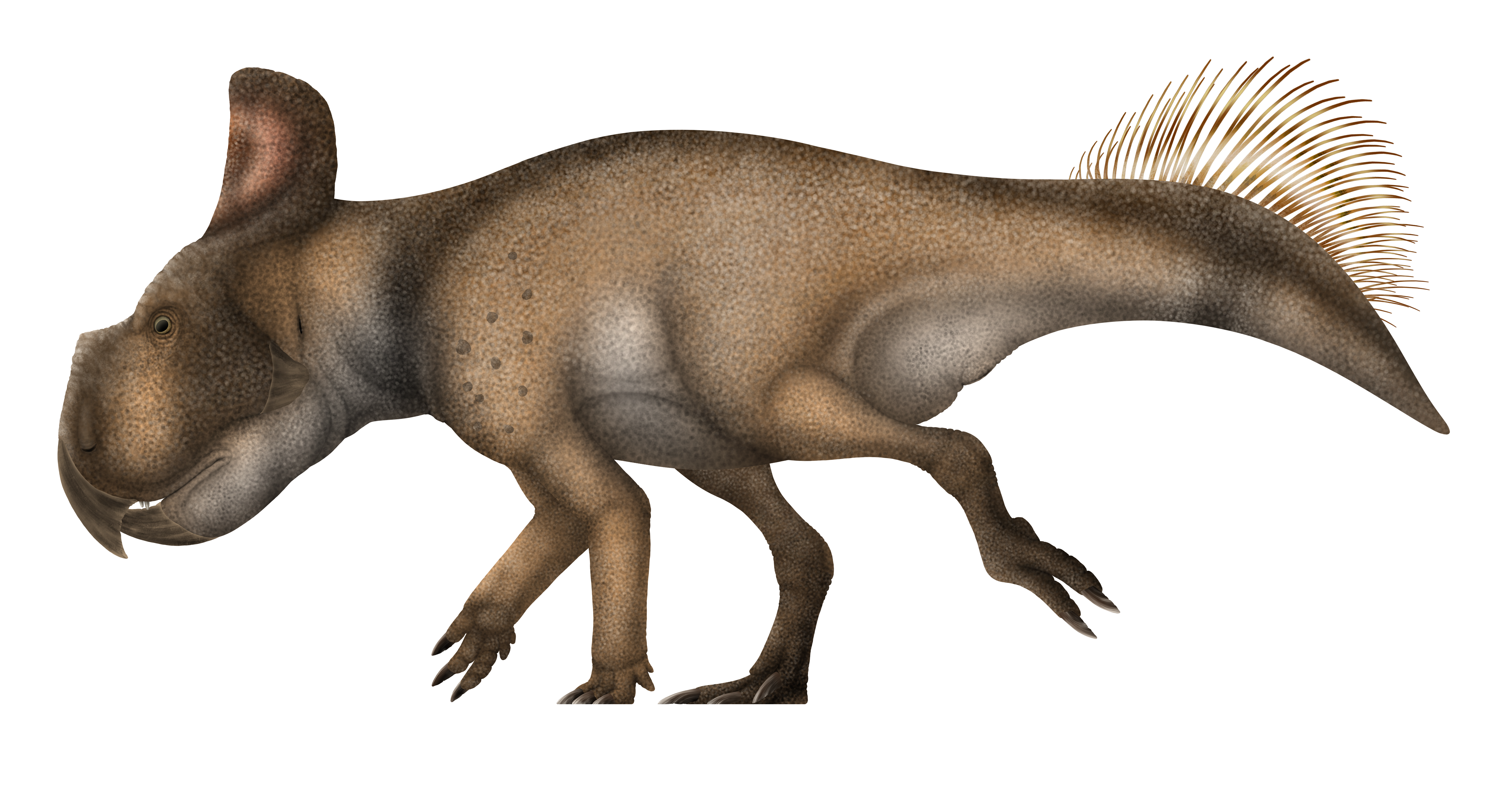
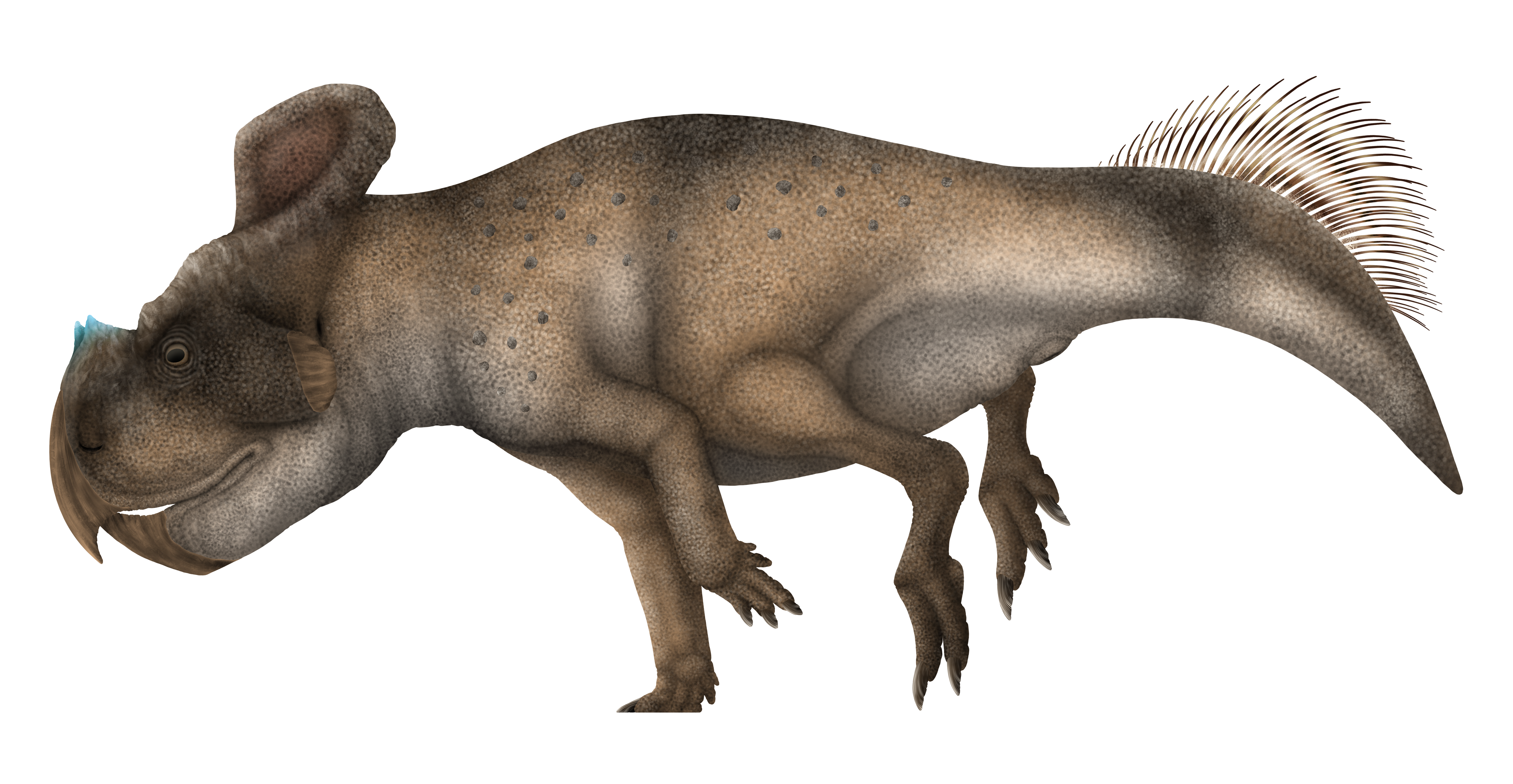
Life restorations of P. andrewsi (top) and P. hellenikorhinus (bottom)

The pectoral girdle of Protoceratops was formed by the scapulocoracoid (fusion of the coracoid and scapula) and clavicle. The scapulae (shoulder blades) were relatively large and rounded on their inner sides. At their upper region, the scapulae were wide. At their lower region, the scapulae meet the coracoids. The coracoids were relatively elliptical, and sometimes coosified (fused) to the scapulae. The clavicle of Protoceratops was an U to slightly V-shaped element that joined to the upper border of the scapulocoracoid. In its general form, the forelimbs of Protoceratops were shorted than the hindlimbs, and composed by the humerus, radius, and ulna. The humerus (upper arm bone) was large and slender, and at the lower part it met with both radius and ulna. The ulna had a slightly recurved shape and was longer than the radius. A concavity was present on its upper part, serving as the connection with the humerus and forming the elbow. The radius was a rather short bone with a straight shape. The manus (hand) of Protoceratops had five digits (fingers). The first three fingers had unguals (claw bones) and were the largest digits. The last two were devoid of unguals and had a small size, mostly vestigial (retained, but without important function). Both hand and feet unguals were flat, blunt and hoof-like.

The pelvic girdle was formed by the ilium, pubis, and ischium. The ilium was a large element, having a narrow preacetabular process (anterior end) and a wide postacetabular process (posterior end). The pubis was the smallest element of the pelvic girdle and it had an irregular shape, although its lower end was developed into a pointed bony projection downward. The ischium was the longest bone of the pelvic girdle. It had an elongated shaft with a somewhat wide lower end. The hindlimbs of Protoceratops were rather long, with a slighter longer tibia (lower leg bone) than femur (thigh bone). The femur (thighbone) was robust and had a rather rounded and pronounced greater trochanter, which was slightly recurved into the inner sides. The tibia (shinbone) was long and slender with a wide lower end. On its upper region a concavity was developed for the joint with the smaller fibula. The pes (foot) were composed of four metatarsal and four toes which bore shovel-like pedal unguals. The first metatarsal and toe were the smallest, while the other elements were of similar shape and length.

== Classification ==
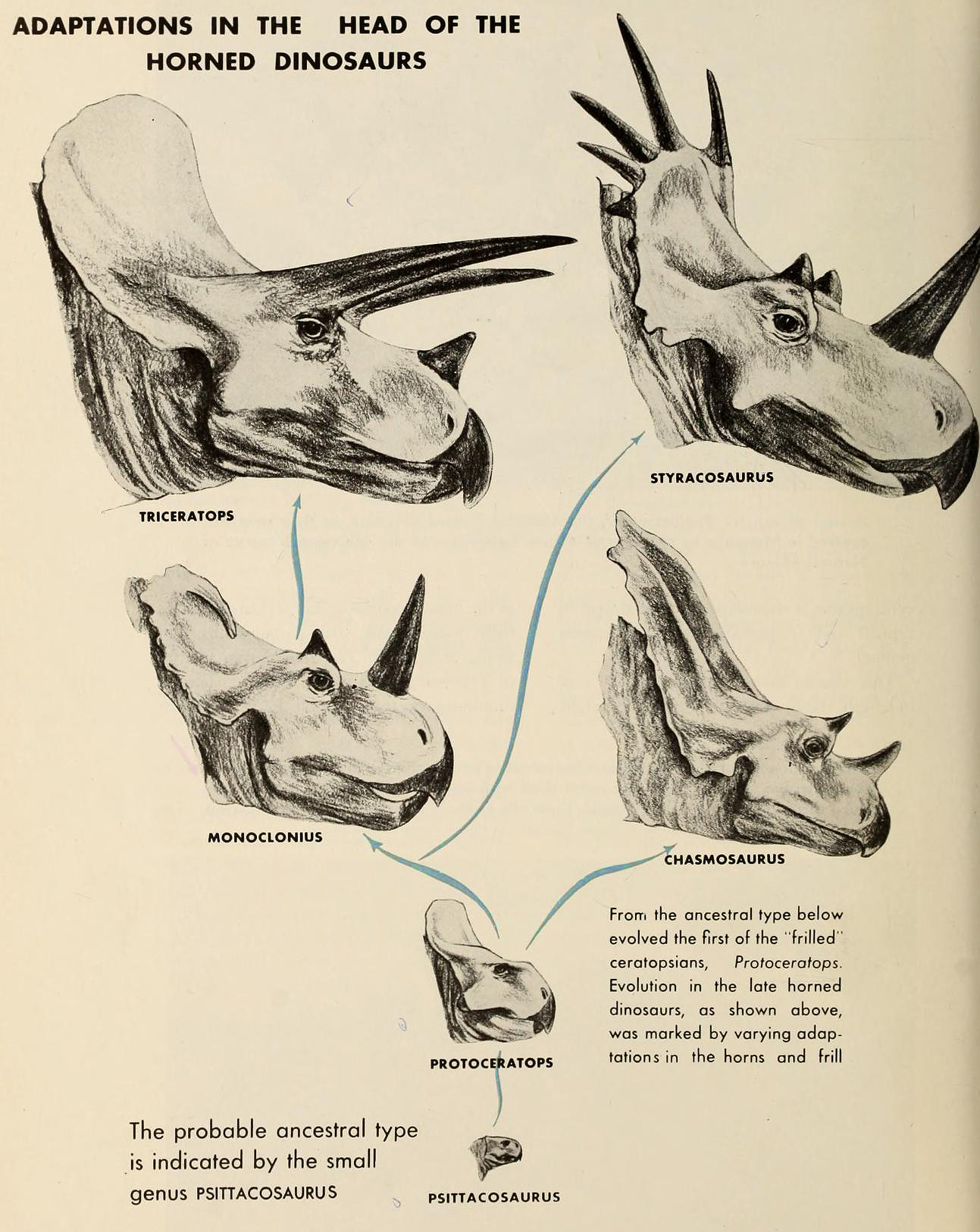
Early interpretation of the evolutionary relationships of Protoceratops with ceratopsids upon its discovery; a notion now obsolete

Protoceratops was in 1923 placed within the newly named family Protoceratopsidae as the representative species by Granger and Gregory. This family was characterized by their overall primitive morphology in comparison to the more derived Ceratopsidae, such as lack of well-developed horn cores and relative smaller body size. Protoceratops itself was considered by the authors to be somehow related to ankylosaurians based on skull traits, with a more intensified degree to Triceratops and relatives. Gregory and Charles C. Mook in 1925 upon a more deeper analysis of Protoceratops and its overall morphology, concluded that this taxon represents a ceratopsian more primitive than ceratopsids and not an ankylosaur-ceratopsian ancestor. In 1951 Edwin H. Colbert considered Protoceratops to represent a key ancestor for the ceratopsid lineage, suggesting that it ultimately led to the evolution of large-bodied ceratopsians such as Styracosaurus and Triceratops. Such lineage was suggested to have started from the primitive ceratopsian Psittacosaurus. He also regarded Protoceratops as one of the first "frilled" ceratopsians to appear in the fossil record.

However, in 1975 Maryanska and Osmolska argued that it is very unlikely that protoceratopsids evolved from psittacosaurids, and also unlikely that they gave rise to the highly derived (advanced) ceratopsids. The first point was supported by the numerous anatomical differences between protoceratopsids and psittacosaurids, most notably the extreme reduction of some hand digits in the latter group—a trait much less pronounced in protoceratopsids. The second point was explained on the basis of the already derived anatomy in protoceratopsids like Bagaceratops or Protoceratops (such as the jaw morphology). Maryanska and Osmolska also emphasized that some early members of the Ceratopsidae reflect a much older evolutionary history. In 1998, paleontologist Paul Sereno formally defined Protoceratopsidae as the branch-based clade including all coronosaurs closer to Protoceratops than to Triceratops.

Furthermore, with the re-examinations of Turanoceratops in 2009 and Zuniceratops—two critical ceratopsian taxa regarding the evolutionary history of ceratopsids—in 2010 it was concluded that the origin of ceratopsids is unrelated to, and older than the fossil record of Protoceratops and relatives. In most recent/modern phylogenetic analyses Protoceratops and Bagaceratops are commonly recovered as sister taxa, leaving the interpretations proposing direct relationships with more derived ceratopsians unsupported.

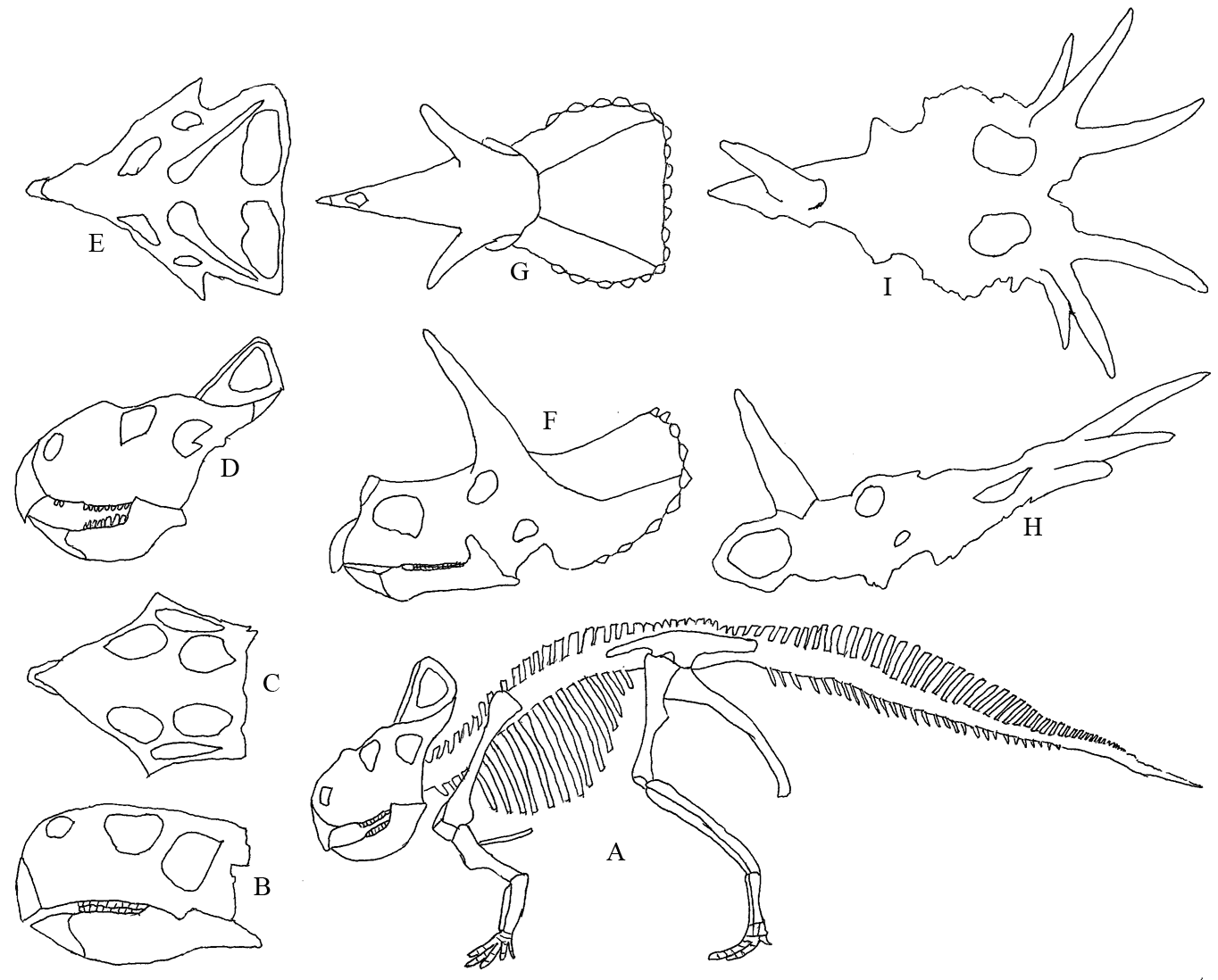
Protoceratops (A, D, E) compared to other ceratopsians

In 2019 Czepiński analyzed a vast majority of referred specimens to the ceratopsians Bagaceratops and Breviceratops, and concluded that most were in fact specimens of the former. Although the genera Gobiceratops, Lamaceratops, Magnirostris, and Platyceratops, were long considered valid and distinct taxa, and sometimes placed within Protoceratopsidae, Czepiński found the diagnostic (identifier) features used to distinguish these taxa to be largely present in Bagaceratops and thus becoming synonyms of this genus. Under this reasoning, Protoceratopsidae consists of Bagaceratops, Breviceratops, and Protoceratops. Below are the proposed relationships among Protoceratopsidae by Czepiński:

- Protoceratopsidae
  - - Protoceratops andrewsi
    - - Protoceratops hellenikorhinus
      - - Breviceratops
        - - Bagaceratops

In 2019 Bitnara Kim and colleagues described a relatively well-preserved Bagaceratops skeleton from the Barun Goyot Formation, noting numerous similarities with Protoceratops. Even though their respective skull anatomy had substantial differences, their postcranial skeleton was virtually the same. The phylogenetic analysis performed by the team recovered both protoceratopsids as sister taxa, indicating that Bagaceratops and Protoceratops were anatomically and systematically related. Below is the obtained cladogram, showing the position of Protoceratops and Bagaceratops:

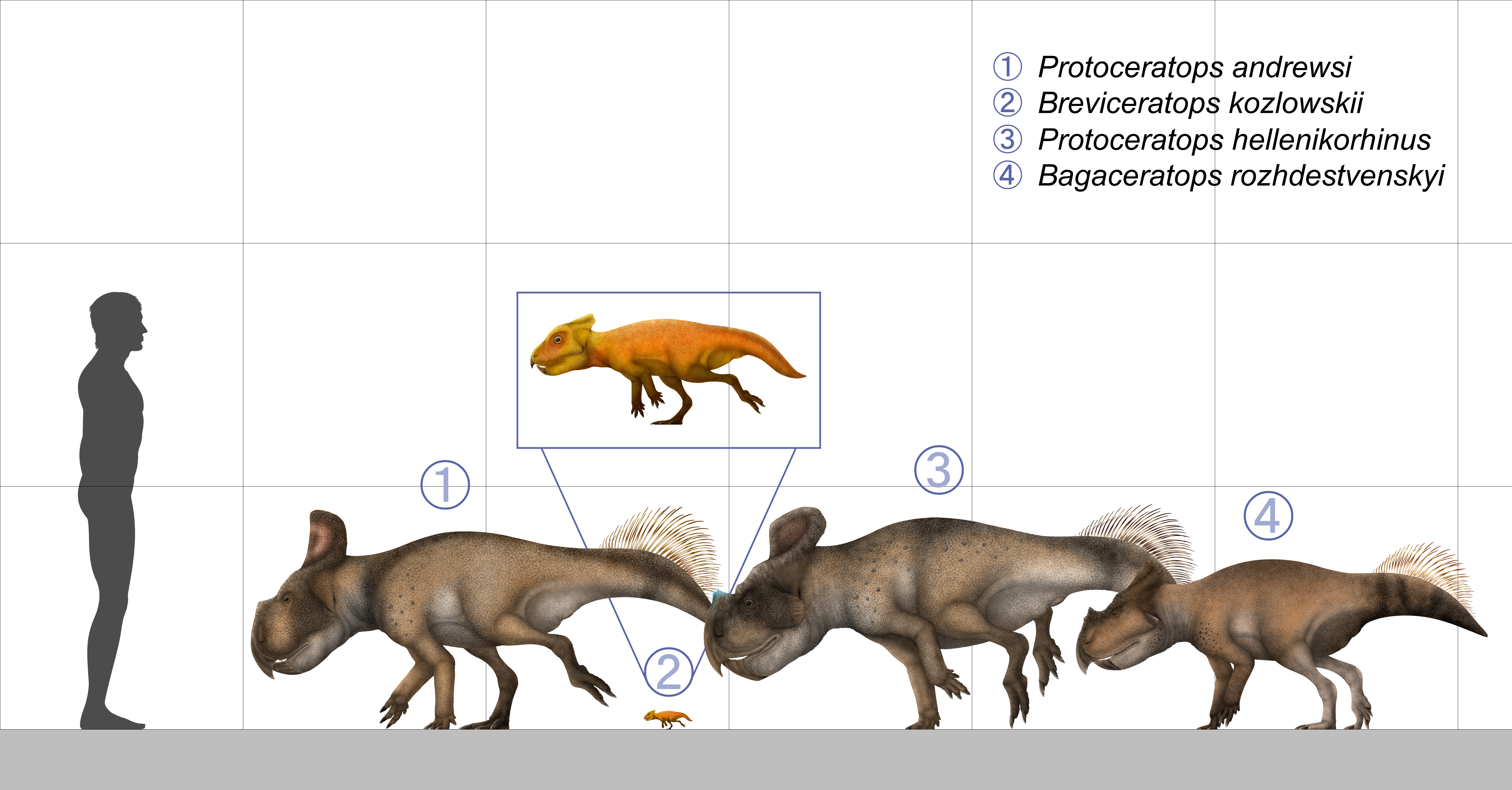
Size of Protoceratops (1, 3) compared with other protoceratopsids

- Coronosauria
  - - Graciliceratops
    - - Protoceratopsidae
        - Bagaceratops
        - Protoceratops
      - - Zuniceratops
        - - Turanoceratops
          - - Ceratopsidae
  - - Leptoceratopsidae

=== Evolution ===
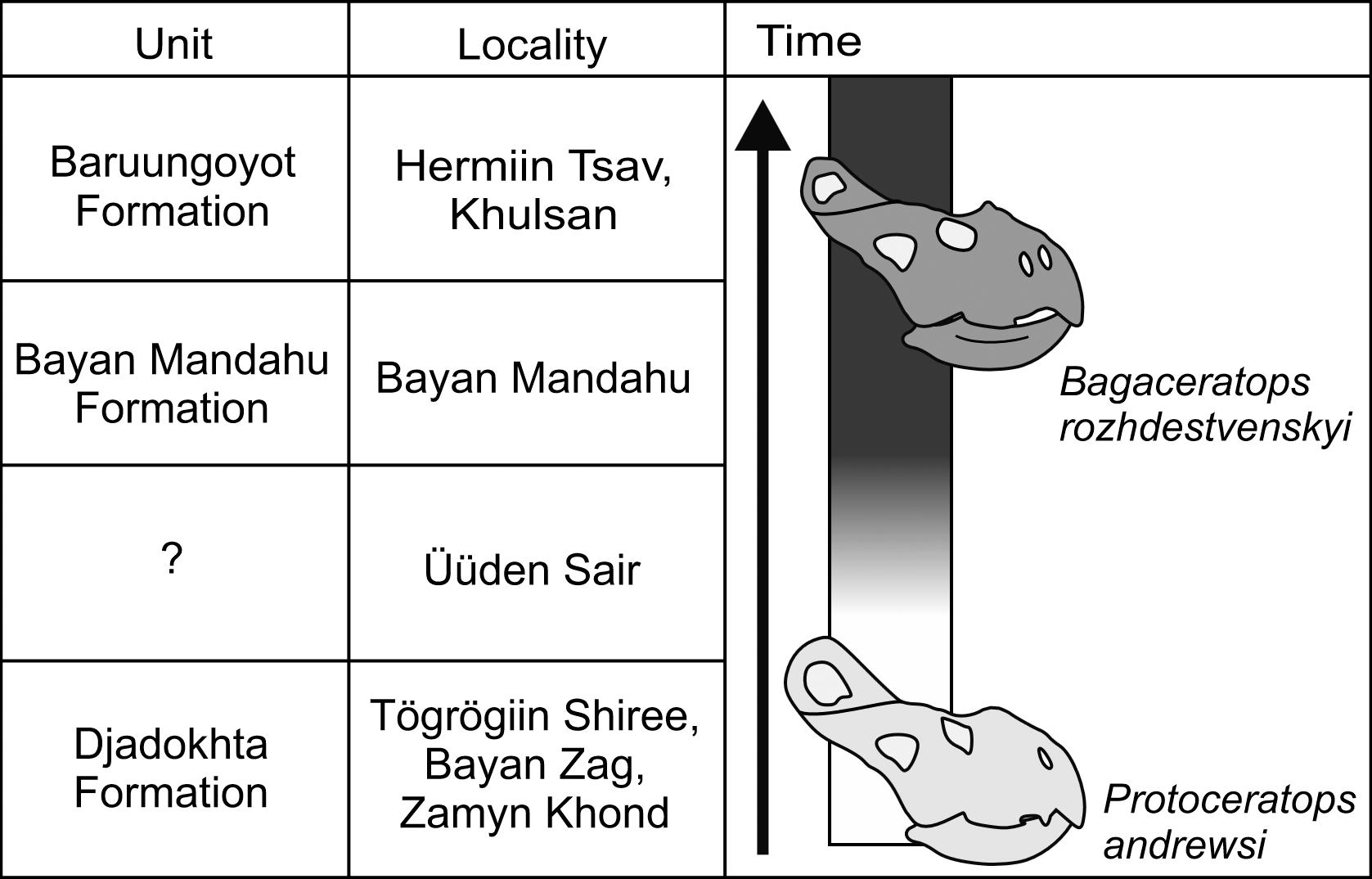
Hypothesized transition from P. andrewsi to B. rozhdestvenskyi

Longrich and team in 2010 indicated that highly derived morphology of P. hellenikorhinus—when compared to P. andrewsi—indicates that this species may represent a lineage of Protoceratops that had a longer evolutionary history compared to P. andrewsi, or simply a direct descendant of P. andrewsi. The difference in morphologies between Protoceratops also suggests that the nearby Bayan Mandahu Formation is slightly younger than the Djadokhta Formation.

In 2020, Czepiński analyzed several long-undescribed protoceratopsid specimens from the Udyn Sayr and Zamyn Khondt localities of the Djadokhta Formation. One specimen (MPC-D 100/551B) was shown to present skull traits that are intermediate between Bagaceratops rozhdestvenskyi (which is native to adjacent Bayan Mandahu and Barun Goyot) and P. andrewsi. The specimen hails from the Udyn Sayr locality, where Protoceratops remains are dominant, and given the lack of more conclusive anatomical traits, Czepiński assigned the specimen as Bagaceratops sp. He explained that the presence of this Bagaceratops specimen in such unusual locality could be solved by: (1) the coexistence and sympatric (altogether) evolution of both Bagaceratops and Protoceratops at this one locality; (2) the rise of B. rozhdestvenskyi in a different region and eventual migration to Udyn Sayr; (3) hybridization between the two protoceratopsids given the near placement of both Bayan Mandahu and Djadokhta; (4) anagenetic (progressive evolution) evolutionary transition from P. andrewsi to B. rozhdestvenskyi. Among scenarios, an anagenetic transition was best supported by Czepiński given the fact that no definitive B. rozhdestvenskyi fossils are found in Udyn Sayr, as expected from a hybridization event; MPC-D 100/551B lacks a well-developed accessory antorbital fenestra (hole behind the nostril openings), a trait expected to be present if B. rozhdestvenskyi had migrated to the area; and many specimens of P. andrewsi recovered at Udyn Sayr already feature a decrease in the presence of primitive premaxillary teeth, hence supporting a growing change in the populations.

== Paleobiology ==
=== Feeding ===
In 1955, paleontologist Georg Haas examined the overall skull shape of Protoceratops and attempted to reconstruct its jaw musculature. He suggested that the large neck frill was likely an attachment site for masticatory muscles. Such placement of the muscles may have helped to anchor the lower jaws, useful for feeding. Yannicke Dauphin and colleagues in 1988 described the enamel microstructure of Protoceratops, observing a non-prismatic outer layer. They concluded that enamel shape does not relate to the diet or function of the teeth as most animals do not necessarily use teeth to process food. The maxillary teeth of ceratopsians were usually packed into a dental battery that formed vertical shearing blades which probably chopped the leaves. This feeding method was likely more efficient in protoceratopsids as the enamel surface of Protoceratops was coarsely-textured and the tips of the micro-serrations developed on the basis of the teeth, probably helping to crumble vegetation. Based on their respective peg-like shape and reduced microornamentation, Dauphin and colleagues suggested that the premaxillary teeth of Protoceratops had no specific function.

In 1991, the paleontologist Gregory S. Paul stated that contrary to the popular view of ornithischians as obligate herbivores, some groups may have been opportunistic meat-eaters, including the members of Ceratopsidae and Protoceratopsidae. He pointed out that their prominent parrot-like beaks and shearing teeth along with powerful muscles on the jaws suggest an omnivore diet instead, much like pigs, hogs, boars and entelodonts. Such scenario indicates a possible competition with the more predatory theropods over carcasses, however, as the animal tissue ingestion was occasional and not the bulk of their diet, the energy flow in ecosystems was relatively simple. You Hailu and Peter Dodson in 2004 suggested that the premaxillary teeth of Protoceratops may have been useful for selective cropping and feeding.

In 2009, Kyo Tanque and team suggested that basal ceratopsians, such as protoceratopsids, were most likely low browsers due to their relatively small body size. This low-browsing method would have allowed to feed on foliage and fruits within range, and large basal ceratopsians may have consumed tougher seeds or plant material not available to smaller basal ceratopsians.

David J. Button and Lindsay E. Zanno in 2019 performed a large phylogenetic analysis based on skull biomechanical characters—provided by 160 Mesozoic dinosaur species—to analyze the multiple emergences of herbivory among non-avian dinosaurs. Their results found that herbivorous dinosaurs mainly followed two distinct modes of feeding, either processing food in the gut—characterized by relatively gracile skulls and low bite forces—or the mouth, which was characterized by features associated with extensive processing such as high bite forces and robust jaw musculature. Ceratopsians (including protoceratopsids), along with Euoplocephalus, Hungarosaurus, parkosaurid, ornithopod and heterodontosaurine dinosaurs, were found to be in the former category, indicating that Protoceratops and relatives had strong bite forces and relied mostly on its jaws to process food.

=== Ontogeny ===
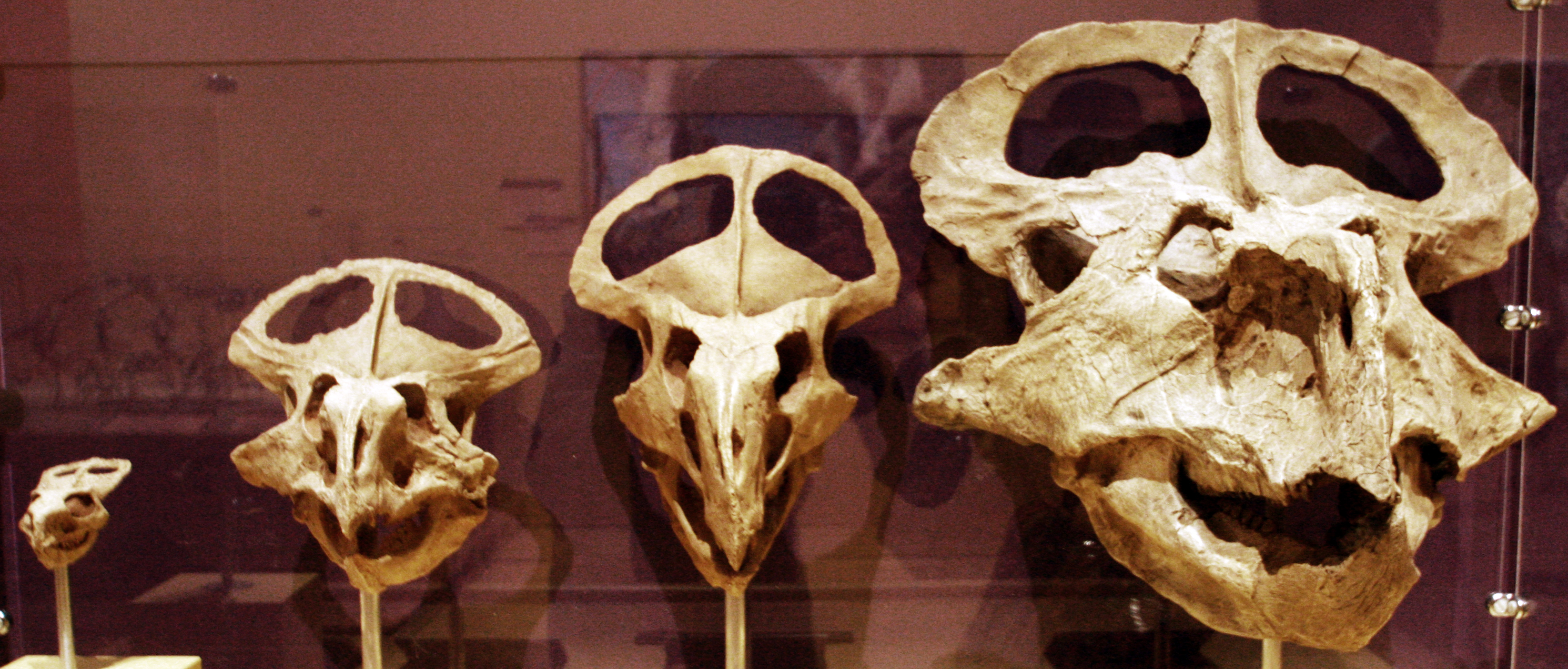
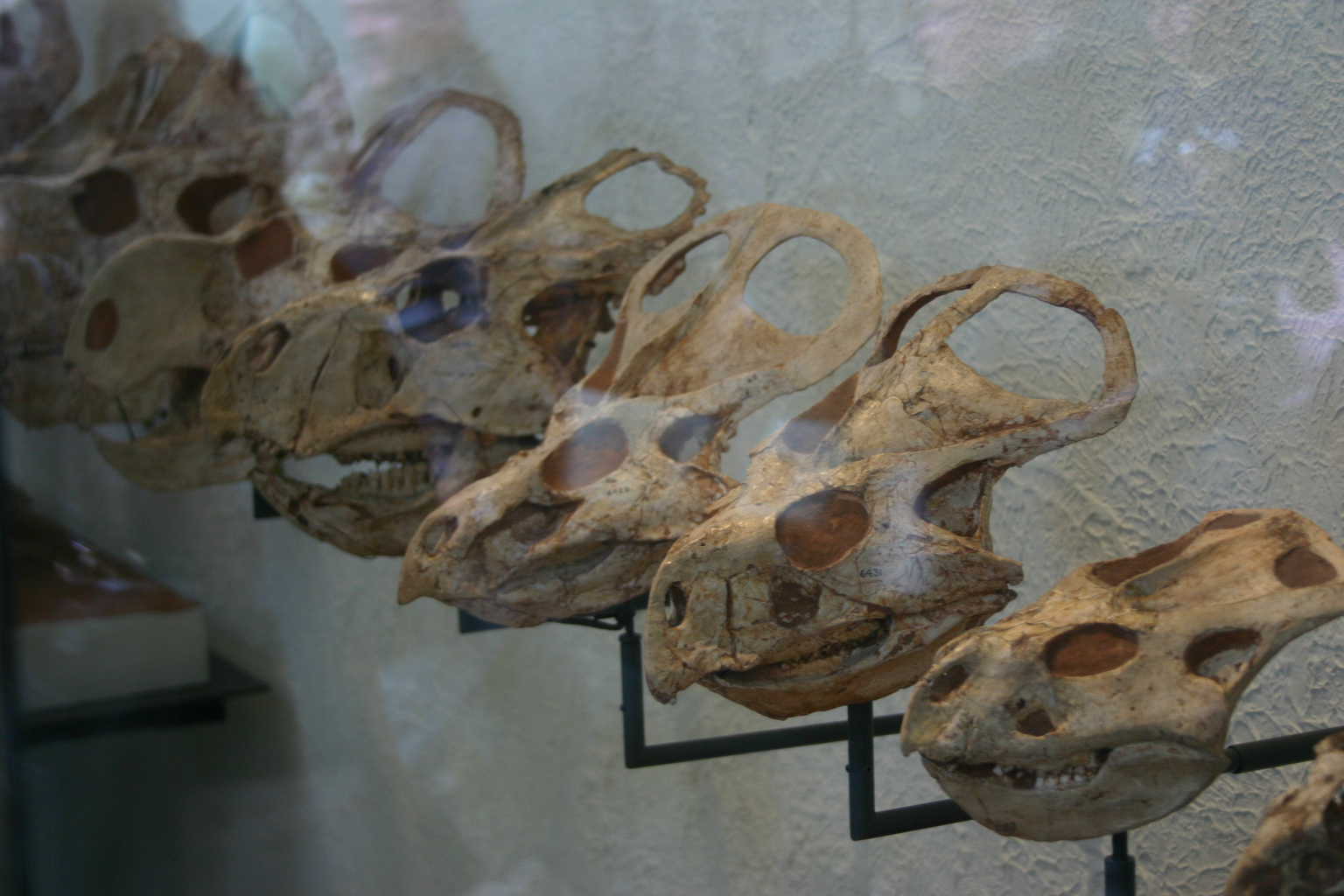
P. andrewsi growth series, featuring the changes in the neck frill

Brown and Schlaikjer in 1940 upon their large description and revision of Protoceratops remarked that the orbits, frontals, and lacrimals suffered a shrinkage in relative size as the animal aged; the top border of the nostrils became more vertical; the nasal bones progressively became elongated and narrowed; and the neck frill as a whole also increases in size with age. The neck frill specifically, underwent a dramatic change from a small, flat, and almost rounded structure in juveniles to a large, fan-like one in fully mature Protoceratops individuals. In 2001, Lambert and colleagues considered the development of the two nasal "horns" of P. hellenikorhinus to be a trait that was delayed in relation to the appearance of sexual-discriminant traits. This was based on the fact that one small specimen (IMM 96BM2/1) has a skull size slightly larger than a presumed sexually mature P. andrewsi skull (AMNH 6409), and yet it lacks double nasal horns present in fully mature P. hellenikorhinus.

Makovicky and team in 2007 conducted a histological analysis on several specimens of Protoceratops from the American Museum of Natural History collections to provide insights into the life history of Protoceratops. The examined fossil bones indicated that Protoceratops slowed its ontogeny (growth) around 9–10 years of life, and it ceased around 11–13 years. They also observed that the maximum or latest stage of development of the neck frill and nasal horn occurred in the oldest Protoceratops individuals, indicating that such traits were ontogenically variable (meaning that they varied with age). Makovicky and team also stated that as the maximum/radical changes on the neck frill and nasal horn were present in most adult individuals, trying to differentiate sexual dimorphism (anatomical differences between sexes) in adult Protoceratops may not be a good practice.

David Hone and colleagues in 2016 upon their analysis of P. andrewsi neck frills, found that the frill of Protoceratops was disproportionally smaller in juveniles, grew at a rapid rate than the rest of the animal during its ontogeny, and reached a considerable size only in large adult individuals. Other changes during ontogeny include the elongation of the premaxillary teeth that are smaller in juveniles and enlarged in adults, and the enlargement of middle neural spines in the tail or caudal vertebrae, which appear to grow much taller when approaching adulthood.

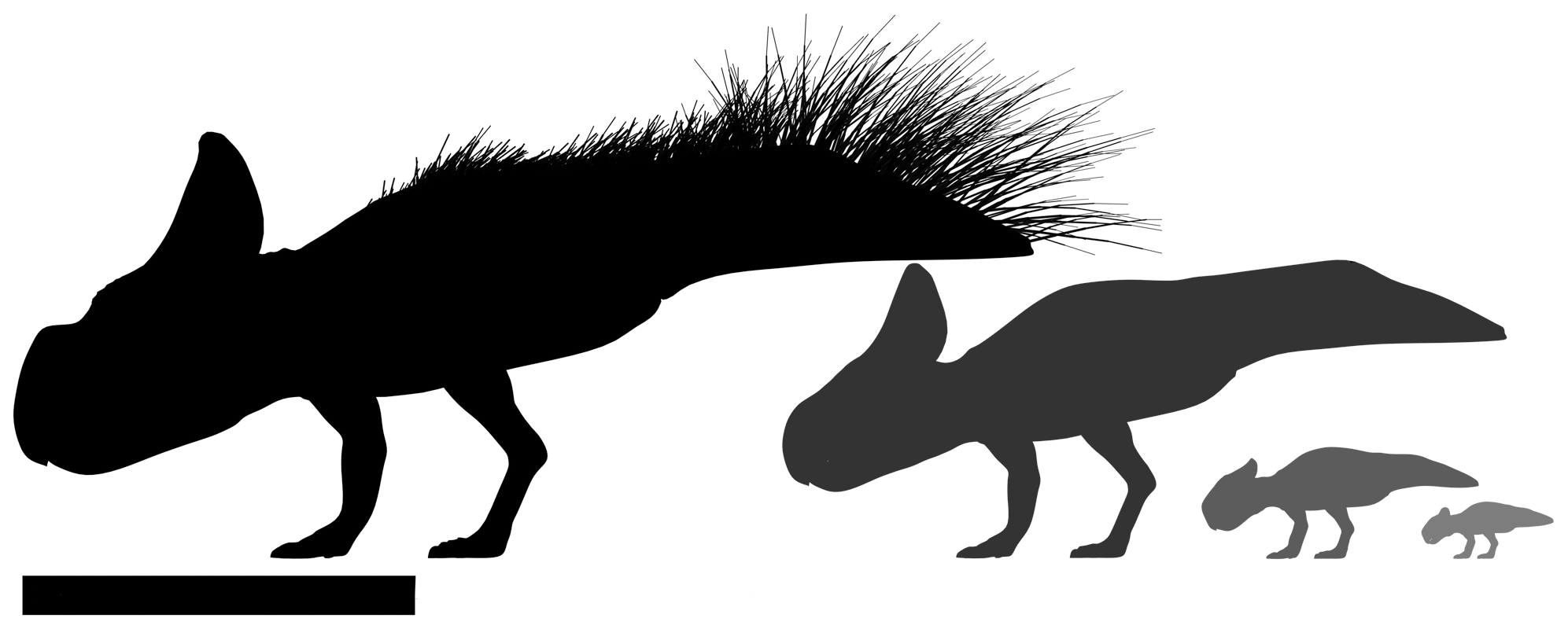
Four growth stages of Protoceratops, from left to right: adult, sub-adult, juvenile and small juvenile (near perinate). Scale bar is 1 m (3.3 ft)

In 2017, Mototaka Saneyoshi with team analyzed several Protoceratops specimens from the Djadokhta Formation, noting that from perinate/juvenile to subadult individuals, the parietal and squamosal bones increased their sides to posterior sides of the skull. From subadult to adult individuals, the squamosal bone increased in size more than the parietal bone, and the frill expanded to a top direction. The team concluded that the frill of Protoceratops can be characterized by these ontogenetic changes.

In 2018, paleontologists Łucja Fostowicz-Frelik and Justyna Słowiak studied the bone histology of several specimens of P. andrewsi through cross-sections, in order to analyze the growth changes in this dinosaur. The sampled elements consisted of neck frill, femur, tibia, fibula, ribs, humerus and radius bones, and showed that the histology of Protoceratops remained rather uniform throughout ontogeny. It was characterized by simple fibrolamellar bone—bony tissue with an irregular, fibrous texture and filled with blood vessels—with prominent woven-fibered bone and low bone remodeling. Most bones of Protoceratops preserve a large abundance of bone fibers (including Sharpey's fibres), which likely gave strength to the organ and enhanced its elasticity. The team also find that the growth rate of the femur increased at the subadult stage, suggesting changes in bone proportions, such as the elongation of the hindlimbs. This growth rate is mostly similar to that of other small herbivorous dinosaurs such as primitive Psittacosaurus or Scutellosaurus.

=== Movement ===
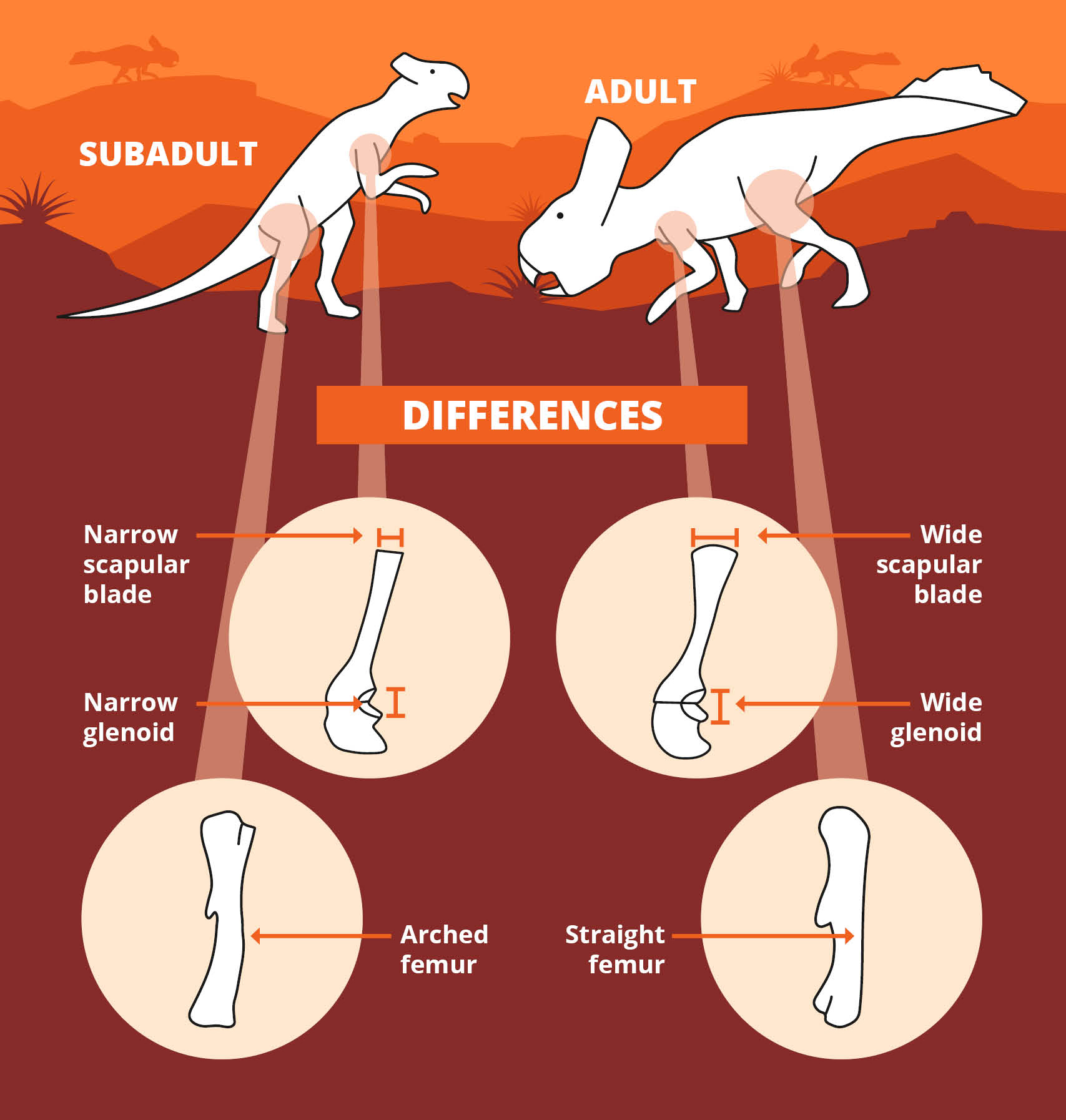
Key differences between Protoceratops adults and juveniles

In 1996, Tereshchenko reconstructed the walking model of Protoceratops where he considered the most likely scenario to be Protoceratops as an obligate quadruped given the proportions of its limbs. The main gait of Protoceratops was probably trot-like mostly using its hindlimbs and it is unlikely to have used an asymmetric gait. If trapped in a specific situation (like danger or foraging), Protoceratops could have employed a rapid, facultative bipedalism. He also noted that the flat and wide pedal unguals of Protoceratops may have allowed efficient walking through loose terrain, such as sand which was common on its surroundings. Tereshchenko using speed equations also estimated the average maximum walking speed of Protoceratops at about 3 km/h (kilometres per hour).

Upon the analysis of the forelimbs of several ceratopsians, Phil Senter in 2007 suggested that the hands of Protoceratops could reach the ground when the hindlimbs were upright, and the overall forelimb morphology and range of motion may reflect that it was at least a facultative (optional) quadruped. The forelimbs of Protoceratops could sprawl laterally but not for quadrupedal locomotion, which was accomplished with the elbows tucked in. In 2010 Alexander Kuznetsov and Tereshchenko analyzed several vertebrae series of Protoceratops to estimate overall mobility, and concluded that Protoceratops had greater lateral mobility in the presacral (pre-hip) vertebrae series and reduced vertical mobility in the cervical (neck) region. The fossilized footprint associated with the specimen ZPAL Mg D-II/3 described by Niedźwiedzki in 2012 indicates that Protoceratops was digitigrade, meaning that it walked with its toes supporting the body weight.

In 2019 however, Słowiak and team described the limb elements of ZPAL Mg D-II/3, which represents a sub-adult individual, and noted a mix of characters typical of bipedal ceratopsians such as a narrow glenoid with scapular blade and an arched femur. The absence of these traits in mature individuals indicates that young Protoceratops were capable of facultative bipedal locomotion and adults had an obligate quadrupedal stance. Even though adult Protoceratops were stocky and quadruped, their tibia-femur length ratio—the tibia being longer than femur, a trait present in bipedal ceratopsians—suggests the ability to occasionally stand on their hindlimbs. Słowiak and team also suggested that the flat and wide hand unguals (claw bone) of Protoceratops may have been useful for moving on loose terrain (such as sand) without sinking.

=== Digging behavior ===
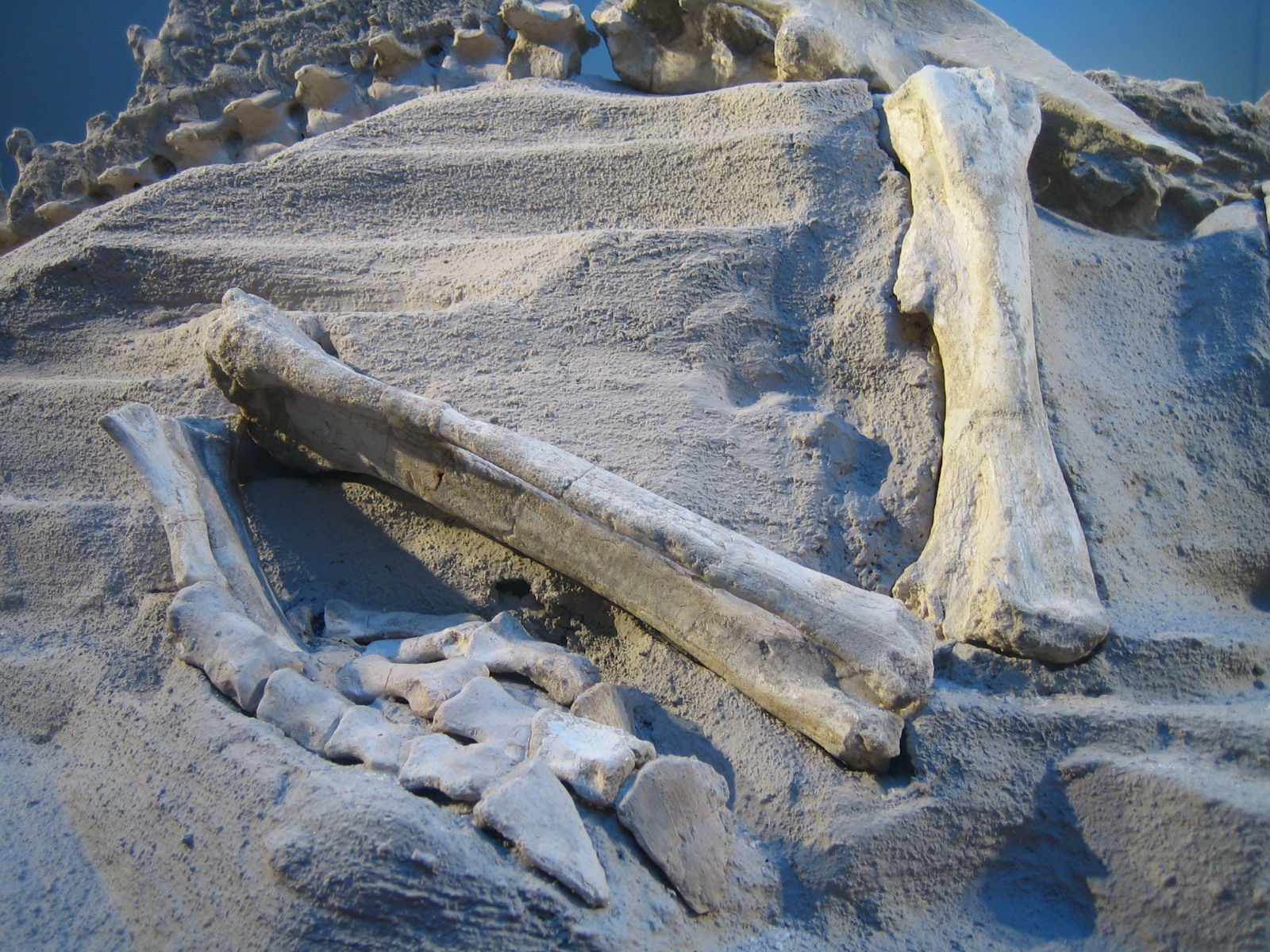
Fossil cast of P. andrewsi showing left hindlimb, equipped with large, flat, shovel-like unguals

Longrich in 2010 proposed that Protoceratops may have used its hindlimbs to dig burrows or take shelter under bushes and/or scrapes to escape the hottest temperatures of the day. A digging action with the hindlimbs was likely facilitated by the strong caudofemoralis muscle and its large feet equipped with flat, shovel-like unguals. As this behavior would have been common in Protoceratops, it predisposed individuals to become entombed alive during the sudden collapse of their burrows and high energy sand-bearing events—such as sandstorms—and thus explaining the standing in-situ posture of some specimens. Additionally, Longrich suggested that a backward burrowing could explain the preservation of some specimens pointing forward with curved tails.

In 2019, Victoria M. Arbour and David C. Evans cited the robusticity of the ulna of Ferrisaurus as a useful feature for digging, which may have been also true for Protoceratops.

=== Tail function ===
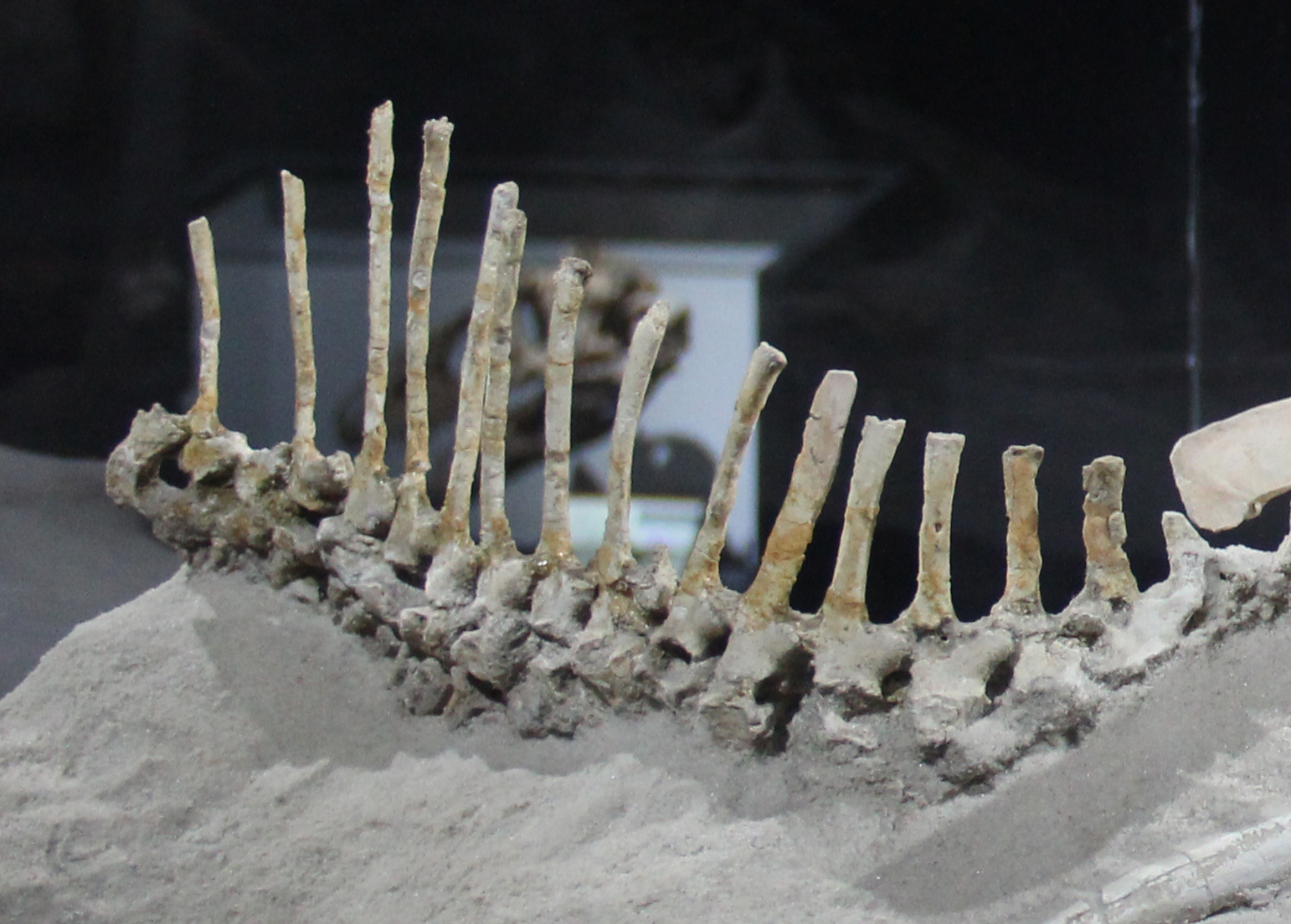
Elevated neural spines of the caudal (tail) vertebrae of an assigned Protoceratops specimen

Gregory and Mook in 1925 suggested that Protoceratops was partially aquatic because of its large feet—being larger than the hands—and the very long neural spines found in the caudal (tail) vertebrae. Brown and Schlaikjer in 1940 indicated that the expansion of the distal (lower) ischial end may reflect a strong ischiocaudalis muscle, which together with the high tail neural spines were used for swimming. Barsbold in his brief 1974 description of the Fighting Dinosaurs specimen accepted this hypothesis and suggested that Protoceratops was amphibious (water-adapted) and had well-developed swimming capacities based on its side to side flattened tail with very high neural spines.

Jack Bowman Bailey in 1997 disagreed with previous aquatic hypotheses and indicated that the high caudal neural spines were instead more reminiscent of bulbous tails of some desert lizard species (such as Heloderma or Uromastyx), which are related to store fat with metabolic water in the tail. He considered a swimming adaptation unlikely given the arid settings of the Djadokhta Formation.

In 2008, based on the occurrence of some Protoceratops specimens in fluvial (river-deposited) sediments from the Djadokhta Formation and heterocoelous (vertebral centra that are saddle-shaped at both ends) caudal vertebrae of protoceratopsids, Tereshchenko concluded that the elevated caudal spines are a swimming adaptation. He proposed that protoceratopsids moved through water using their laterally flattened tails as a paddle to aid in swimming. According to Tereschenko, Bagaceratops was fully aquatic while Protoceratops was only partially aquatic. Longrich in 2010 argued that the high tail and frill of Protoceratops may have helped it to shed excess heat during the day—acting as large-surface structures—when the animal was active in order to survive in the relatively arid environments of the Djadokhta Formation without highly developed cooling mechanisms.

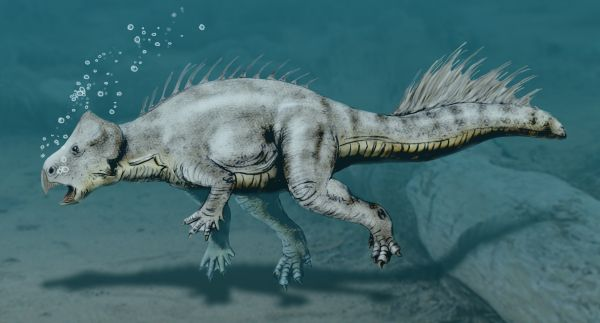
Koreaceratops restored in a swimming behavior. This hypothesis has not yet reached a consensus

In 2011, during the description of Koreaceratops, Yuong-Nam Lee and colleagues found the above swimming hypotheses hard to prove based on the abundance of Protoceratops in eolian (wind-deposited) sediments that were deposited in prominent arid environments. They also pointed out that while taxa such as Leptoceratops and Montanoceratops are recovered from fluvial sediments, they are estimated to be some of the poorest swimmers. Lee and colleagues concluded that even though the tail morphology of Koreaceratops—and other basal ceratopsians—does not argues against swimming habits, the cited evidence for it is insufficient.

Tereschhenko in 2013 examined the structure of the caudal vertebrae spines of Protoceratops, concluding that it had adaptations for terrestrial and aquatic habits. Observations made found that the high number of caudal vertebrae may have been useful for swimming and use the tail to counter-balance weight. He also indicated that the anterior caudals were devoid of high neural spines and had increased mobility—a mobility that stars to decrease towards the high neural spines—, which suggest that the tail could be largely raised from its base. It is likely that Protoceratops raised its tail as a signal (display) or females could use this method during egg laying to expand and relax the cloaca.

In 2016, Hone and team indicated that the tail of Protoceratops, particularly the mid region with elevated neural spines, could have been used in display to impress potential mates and/or for species recognition. The tail may have been related with structures like the frill for displaying behavior.

Kim with team in 2019 cited the elongated tail spines as well-suited for swimming. They indicated that both Bagaceratops and Protoceratops may have used their tails in a similar fashion during similar situations, such as swimming, given how similar their postcranial skeletons were. The team also suggested that a swimming adaptation could have been useful to avoid aquatic predators, such as crocodylomorphs.

=== Social behavior ===
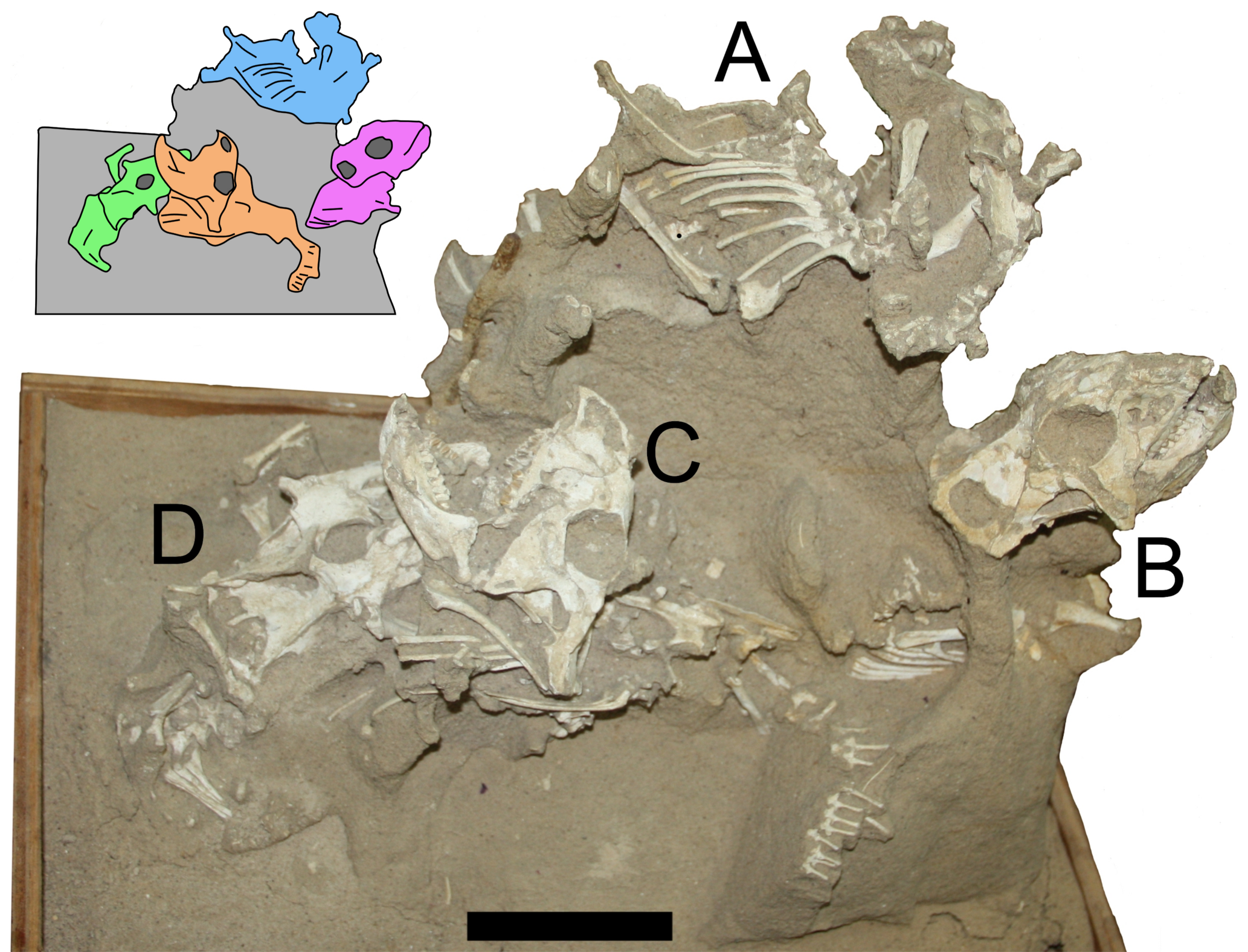
P. andrewsi specimen MPC-D 100/526

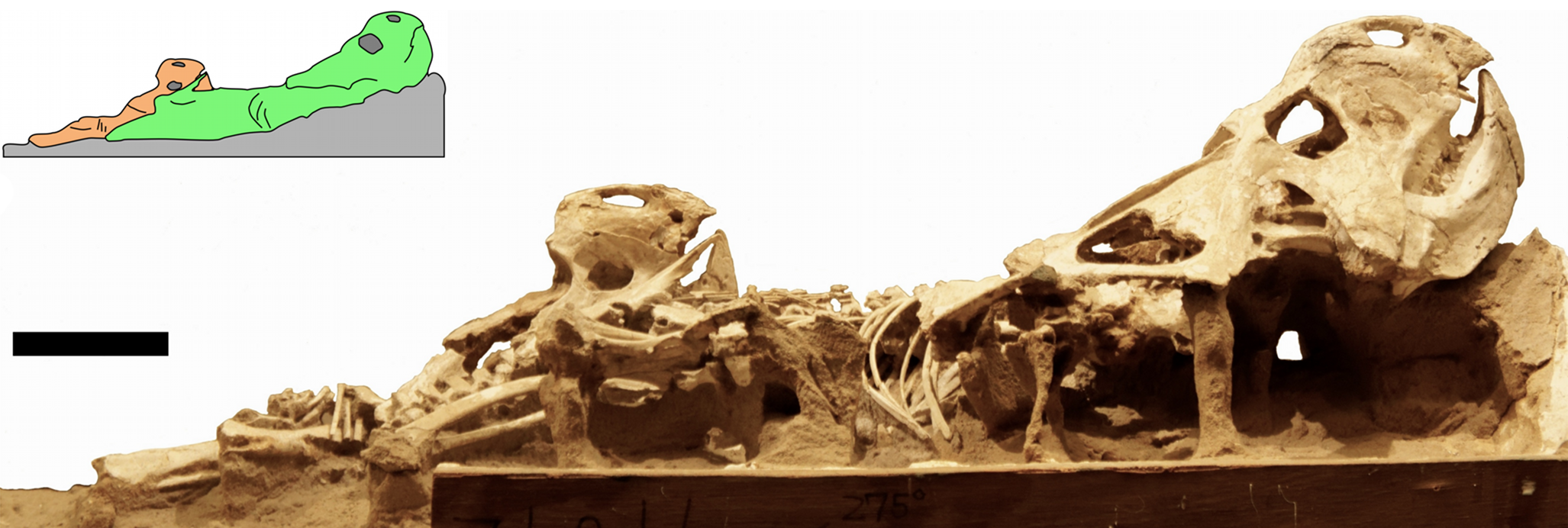
P. andrewsi specimen MPC-D 100/534

Tomasz Jerzykiewiczz in 1993 reported several monospecific (containing only one dominant species) death assemblages of Protoceratops from the Bayan Mandahu and Djadokhta formations. A group of five medium-sized and adult Protoceratops was observed at the Bayan Mandahu locality. Individuals within this assemblage were lying on their bellies with their heads facing upwards, side by side parallel-aligned, and inclined about 21 degrees from the horizontal plane. Two other groups were found at the Tugriken Shireh locality; one group containing six individuals and another group of about 12 skeletons.

In 2014, David W. E. Hone and colleagues reported and described two blocks containing death assemblages of P. andrewsi from Tugriken Shireh. The first block (MPC-D 100/526) comprises four juvenile individuals in close proximity with their heads pointing upwards, and the second block (MPC-D 100/534) is composed of two sub-adults with a horizontal orientation. Based on previous assemblages and the two blocks, the team determined that Protoceratops was a social dinosaur that formed herds throughout its life and such herds would have varied in composition, with some including adults, sub-adults, siblings from a single nest or local members of a herd joining shortly after hatching. However, as the group could have loss members by predation or other factors, the remnants individuals would aggregate into larger groups to increase their survival. Hone and colleagues in particular suggested that juveniles would aggregate primarily as a defense against predators and an increased protection from the multiple adults within the group. The team also indicated that, while Protoceratops provides direct evidence for the formation of single cohort aggregations throughout its lifespan, it cannot be ruled out the possibility that some Protoceratops were solitary.

=== Sexual dimorphism and display ===
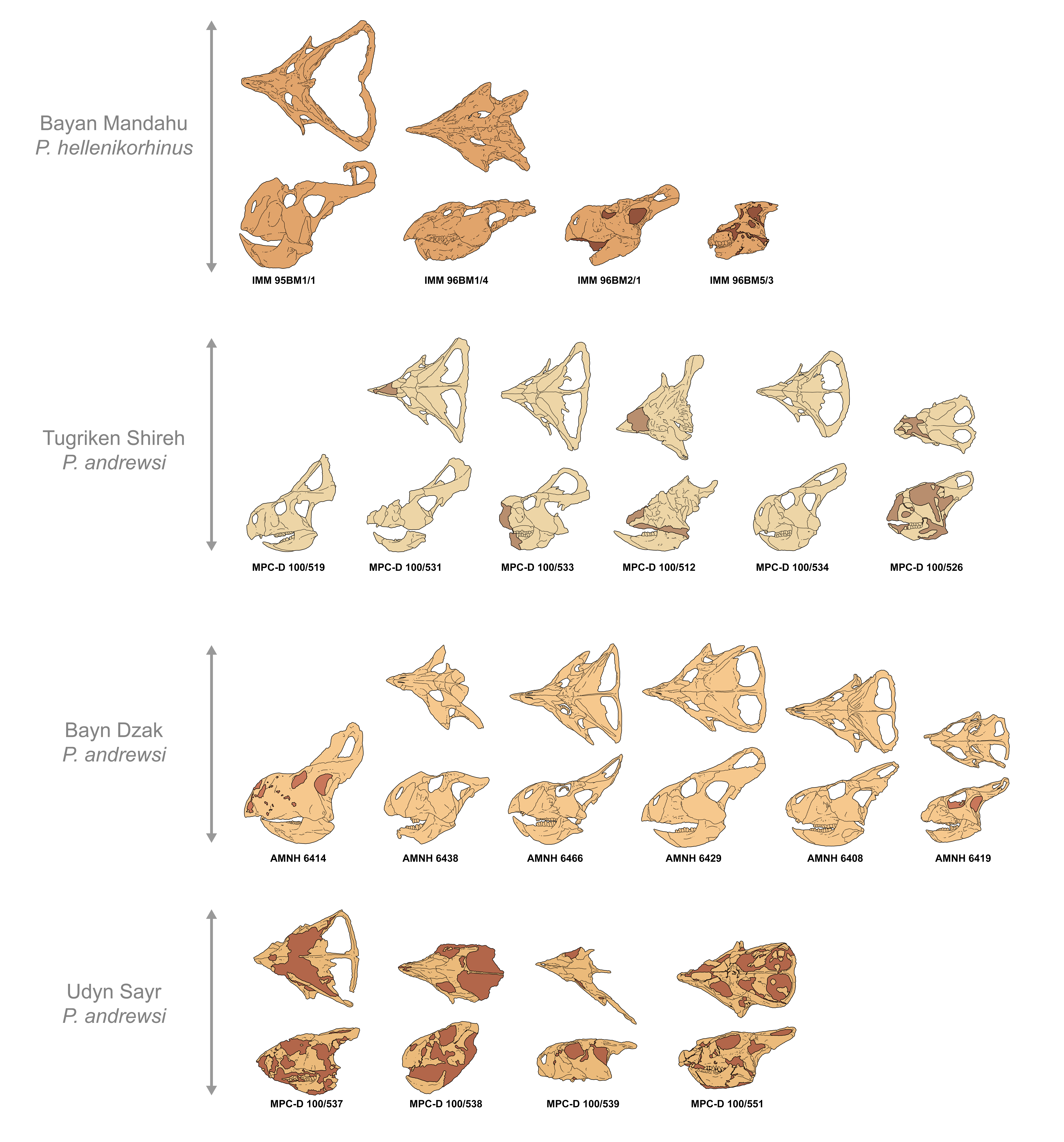
Diagram featuring specimens of P. andrewsi and P. hellenikorhinus, showcasing a wide range of variability

Brown and Schlaikjer in 1940 upon their large analysis of Protoceratops noted the potential presence of sexual dimorphism among specimens in P. andrewsi, concluding that this condition could be entirely subjective or represent actual differences between sexes. Individuals with a high nasal horn, massive prefrontals, and frontoparietal depression were tentatively determined as males. Females were mostly characterized by the lack of well-developed nasal horns. In 1972 Kurzanov made comparisons between P. andrewsi skulls from Bayn Dzak and Tugriken Shireh, noting differences on the nasal horn within populations.

Peter Dodson in 1996 used anatomical characters of the skull in P. andrewsi to quantify areas subject to ontogenic changes and sexual dimorphism. In total, 40 skull characters were measured and compared, including regions like the frill and nasal horn. Dodson found most of these characters to be highly variable across specimens, especially the frill which he interpreted to have had a bigger role in displaying behavior than simply serving as a site of masticatory muscles. He considered unlikely such interpretation based on the relative fragility of some frill bones and the large individual variation, which may have affected the development of those muscles. The length of the frill was found by Dodson to have a rather irregular growth in specimens, as juvenile AMNH 6419 was observed with a frill length smaller than other juveniles. He agreed with Brown and Schlaikjer in that a high, well-developed nasal horn represents a male trait and the opposite indicates females. In addition, Dodson suggested that traits like the nasal horn and frill in male Protoceratops may have been important visual displays for attracting females and repelling other males, or even predators. Lastly, he noted that both males and females had not significant disparity in body size, and that sexual maturity in Protoceratops could be recognised at the moment when males can be distinguished from females.

In 2001, Lambert and team upon the description of P. hellenikorhinus also noted variation within individuals. For instance, some specimens (e.g., holotype IMM 95BM1/1) preserve high nasal bones with a pair of horns; relatively short antorbital length; and vertically oriented nostrils. Such traits were regarded as representing male P. hellenikorhinus. The other group of skulls is characterized by low nasals that have undeveloped horns; a relatively longer antorbital length; and more oblique nostrils. These individuals were considered as females. The team however, was not able to produce deeper analysis regarding sexual dimorphism in P. hellenikorhinus due to the lack of complete specimens. Also in 2001, Tereschhenko analyzed several specimens of P. andrewsi to evaluate sexual dimorphism. He found 19 anatomical differences in the vertebral column and pelvic region of regarded male and female Protoceratops individuals, which he considered to represent actual sexual characters.

In 2012, Naoto Handa and colleagues described four specimens of P. andrewsi from the Udyn Sayr locality of the Djadokhta Formation. They indicated that sexual dimorphism in this population was marked by a prominent nasal horn in males—trait also noted by other authors—relative wider nostrils in females, and a wider neck frill in males. Despite maintaining the skull morphology of most Protoceratops specimens (such as premaxillary teeth), the neck frill in this population was straighter with a near triangular shape. Handa and team in addition found variation across this Udyn Sayr sample and classified them in three groups. First group includes individuals with a well-developed bony ridge on the lateral surface of the squamosal bone, and the posterior border of the squamosal is backwards oriented. Second group had a fairly rounded posterior border of the squamosal, and a long and well-developed bony ridge on the posterior border of the parietal bone. Lastly, the third group was characterized by a curved posterior border of the squamosal and a notorious rugose texture on the top surface of the parietal. Such skull traits were regarded as marked intraspecific variation within Protoceratops, and they differ from other populations across the Djadokhta Formation (like Tugriken Shireh), being unique to the Udyn Sayr region. These neck frill morphologies differ from those of Protoceratops from the Djadokhta Formation in the adjacent dinosaur locality Tugrikin Shire. The morphological differences among the Udyn Sayr specimens may indicate intraspecific variation of Protoceratops. A large and well-developed bony ridge on the parietal has been observed on another P. andrewsi specimen, MPC-D 100/551, also from Udyn Sayr.

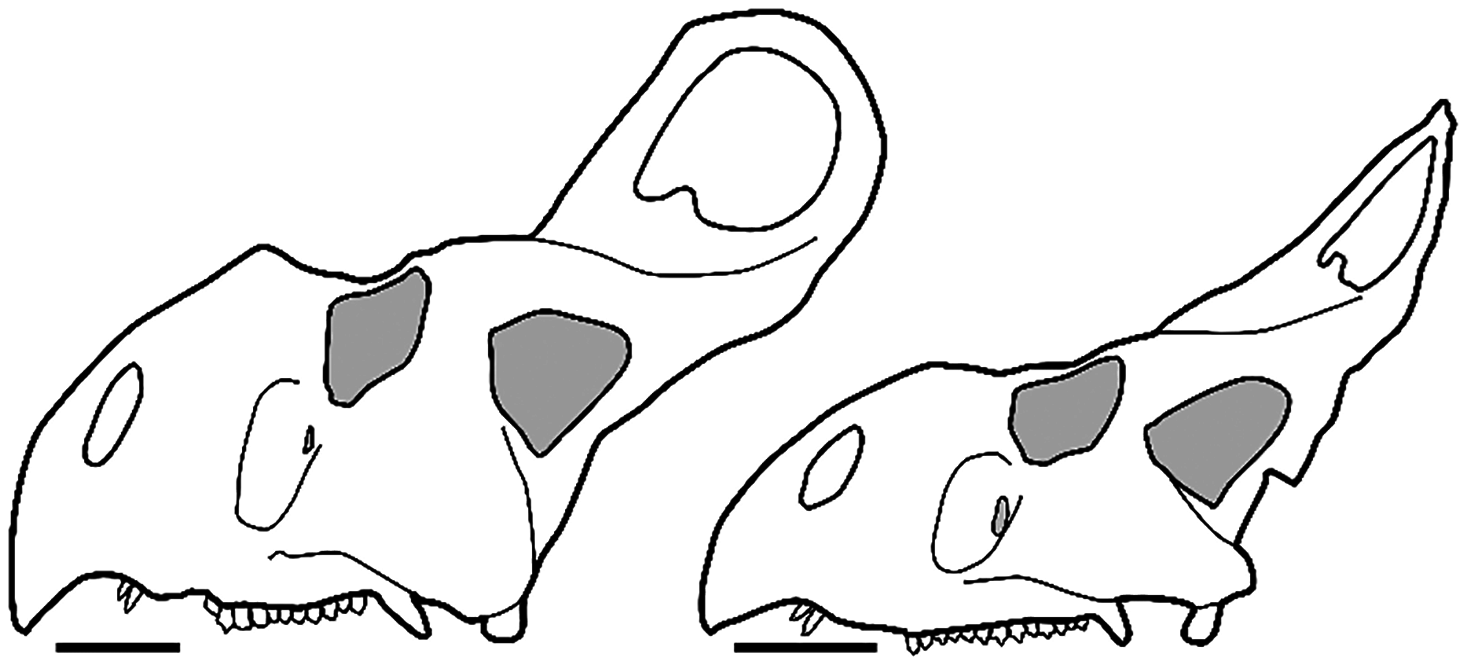
Hypothetical male (left, AMNH 6438) and female (AMNH 6466) P. andrewsi compared

However, Leonardo Maiorino with team in 2015 performed a large geometric morphometric analysis using 29 skulls of P. andrewsi to evaluate actual sexual dimorphism. Obtained results indicated that other than the nasal horn—which remained as the only skull trait with potential sexual dimorphism—all previously suggested characters to differentiate hyphotetical males from females were more linked to ontogenic changes and intraspecific variation independent of sex, most notably the neck frill. The geometrics showed no consistent morphological differences between specimens that were regarded as males and females by previous authors, but also a slight support for differences in the rostrum across the sample. Maiorino and team nevertheless, cited that the typical regarded Protoceratops male, AMNH 6438, pretty much resembles the rostrum morphology of AMNH 6466, a typical regarded female. However, they suggested that authentic differences between sexes could be still present in the postcranial skeleton. Although previously suggested for P. hellenikorhinus, the team argued that the sample used for this species was not sufficient, and given that sexual dimorphism was not recovered in P. andrewsi, it is unlikely that it occurred in P. hellenikorhinus.

In 2016, Hone and colleagues analyzed 37 skulls of P. andrewsi, finding that the neck frill of Protoceratops (in both length and width) underwent positive allometry during ontongeny, that is, a faster growth/development of this region than the rest of the animal. The jugal bones also showed a trend towards an increase in relative size. These results suggest that they functioned as socio-sexual dominance signals, or, they were mostly used in display. The use of the frill as a displaying structure may be related to other anatomical features of Protoceratops such as the premaxillary teeth (at least for P. andrewsi) which could have been used in display or intraspecific combat, or the high neural spines of tail. On the other hand, Hone and team argued that if neck frills were instead used for protective purposes, a large frill may have acted as an aposematic (warning) signal to predators. However, such strategies are most effective when the taxon is rare in the overall environment, opposed to Protoceratops which appears to be an extremely abundant and medium-sized dinosaur.

Tereschenko in 2018 examined the cervical vertebrae series of six P. andrewsi specimens. Most of them had differences in the same exact vertebra, such as the shape and proportions of the vertebral centra and orientation of neural arches. According these differences, four groups were identified, concluding that individual variation was extended to the vertebral column of Protoceratops.

In 2020 nevertheless, Andrew C. Knapp and team conducted morphometric analyses of a large sample of P. andrewsi specimens, primarily confluding that the neck frill of Protoceratops has no indicators or evidence for being sexually dimorphic. Obtained results showed instead that several regions of the skull of Protoceratops independently varied in their rate of growth, ontogenetic shape and morphology; a high growth of the frill during ontogeny in relation to other body regions; and a large variability of the neck frill independent of size. Knapp and team noted that results of the frill indicate that this structure had a major role in signaling within the species, consistent with selection of potential mates with quality ornamentation and hence reproductive success, or dominance signaling. Such use of the frill may suggest that intraspecific social behavior was highly important for Protoceratops. Results also support the general hypothesis that the neck frill of ceratopsians functioned as a socio-sexual signal structure.

=== Reproduction ===
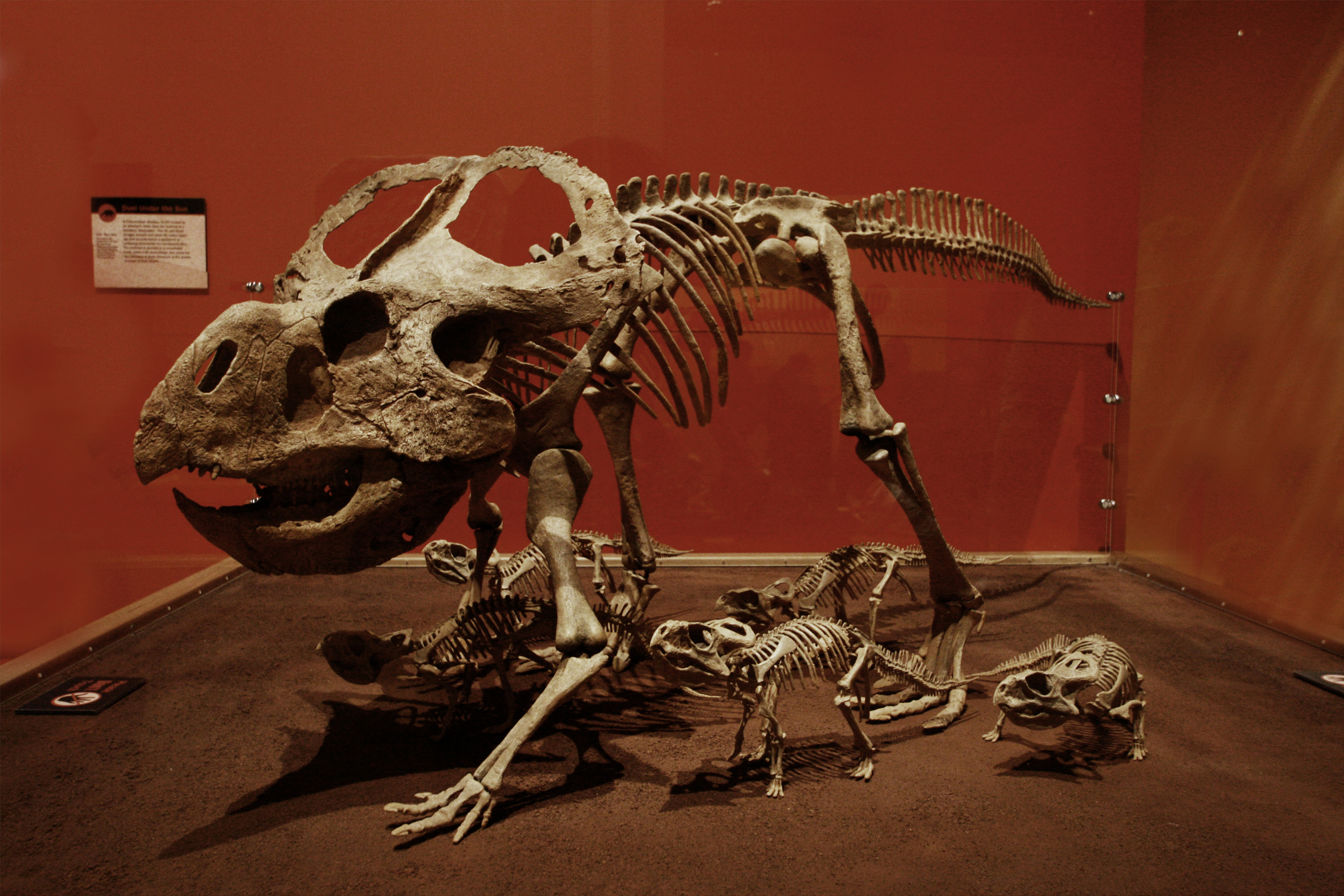
Skeletal mount of Protoceratops with juveniles

In 1989, Walter P. Coombs concluded that crocodilians, ratite and megapode birds were suitable modern analogs for dinosaur nesting behavior. He largely considered elongatoolithid eggs to belong to Protoceratops because adult skeletons were found in close proximity to nests, interpreting this as an evidence for parental care. Furthermore, Coombs considered the large concentration of Protoceratops eggs at small regions as an indicator of marked philopatric nesting (nesting in the same area). The nest of Protoceratops would have been excavated with the hindlimbs and was built in a mound-like, crater-shaped center structure with the eggs arranged in semicircular fashion. Richard A. Thulborn in 1992 analyzed the different types of eggs and nests—the majority of them, in fact, elongatoolithid—referred to Protoceratops and their structure. He identified types A and B, both of them sharing the elongated shape. Type A eggs differed from type B eggs in having a pinched end. Based on comparisons with other ornithischian dinosaurs such as Maiasaura and Orodromeus—known from more complete nests—Thulborn concluded that most depictions of Protoceratops nests were based on incompletely preserved clutches and mostly on type A eggs, which were more likely to have been laid by an ornithopod. He concluded that nests were built in a shallow mound with the eggs laid radially, contrary to popular restorations of crater-like Protoceratops nests.

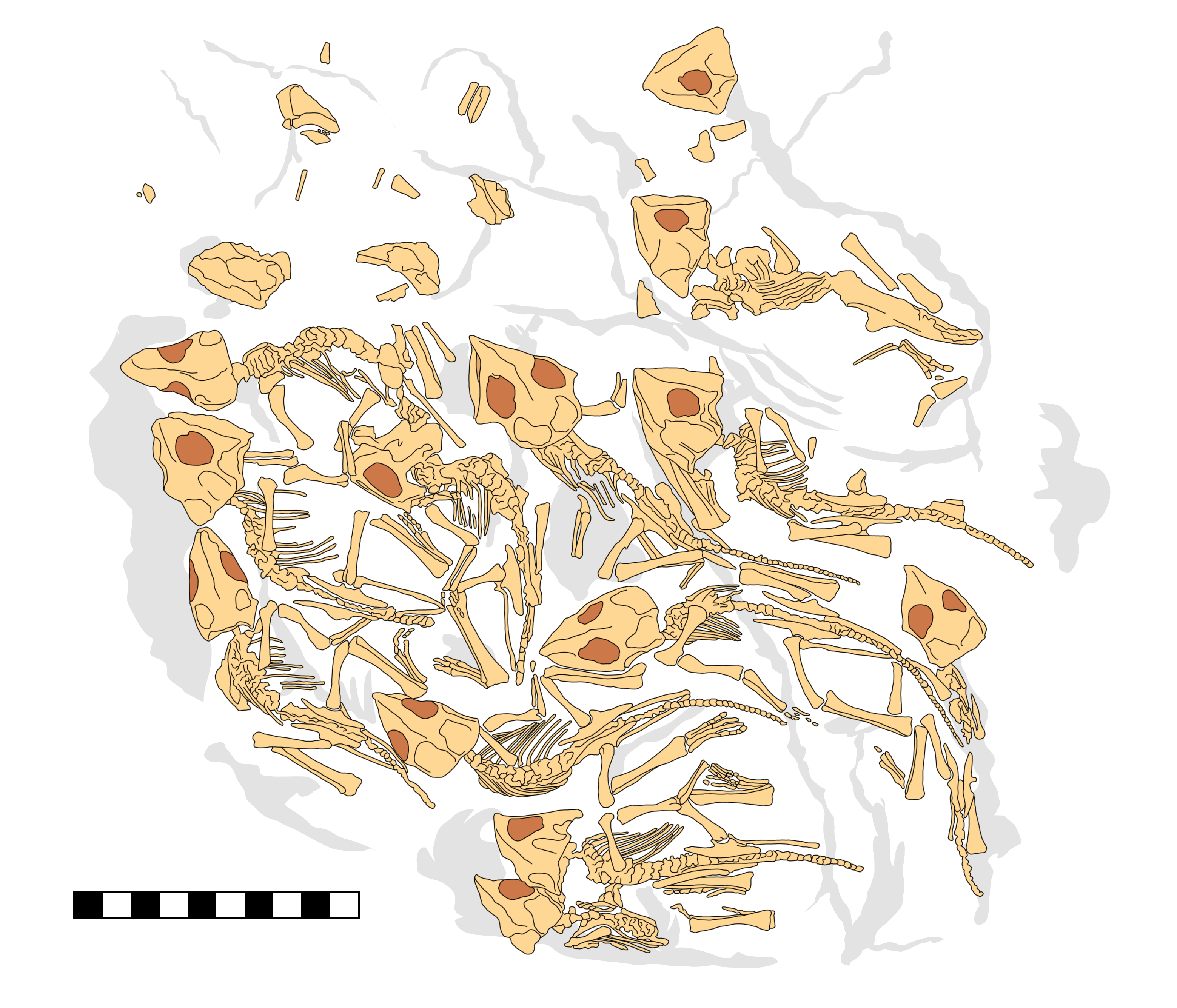
Protoceratops nest MPC-D 100/530. Scale bar is 10 cm (100 mm)

In 2011, the first authentic nest of Protoceratops (MPC-D 100/530) from the Tugriken Shireh locality was described by David E. Fastovsky and team. As some individuals are closely appressed along the well-defined margin of the nest, it may have had a circular or semi-circular shape—as previously hypothetized—with a diameter of 70 cm (700 mm). Most of the individuals within the nest had nearly the same age, size and growth, suggesting that they belonged to a single nest, rather than an aggregate of individuals. Fastovsky and team also suggested that even though the individuals were young, they were not perinates based on the absence of eggshell fragments and their large size compared to even more smaller juveniles from this locality. The fact that the individuals likely spend some time in the nest after hatching for growth suggests that Protoceratops parents might have cared for their young at nests during at least the early stages of life. As Protoceratops was a relatively basal (primitive) ceratopsian, the finding may imply that other ceratopsians provided care for their young as well.

In 2017, Gregory M. Erickson and colleagues determined the incubation periods of P. andrewsi and Hypacrosaurus by using lines of arrested growth (LAGS; lines of growth) of the teeth in embryonic specimens (Protoceratops egg clutch MPC-D 100/1021). The results suggests a mean embryonic tooth replacement period of 30.68 days and relatively plesiomorphically (ancestral-shared) long incubation times for P. andrewsi, with a minimum incubation time of 83.16 days. Norell and team in 2020 analyzed again this clutch and concluded that Protoceratops laid soft-shelled eggs. Most embryos within this clutch have a flexed position and the outlines of eggs are also present, suggesting that they were buried in ovo (in the egg). The outlines of eggs and embryos indicates ellipsoid-shaped eggs in life with dimensions about 12 cm (120 mm) long and 6 cm (60 mm) wide. Several of the embryos were associated with a black to white halo (circumference). Norell and team performed histological examinations to its chemical composition, finding traces of proteinaceous eggshells, and when compared to other sauropsids the team concluded that they were not biomineralized in life and thus soft-shelled. Given that soft-shelled eggs are more vulnerable to deshydratation and crushing, Protoceratops may have buried its eggs in moisturized sand or soil. The growing embryos therefore relied on external heat and parental care.

=== Paleopathology ===
In 2018, Tereshchenko examined and described several articulated cervical vertebrae of P. andrewsi and reported the presence of two abnormally fused vertebrae (specimen PIN 3143/9). The fusion of the vertebrae was likely a product of disease or external damage.

=== Predator–prey interactions ===
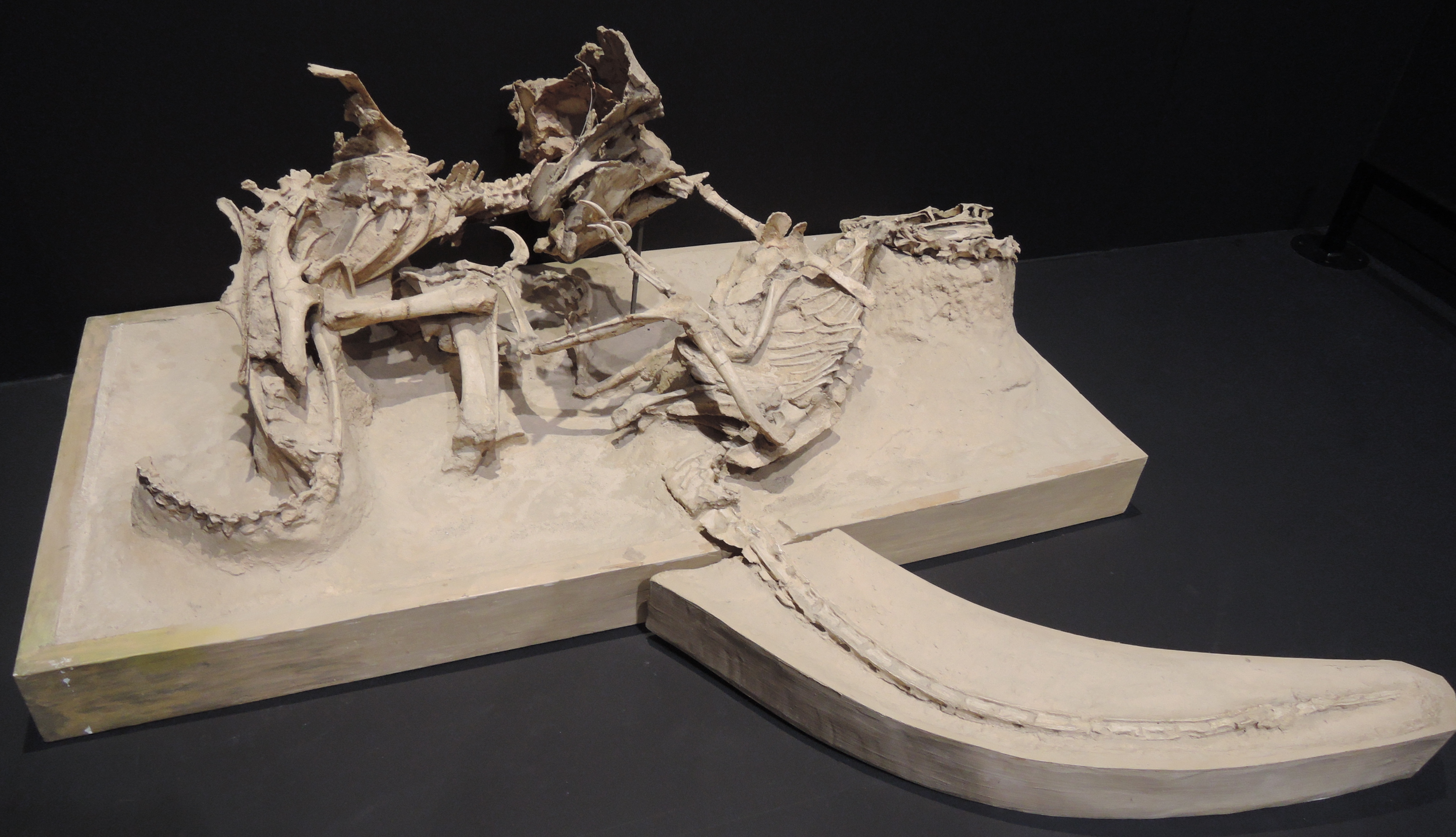
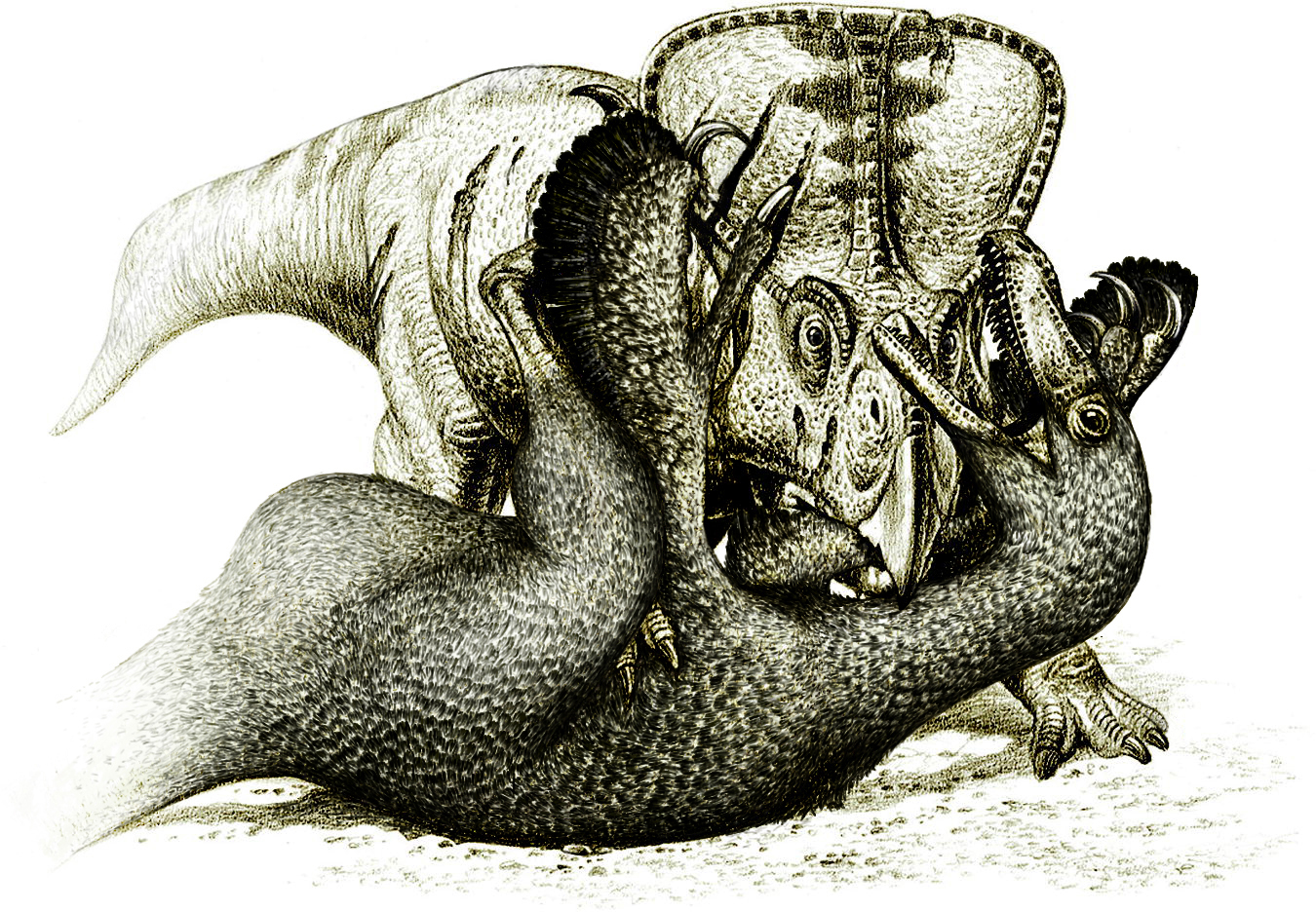
Fossil cast of the Fighting Dinosaurs specimen (left) and life restoration of same depicting the fight (right)

Barsbold in 1974 shortly described the Fighting Dinosaurs specimen and discussed possible scenarios. The Velociraptor has its right leg pinned under the Protoceratops body with its left sickle claw oriented into the throat region. The Protoceratops bit the right hand of the predator, implying that it was unable to escape. Barsbold suggested that both animals drowned as they fell into a swamp-like body of water or, the relatively quicksand-like bottom of a lake could have kept them together during the last moments of their fight.

Osmólska in 1993 proposed another two hypotheses to explain their preservation. During the death struggle, a large dune may have collapsed simultaneously burying both Protoceratops and Velociraptor. Another proposal is that the Velociraptor was scavenging an already dead Protoceratops when it got buried and eventually killed by indeterminate circumstances.

In 1995, David M. Unwin and colleagues cast doubt on previous explanations especially a scavenging hypothesis as there were numerous indications of a concurrent death event. For instance, the Protoceratops has a semi-erect stance and its skull is nearly horizontal, which could have not been possible if the animal was already dead. The Velociraptor has its right hand trapped within the jaws of the Protoceratops and the left one grasping the Protoceratops skull. Moreover, it lies on the floor with its feet directed to the prey's belly and throat areas, indicating that this Velociraptor was not scavenging. Unwin and colleagues examined the sediments surrounding the specimen and suggested that the two were buried alive by a powerful sandstorm. They interpreted the interaction as the Protoceratops being grasped and dispatched with kicks delivered by the low-lying Velociraptor. They also considered possible that populations of Velociraptor were aware of crouching behaviors in Protoceratops during high-energy sandstorms and used it for successful hunts.

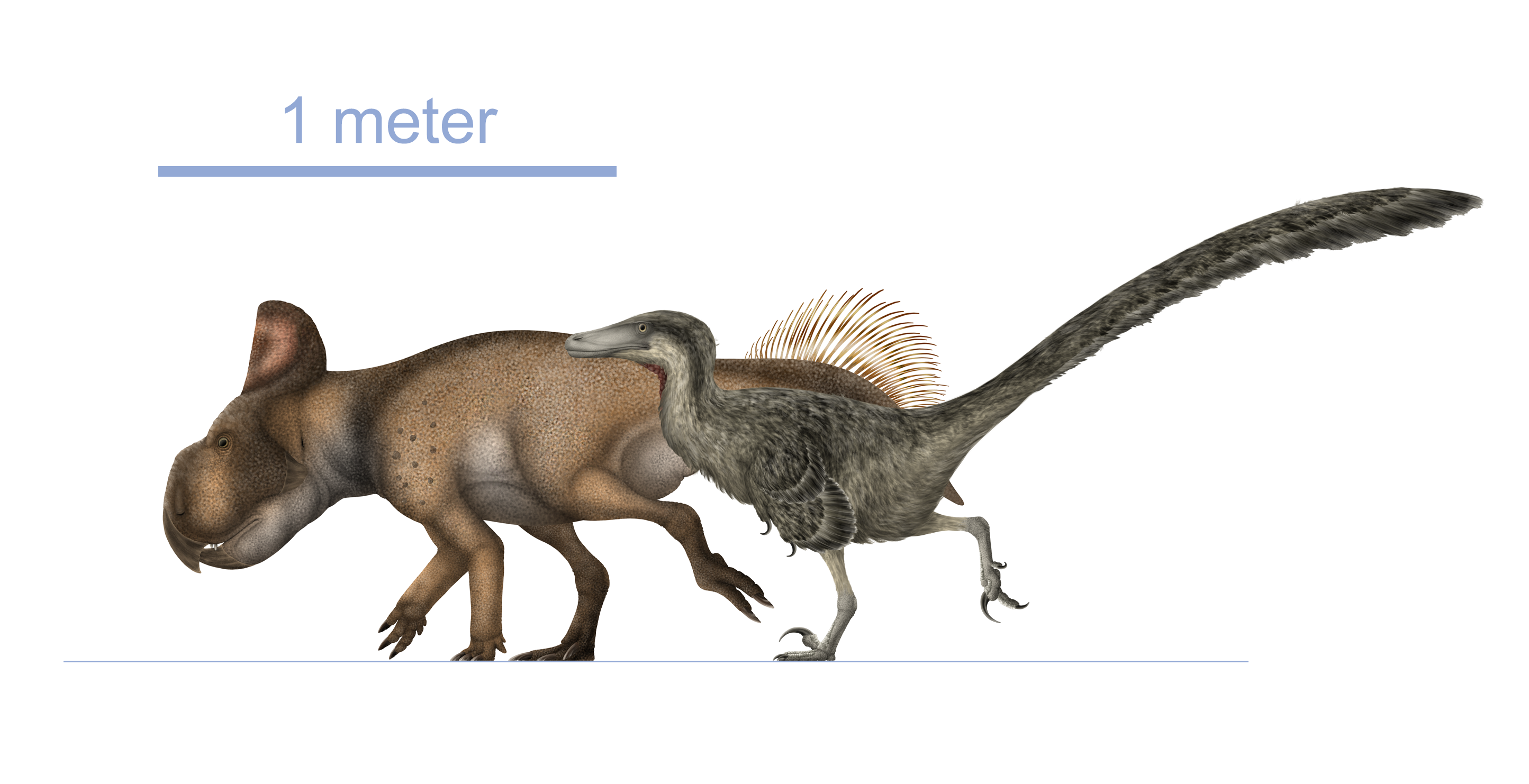
Size of the Fighting Dinosaurs

Kenneth Carpenter in 1998 considered the Fighting Dinosaurs specimen to be conclusive evidence for theropods as active predators and not scavengers. He suggested another scenario where the multiple wounds delivered by the Velociraptor on the Protoceratops throat had the latter animal bleeding to death. As a last effort, the Protoceratops bit the right hand of the predator and trapped it beneath its own weight, causing the eventual death and desiccation of the Velociraptor. The missing limbs of the Protoceratops were afterwards taken by scavengers. Lastly, both animals were buried by sand. Given that the Velociraptor is relatively complete, Carpenter suggested that it may have been completely or partially buried by sand.

In 2010, David Hone with team reported a new interaction between Velociraptor and Protoceratops based on tooth marks. Several fossils were collected at the Gate locality of the Bayan Mandahu Formation in 2008, including teeth and body remains of protoceratopsid and velociraptorine dinosaurs. The team referred these elements to Protoceratops and Velociraptor mainly based on their abundance across the unit, although they admitted that reported remains could represent different, yet related taxa (in this case, Linheraptor instead of Velociraptor). At least eight body fossils of Protoceratops present active teeth marks, which were interpreted as feeding traces. Much in contrast to the Fighting Dinosaurs specimen, the tooth marks are inferred to have been produced by the dromaeosaurid during late-stage carcass consumption either during scavenging or following a group kill. The team stated that feeding by Velociraptor upon Protoceratops was probably a relatively common occurrence in these environments, and that this ceratopsian actively formed part of the diet of Velociraptor.

In 2016, Barsbold re-examined the Fighting Dinosaurs specimen and found several anomalies within the Protoceratops individual: both coracoids have small bone fragments indicatives of a breaking of the pectoral girdle; the right forelimb and scapulocoracoid are torn off to the left and backward relative to its torso. He concluded that the prominent displacement of pectoral elements and right forelimb was caused by an external force that tried to tear them out. Since this event likely occurred after the death of both animals or during a point where movement was not possible, and the Protoceratops is missing other body elements, Barsbold suggested that scavengers were the most likely authors. Because Protoceratops is considered to have been a herding animal, another hypothesis is that members of a herd tried to pull out the already buried Protoceratops, causing the joint dislocation of limbs. However, Barsbold pointed out that there are no related traces within the overall specimen to support this latter interpretation. Lastly, he restored the course of the fight with the Protoceratops power-slamming the Velociraptor, which used its feet claws to damage the throat and belly regions and its hand claws to grasp the herbivore's head. Before their burial, the deathmatch ended up on the ground with the Velociraptor lying on its back right under the Protoceratops. After burial, either Protoceratops herd or scavengers tore off the buried Protoceratops to the left and backward, making both predator and prey to be slightly separated.

=== Daily activity ===
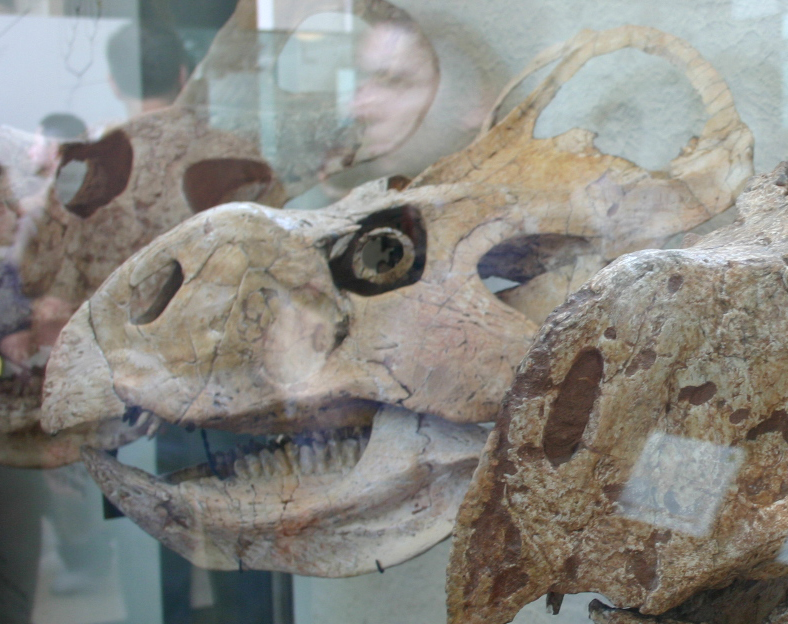
Skull of P. andrewsi AMNH 6466, preserving scleral ring

In 2010, Nick Longrich examined the relatively large orbital ratio and scleral ring of Protoceratops, which he suggested as evidence for a nocturnal lifestyle. Based on the size of its scleral ring, Protoceratops had an unusually large eyeball among protoceratopsids. In birds, a medium-sized scleral ring indicates that the animal is a predator, a large scleral ring indicates that it is nocturnal, and the largest ring size indicates it is an active nocturnal predator. Eye size is an important adaptation in predators and nocturnal animals because a larger eye ratio poses a higher sensitivity and resolution. Because of the energy necessary to maintain a larger eyeball and the weakness of the skull that corresponds with a larger orbit, Longrich argues that this structure may have been an adaptation for a nocturnal lifestyle. The jaw morphology of Protoceratops—more suitable for processing plant material—and its extreme abundance indicate it was not a predator, so if it was a diurnal animal, then it would have been expected to have a much smaller scleral ring size.

However, in 2011, Lars Schmitz and Ryosuke Motani measured the dimensions of the scleral ring and eye socket in fossil specimens of dinosaurs and pterosaurs, as well as some living species. They noted that whereas photopic (diurnal) animals have smaller scleral rings, scotopic (nocturnal) animals tend to have more enlarged rings. Mesopic (cathemeral) animals—which are irregularly active throughout the day and night—are between these two ranges. Schmitz and Motani separated ecological and phylogenetic factors and by examining 164 living species and noticed that eye measurements are quite accurate when inferring diurnality, cathemerality, or nocturnality in extinct tetrapods. The results indicated that Protoceratops was a cathemeral herbivore and Velociraptor primarily nocturnal, suggesting that the Fighting Dinosaurs deathmatch may have occurred at twilight or under low-light conditions. Lastly, Schmitz and Motani concluded that ecological niche was a potential main driver in the development of daily activity. However, a subsequent study in 2021 found that Protoceratops had a greater capability of nocturnal vision than did Velociraptor.

== Paleoenvironment ==
=== Bayan Mandahu Formation ===
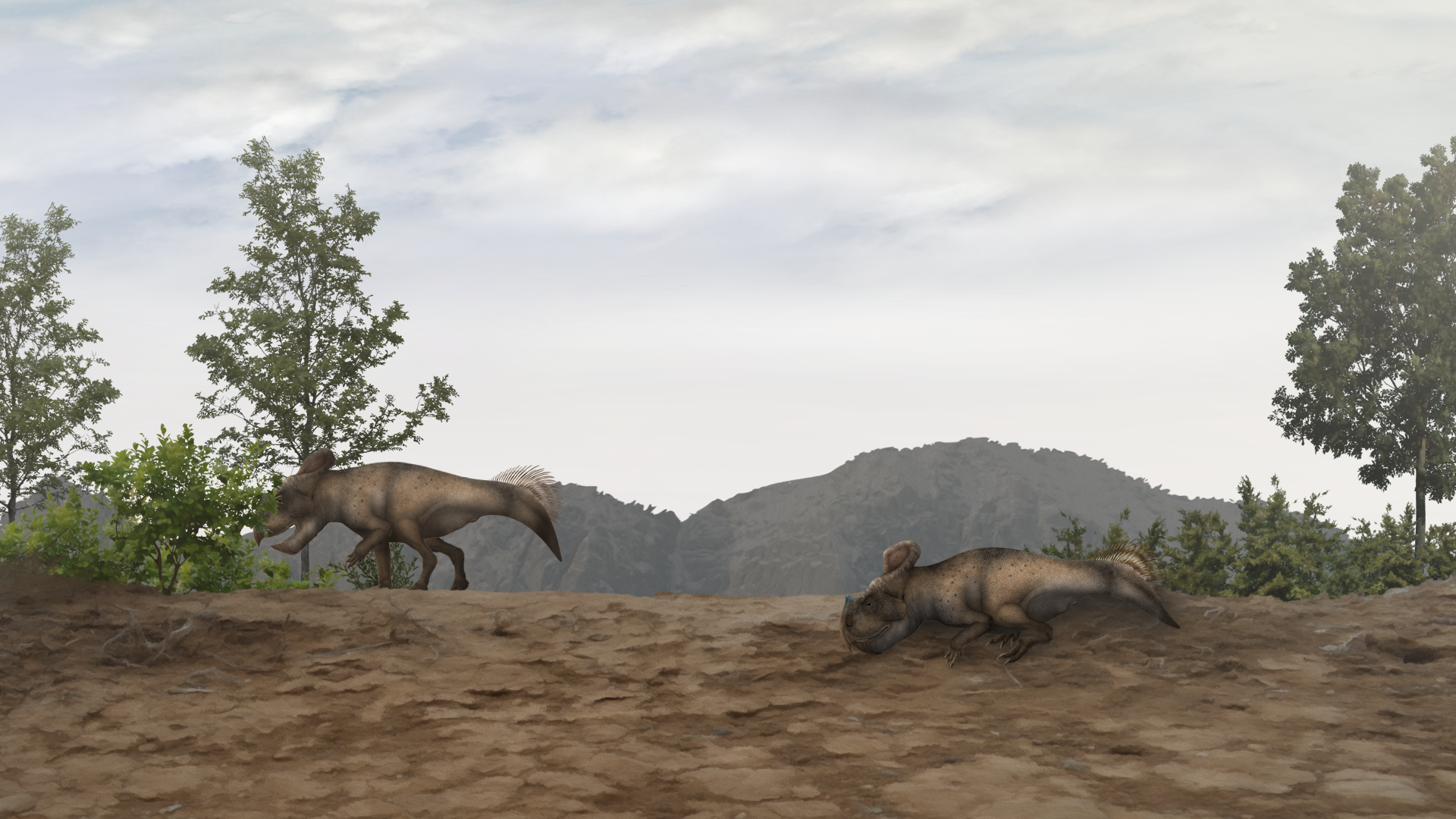
Restoration of a P. hellenikorhinus pair in the Bayan Mandahu Formation

Based on general similarities between the vertebrate fauna and sediments of Bayan Mandahu and the Djadokhta Formation, the Bayan Mandahu Formation is considered to be Late Cretaceous in age, roughly Campanian. The dominant lithology is reddish-brown, poorly cemented, fine grained sandstone with some conglomerate, and caliche. Other facies include alluvial (stream-deposited) and eolian (wind-deposited) sediments. It is likely that sediments at Bayan Mandahu were deposited by short-lived rivers and lakes on an alluvial plain (flat land consisting of sediments deposited by highland rivers) with a combination of dune field paleoenvironments, under a semi-arid climate. The formation is known for its vertebrate fossils in life-like poses, most of which are preserved in unstructured sandstone, indicating a catastrophic rapid burial.

The paleofauna of Bayan Mandahu is very similar in composition to the nearby Djadokhta Formation, with both formations sharing several of the same genera, but differing in the exact species. In this formation, P. hellenikorhinus is the representative species, and it shared its paleoenvironment with numerous dinosaurs such as dromaeosaurids Linheraptor and Velociraptor osmolskae; oviraptorids Machairasaurus and Wulatelong; and troodontids Linhevenator, Papiliovenator, and Philovenator. Other dinosaur members include the alvarezsaurid Linhenykus; ankylosaurid Pinacosaurus mephistocephalus; and closely related protoceratopsid Bagaceratops. Additional fauna from this unit comprises nanhsiungchelyids turtles, and a variety of squamates and mammals.

=== Djadokhta Formation ===
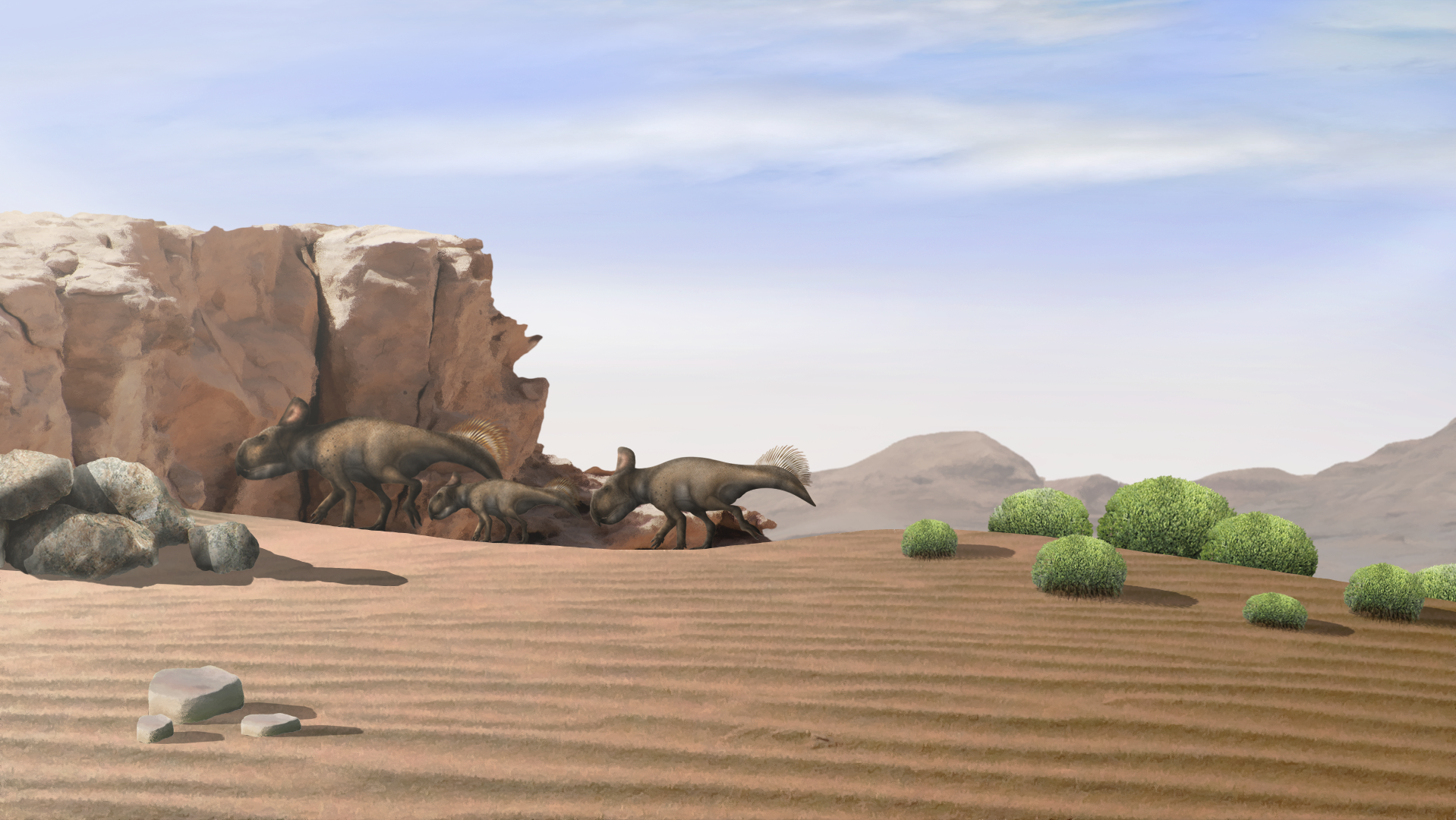
Restoration of a P. andrewsi group in the Djadokhta Formation

Protoceratops is known from most localities of the Djadokhta Formation in Mongolia, which dates back to the Late Cretaceous about 71 million to 75 million years ago, being deposited during a rapid sequence of polarity changes in the late part of the Campanian stage. Dominant sediments at Djadokhta include dominant reddish-orange and pale orange to light gray, medium to fine-grained sands and sandstones, caliche, and sparse fluvial (river-deposited) processes. Based on these components, the paleoenvironments of the Djadokhta Formation are interpreted as having a hot, semiarid climate with large dune fields/sand dunes and several short-lived water bodies, similar to the modern Gobi Desert. It is estimated that at the end of the Campanian age and into the Maastrichtian the climate would shift to the more mesic (humid/wet) conditions seen in the Nemegt Formation.

The Djadokhta Formation is separated into a lower Bayn Dzak Member and upper Turgrugyin Member. Protoceratops is largely known from both members, having P. andrewsi as a dominant and representative species in the overall formation. The Bayn Dzak member (mostly the Bayn Dzak locality) has yielded the dromaeosaurids Halszkaraptor and Velociraptor mongoliensis; oviraptorid Oviraptor; ankylosaurid Pinacosaurus grangeri; and troodontid Saurornithoides. Ukhaa Tolgod, a highly fossiliferous locality is also included in the Bayn Dzak member. and its dinosaur paleofauna is composed of alvarezsaurids Kol and Shuvuuia; ankylosaurid Minotaurasaurus; birds Apsaravis and Gobipteryx; dromaeosaurid Tsaagan; oviraptorids Citipati and Khaan; troodontids Almas and Byronosaurus; and a new, unnamed protoceratopsid closely related to Protoceratops. In the Turgrugyin Member (mainly Tugriken Shireh locality), P. andrewsi shared its paleoenvironment with the bird Elsornis; dromaeosaurids Mahakala and Velociraptor mongoliensis; and ornithomimid Aepyornithomimus. P. andrewsi is also abundant at Udyn Sayr, where Avimimus and Udanoceratops have been recovered.

The relatively low dinosaur paleodiversity, small body size of most dinosaurs, and arid settings of the Djadokhta Formation compared to those of the Nemegt Formation, suggest that Protoceratops and contemporaneous biota lived in a stressed paleoenvironment (physical factors that generate adverse impacts on the ecosystem). In addition, the high occurrence of protoceratopsid fossils in arid-deposited formations indicates that these ceratopsians preferred warm environments. Although P. andrewsi was the predominant protoceratopsid on this formation, tentative remains of P. hellenikorhinus have been reported from the Udyn Sayr and Bor Tolgoi localities, suggesting that both species co-existed. Whereas P. andrewsi is found in aeolian sediments (Bayn Dzak or Tugriken Shireh), P. hellenikorhinus is found in the aeolian-fluvial sediments. As the latter type of sediments is also found in the Bayan Mandahu Formation, it is likely that P. hellenikorhinus preferred environments combining humid and arid conditions.

=== Taphonomy ===
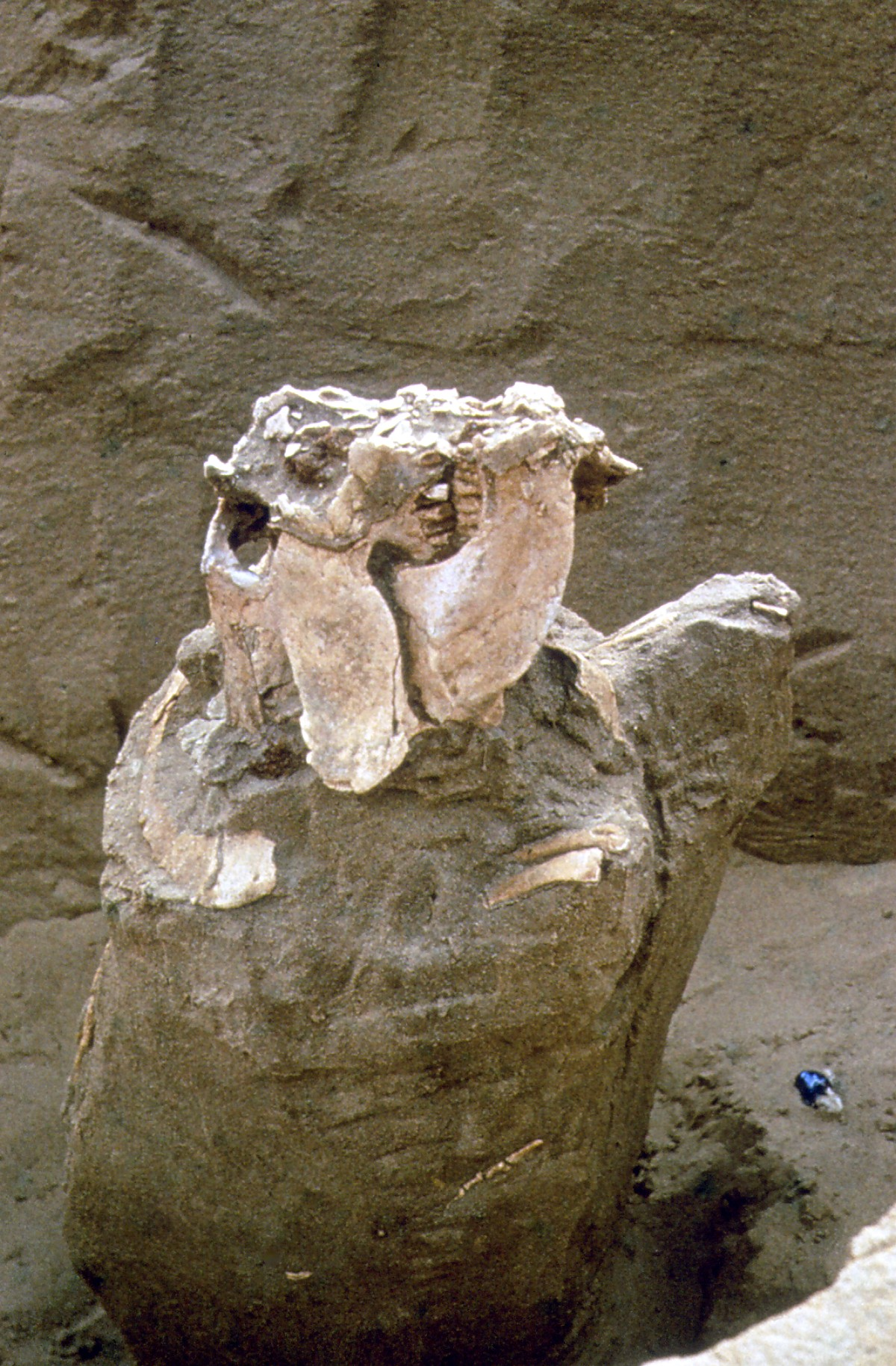
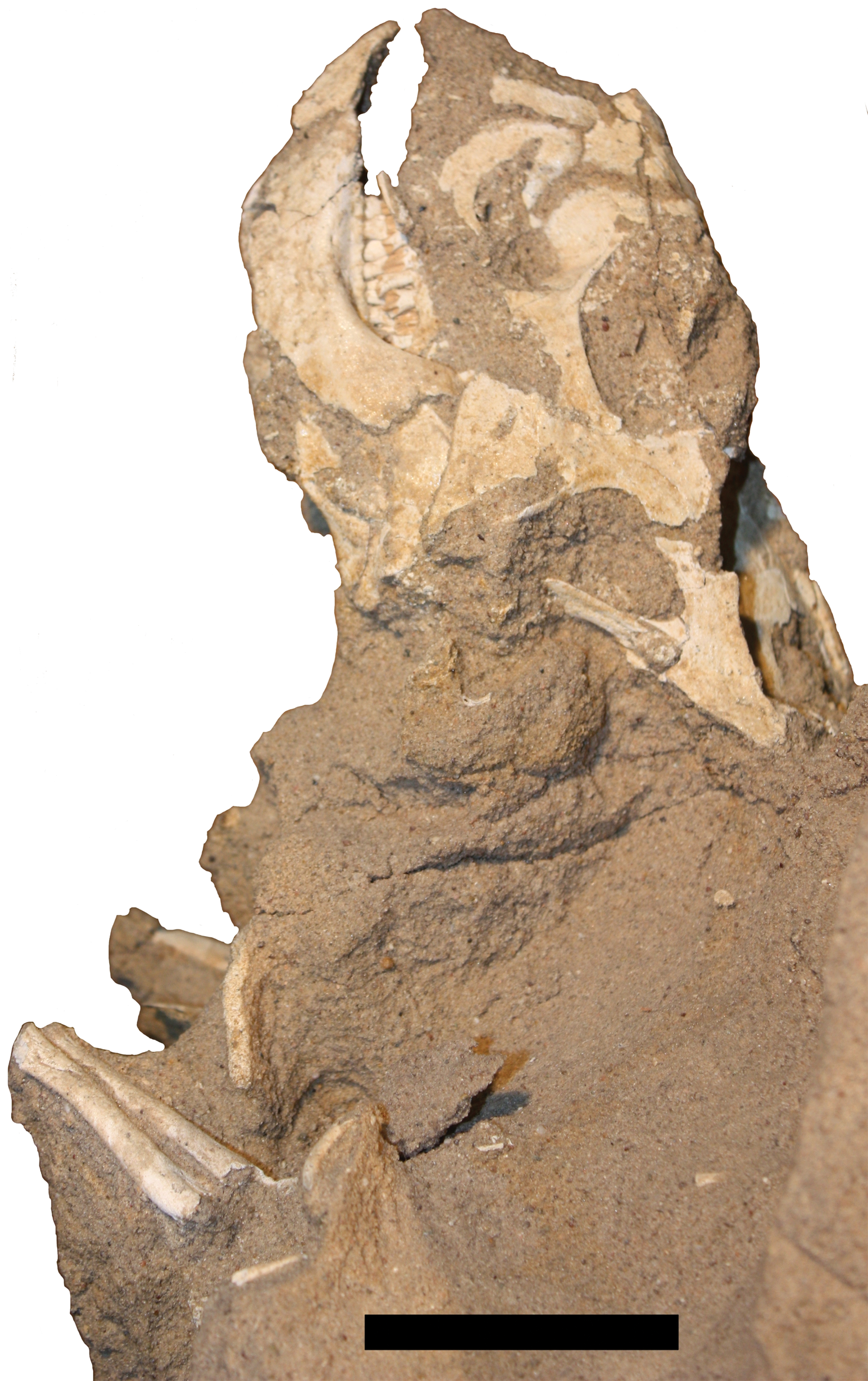
P. andrewsi individuals from Tugriken Shireh in an upwards crouched death pose; left specimen is also known as the "Standing Protoceratops"

In 1993 Jerzykiewiczz suggested that many articulated Protoceratops specimens died in the process of trying to free themselves from massive sand bodies that trapped them during sandstorms events and were not transported by environmental factors. He cited the distinctive posture of some Protoceratops involving the body and head arched upwards with forelimbs tucked in at their sides—a condition known as "standing" in particular cases—the absence of sedimentary structures in sediments preserving the individuals, and the Fighting Dinosaurs taphonomic history itself as evidence for this catastrophic preservation. Given that this posture is exhibited by populations from both Bayan Mandahu and Djadokhta formations, Jerzykiewiczz indicated that this behavior was not unique to any locality. He also considered it unlikely that these Protoceratops individuals died after burying themselves in the sand given that these specimens are only found in structureless sandstones; an arched posture would pose hard breathing conditions; and burrowers are known to excavate headfirst and sub horizontally.

Fastovsky in 1997 examined the geology at Tugriken Shireh providing insights into the taphonomy of Protoceratops. He agreed in that the preservation of Protoceratops specimens indicate that they underwent a catastrophic event such as desert storms, and carcasses were not relocated by scavengers or environmental factors. Several isolated burrows found in sediments at this locality have also been reported penetrating in the bone surface of some buried Protoceratops individuals. Fastovsky pointed out these two factors combined indicate that this site was host to high biotic activity, mainly composed of arthropod scavengers who were also involved in the recycling of Protoceratops carcasses. The flexed position of most buried Protoceratops is indicative of desiccation and shrinking of ligaments/tendons in the legs, necks, and tails after death.

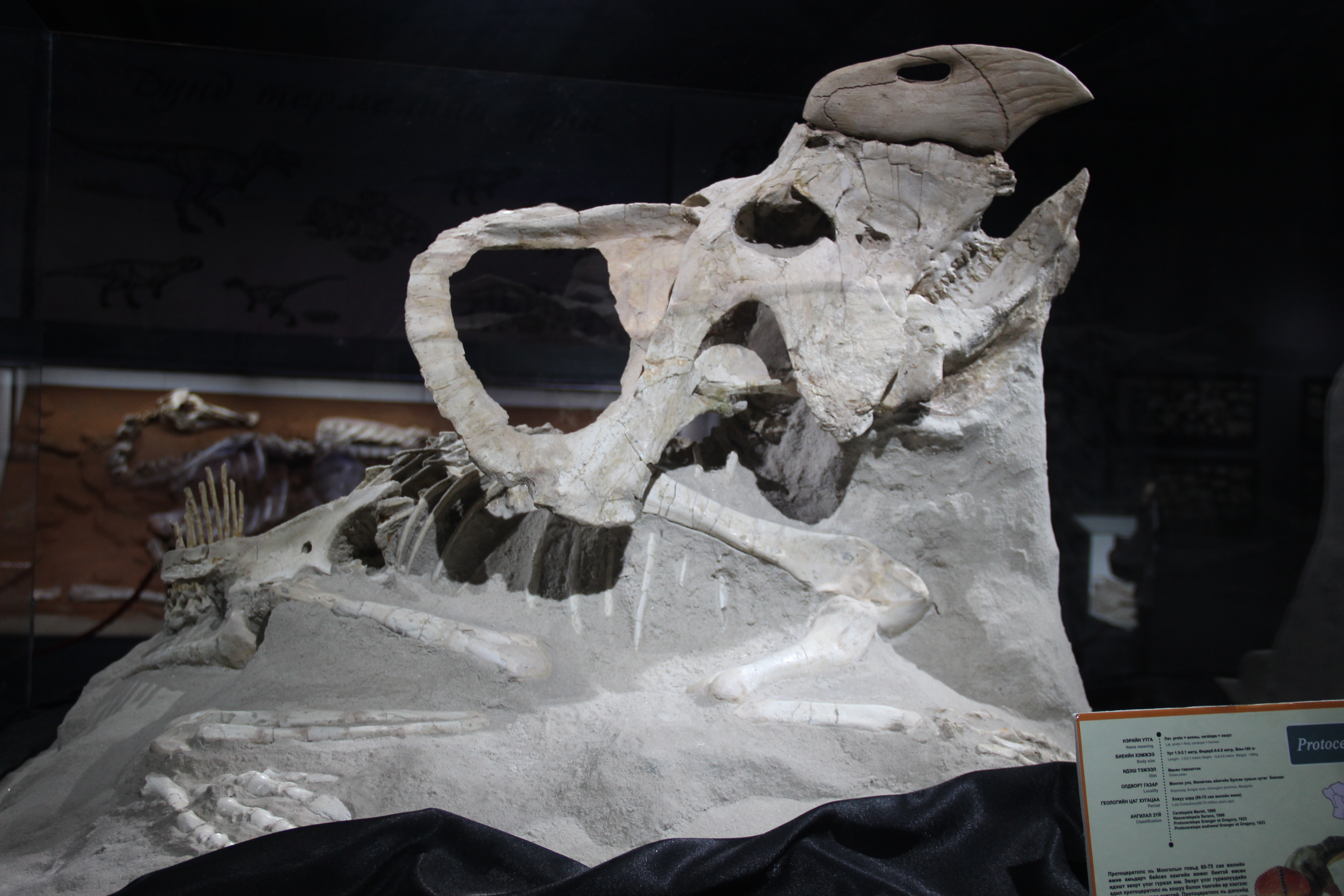
Cast of the Fox site Protoceratops, a largely bored P. andrewsi (note reconstructed rostrum)

In 1998 during a conference abstract at the Society of Vertebrate Paleontology, James I. Kirkland and team reported multiple arthropod pupae casts and borings (tunnels) on a largely articulated Protoceratops specimen from Tugriken Shireh, found in 1997. A notorious amount of pupae were found in clusters and singly along the bone surfaces, mostly in the joint areas, where the trace makers would have feed on dried ligaments, tendons and cartilage. The examined pupae from the specimen are more cylindrical structures with rounded ends. The pupae found in this Protoceratops individual were reported as measuring as much a 2.5 cm (25 mm) long and 1 cm (10 mm) wide and compare best with pupae attributed to solitary wasps. Additionally, the reported borings have a structure that differs from traces made by dermestid beetles. The team indicated that both pupae and boring traces reflect a marked ecological relationship between dinosaur carcasses and a relatively large necrophagous insect taxon.

Later in 2010, Kirkland and Kenneth Bader redescribed and discussed the numerous feeding traces from this Protoceratops specimen, which they nicknamed Fox Site Protoceratops. They found at least three types of feeding traces on this individual; nearly circular borings—which they found instead to correlate best with feeding traces made by dermestid beetles—of 0.6–1 cm (6.0–10.0 mm) in diameter; semicircular shaped notches at the edge of bones; and destruction of articular surfaces, mostly at the joints of the limbs. The co-workers also noted that the Fox Site Protoceratops preserves associated traces in the encasing sediment, indicative of necrophagous activity after the animal was buried. Kirkland and Bader concluded that adults of a large beetle taxon would detect decaying carcasses buried below the sand and dig down to feed and lay their eggs. After emerging from the eggs, larvae would have fed on the carcass prior to pupating. The last larvae to emerge would have feed on the dried tendons and cartilage in the joint areas—thereby explaining the notorious poor preservation of these areas in the specimen—and subsequently chewing on the bone itself, prior to pupating. After reaching full maturity, adult beetles would have then dig back to the surface, most likely leaving borings through bones, and finally beginning to search for new carcasses and thus continuing the recycling of Protoceratops carcasses.

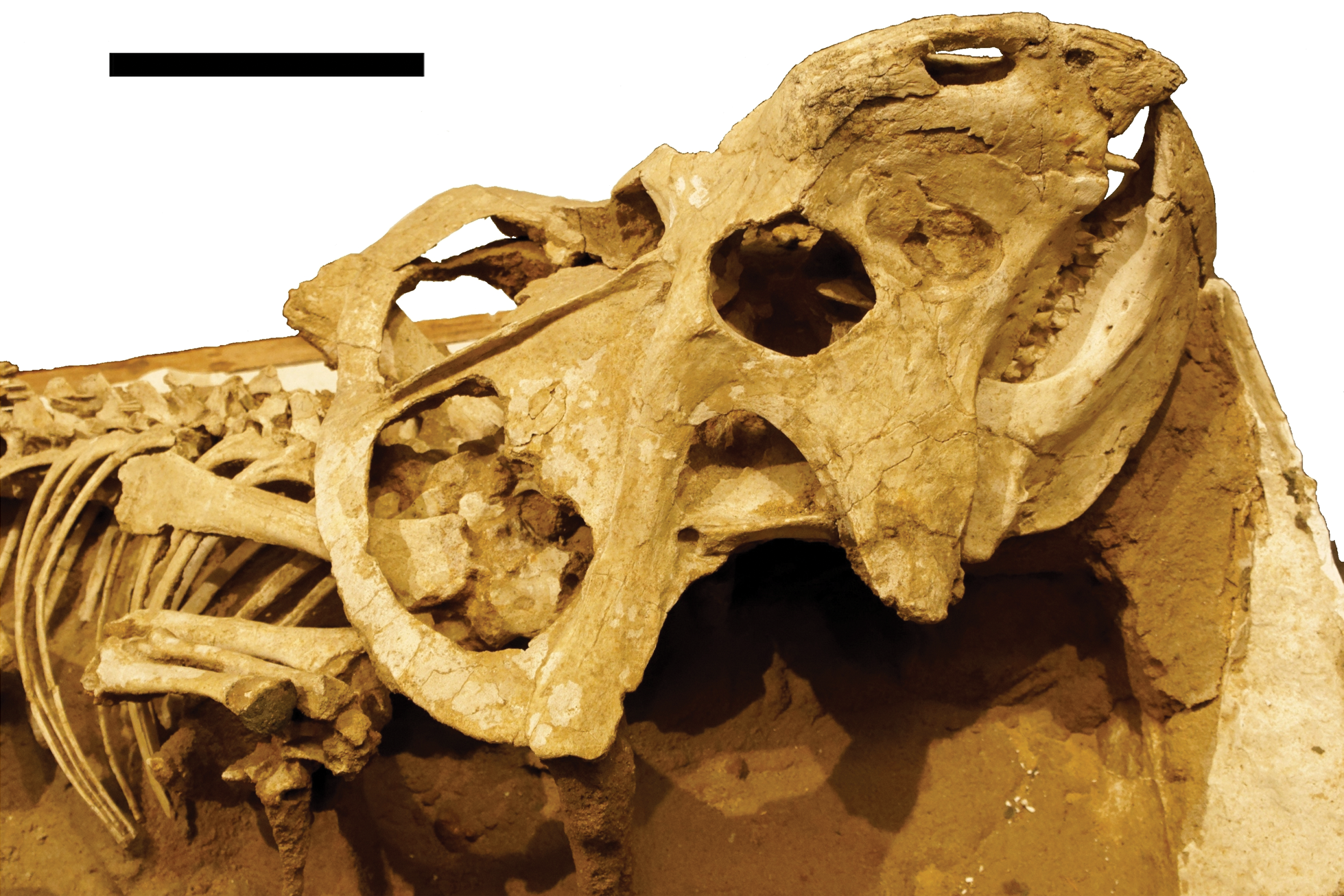
P. andrewsi specimen MPC-D 100/534; note borings on the rostrum

In 2010 the paleontologists Yukihide Matsumoto and Mototaka Saneyoshi reported multiple borings and bite traces on joint areas of articulated Bagaceratops and Protoceratops specimens from the Tugriken Shireh locality of the Djadokhta Formation and Hermiin Tsav locality of the Barun Goyot Formation, respectively. They interpreted the damaged areas in the Protoceratops specimen as product of active feeding by burrowing arthropods, most likely insects. These specimens were formally described and discussed in 2011 by Saneyoshi and team, including fossils from Velociraptor and an ankylosaurid. Reported traces were identified as pits, notches, borings, and channels across the skeletons, most notably at limb joint areas. The team indicated that it is very likely that these were made by scavenging insects, however, relatively large borings (about 3 cm (30 mm) wide) in the ribs and scapulae of one Protoceratops specimen (MPC-D100/534) indicates that insects were not the only scavengers involved in the bone damage, but also mammals. Given the dry/harsh paleoenvironmental conditions of units like the Djadokhta Formation, medium to large-sized dinosaur carcasses may have been an important source of nutrition for small animals. Saneyoshi and team emphasized that the high frequency of feeding traces at the limb joints of numerous specimens and reports of previous studies, indicates that small animals may have targeted the collagen found in the joint cartilage of dried dinosaur carcasses as a source of nitrogen, which was low in the desert-dry conditions of these dinosaur fossils.

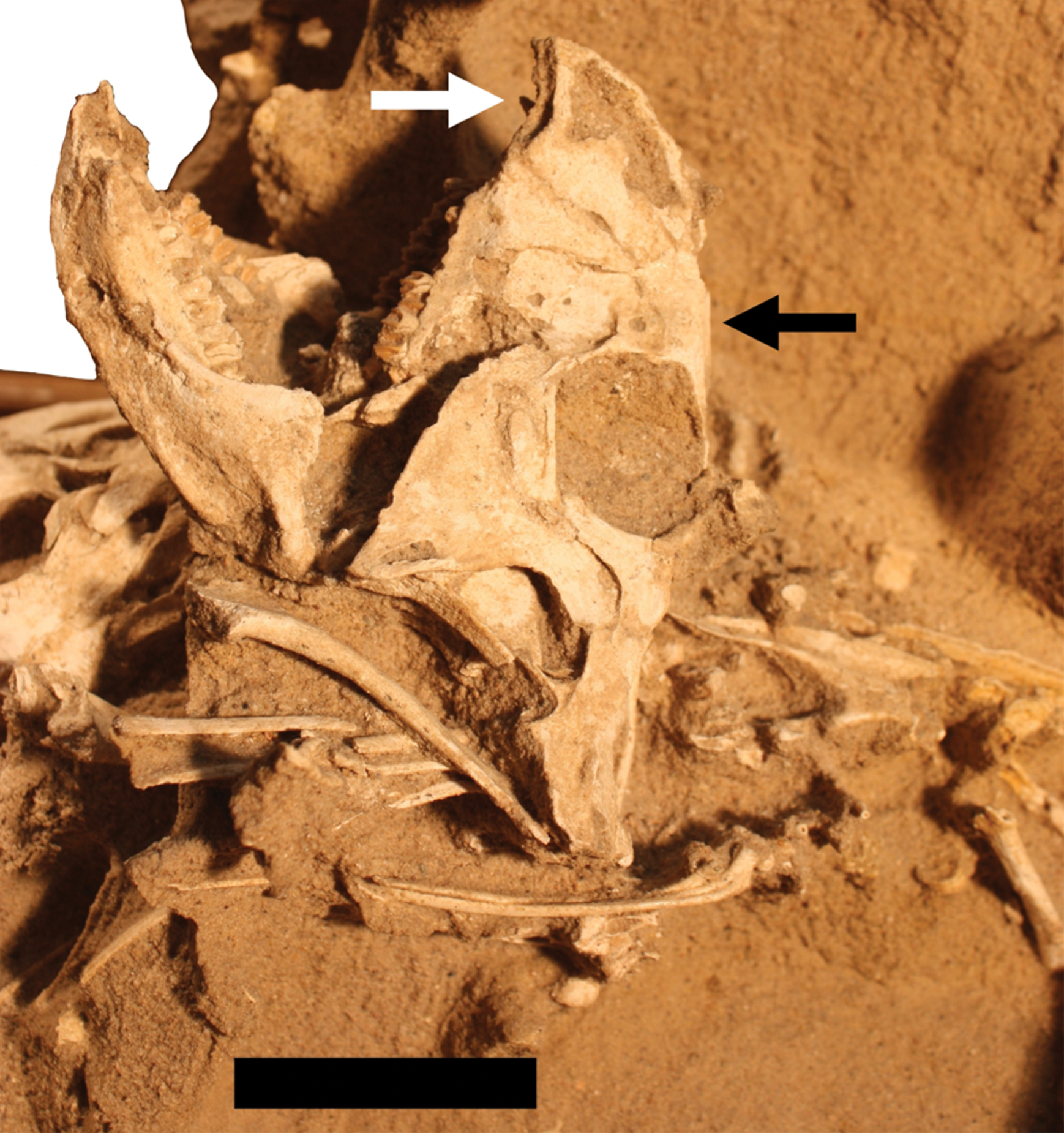
Juvenile from MPC-D 100/526; black arrow points to larvae borings

In 2011 Fastovsky with colleagues concluded that the juveniles within the nest MPC-D 100/530 were rapidly overwhelmed by a strong sand-bearing event and entombed alive. The sediments of the nest suggest a deposition through a dune-shift or strong sandstorms, and the orientation of the individuals indicates that sediments were brought from a prevailing west-southwest wind. Most individuals are preserved with their forelimbs splayed and hindlimbs are extended, an arrangement that suggests that young Protoceratops tried to push against the powerful airstream in the initially loose sand. Prior to or during burial, some may have tried to climb on top of others. Because it is generally accepted that most fossil specimens at Tugriken Shireh were preserved by rapidly migrating dunes and sandstorms, Fastovsky with colleagues suggested that the lee side borders of the nest would have been the area where air was sand-free and consequently, all young Protoceratops may have struggled to reach this area, resulting in their final burial and eventual death.

Hone and colleagues in 2014 indicated that two assemblages of Protoceratops at Tugriken Shireh (MPC-D 100/526 and 100/534) suggest that individuals died simultaneously, rather than accumulating over time. For instance, the block of four juveniles preserves the individuals with near-identical postures, spatial positions, and all of them have their heads facing upwards, which indicates that they were alive at the time of burial. During burial, the animals were most likely not completely restricted in their movements at all, given that the individuals of MPC-D 100/526 are in relatively normal life positions and have not been disturbed. At least two individuals within this block are preserved with their arms at a level above the legs, suggestive of attempts of trying to move upwards with the purpose of free themselves. The team also noted the presence of borings on the skulls and skeletons of both assemblages, and these may have been produced by insect larvae after the animals died.

In 2016 Meguru Takeuchi and team reported numerous fossilized feeding traces preserved on skeletons of Protoceratops from the Bayn Dzak, Tugriken Shireh, and Udyn Sayr localities, and also from other dinosaurs. Preserved traces were reported as pits, notches, borings, and tunnels, which they attributed to scavengers. The diameter of the feeding traces preserved on a Protoceratops skull from Bayn Dzak was bigger than traces reported among other specimens, indicating that the scavengers responsible for these traces were notoriously different from other trace makers preserved on specimens.

== Cultural significance ==
=== Possible Influence on Griffin Legend ===
The folklorist and historian of science Adrienne Mayor of Stanford University has suggested that the exquisitely preserved fossil skeletons of Protoceratops, Psittacosaurus and other beaked dinosaurs, found by ancient Scythian nomads who mined gold in the Tian Shan and Altai Mountains of Central Asia, may have played a role in the image of the mythical creature known as the griffin. Griffins were described as wolf- or lion-sized quadrupeds with large claws and a raptor-bird-like beak; they laid their eggs in nests on the ground.

Dodson in 1996 pointed out Greek writers began describing the griffin around 675 B.C., at the time the first Greek writings about Scythia nomads appeared, although contact with Scythian nomads would have occurred earlier, in the Bronze Age when Greeks imported tin from Afghanistan, transported on the caravan routes across the Gobi and other deserts. Griffins were described as "guarding" the gold deposits in the arid hills and red sandstone formations of the wilderness below the Tien Shan and Altai mountains. The region of Mongolia and China, where many Protoceratops and other dinosaur fossils are found, is rich in placer gold runoff from the neighboring mountains, lending some credence to the theory that these fossils played a role in griffin descriptions of the seventh century BC to Roman times.

Mayor in 2001 and 2011 refined the hypothesis of Protoceratops as an influence on the griffin legend by analyzing written details and artistic imagery. She also cited some other Greek histories about mythological creatures may have been influenced by fossil discoveries by ancient people, such as cyclopes and giants.

In 2016 this hypothesis was criticized by the British paleontologist and paleoartist Mark P. Witton, as it ignores pre-Greek "griffin art and accounts." (No written accounts of griffins are known before ca 675 BC, when the word gryps/griffin is first attested.) Witton goes on to point out that the wings of traditional griffins are positioned above the shoulder blades, not behind the neck as the frills of Protoceratops, that the bodies of griffins much more closely resemble the bodies of modern big cats than they do those of Protoceratops, and that the gold deposits of central Asia occur hundreds of kilometers from the known Protoceratops fossil remains, among many other inconsistencies. It is simpler, he argues, to understand the griffin as a mythical combination of well-known extant animal species than as an ancient misunderstanding of fossilized collections of bones. Witton later co-published with Richard Hing a 2024 paper expanding on his points regarding the tenuous link between griffins and Protoceratops.

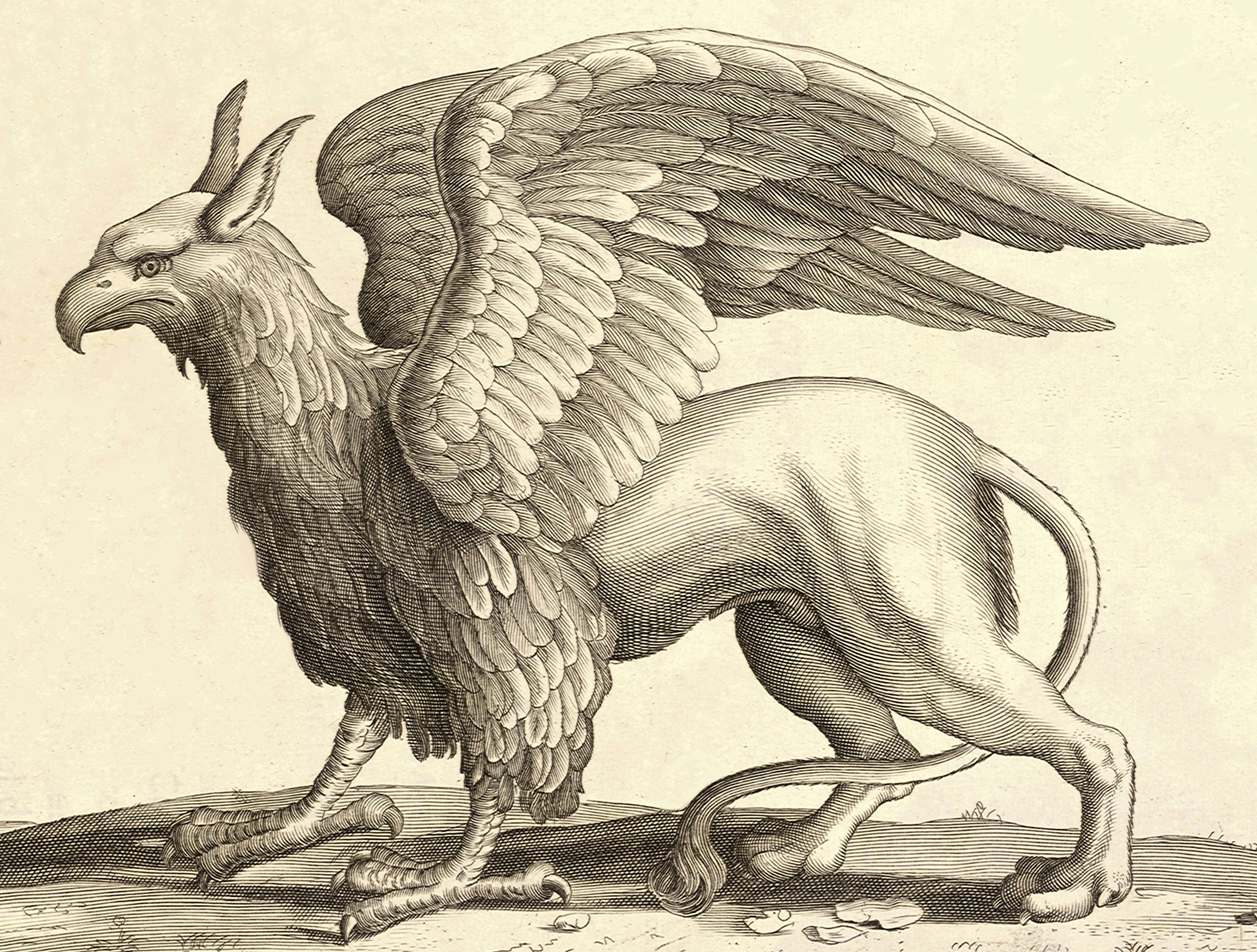
A traditional depiction of the griffin

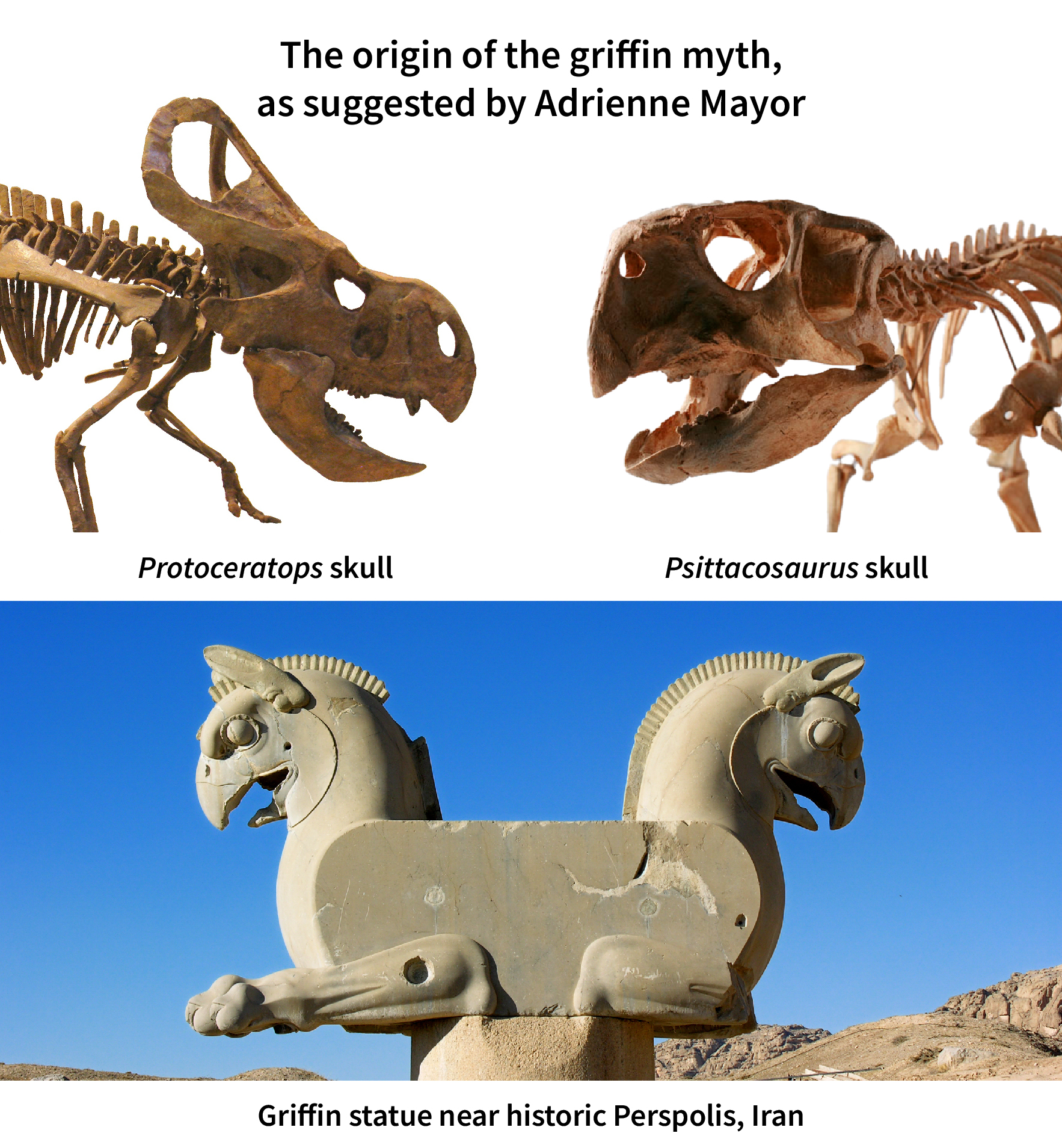
Adrienne Mayor has speculated that the discovery of Protoceratops fossils may have inspired or influenced stories of griffins

== See also ==
- List of dinosaur specimens with documented taphonomic histories
- Timeline of ceratopsian research
