= Timeline of ceratopsian research =

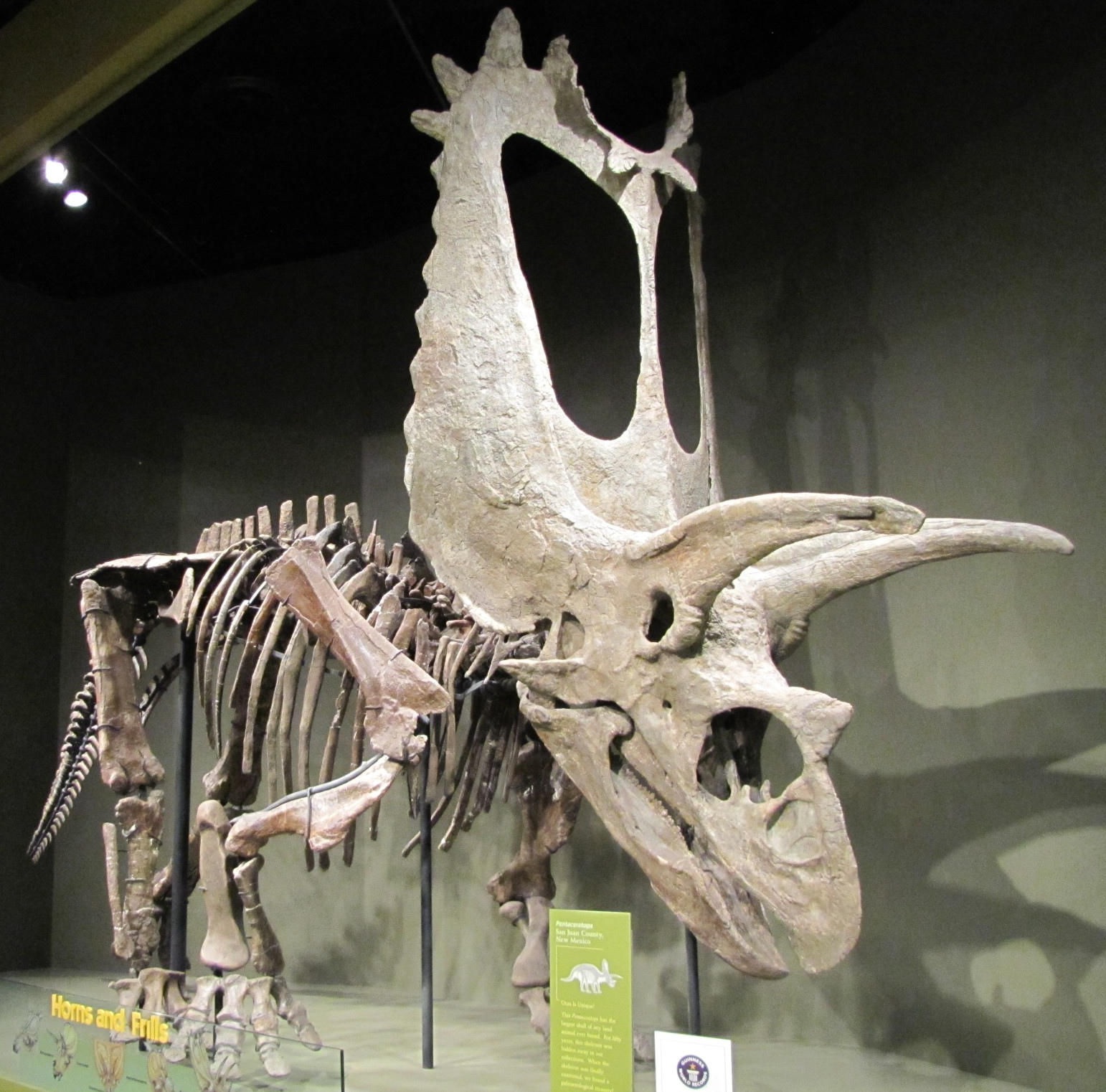
Skeletal mount of Titanoceratops

This timeline of ceratopsian research is a chronological listing of events in the history of paleontology focused on the ceratopsians, a group of herbivorous marginocephalian dinosaurs that evolved parrot-like beaks, bony frills, and, later, spectacular horns. The first scientifically documented ceratopsian fossils were described by Edward Drinker Cope starting in the 1870s; however, the remains were poorly preserved and their true nature was not recognized. Over the next several decades, Cope named several such genera and species. Cope's hated rival, Othniel Charles Marsh, also described ceratopsian remains. In 1887, Marsh mistook a Triceratops horn for one belonging to a new species of prehistoric Bison. Marsh also named the eponymous genus Ceratops in 1888. The next year, he named the most famous ceratopsian, Triceratops horridus. It was the discovery of Triceratops that illuminated the ceratopsian body plan, and he formally named the Ceratopsia in 1890.

The early 20th century was a fruitful time for ceratopsian research. In 1907, Hatcher and others published a monograph on ceratopsid anatomy that is still considered the single most significant publication on the topic to date. Many new species were being described, including Centrosaurus, Styracosaurus, and Chasmosaurus. Not long after, the Central Asiatic Expedition led by Roy Chapman Andrews of the American Museum of Natural History discovered the primitive ceratopsians Psittacosaurus and Protoceratops in Mongolia. Protoceratops gained notoriety as the supposed parent of the first fossil dinosaur eggs known to science. One of these supposed Protoceratops nests preserved the skeleton of a new kind of theropod dinosaur, Oviraptor. It was thought to have been preserved after being killed in the act of raiding the Protoceratops nest. This narrative would last until the 1990s, when the "Protoceratops" eggs were determined to belong to Oviraptor itself.

Throughout the rest of the century, paleontologists would be occupied with several controversies regarding ceratopsian paleobiology. One concerned the stance of the ceratopsid forelimbs. When Marsh first reconstructed the ceratopsid forelimb, he portrayed it in an erect posture. However, when later researchers like Sternberg and Osborn tried to mount the skeletons, they found that the forelimb bones apparently sprawled despite the hindlimbs standing straight up and down. Later researchers like Robert T. Bakker and Gregory S. Paul attempted to revive the erect reconstruction, but continuing research in the 1990s by researchers like John Ostrom, Peter Dodson, and James Farlow found an intermediate value to be better supported.

The original use of the ceratopsids' horns and frills was another long-running controversy in ceratopsian paleontology. Early researchers like Richard Swann Lull thought that bony frills served as the attachment site for enlarged jaw muscles. This explanation was followed by researchers like Russell, Haas, and Ostrom. Sternberg thought the horns of ceratopsians helped defend against predators. In 1961, Davitashvili proposed that ceratopsids used their horns and frills to compete over mates. Farlow and Dodson arrived at the same conclusion in the 1970s, and were followed by Ralph Molnar. Ostrom, who had previously followed the jaw musculature interpretation, came to support this view in 1986. The idea gained further support in the 1990s from researchers like Forster and Sampson.

== 19th century ==
=== 1870s ===
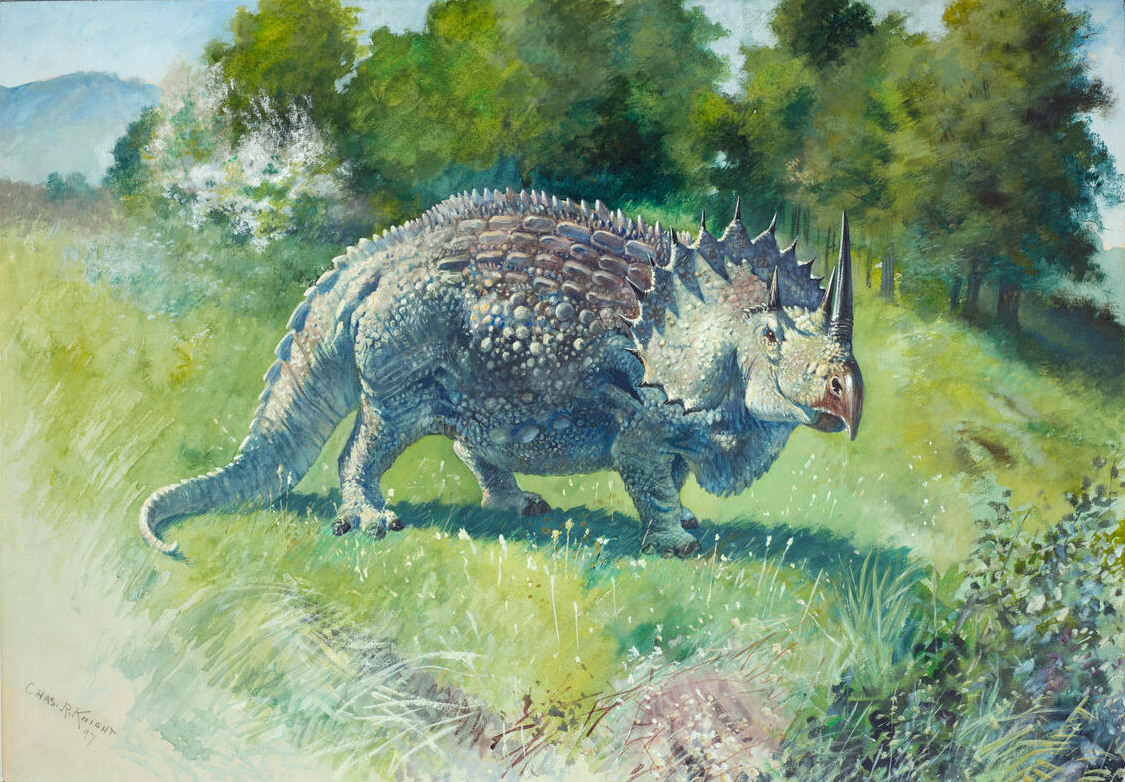
Charles Knight's restoration of "Agathaumas sphenocerus" (a dubious species originally described as Monoclonius sphenocerus)

==== 1872 ====
- Edward Drinker Cope described the new genus and species Agathaumas sylvestris.
- Cope described the new genus and species Polyonax mortuarius.

==== 1876 ====
- Cope described the new genus and species Monoclonius crassus, Dysganus bicarinatus, D. encaustus, D. haydenianus, and Dysganus peiganus. He also described the new species Monoclonius fissus.

==== 1878 ====
- William Edmund Cutler was born in England.

=== 1880s ===
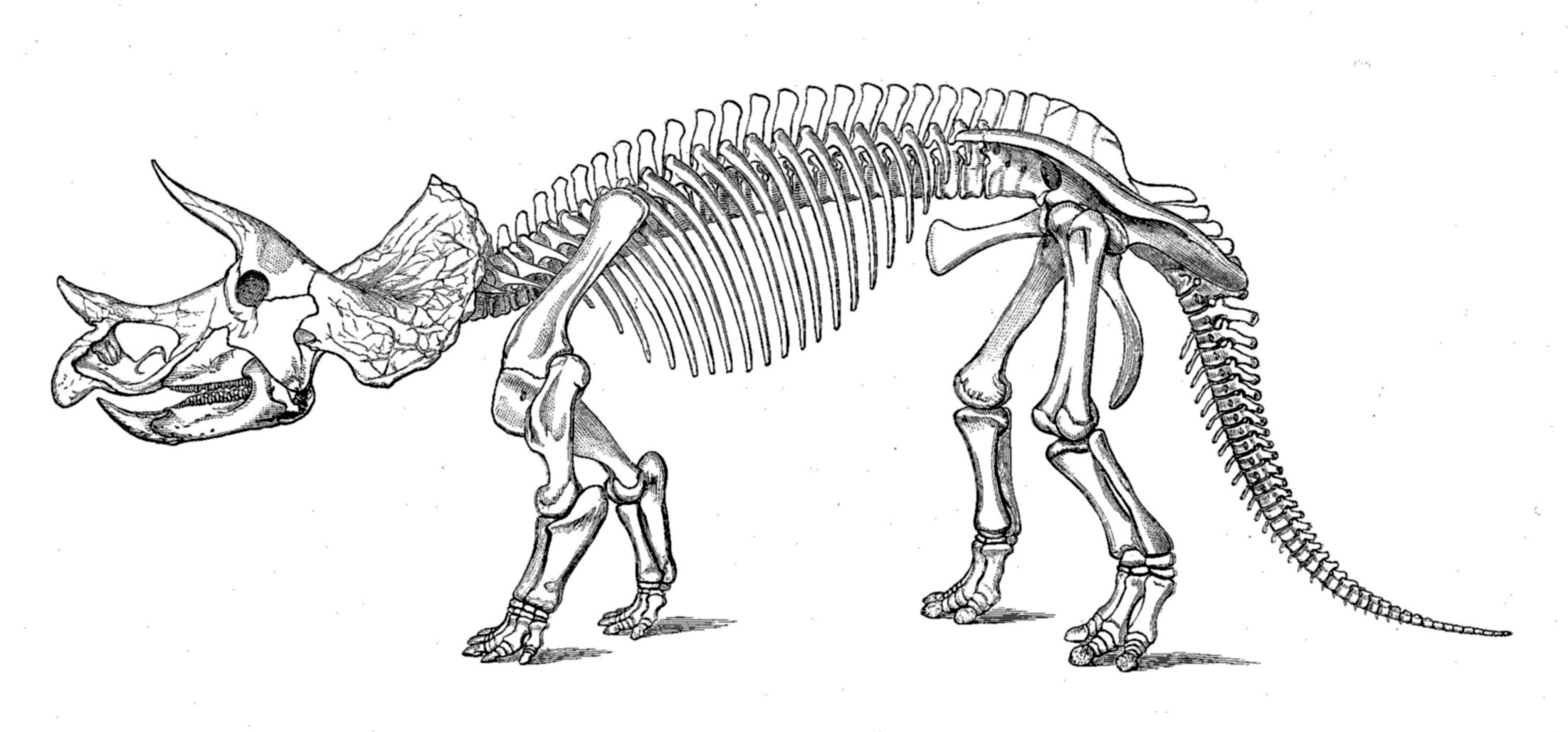
Marsh's reconstruction of Triceratops

==== 1887 ====
- Despite the description of several ceratopsid taxa by Cope, science still had no concept of what these animals were like due to the scrappy quality of the fossils. Othniel Charles Marsh described the new species Bison alticornis based on horn cores from the animal he would later name Triceratops, not recognizing their dinosaurian origins.

==== 1888 ====
- Marsh described the new genus species Ceratops montanus.

==== 1889 ====
- Marsh described the new species Ceratops horridus. Marsh erected the new genus Triceratops to house the species Ceratops horridus. The fossils included the first complete ceratopsid skull to be scientifically documented.
- Marsh described the new species Triceratops flabellatus.
- Marsh described the new species Triceratops galeus.
- Cope described the new species Monoclonius recurvicornis and M. sphenocerus.

=== 1890s ===
==== 1890 ====
- Marsh named the Ceratopsia. He also named the Ceratopsidae.
- Marsh described the new species Triceratops prorsus.

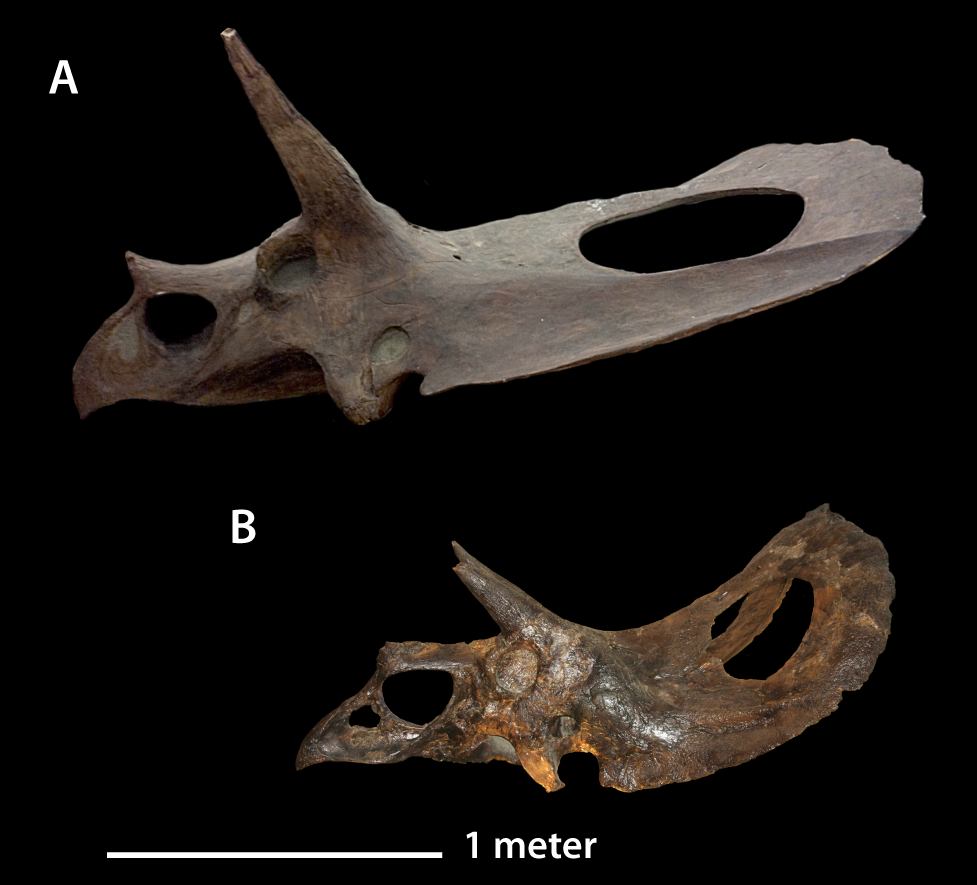
Skull from the type specimen of Torosaurus (top). Skull of a young adult below.

- Marsh described the new species Triceratops serratus.
- Marsh described the new species Triceratops sulcatus.
- Marsh described the new genus and species Torosaurus latus.

==== 1891 ====
- Marsh described the new species Torosaurus gladius.
- Marsh described the new species Triceratops elatus.
- Marsh erected the new genus Sterrholophus.
- Marsh reconstructed Triceratops with both its fore and hindlimbs held with erect posture.

==== 1896 ====
- Barnum Brown discovered a Triceratops skull in Wyoming. It was the first dinosaur fossil Brown ever discovered.

==== 1898 ====
- Marsh described the new species Triceratops calicornis.
- Marsh described the new species Triceratops obtusus.

== 20th century ==
=== 1900s ===
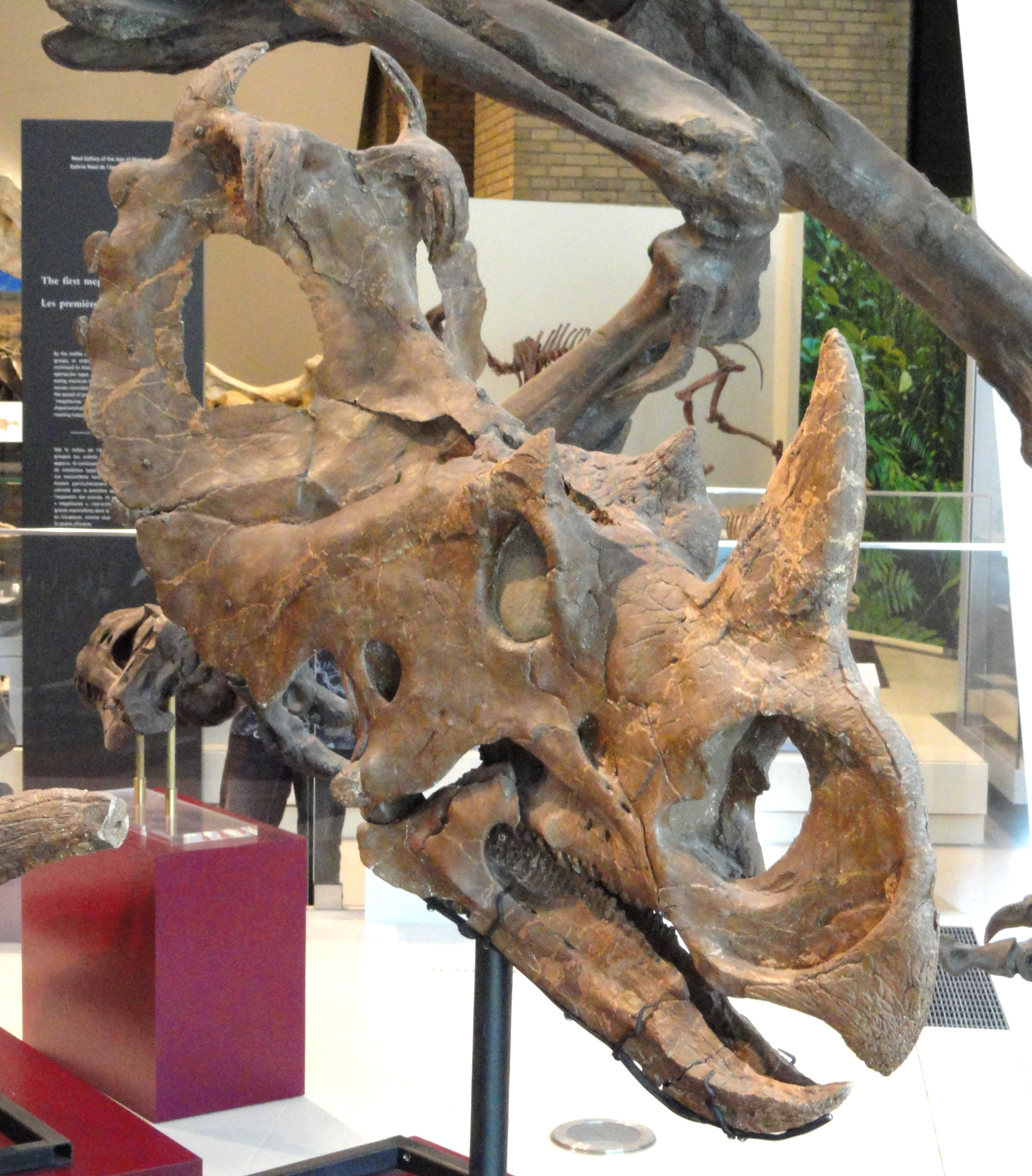
Centrosaurus apertus specimen ROM 767 on exhibit in the Royal Ontario Museum, Toronto, Canada

==== 1901 ====
- William Temple Hornaday discovered some Triceratops fossils in Montana. These were the first Triceratops fossils to ever be discovered in the Hell Creek Formation.

==== 1902 ====
- Lawrence Lambe described the new species Monoclonius dawsoni.
- Lambe described the new species Monoclonius belli.
- Lambe described the new species Monoclonius canadensis.
- Barnum Brown and Richard Swann Lull set out to excavate the Triceratops discovered by Hornaday.

==== 1904 ====
- Lambe described the new genus and species Centrosaurus apertus.
- A skeletal mount for Triceratops was designed for the United States National Museum of Natural History. This was the first skeletal mounts of any ceratopsid constructed for a museum.

==== 1905 ====
- Richard Swann Lull described the new genus and species Diceratops hatcheri.
- John Bell Hatcher described the new species Triceratops brevicornus.

==== 1907 ====
- Hatcher and others published a monograph on ceratopsids. This publication has been regarded as the first comprehensive study on ceratopsids and was still regarded as "the most valuable single reference on ceratopsid anatomy" nearly a century later. The researchers classified ceratopsids into two main groups. One consisted of Monoclonius, Triceratops, and their relatives and the other consisted of Ceratops, Torosaurus and their relatives.

==== 1908 ====
- Lull interpreted ceratopsid frills as sites for the attachment of enlarged jaw muscles.

=== 1910s ===
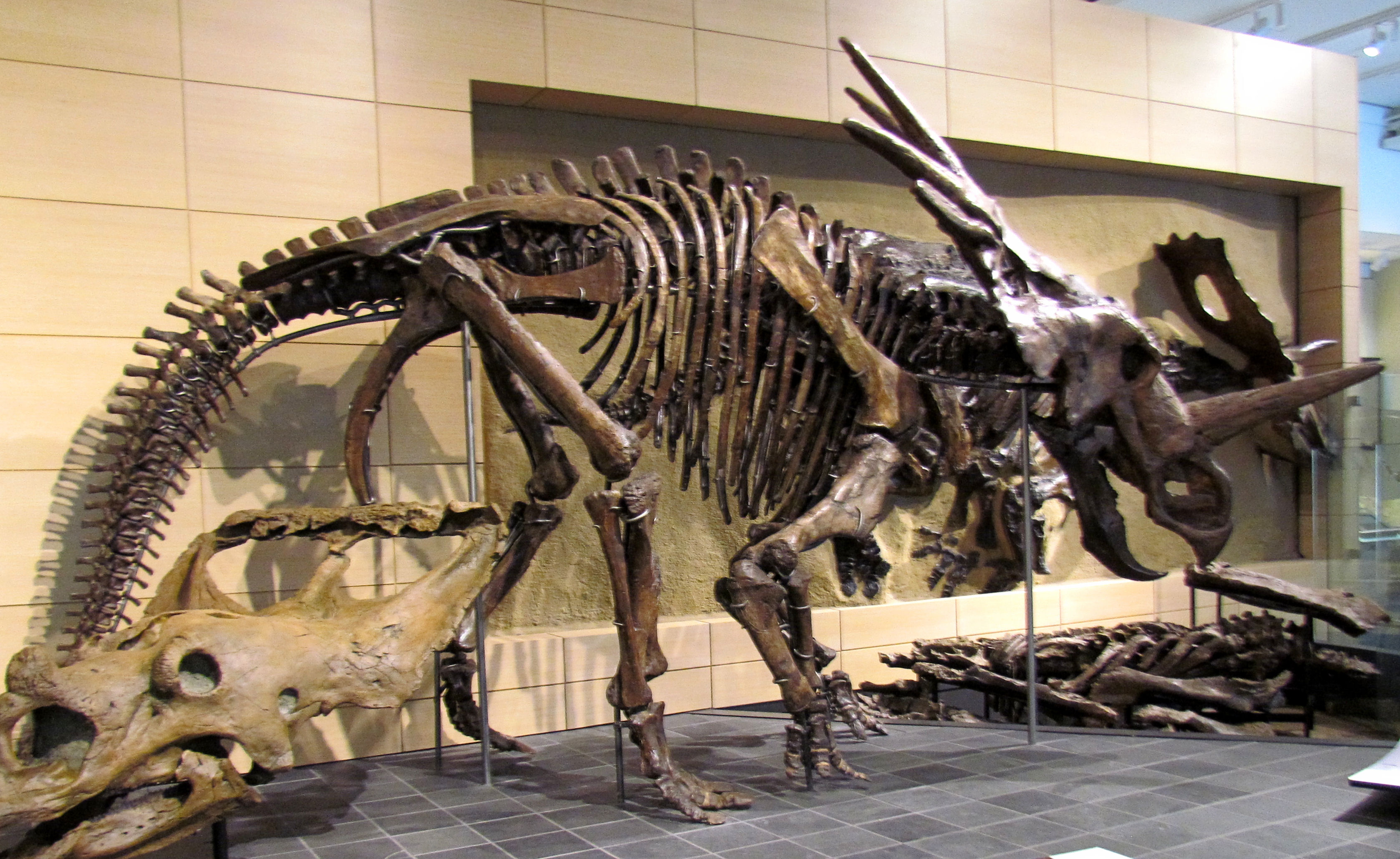
Holotype skeleton of Styracosaurus albertensis

==== 1910 ====
- An expedition led by Barnum Brown on behalf of the American Museum of Natural History discovered an isolated brainscase in the Horseshoe Canyon Formation. This find represented the first non-ceratopsid neoceratopsian remains discovered in the unit. Field photos suggest that the discovery occurred near the AMNH 5245 "Ankylosaurus" quarry.

==== 1913 ====
- Lambe described the new genus and species Styracosaurus albertensis. The frill of Styracosaurus bore three pairs of long, bony spikes, giving it a spectacular and formidable appearance.

==== 1914 ====
- Brown described the new genus and species Leptoceratops gracilis.

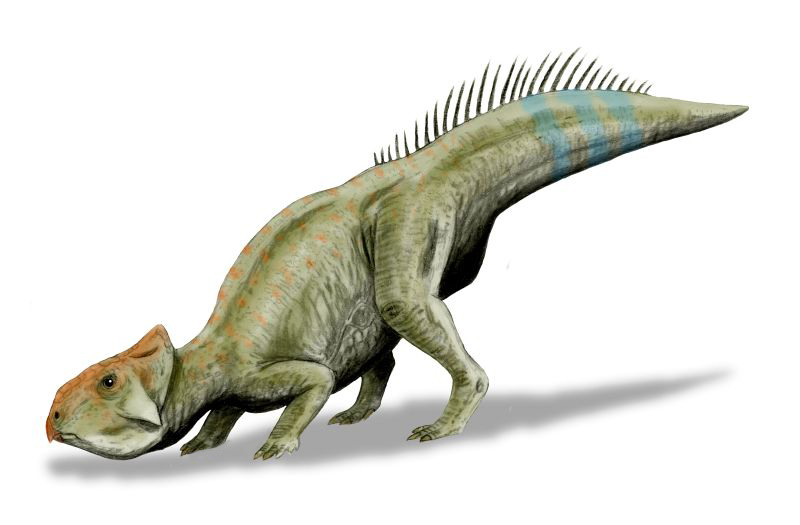
Artist's restoration of Leptoceratops

- Brown described the new genus and species Anchiceratops ornatus.
- Brown described the new species Monoclonius flexus.
- Charles Whitney Gilmore described the new species Brachyceratops montanensis.

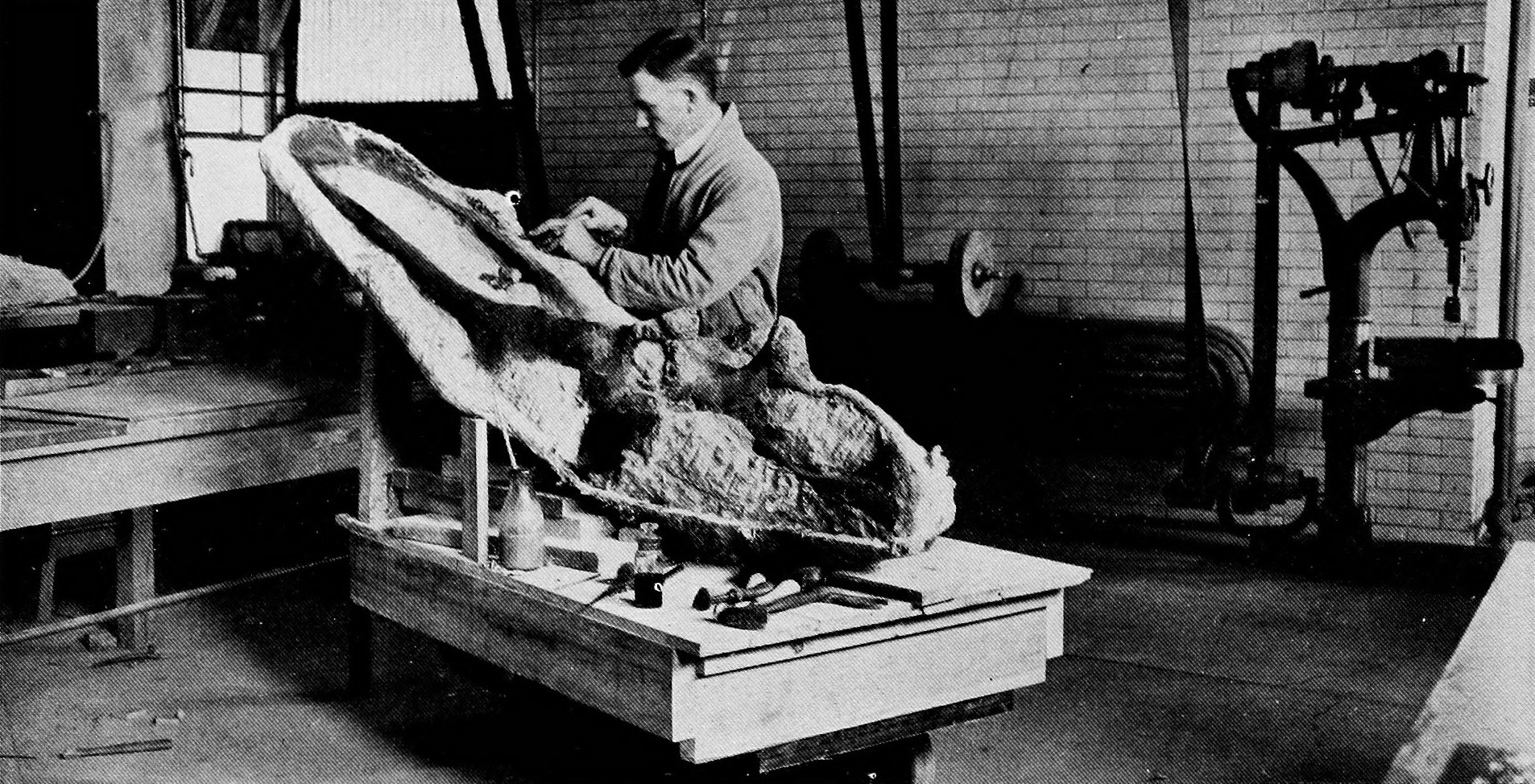
G. F. Sternberg preparing the skull of Chasmosaurus belli

- Lambe described the new genus and species Chasmosaurus belli.
- Lambe described the new genus Protorosaurus.
- Lambe reported the presence of fossilized skin in C. belli.

==== 1915 ====
- Lambe divided the Ceratopsidae into the Centrosaurinae, Chasmosaurinae, and Eoceratopsinae.
- Lambe erected the new genus Eoceratops to house the species Monoclonius canadensis.
- Lull described the new species Triceratops ingens.

==== 1917 ====
- Brown described the new species Monoclonius cutleri.
- Brown described the new species Monoclonius nasicornis.
- Brown reported fossilized skin in Monoclonius cutleri and Monoclonius nasicornis.
- Sternberg argued that ceratopsids used their horns and frills to protect themselves from predators like tyrannosaurids.

==== 1918 ====
- Tapia described the new genus and species Notoceratops bonarelli.

=== 1920s ===
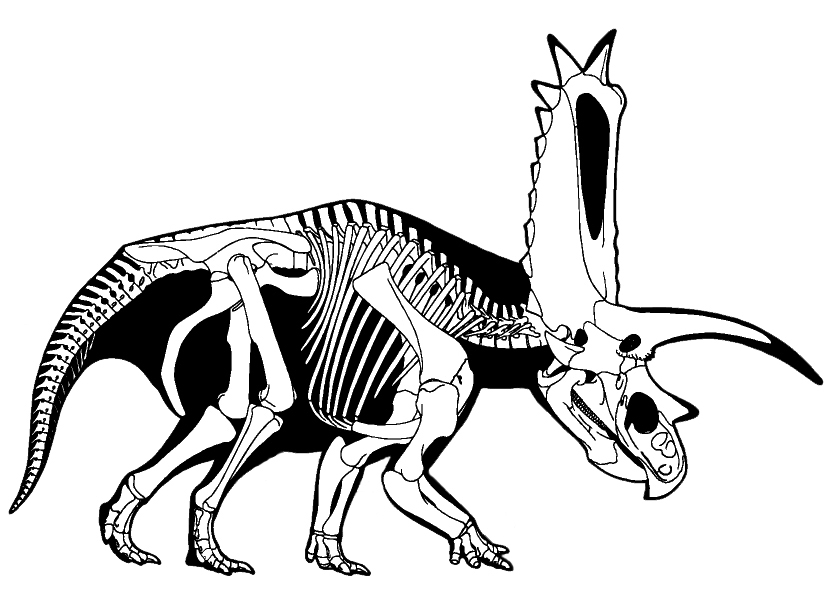
Skeletal reconstruction of Pentaceratops

==== 1922 ====
- 17 April: The Central Asiatic Expedition, led by Andrews, departed from Peking toward Mongolia.

==== 1923 ====
- Henry Fairfield Osborn named the new genus and species Psittacosaurus mongoliensis and Protiguanodon mongoliensis as well as the new family Psittacosauridae.
- Osborn named the new genus and species Pentaceratops sternbergii.
- 13 July: George Olsen, a member of the Central Asiatic Expedition led by Roy Chapman Andrews discovered fossil dinosaur eggshell at Iren Debasu, Mongolia. Expedition member Walter W. Granger realized that they must have been laid by dinosaurs. They were mistakenly thought to be the first scientifically documented dinosaur egg fossils. They attributed these eggs to the locally abundant primitive ceratopsian that they would name "Protoceratops".

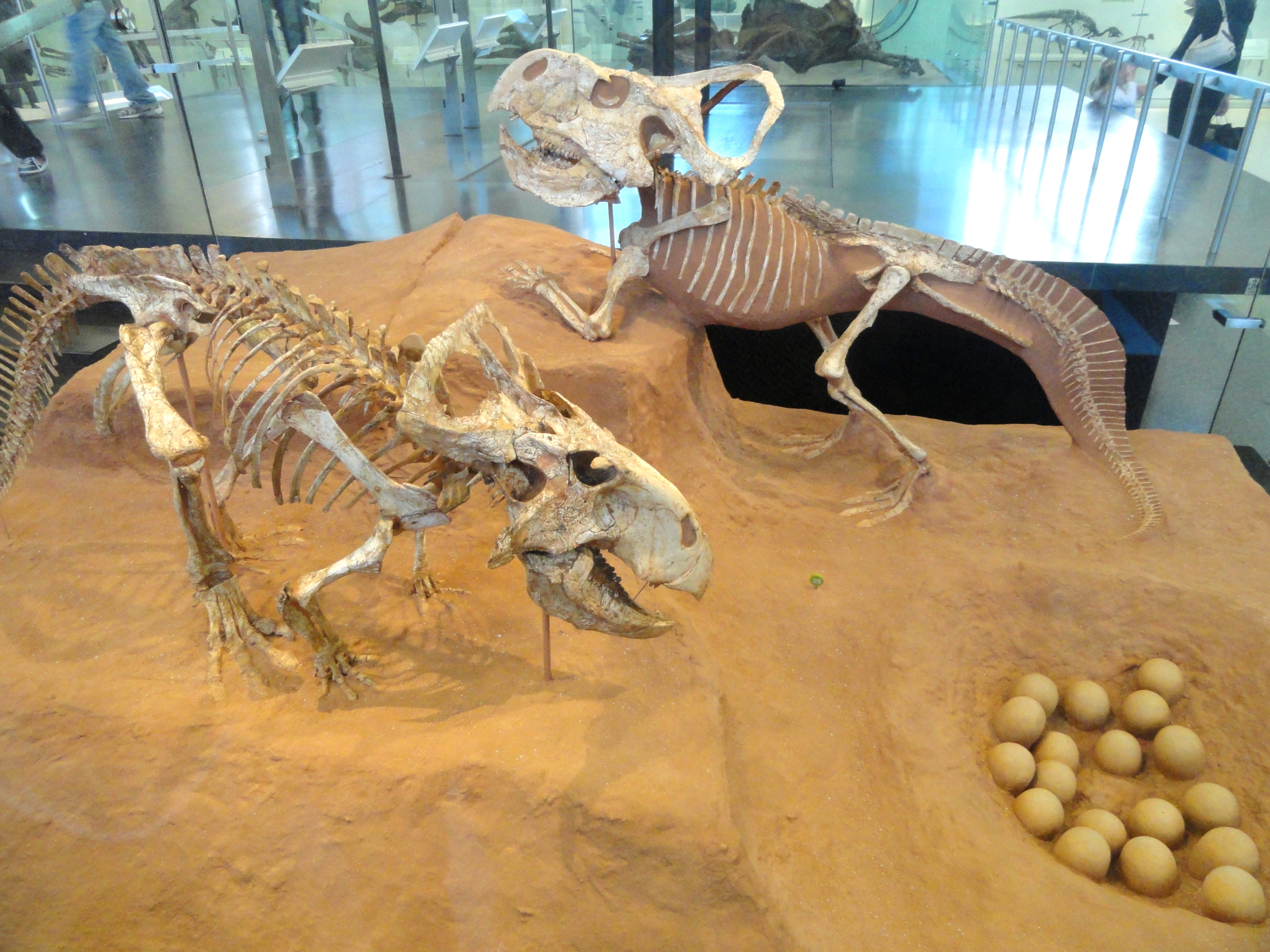
Skeletal reconstruction of two Protoceratops and a nest

- Walter W. Granger and William King Gregory described the new genus and species Protoceratops andrewsi.
- A Triceratops skeletal mount was created for the American Museum of Natural History. It was the second ceratopsid skeletal mount ever created.

==== 1924 ====
- Osborn described the new non-ceratopsian theropod dinosaur genus and species Oviraptor philoceratops. Since a specimen was found preserved on top of a nest of eggs presumed to belong to Protoceratops and its short toothless beak seemed adapted to cracking open eggs, Osborn thought that it was smothered by a sandstorm while in the act of raiding the nest.

==== 1925 ====
- William Arthur Parks described the new genus and species Arrhinoceratops brachyops.

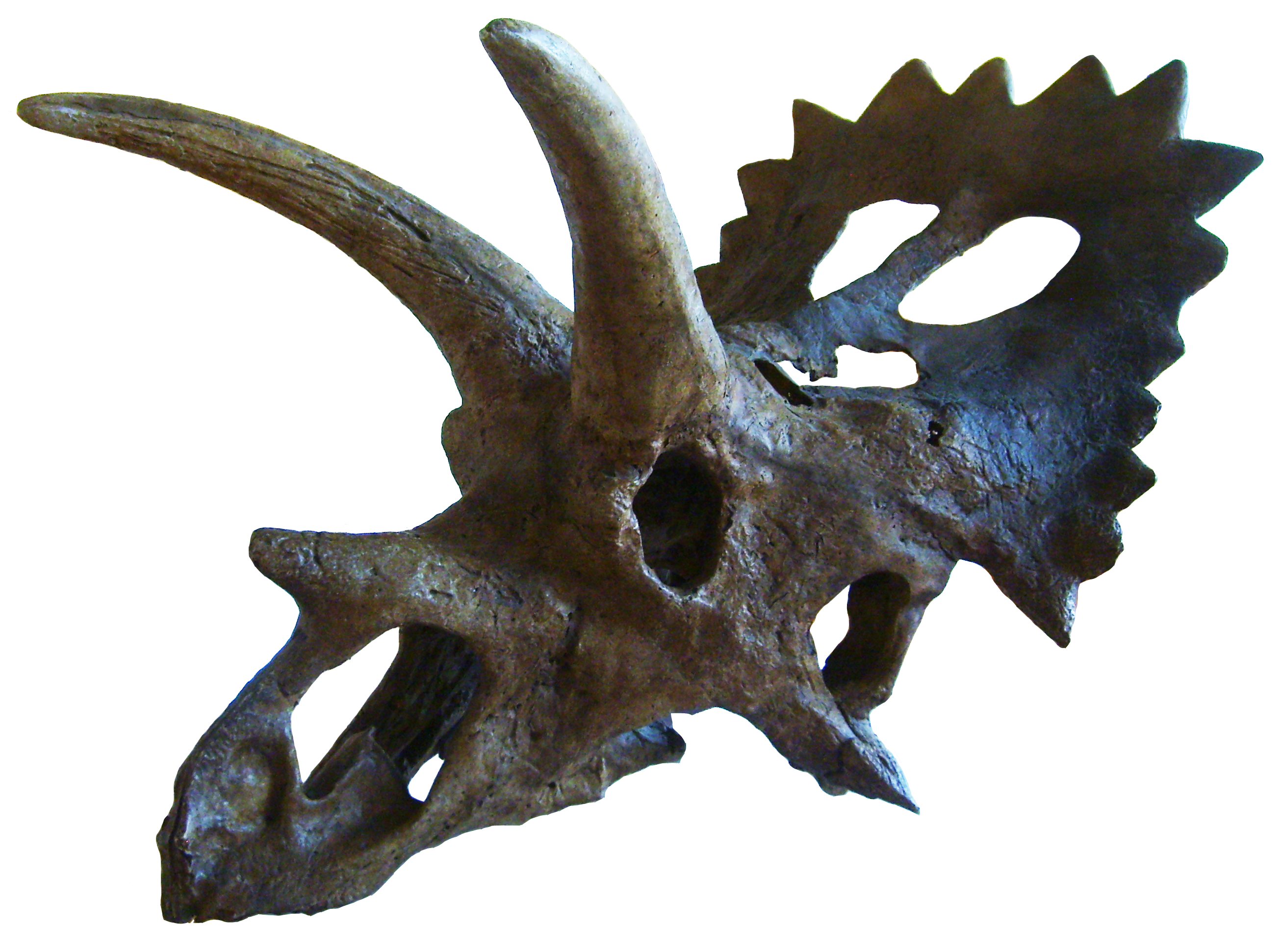
Skull of Anchiceratops

- Charles Mortram Sternberg described the fossilized skin of Chasmosaurus belli. The skin was preserved as an impression of skin covering the right side of the animal's pelvic region. C. belli had skin covered in small "nonimbricating" polygonal scales interspersed with rows of larger rounded plates up to 5.5 cm across spaced between 5 and 10 cm across.

==== 1928 ====
- Tait and Barnum Brown interpreted ceratopsids as low browsers than fed on herbaceous plants.

==== 1927 ====
- A Chasmosaurus skeletal mount was created for the National Museum of Canada. It was the first skeletal mount of Chasmosaurus ever created and the third skeletal mount of any ceratopsid.
- Sternberg argued that while the hindlimbs of Triceratops stood straight up and down, its forelimbs sprawled.

==== 1929 ====
- Sternberg described the species Anchiceratops longirostris.
- Richard Lull mounted a Centrosaurus apertus skeleton for the Yale Peabody Museum.

=== 1930s ===
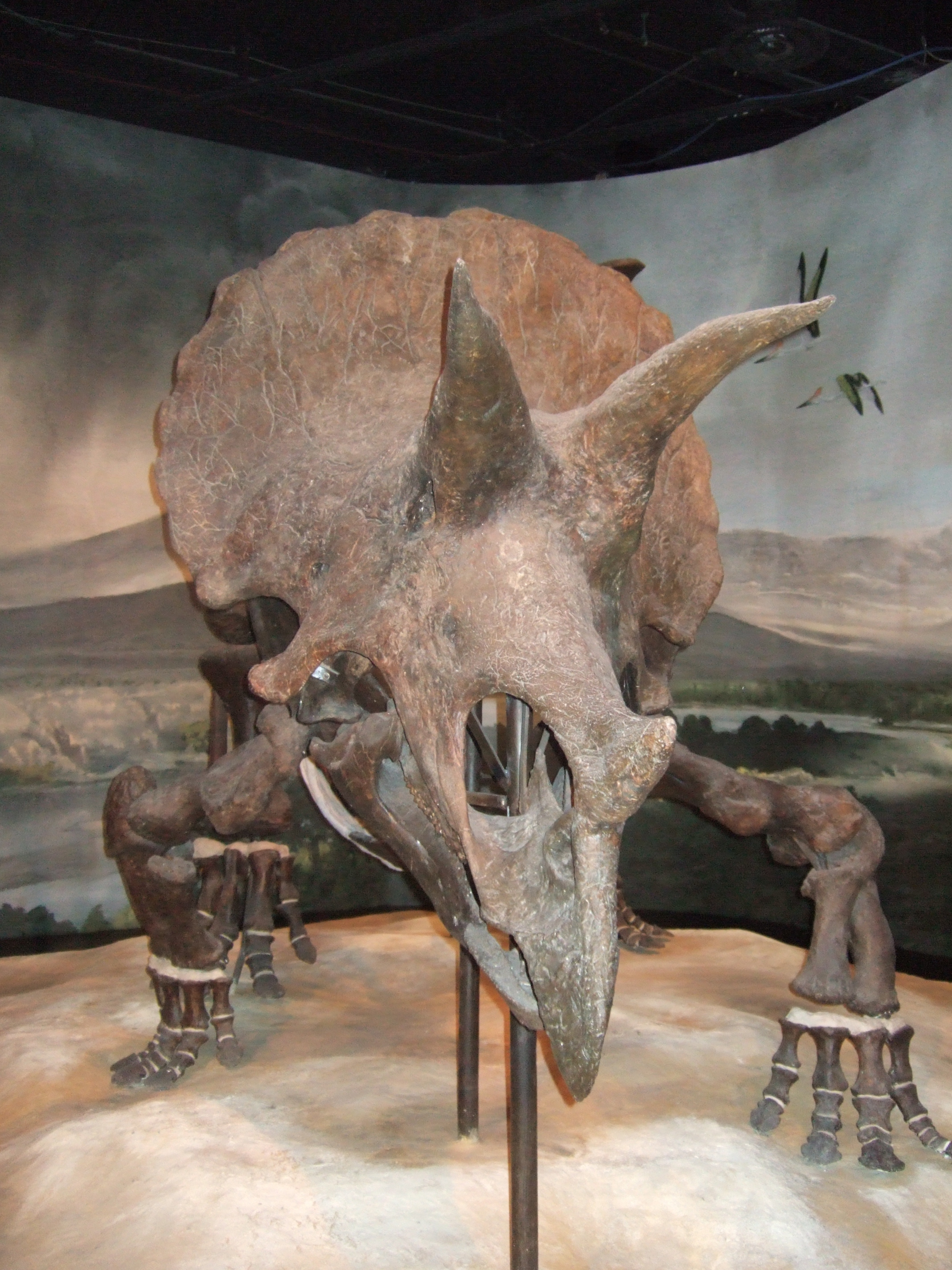
Henry Fairfield Osborn lent his support to reconstructing Triceratops with sprawling forelimbs.

==== 1930 ====
- Carl Wiman described the species Pentaceratops fenestratus.
- Gilmore described the species Styracosaurus ovatus.

==== 1931 ====
- Yang Zhongjian ("C.C. Young") described the species Psittacosaurus osborni and P. tingi.

==== 1933 ====
- Brown described the species Chasmosaurus kaiseni.
- Brown described the species Triceratops maximus.
- Lull described the species Chasmosaurus brevirostris.
- Lull described the fossilized skin of Monoclonius cutleri. The skin was preserved as an impression of skin near the far end of the animal's thigh. The skin of M. cutleri was similar to that of Chasmosaurus belli, which had skin covered in small "nonimbricating" polygonal scales interspersed with rows of larger rounded plates up to 5.5 cm across. The larger plate-like scales of M. cutleri, however, were more widely spaced than the 5–10 cm intervals seen in C. belli.
- Lull classified ceratopsids into two groups based on frill length in a scheme similar to that devised by Hatcher and others in 1907. Ceratopsids which he regarded as short-frilled forms include Centrosaurus, Styracosaurus, and Triceratops. Long-frilled taxa included Anchiceratops, Arrhinoceratops, Chasmosaurus, Pentaceratops, and Torosaurus.

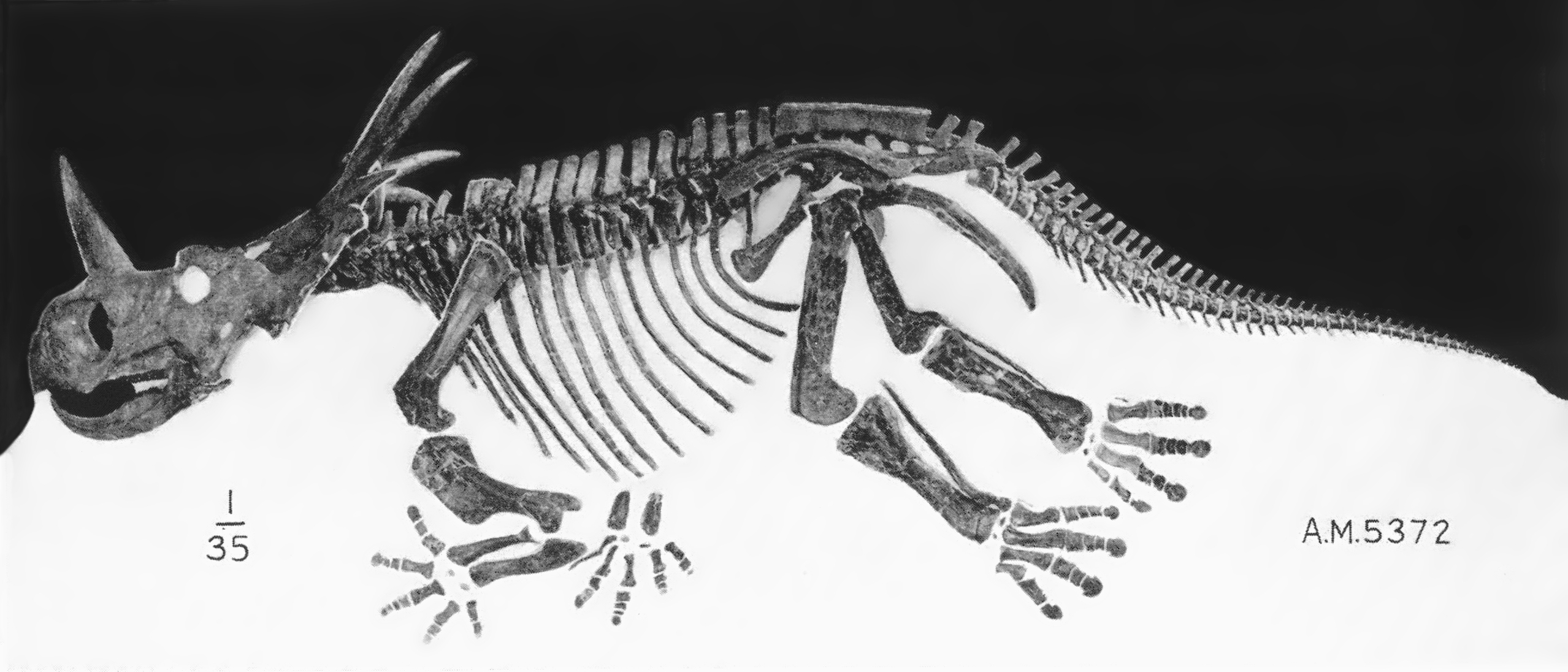
Skeleton of Styracosaurus "parksi"

- Osborn concurred with Sternberg's opinion that the forelimbs of Triceratops sprawled despite the erect posture of the hindlimb.

==== 1935 ====
- Erich Maren Schlaikjer described the species Triceratops eurycephalus.
- Russell interpreted ceratopsid frills as sites for the attachment of enlarged jaw muscles.

==== 1937 ====
- Brown and Schlaikjer described the species Styracosaurus parksi.

=== 1940s ===
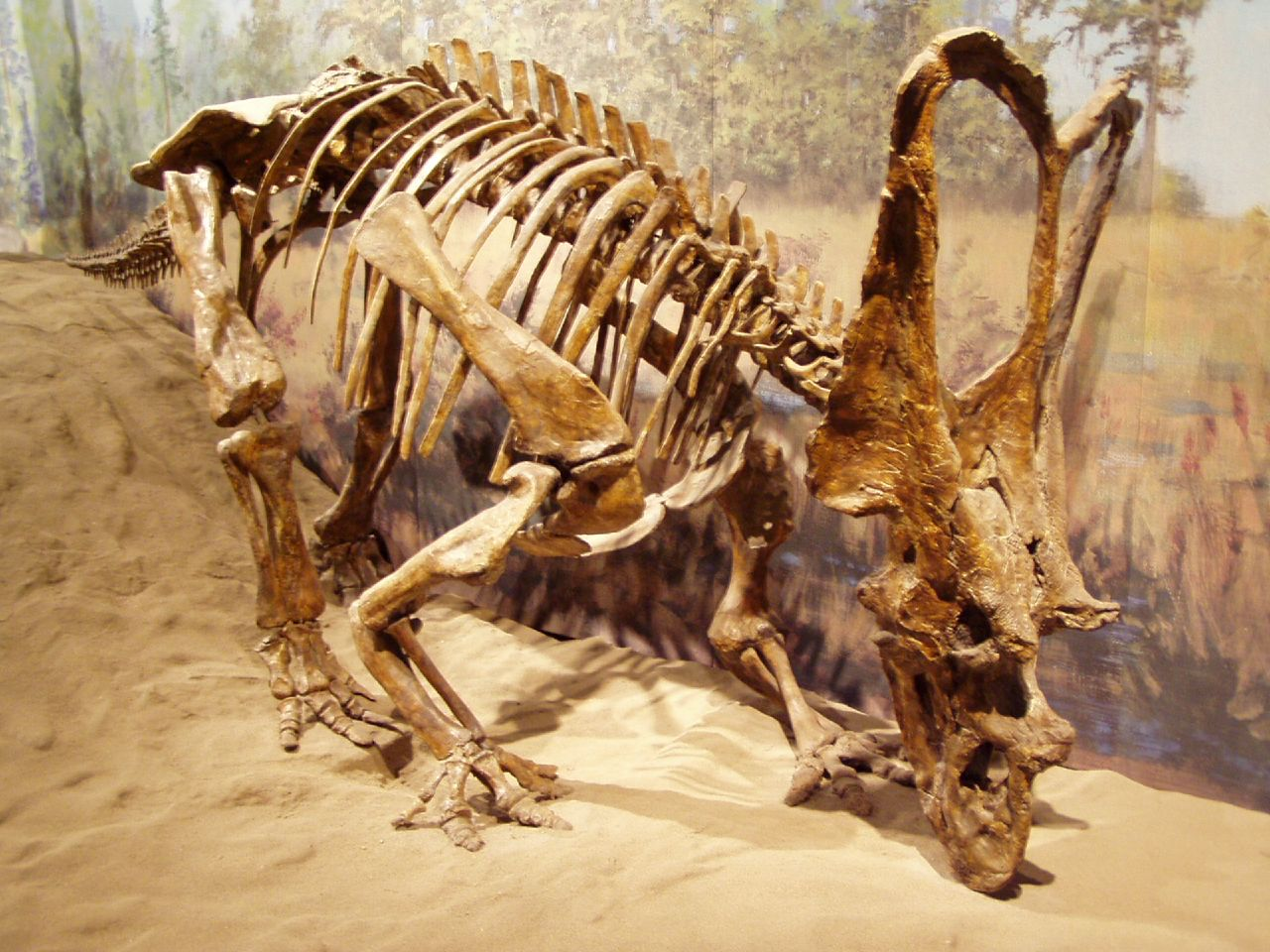
Skeletal mount of Chasmosaurus russelli

==== 1940 ====
- Sternberg described the species Centrosaurus longirostris.
- Sternberg described the species Monoclonius lowei.
- Sternberg described the species Chasmosaurus russeli.

==== 1942 ====
- Brown and Schlaikjer described the species Leptoceratops cerorhynchus.

==== 1946 ====
- Gilmore described the species Arrhinoceratops utahensis.

==== 1947 ====
- Colbert and Bump observed that ceratopsids like Pentaceratops and Torosaurus had the largest skulls on any terrestrial vertebrate.

==== 1949 ====
- Sternberg described the species Triceratops albertensis.
- Sternberg followed the division of the Ceratopsidae into short-frilled and long-frilled forms, but regarded Triceratops as an unusually short-frilled member of the long-frilled group.

=== 1950s ===
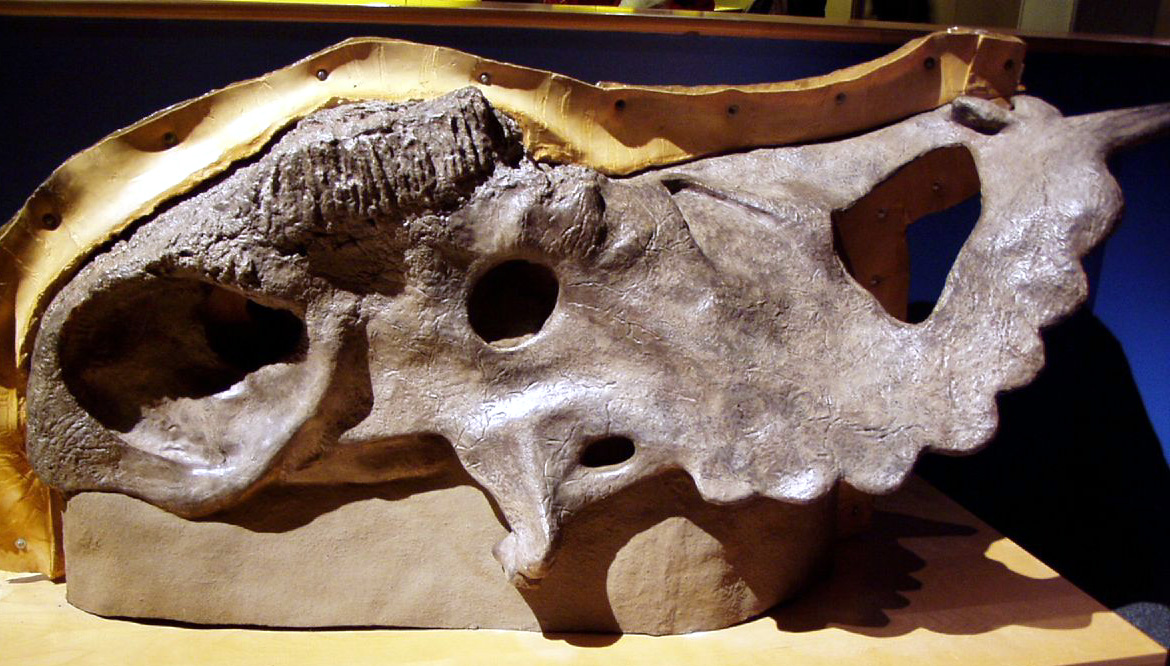
Pachyrhinosaurus canadensis skull on display at the Royal Tyrrell Museum

==== 1950 ====
- Sternberg described the new genus and species Pachyrhinosaurus canadensis.

==== 1951 ====
- Sternberg erected the new genus Montanoceratops for the species Leptoceratops cerorhynchus described by Brown and Schlaikjer in 1942.

==== 1953 ====
- Birger Bohlin described the new genus and species Microceratops gobiensis and M. sulcidens.

==== 1955 ====
- Haas interpreted ceratopsid frills as sites for the attachment of enlarged jaw muscles.

==== 1958 ====
- Young described the species Psittacosaurus sinensis.

==== 1959 ====
- Wann Langston, Jr. recorded evidence of a Centrosaurus bonebed near Hilda, Alberta.

=== 1960s ===
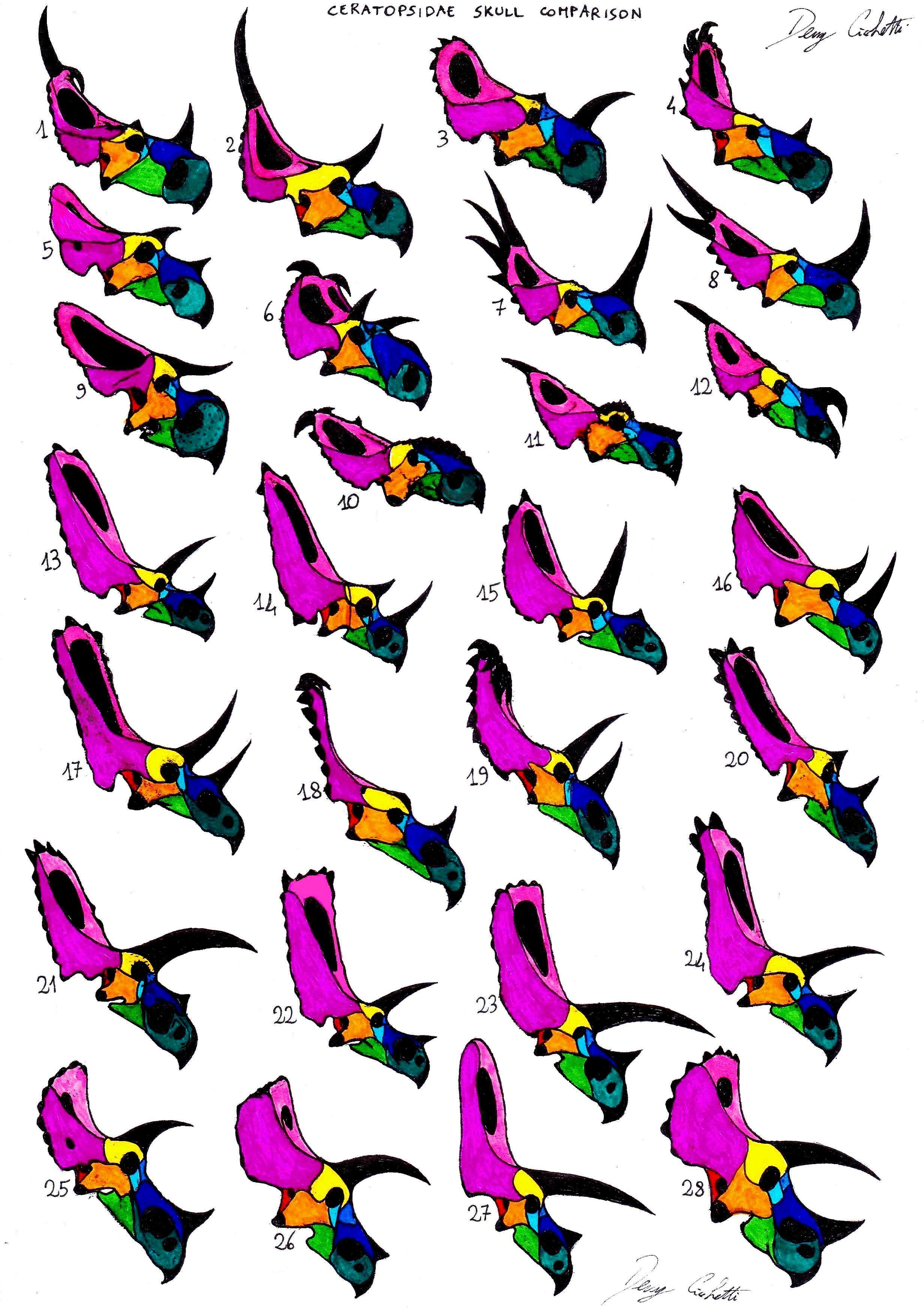
Davitashvili and others have argued that ceratopsids used their spectacular horns and frills in competitions over mates.

==== 1960 ====
- Murray and others reported ceratopsid remains from Mexico.

==== 1961 ====
- Davitashvili proposed that ceratopsids used their horns and frills in intraspecific competition over mates or territory. This hypothesis is supported by the observation that the horns and frills of ceratopsids are the primary source of variation between species within the family.

==== 1962 ====
- Chao described the species Psittacosaurus youngi.

==== 1964 ====
- John Ostrom described the functional morphology of ceratopsid jaws for the first time. He concluded that they fed on tough gymnosperms with significant fiber contents like palms and cycads. He also interpreted ceratopsid frills as sites for the attachment of enlarged jaw muscles.
- Don Taylor of the Provincial Museum of Alberta (now called the Royal Alberta Museum) found evidence of another Centrosaurus bonebed near Hilda, Alberta.

==== 1966 ====
- Ostrom further described the functional morphology of ceratopsid jaws. He observed that the ceratopsian beak was probably not designed for biting but was better suited for "grasping and plucking". He also interpreted ceratopsid frills as sites for the attachment of enlarged jaw muscles.
- Taylor's work on the second apparent Centrosaurus bonebed near Hilda, Alberta concluded.

==== 1967 ====
- Langston found additional support for Sternberg's reclassification of Triceratops among the long-frilled ceratopsids among the anatomical characteristics of its premaxilla. He also classified Pachyrhinosaurus among the short-frilled ceratopsids.

==== 1969 ====
- Steel followed Lull's division of the Ceratopsidae into short-frilled and long-frilled forms.

=== 1970s ===
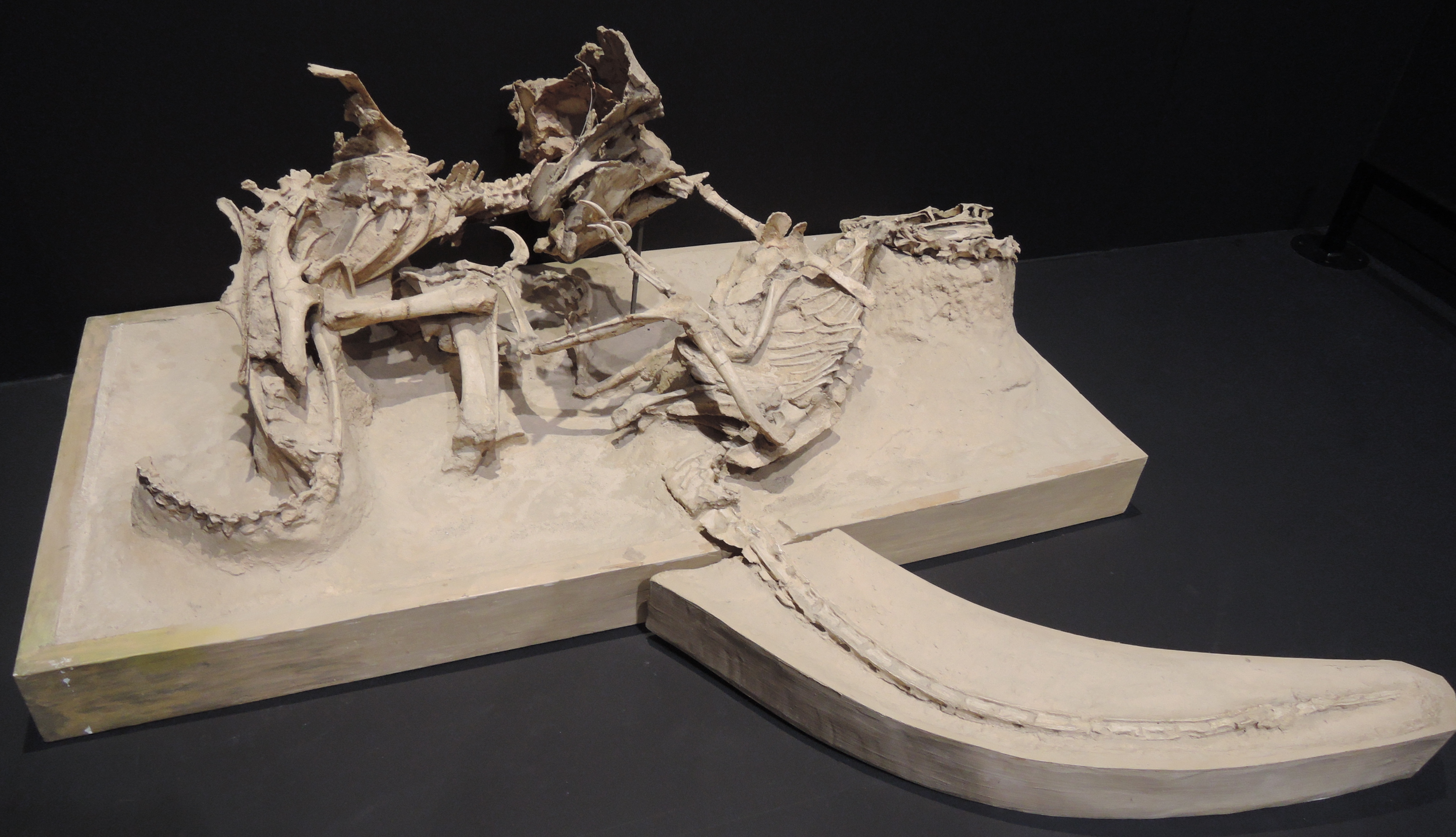
The fighting dinosaurs specimen of Protoceratops and Velociraptor

==== 1971 ====
- Richard Thulborn followed Lull's division of the Ceratopsidae into short-frilled and long-frilled forms.

==== 1972 ====
- Zofia Kielan-Jaworowska and Rinchen Barsbold reported the associated remains of a Velociraptor and Protoceratops apparently killed and preserved while fighting.
- Sergei Mikhailovich Kurzanov reported sexual dimorphism in the skull of Protoceratops andrewsi.

==== 1975 ====
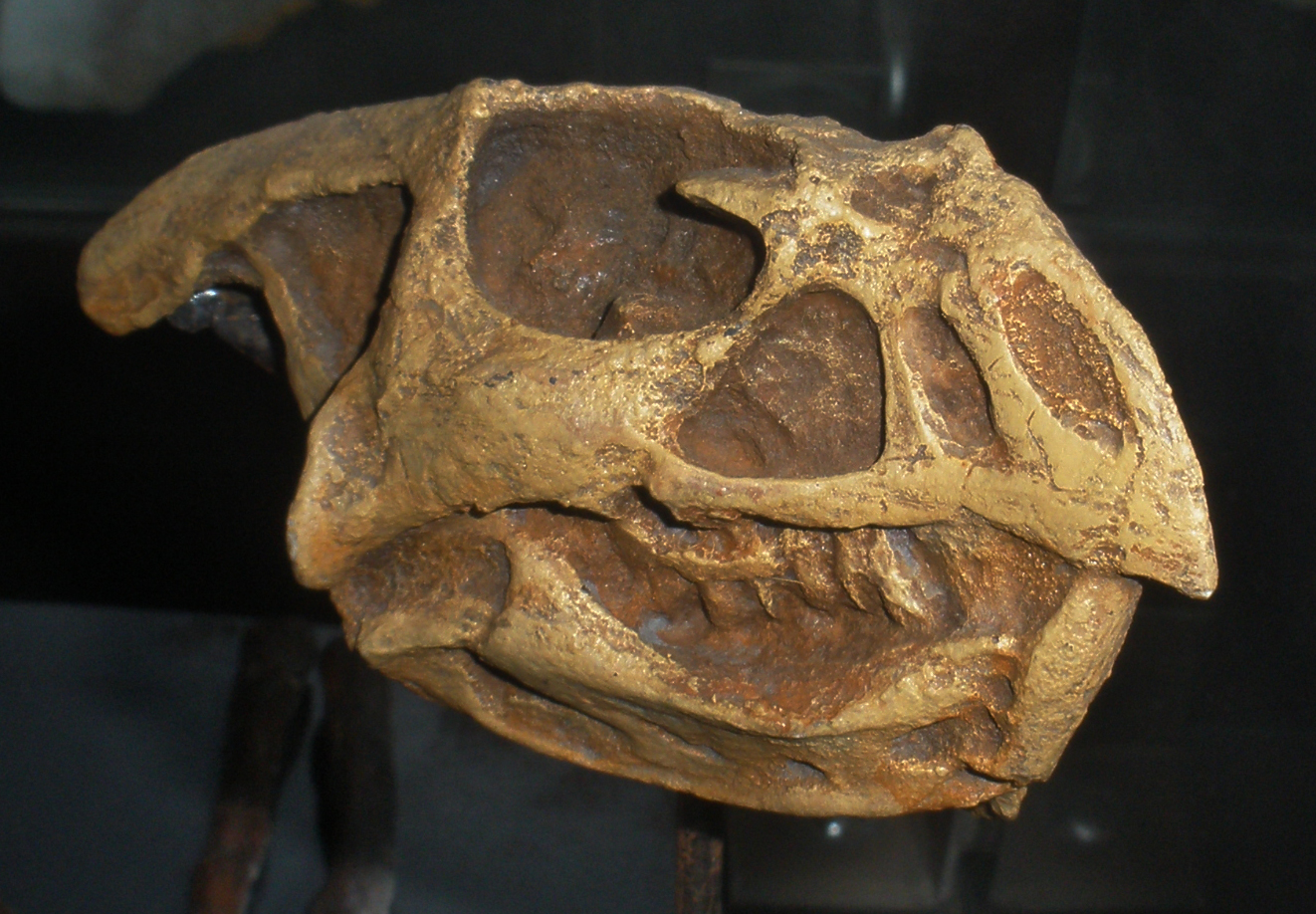
Skull of Bagaceratops

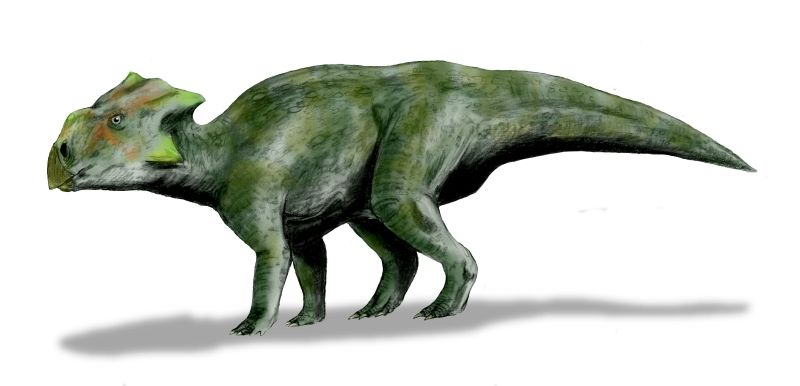
Artistic restoration of Bagaceratops

- Teresa Maryańska and Osmolska described the new genus and species Bagaceratops rozhdestventskyi. They also described the new species Protoceratops kozlowskii.
- Bratzeva and Novodvorskaja dated Psittacosaurus mongoliensis to near the Barremian-Aptian boundary based on fossil pollen and spores.
- James O. Farlow and Peter Dodson supported the hypothesis that ceratopsids used their horns and frills in competition over mates. This hypothesis is supported by the observation that the horns and frills of ceratopsids are the primary source of variation between species within the family. They also observed that in modern animals horns are primarily used to acquire mates. They also observed that ceratopsid horns and frills are only fully developed at sexual maturity.

==== 1976 ====
- Dodson published research on the sexual dimorphism present in the skull of Protoceratops. He found the sexes to vary based on the size of the ridge on the nose and the shape of the frill.

==== 1977 ====
- Ralph Molnar supported the hypothesis that ceratopsids used their horns and frills in competition over mates. This hypothesis is supported by the observation that the horns and frills of ceratopsids are the primary source of variation between species within the family.
- A Centrosaurus bone bed was discovered in Dinosaur Provincial Park. The site was later become known as Quarry 143.

==== 1978 ====
- Wheeler suggested that the horns and frills of ceratopsids primarily helped the animal regulate its body temperature based on these organs' large surface area and abundance of blood vessels.

==== 1979 ====
- Spassov supported the hypothesis that ceratopsids used their horns and frills in competition over mates.
- Paleontologists began excavating the Quarry 143 Centrosaurus bonebed.

=== 1980s ===
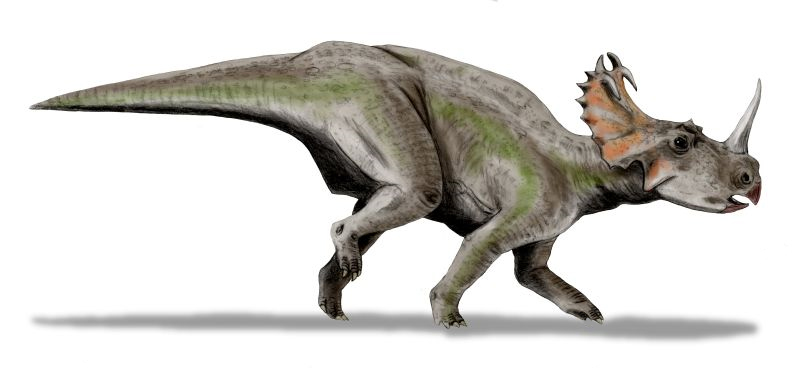
Artist's restoration of Centrosaurus

==== 1981 ====
- Colbert followed Lull's division of the Ceratopsidae into short-frilled and long-frilled forms.

==== 1983 ====
- Cheng described the new species Psittacosaurus guyangensis.
- Bakhurina reported Psittacosaurus fossils from near the Berriasian-Valanginian boundary in the Sangiin Dala Nuur depression. Most Psittacosaurus fossils date to an age closer to the Barremian-Aptian boundary.

==== 1984 ====
- Russell reported ceratopsid fossils from the Northwest Territories of Canada.
- Weishampel followed Ostrom's suggestion that ceratopsids fed on tough gymnosperms like palms and cycads.
- Phil Currie and Dodson hypothesized that the bonebeds preserving large numbers of individuals from a single ceratopsid species in channel deposits were formed by massive floods drowning herds of these dinosaurs.

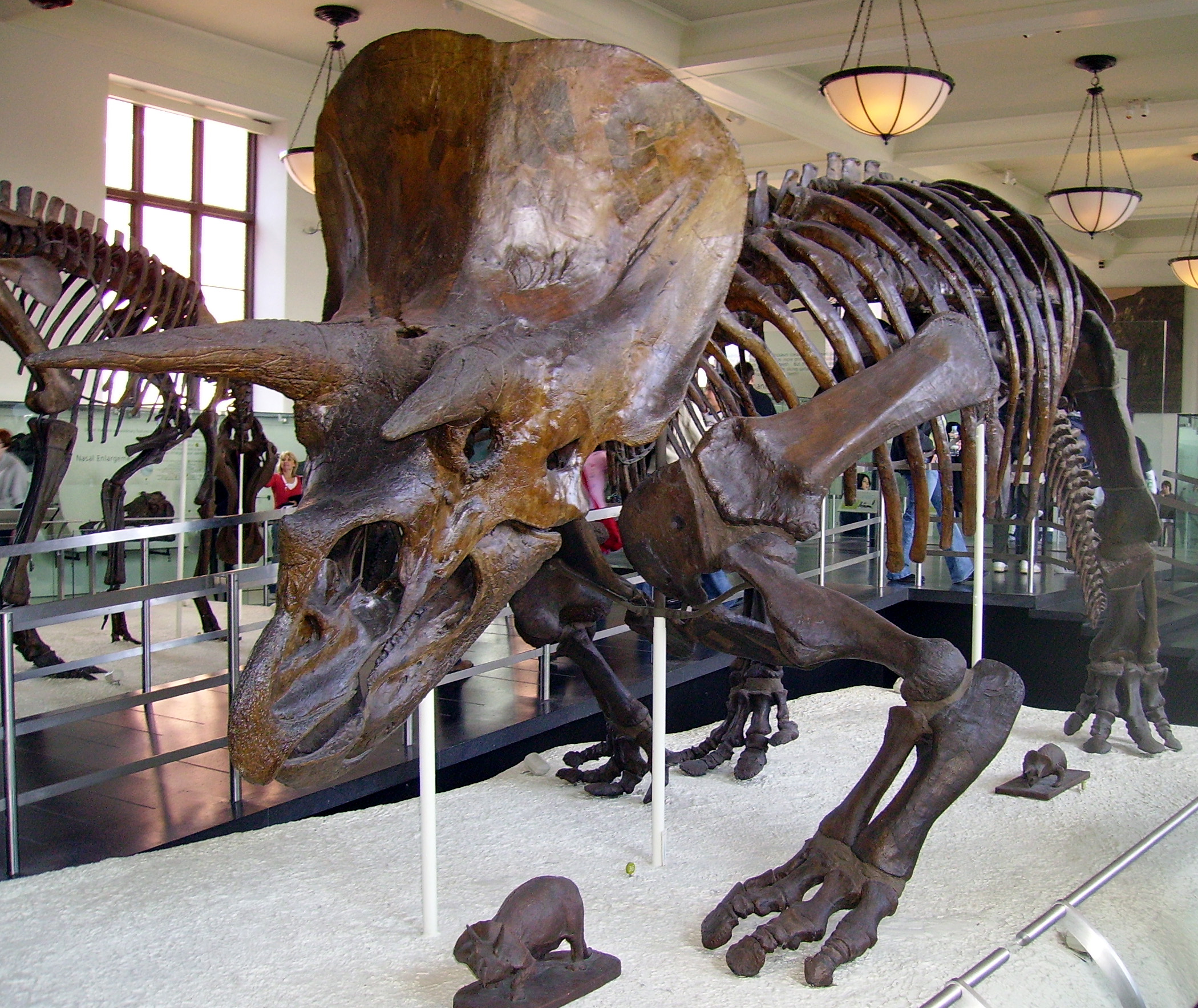
Skeletal mount of Triceratops "elatus", one of many species synonymized with Triceratops horridus in the 1980s

==== 1985 ====
- David Norman followed Lull's division of the Ceratopsidae into short-frilled and long-frilled forms.

==== 1986 ====
- Paul Sereno named the Neoceratopsia.
- Dodson described the new genus and species Avaceratops lammersi.
- Ostrom supported the hypothesis that ceratopsids used their horns and frills in competition over mates.
- Ostrom and Peter Wellnhofer argued that the various described species of Triceratops showed no more anatomical variation between each other than can be observed between individuals of any given species of modern horned mammal. Consequently, they considered all 16 named species to be synonymous, leaving T. horridus as the only valid Triceratops species. They supported the hypothesis that ceratopsids used their horns and frills in competition over mates.
- Robert T. Bakker supported the interpretation of ceratopsid horns and frills hypothesizing their use in defense against predators like tyrannosaurids.

==== 1987 ====
- Bakker illustrated ceratopsids with upright forelimbs.

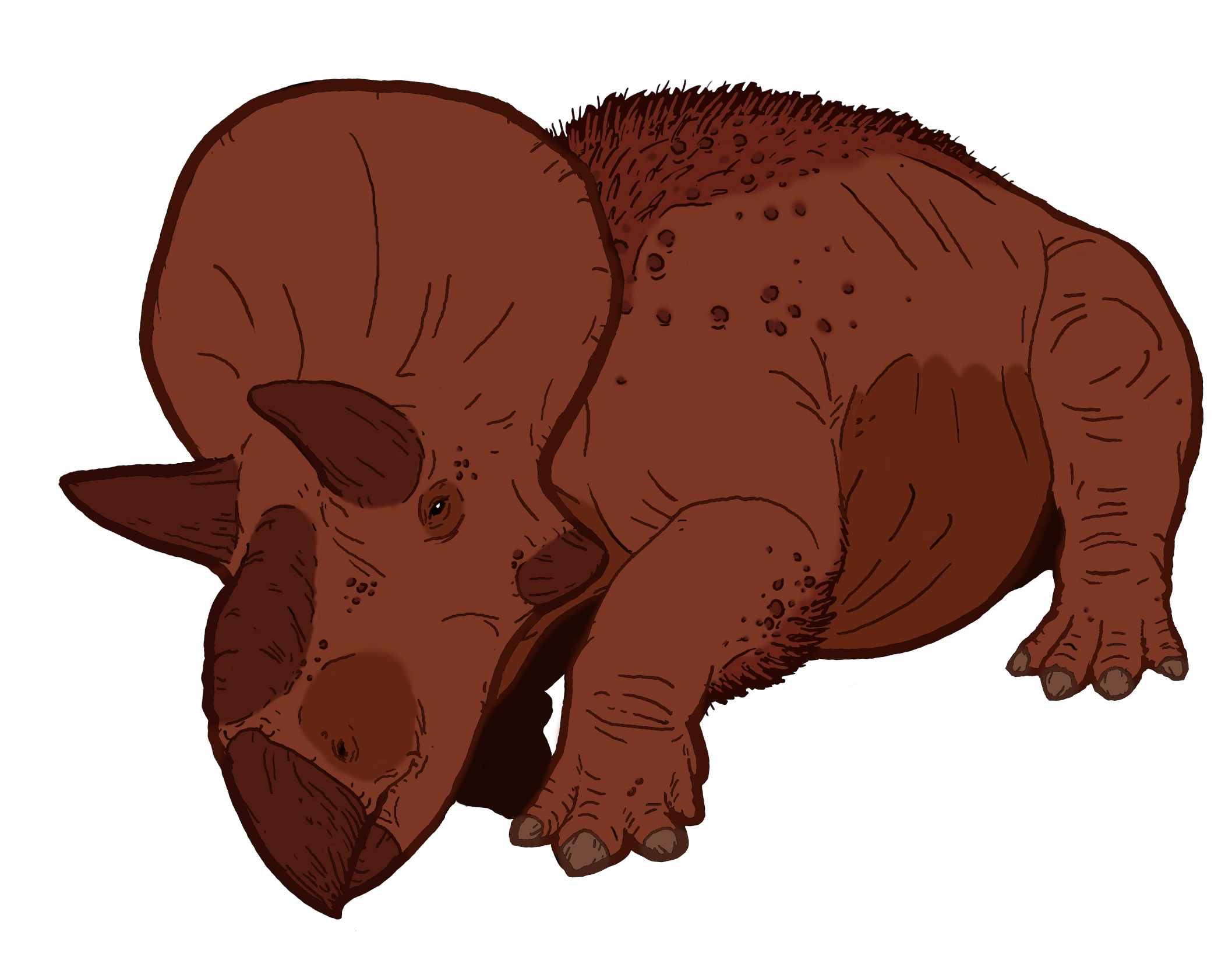
Artist's restoration of Turanoceratops

- Gregory S. Paul illustrated ceratopsids with upright forelimbs.
- Brouwers and others reported ceratopsid remains from a site that would have been located at a latitude of 85 degrees North during the Cretaceous.
- Cobabe and Fastovsky described the new genus and species Ugrosaurus olsoni.
- Lehman reported that 61–71% of the fossils found in deposits dating to the end of the Cretaceous period belong to a few ceratopsids, like Torosaurus and Triceratops.
- Lehman argued that ceratopsids preferred coastal habitats over more inland regions.
- Parrish and others reported ceratopsid remains from the North Slope of Alaska.
- Farlow studied the diet and digestive physiology of herbivorous dinosaurs and concluded that ceratopsids probably had slow metabolisms for their body size and used gut microbes to break-down low quality plant material during digestion.
- Coe and others argued that ferns were probably a major food source for herbivorous dinosaurs like ceratopsids and may have grown in vast "prairies" that could feed large numbers of dinosaurs.

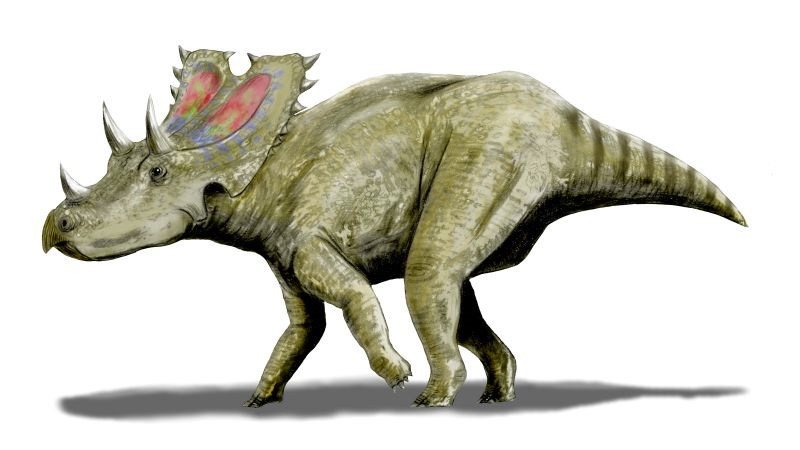
Artist's restorations of "Chasmosaurus" (now Agujaceratops) mariscalensis

- Coombs recognized some Asian fossils purported to be isolated ceratopsid horns as actually belonging to armored ankylosaurs.

==== 1988 ====
- Sereno and others described the new species Psittacosaurus meileyingensis.
- Sereno and Chao described the new species Psittacosaurus xinjiangensis.

==== 1989 ====
- Lev Nesov, Kaznyshkina, and Cherepanov described the new genus and species Asiaceratops salsopaludalis.
- Nessov, Kaznyshkina, and Cherepanov described the new genus and species Turanoceratops tardabilis. The great age, Asian provenance, and supposedly ceratopsid-like anatomy of this taxon would stir controversy regarding the family's geographic origins.
- Daniel Chure and McIntosh described the new genus Eucentrosaurus.
- Lehman described the new species Chasmosaurus mariscalensis.
- Lehman claimed to have found evidence for sexual dimorphism in the horns and frills of chasmosaurines.
- Lehman reported a ceratopsian bonebed from Texas.

=== 1990s ===
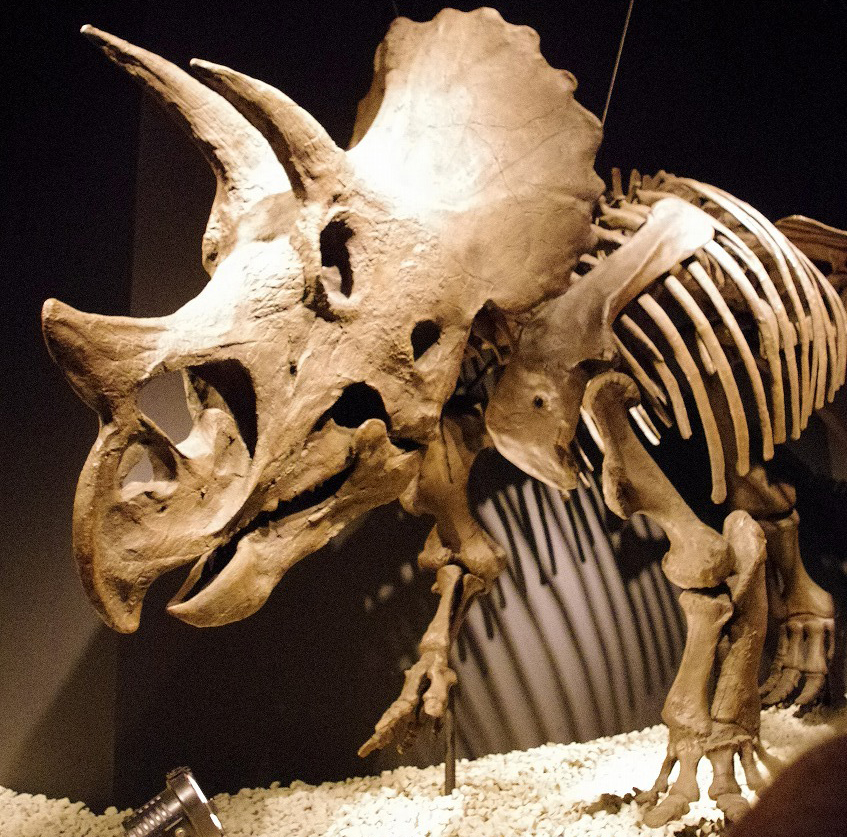
The status of Triceratops as a "long-frilled" ceratopsid became a consensus view in the early 1990s.

==== 1990 ====
- Brinkman argued that ceratopsids preferred coastal habitats over more inland regions.
- Kurzanov erected the new genus Breviceratops for the species Protoceratops kozlowskii that had been described by Maryanska and Osmolska in 1975.
- Dodson osberved that psittacosaurs are among the most common dinosaurs in the fossil record.
- Dodson claimed to have found evidence for sexual dimorphism in the horns and frills of centrosaurines. Dodson performed a cladistic analysis of the centrosaurines. He observed that Triceratops is one of the most common dinosaurs in the fossil record.
- Dodson and Currie performed a cladistic analysis of the ceratopsids found further support for regarding Triceratops as a "long-frilled" ceratopsid.
- Lehman supported Ostrom and Wellnhofer's conclusion that there was only one valid species of Triceratops. He divided the Ceratopsidae into two subfamilies originally named by Lambe, the Centrosaurinae and the Chasmosaurinae. This has been the accepted classification scheme for ceratopsids ever since.
- Lehman performed a cladistic analysis of the Chasmosaurines.
- Sereno reported the association of 50 gastroliths associate with two psittacosaurid skeletons. These gastroliths probably helped break down the plants it ate. He also noticed that the first toe of the front foot was offset from the others and could probably be used to grasp vegetation.
- Catherine Forster argued that there was no satisfactory evidence for sexual dimorphism in ceratopsids. She also joined the growing consensus that Triceratops should be classified among the long-frilled ceratopsids. Forster performed a cladistic analysis of the ceratopsids. She argued against the idea that ceratopsid frills served as attachment sites for large jaw muscles. She observed that the opening in the skull above the animal's temple seems to show the physical location extent of the jaw muscle attachment point. She supported the hypothesis that ceratopsids used their horns and frills in competition over mates.
- Rogers observed that ceratopsid bonebeds are associated with signs that the local ancient climate had seasonal or semiarid levels of precipitation and speculated that drought was likely responsible for the deaths of these dinosaurs.

==== 1991 ====
- Paul illustrated ceratopsids with upright forelimbs.

==== 1992 ====
- Buffetaut and Suteethorn described the new species Psittacosaurus sattayaraki.

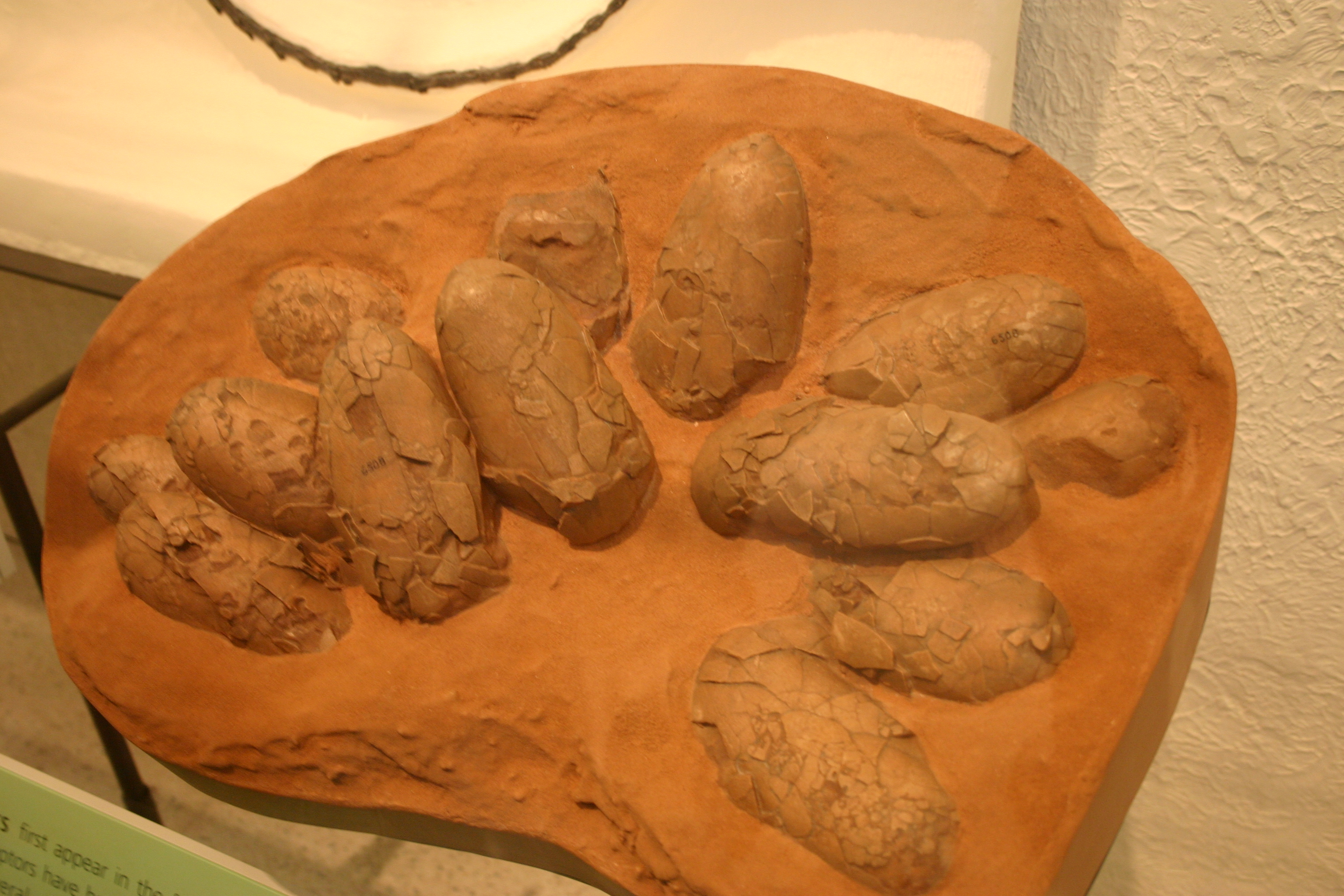
Fossil eggs like these were actually laid by the bird-like theropod Oviraptor, not Protoceratops.

- Kurzanov described the new genus and species Udanoceratops tschizhovi.
- Horner and others observed that ceratopsid horns and frills are only fully developed at sexual maturity. They hypothesized that since ceratopsid bodies were generally fairly similar, changes in cranial adornments played a major role in ceratopsid evolution.

==== 1993 ====
- Dong and Currie reported Protoceratops embryos from Bayan Mandhu in China.
- Osmolska challenged Kielan-Jawarowska and Barsbold's 1972 interpretation of an associated skeleton of Velociraptor and Protoceratops as being of two animals killed and preserved while locked in mortal combat. She reinterpreted the association as a Velociraptor that had been killed while scavenging an already dead Protoceratops.
- Clemens and Nelms reported centrosaurine remains from Alaska.
- Dodson supported the intraspecific competition over mates interpretation of ceratopsid horns and frills with the observation that the horns and frills of ceratopsids are the primary source of variation between species within the family.

==== 1994 ====
- Norell and others noted that the supposed Protoceratops eggs of the Central Asiatic Expeditions actually preserved the embryonic remains of oviraptorosaurs.

==== 1995 ====
- Nessov described the new genus and species Kulceratops kulensis.
- Nessov argued that Turanoceratops was a ceratopsid because it had horns and teeth with two roots.

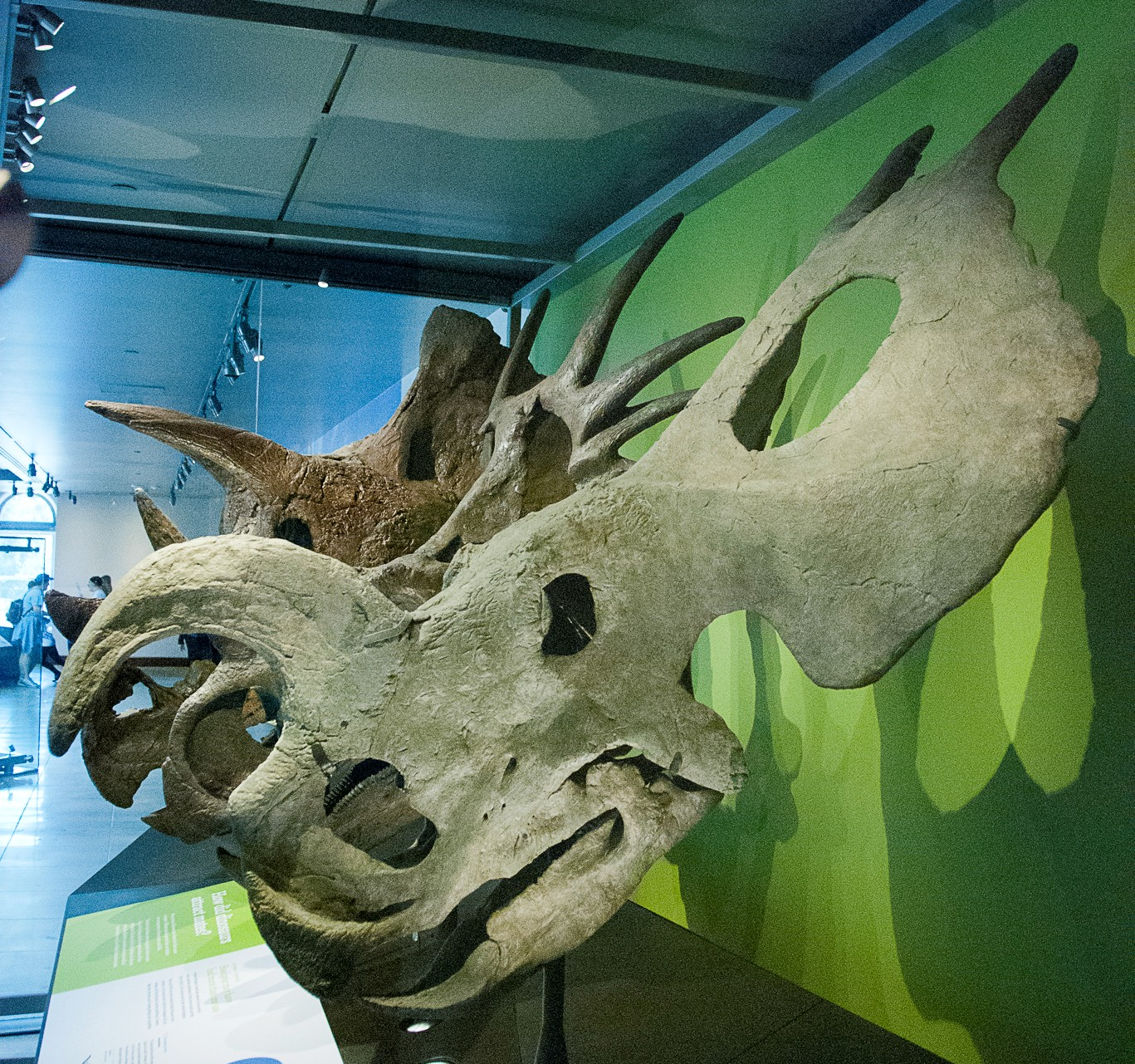
Skull of Einiosaurus procurvicornis

- Scott D. Sampson described the new genus and species Achelousaurus horneri. Sampson described the new genus and species Einiosaurus procurvicornis.
- Sampson performed a cladistic analysis of the centrosaurines.
- Sampson supported the intraspecific competition over mates interpretation of ceratopsid horns and frills with the observation that the horns and frills of ceratopsids are the primary source of variation between species within the family.
- Sampson observed that ceratopsid horns and frills are only fully developed at sexual maturity.
- Godfrey and Holmes examined variability within Chasmosaurus and concluded that it contained two valid species; C. russelli and C. belli. Godfrey and Holmes performed a cladistic analysis of Chasmosaurus.
- Johnson and Ostrom studied the anatomy of the ceratopsid forelimb and concluded that it was inconsistent with a fully erect stance despite the tendency of artists to draw them that way. Instead they concluded that ceratopsids stood with the front limbs in a semi-erect posture.
- Martin Lockley and Adrian Hunt named the new ichnogenus and ichnospecies Ceratopsipes goldenensis, interpreting it as fossilized ceratopsid footprints. They argued that the narrow width of the foreprints were evidence for the upright forelimb hypothesis and inconsistent with sprawling reconstructions.

==== 1996 ====
- Russell and Zhao described the species Psittacosaurus neimongoliensis and P. ordosensis.

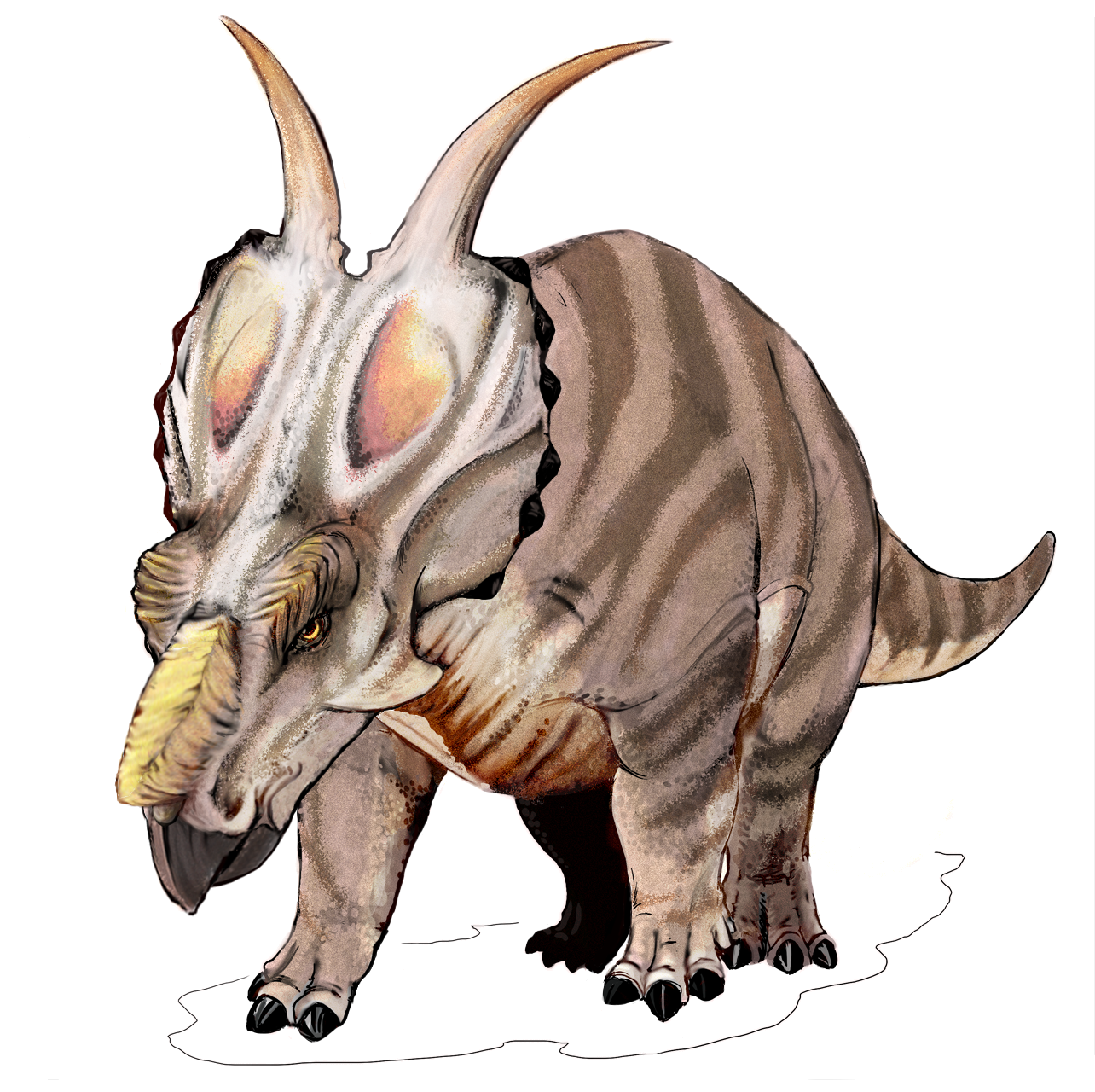
Artistic restoration of Achelousaurus horneri

- Forster used cladistics and morphometrics to determine, which, if any of the species referred to Triceratops are valid. She found that Triceratops came in two varieties, both found in the same rocks in the same places. One corresponded with the type species T. horridus, and the other with the referred species T. prorsus. She concluded that these were probably both valid species, although admitted the possibility that these forms were males and females of the same species. She also considered Diceratops hatcheri to be a valid genus and species.
- She argued against the idea that ceratopsid frills served as attachment sites for large jaw muscles.
- Eberth estimated a ceratopsid bonebed to preserve more than a thousand individuals.
- Dodson studied the anatomy of the ceratopsid forelimb and concluded that it was inconsistent with a fully erect stance despite the tendency of artists to draw them that way. Instead they concluded that ceratopsids stood with the front limbs in a semi-erect posture. He argued against the interpretation Lockley and Hunt made of the forprints left behind by the trackmaker of their 1995 ichnospecies Ceratopsipes goldenensis as supporting the erect-forelimb hypothesis, instead Dodson suggested that the width of the Ceratopsipes foreprints were still consistent with the sprawling reconstruction supported by the actual limb anatomy.
- Dodson disagreed with Ostrom's suggestion that ceratopsids fed on ferns and cycads because the flora of the late Cretaceous environments of Alberta were largely made up of other kinds of plants and this is the time and place in earth's history where ceratopsids were at their most diverse.
- Dodson argued against the idea that ceratopsid frills served as attachment sites for enlarged jaw muscles.
- Dodson supported the hypothesis that ceratopsids used their horns and frills in competition over mates. Dodson supported the intraspecific competition over mates interpretation of ceratopsid horns and frills with the observation that the horns and frills of ceratopsids are the primary source of variation between species within the family. Dodson also observed that in modern animals horns are primarily used to acquire mates.
- Barrick and others found evidence for a temperature gradient across the horns and frills of ceratopsids. This is consistent with Wheeler's 1978 hypothesis that these organs evolved to help regulate the animals' temperatures.
- Dong and Currie reported the discovery of an oviraptorid from the Djadokhta Formation of northern China preserved on top of a nest of eggs. This overturned more than 60 years of interpreting the Oviraptor of the Central Asiatic Expeditions as a rapacious egg-thief in favor of it likely being a faithful mother at her nest.
- The Royal Tyrell Museum finally performed a preliminary survey of the bonebeds studied by Langston and Taylor in the 1950s and 1960s. The survey discovered entire new bonebeds in the area.

==== 1997 ====
- Dodson and Farlow studied the anatomy of the ceratopsid forelimb and concluded that it was inconsistent with a fully erect stance despite the tendency of artists to draw them that way. Instead they concluded that ceratopsids stood with the front limbs in a semi-erect posture. They also concluded that Lockley and Hunt had overextended themselves by trying to infer limb posture from the Ceratopsipes footprints, which they felt was impossible.

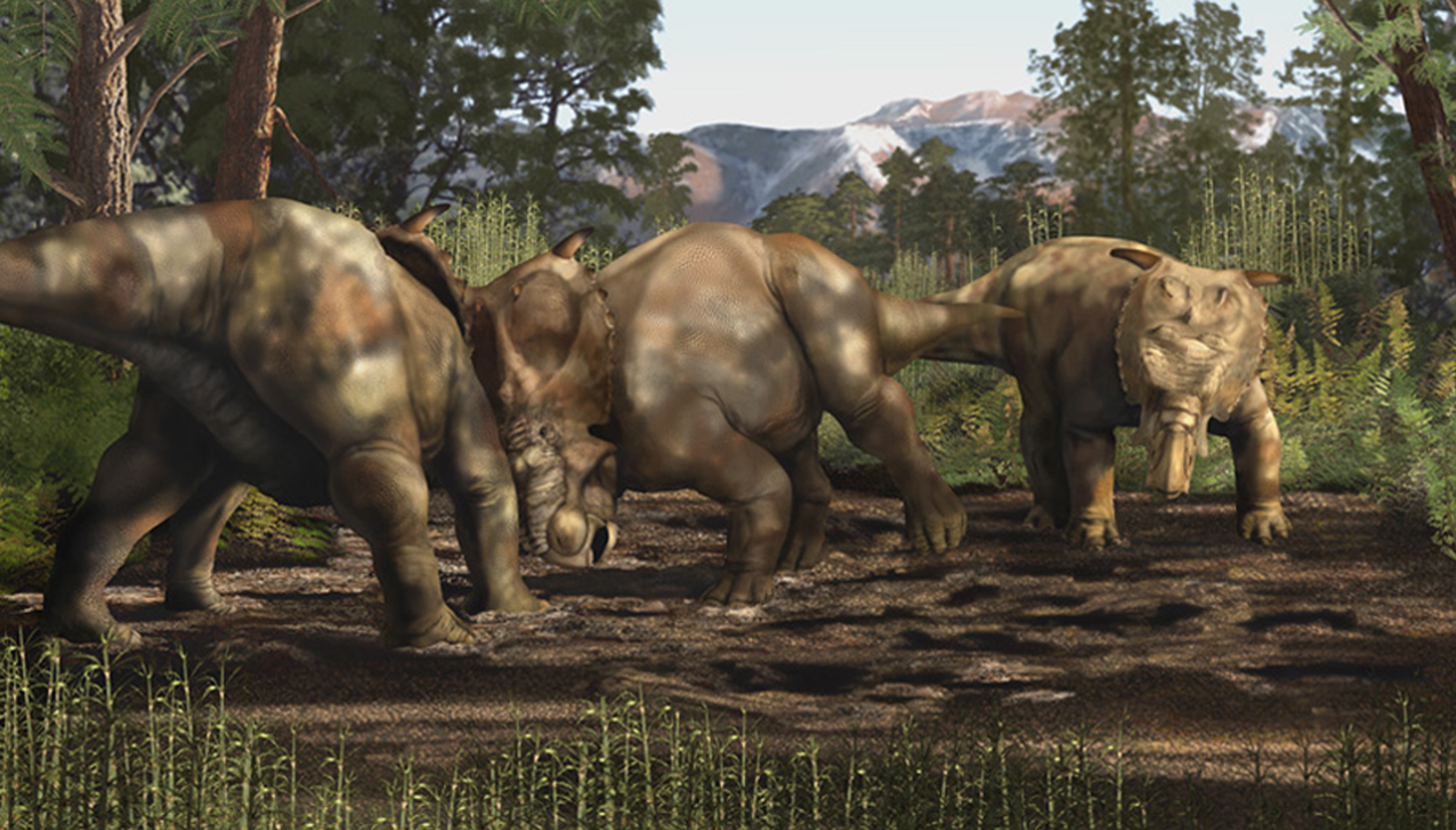
The Alaskan Pachyrhinosaurus species P. perotorum

- Xu described the species Psittacosaurus mazongshanensis.
- Dong and Azuma described the new genus and species Archaeoceratops oshimai.
- Matsumoto found the limb posture of Protoceratops to be typical of neither reptiles, nor mammals.
- Rich and others reported the presence of Pachyrhinosaurus remains in Alaska.
- Williamson reported centrosaurine remains from the Menefee Formation in New Mexico.
- Lehman argued that the two supposedly distinct species of Chasmosaurus were really just variant individuals of a single species.

Sampson and others studied centrosaurine bonebeds and found that the individuals preserved therein could be categorized into three broad phases of developments; juveniles, subadults, and adults. The researchers defined these age groups based on specimens' body size, the surface texture of their bones, and how completely closed the sutures between their bones were. They observed that the juveniles and subadults of different centrosaurine species are practically indistinguishable and can only be told apart upon reaching adulthood when their horns and frills were fully developed.

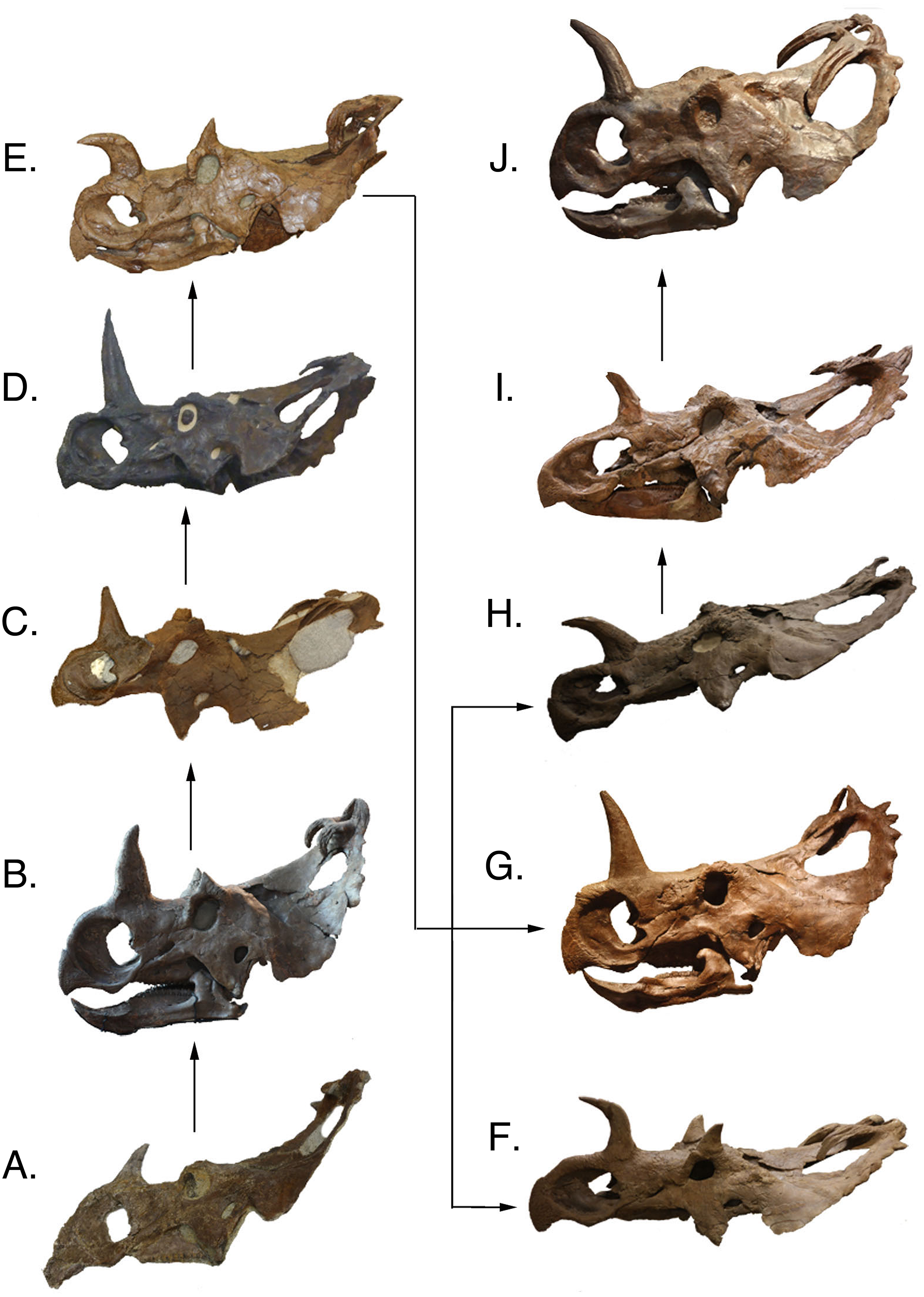
The ontogeny of Centrosaurus skulls

Sampson and the other researchers interpreted the delay of ceratopsid horn and frill development to sexual maturity as further evidence for the hypothesis that these traits evolved primarily for competition over mates. They disagreed with more functional explanations for these structures, like the idea that the frills served as attachment points for enlarged jaw muscles. The researchers also marshalled support from the fact that the horns and frills of ceratopsids are the primary source of variation between species within the family and observations of modern animals, whose horns are also primarily used to acquire mates. Nevertheless, they argued that there was still no evidence for sexual dimorphism in ceratopsids.

The researchers argued that the anatomical variation in horns and frills and their delayed development had taxonomic implications. They concluded that species based on immature type specimens like Brachyceratops montanensis and Monoclonius crassus were dubious because immature individuals would not yet have developed the primary traits paleontologists rely on to distinguish one kind of ceratopsid from another. Likewise, they dismissed Avaceratops as just a juvenile rather than a small adult from a distinct taxon. Sampson and the other researchers noted that bonebeds differing in location and age all preserved "Monoclonius-like" fossils left behind by immature animals, which is consistent with the idea that these remains are actually the juveniles of a variety of species from different times and places rather than a unique kind of animal in their own right.

- Sampson supported the hypothesis that ceratopsids used their horns and frills in competition over mates.
- Sereno disagreed with Nessov's claim that Turanoceratops was a ceratopsid. Instead, Sereno found Turanoceratops to be the closest known relative of the family without technically being a member itself. Its position at the base of the ceratopsid family tree suggests that the family originated in Asia.
- White and others observed that remains of Triceratops have been found in every kind of depositional environment preserved by the Hell Creek Formation. They also noticed that even though Triceratops remains are widespread and common, they are not found in bonebeds like many ceratopsids are.
- Carrano studied dinosaur locomotion. He concluded that ceratopsids were highly graviportal and may not have been able to gallop.
- Barrick and others found additional evidence for a temperature gradient across the horns and frills of ceratopsids. This is consistent with Wheeler's 1978 hypothesis that these organs evolved to help regulate the animals' temperatures.
- The Royal Tyrell Museum intensified its investigation of the bonebeds near Hilda, Alberta. In only two days, researchers discovered 14 separate bonebeds in one mudstone bed that extended for at least 7 km, with 3.7 km worth of visible outcrops.

==== 1998 ====
- Wolfe and Kirkland described the new genus and species Zuniceratops christopheri.

==== 1999 ====
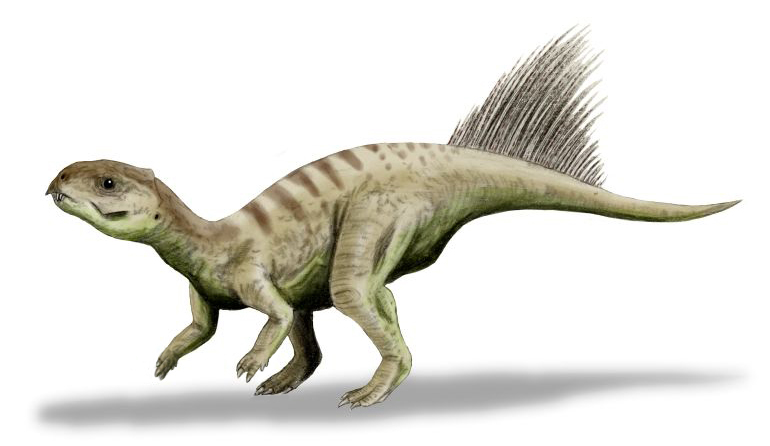
Artistic restoration of Chaoyangsaurus youngi

- Zhao, Cheng, and Xu described the new genus and species Chaoyangsaurus youngi. They contended that the presence of such an early, primitive ceratopsian in Asia suggested that this continent was where the ceratopsians first originated.
- Swisher and others dated the Psittacosaurus fossils of the Yixian Formation to near the Barremian-Aptian boundary based on Argon-Argon radiometric dating.
- Chinsamy and Trexler noted that the fossil record of basal neoceratopsians is actually of relatively high quality. They found that complete skulls were known for about half of the genera named up to this point and many had good postcranial remains and/or multiple specimens.
- Clark and others argued that it was impossible to know whether or not Velociraptor was a predator of Protoceratops based on the famous "fighting dinosaurs" specimen, since this was only one specimen.
- Penkalski and Dodson argued that Avaceratops was not a true ceratopsid after all. It was, however, the family's nearest known evolutionary relative. They performed a cladistic analysis of the centrosaurines.
- Andersen and others used computers to model the kinetics of the Triceratops skeleton curated by the Smithsonian Institution.
- Chapman and others used computers to model the kinetics of the Triceratops skeleton curated by the Smithsonian Institution.
- Jabo and others used computers to model the kinetics of the Triceratops skeleton curated by the Smithsonian Institution.
- Sampson hypothesized that since ceratopsid bodies were generally fairly similar, changes in cranial adornments played a major role in ceratopsid evolution.

== 21st century ==
=== 2000s ===
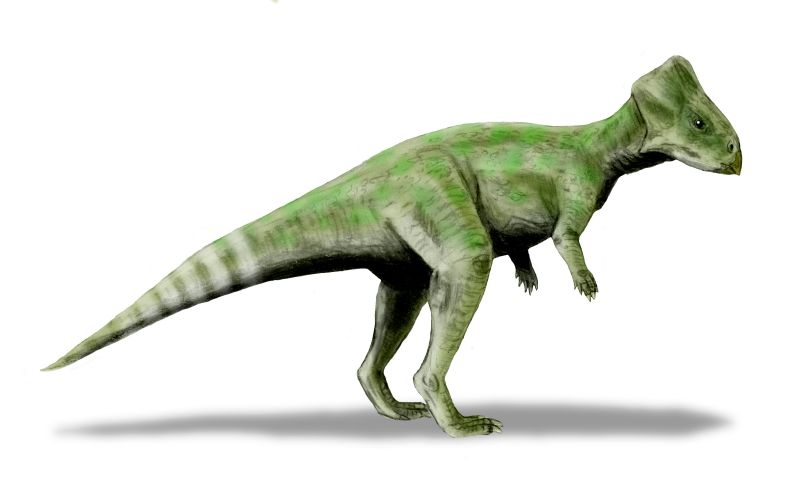
Artistic restoration of Graciliceratops mongoliensis

==== 2000 ====
- Paul and Christiansen studied ceratopsid forelimbs and concluded that in life the animal probably stood with its elbows slightly everted but with its forelimbs otherwise erect. They also concluded that ceratopsians had faster running speeds than modern elephants and were able to gallop.
- Sereno described the new genus and species Graciliceratops mongoliensis.
- Lambert and others described the new species Protoceratops hellenikorhinus.
- Shuvalov reported Psittacosaurus fossils from near the Berriasian-Valanginian boundary in the Sangiin Dala Nuur depression. Most Psittacosaurus fossils date to an age closer to the Barremian-Aptian boundary.
- Erickson and Tumanova reported Psittacosaurus mongoliensis fossils from Khamaryn Us in Mongolia that ranged from 0.9 kg juveniles to 19.9 kg adults. They found that it took 9 years for a Psittacosaurus to become fully grown. To reach that size in that time frame it must have grown at a rate of 12.5 grams per day. This is four times faster than modern reptiles and 25% faster than modern marsupials. However it is only three to twenty times as slow as modern eutherian mammals and birds.
- Weishampel and others reported the presence of fifteen Protoceratops hatchlings from a single nest in an Aeolian sandstone deposit in the central Gobi Desert.

==== 2001 ====
- Tang and others dated Psittacosaurus mazongshanensis to near the Barremian-Aptian boundary based on fossil pollen and spores.
- Witmer studied the nasal passages of ceratopsids. He found that the nasal vestibule of cerastopsids is complex and may have helped regulate the animal's body temperature through its effect on inhaled air.

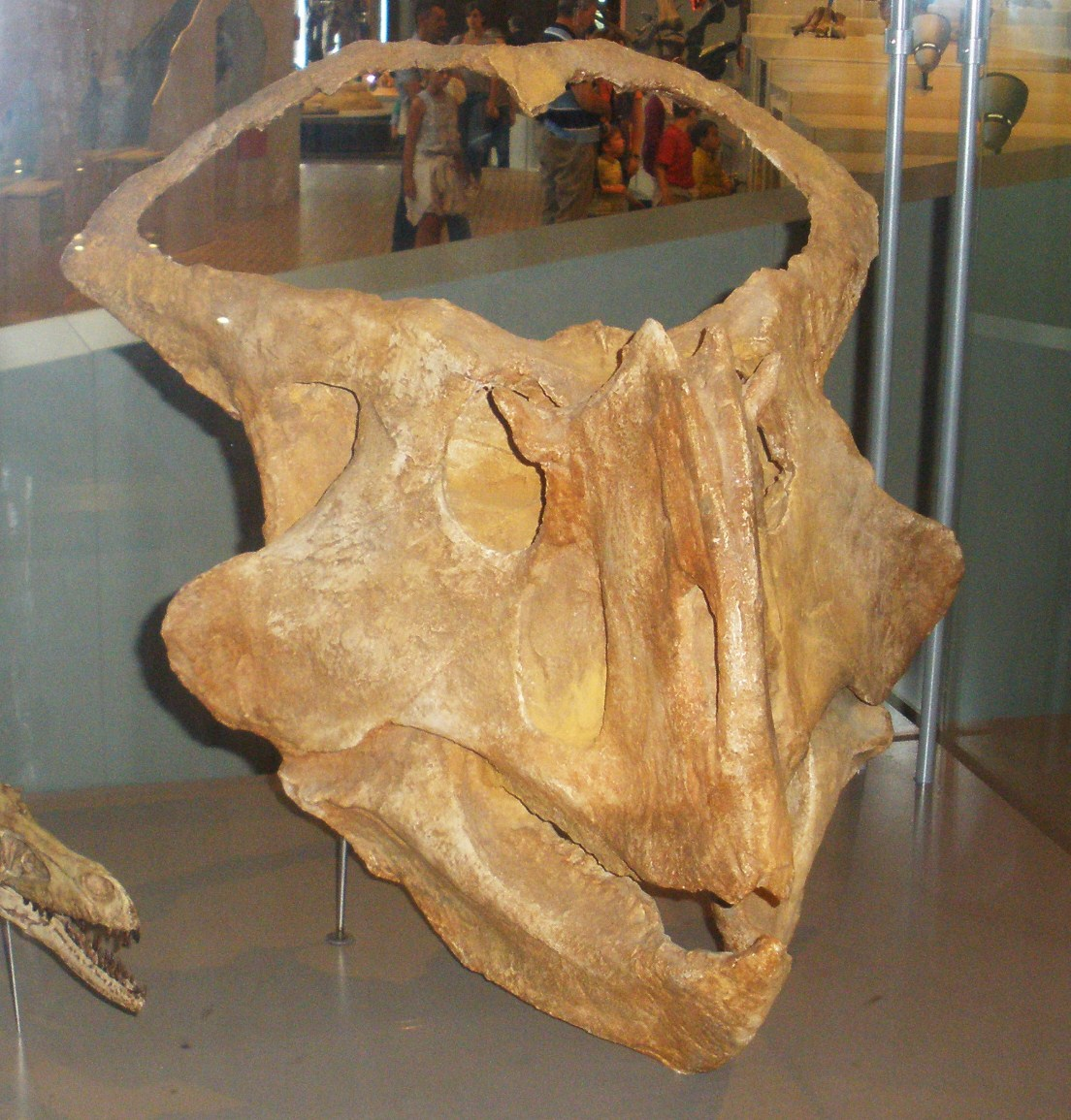
Skull of Protoceratops hellenikorhinus

- Tereshchenko reported that Protoceratops andrewsi had sexual dimorphism in its body in addition to its head.
- Lambert and others reported sexual dimorphism in Protoceratops hellenikorhinus.
- Holmes and others found that the two Chasmosaurus species argued to be valid by Godfrey and Holmes are found at different positions within the stratigraphic column of the Dinosaur Park Formation. This finding bolstered the idea that these species were distinct after all. They also described a new species, Chasmosaurus irvinensis, which was discovered in Dinosaur Park Formation rocks deposited more recently than either previously described Chasmosaurus species.
- Peter J. Makovicky formally described the braincase attributed to the small ceratopsian dinosaur Montanoceratops cerorhynchus. This specimen is currently cataloged as AMNH 5244. Makovicky found that it shares anatomical features with Leptoceratops gracilis. The shared features between the two taxa's braincases contradicts previous phylogenetic studies which had suggested that they were not closely related. M. cerorhynchus had been previously known from the contemporary St. Mary River Formation and Makovicky's referral of AMNH 5224 to the species expanded its known paleobiogeographic range. Makovicky performed a phylogenetic analysis to clarify the relationship between ceratopsian in the light of the new braincase data. Makovicky concluded from his analysis that at least three dispersal events from Asia to North America are required to explain the paleobiogeography of neoceratopsians. The patterns of distribution and dispersal are similar to those found in other contemporary taxa like oviraptorosaurs, troodonts, and multituberculate mammals.

Neoceratopsian relationships reexamined

Neoceratopsian relationships reexamined

- Ornithischia
  - Marginocephalia
    - Ceratopsia
      - - Neoceratopsia
          - - - Coronosauria
                - - Ceratopsoidea
                    - Ceratopsidae
                      - Centrosaurus apertus
                      - Triceratops horridus
                    - Zuniceratops christopheri
                - - Bagaceratops rozhdeventskyi
                  - Protoceratops andrewsi
              - Microceratops gobiensis
            - Leptoceratopsidae
              - - - Udanoceratops tschzhovi
                  - Leptoceratops gracilis
              - Asiaceratops salsopaludalis
          - Archaeoceratops oshimai
        - Psittacosaurus mongoliensis
      - Chaoyangosaurus youngi
    - Stegoceras validus
  - Hypsilophodon foxi

A phylogenetic hypothesis proposed by Peter J. Makovicky based on new data obtained from the holotype and braincase of M. cerorhynchus.

==== 2002 ====
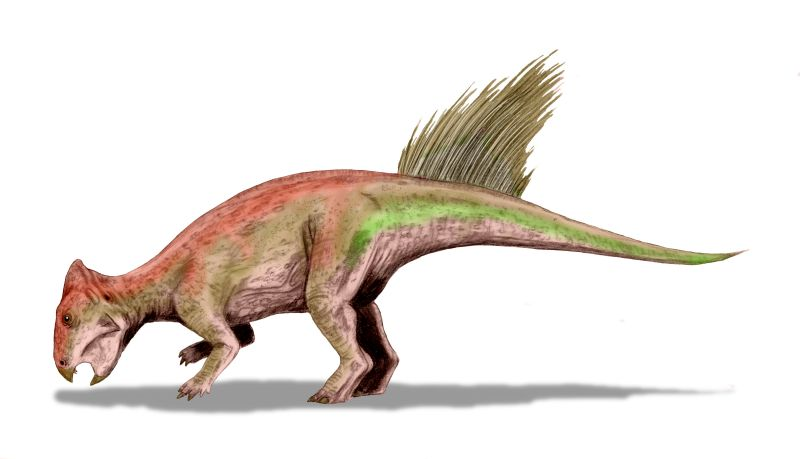
Artistic restoration of Liaoceratops

- Swisher and others dated the Psittacosaurus fossils of the Yixian Formation to near the Barremian-Aptian boundary based on Argon-Argon radiometric dating.
- Xu and others described the new genus and species Liaoceratops yangzigouensis.
- Makovicky re-examined the type specimen of Turanoceratops. Nessov had claimed that this genus was a ceratopsid because it had horns and teeth with two roots, but Makovicky found that the teeth were single rooted after all and the supposed eye-horn may actually have come from and armored dinosaur. Since it had no good distinguishing traits, Makovicky regarded the genus as dubious.

==== 2003 ====
- Tereschenko and Alifanov described the new genus and species Bainoceratops efremovi.
- Alifanov described the new genus and species Lamaceratops tereschenkoi.
- You and Dong described the new genus and species Magnirostris dodsoni.
- Alifanov described the new genus and species Platyceratops tatarinovi.
- You, Xu, and Wang described the new genus and species Hongshanosaurus houi.
- Rich and Vickers-Rich described the new genus and species Serendipaceratops arthurcclarkei.

==== 2004 ====
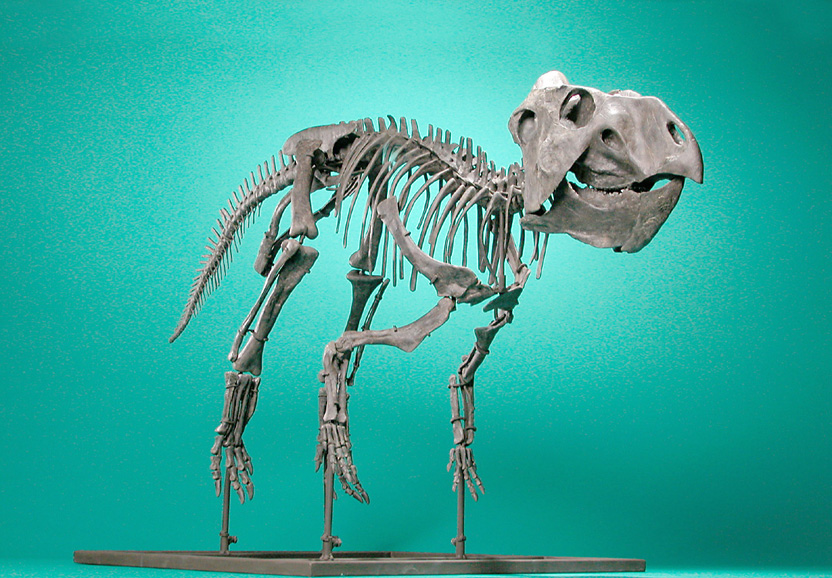
Skeletal mount of Prenoceratops

- Chinnery described the new genus and species Prenoceratops pieganensis.

==== 2005 ====
- You and others described the new genus and species Auroraceratops rugosus.

==== 2006 ====
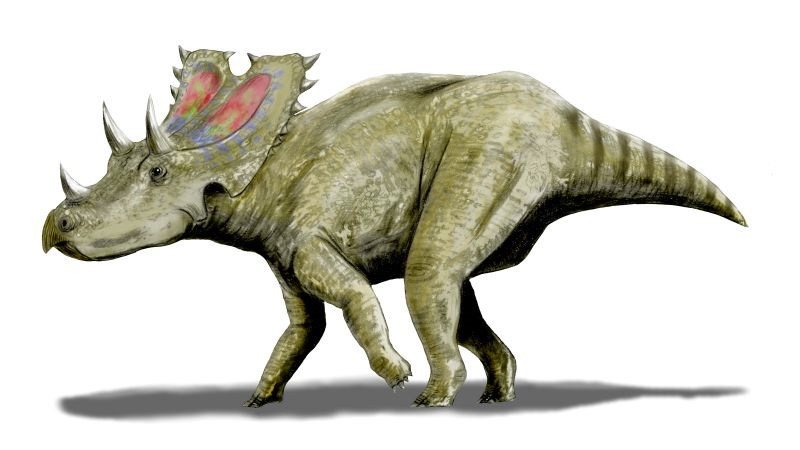
Artistic restoration of Agujaceratops

- Lucas, Sullivan and Hunt described the new genus Agujaceratops.
- Zhao and others described the new genus and species Xuanhuaceratops niei.
- Makovicky and Norell described the new genus and species Yamaceratops dorngobiensis.
- Xu and others described the new genus and species Yinlong downsi.

==== 2007 ====
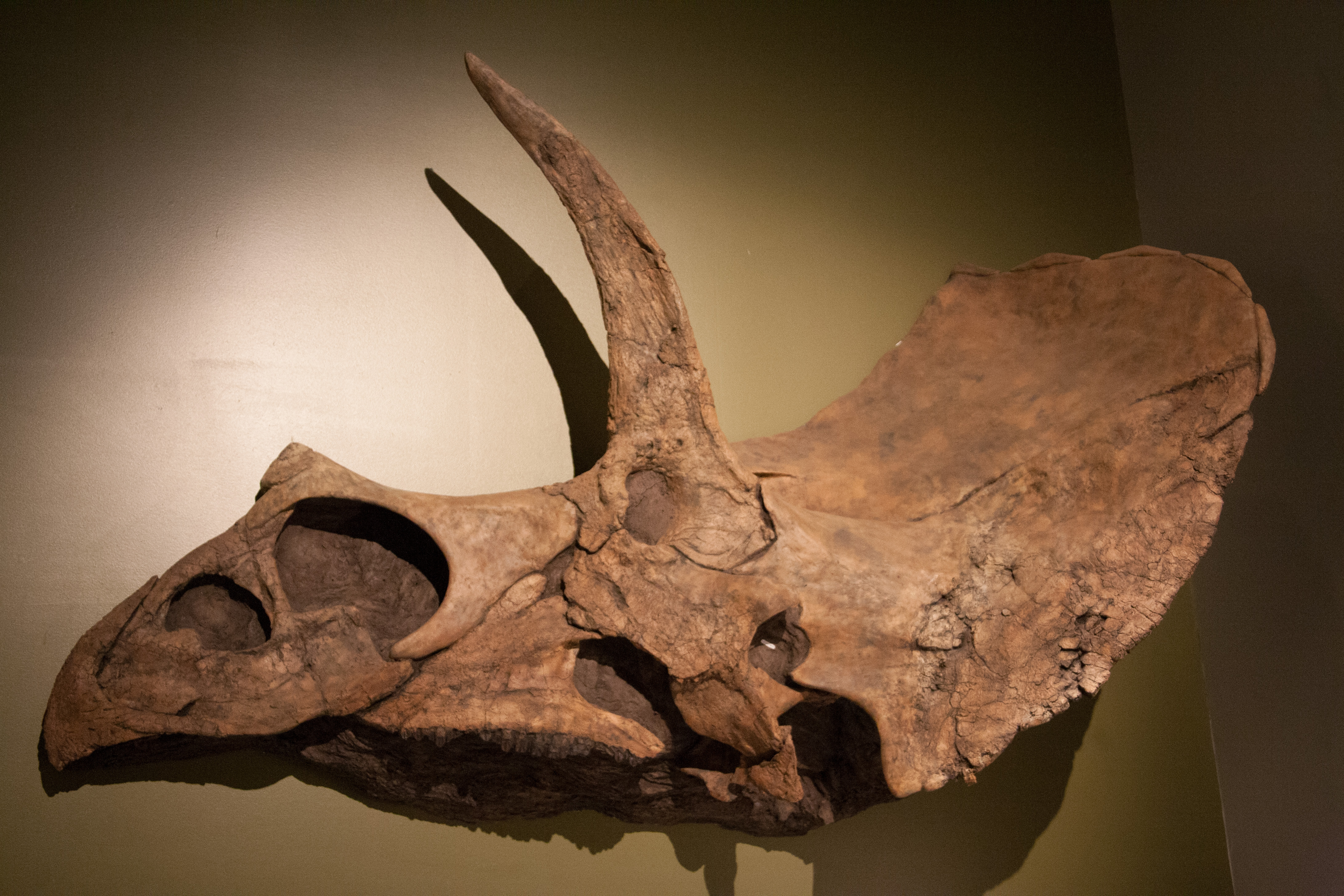
Skull of Eotriceratops

- Ryan described the new genus and species Albertaceratops nesmoi.
- Chinnery and Horner described the new genus and species Cerasinops hodgskissi.
- Andrey Sergeevich Ukrainsky renamed the genus Diceratops to Nedoceratops because the previous name was taken by a hymenopteran.
- Wu and others described the new genus and species Eotriceratops xerinsularis.

==== 2008 ====
- Mateus named the new genus Diceratus to replace Diceratops, however unbeknownst to him it had already been renamed the year before to Nedoceratops.
- Alifanov described the new genus and species Gobiceratops minutus.
- Mateus described the new genus Microceratus.

==== 2009 ====
- Ohashi and Barrett described the new genus and species Albalophosaurus yamaguchiorum.
- Jin and others described the new genus and species Helioceratops brachygnathus.

=== 2010s ===
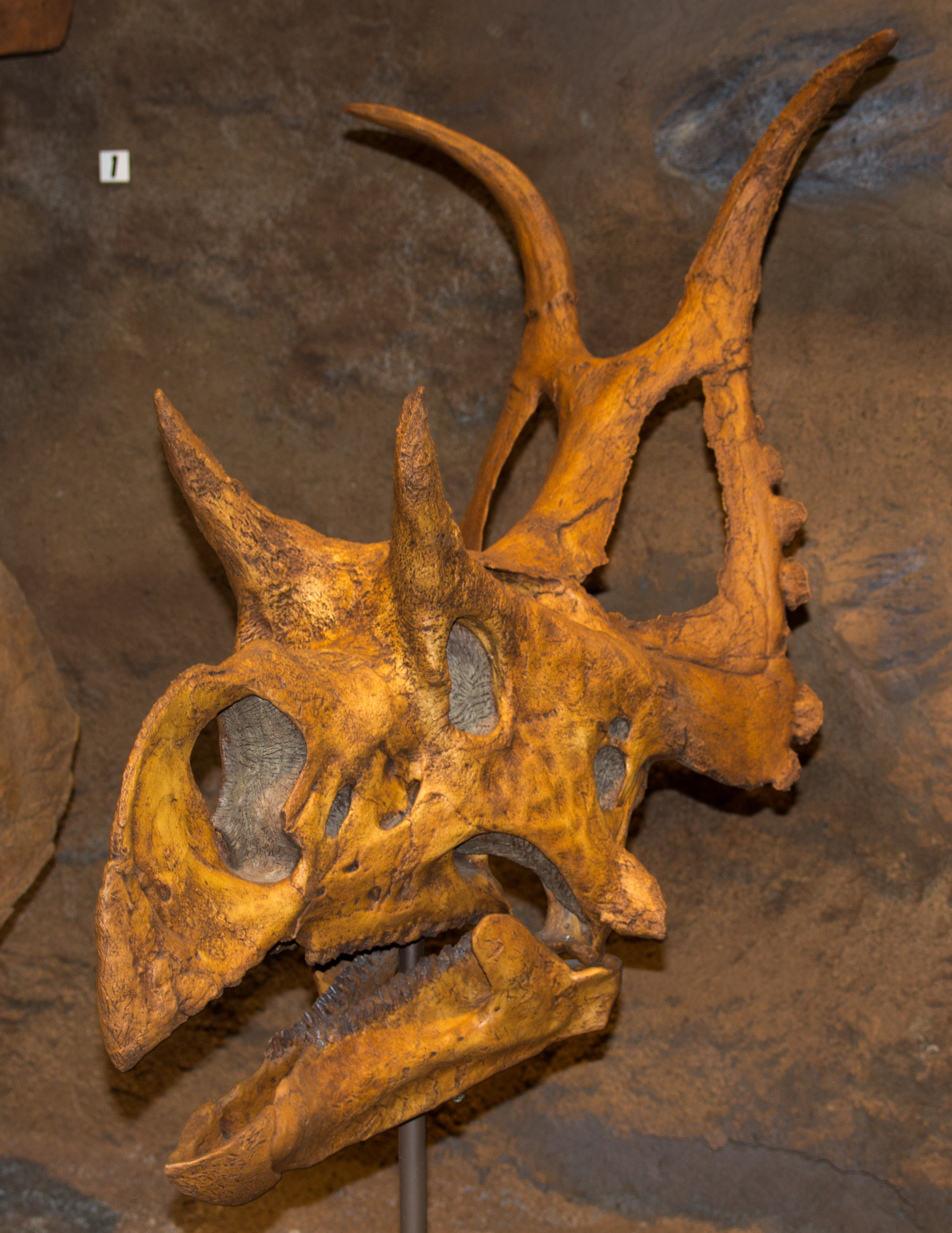
Skull of Diabloceratops eatoni

==== 2010 ====
- Attila Ősi, R.J. Butler, and David B. Weishampel described the new genus and species Ajkaceratops kozmai.
- Hai-Lu You, Kyo Tanque and Pete Dodson described the new genus and species Archaeoceratops yujingziensis.
- Loewen and others described the new genus and species Coahuilaceratops magnacuerna.
- J. I. Kirkland and D. D. DeBlieux described the new genus and species Diabloceratops eatoni.
- Sampson and others described the new genus and species Kosmoceratops richardsoni.
- Ryan, Russell and Hartman described the new genus and species Medusaceratops lokii.
- Longrich described the new genus and species Mojoceratops perifania.
- Sullivan and Lucas described the new genus and species Ojoceratops fowleri.
- Paul C. Sereno, Zhao Xijin, and Tan Lin. described the new species Psittacosaurus gobiensis.
- McDonald and Horner described the new genus Rubeosaurus.

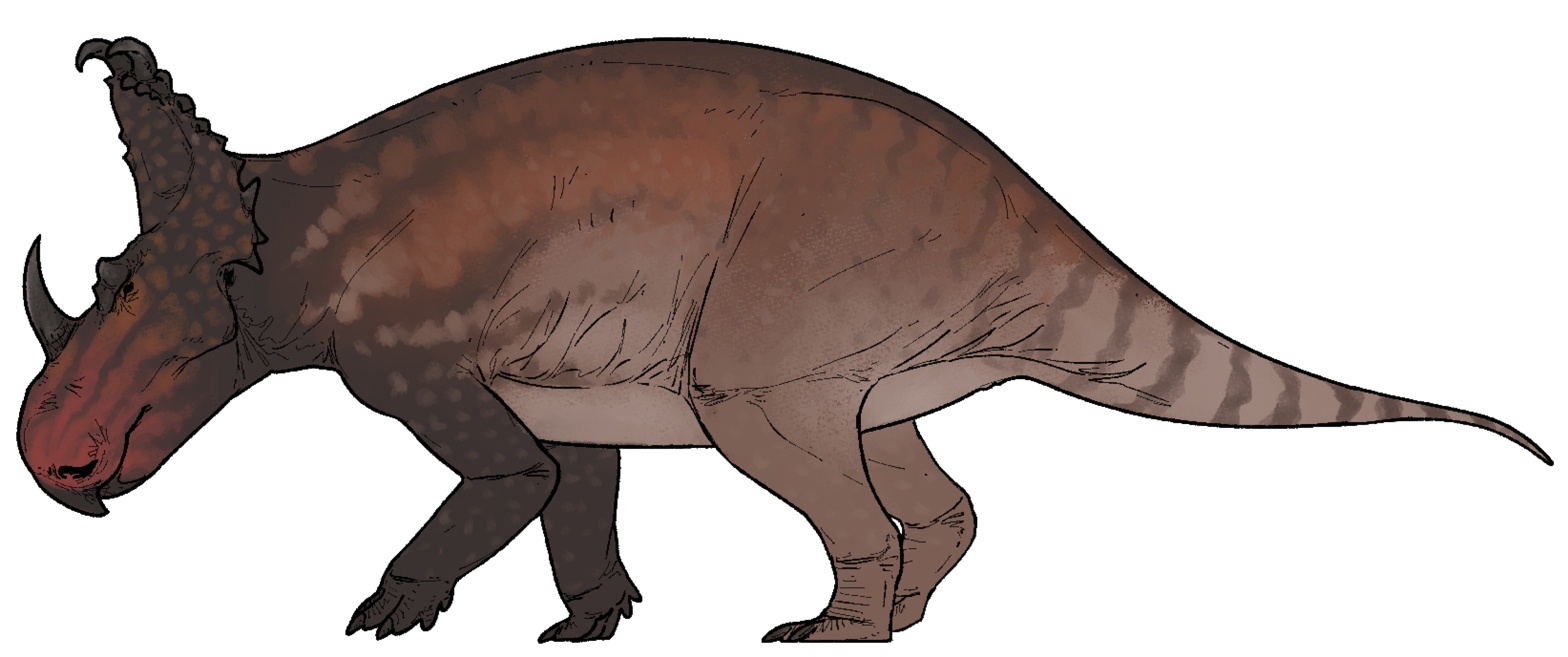
Artistic restoration of Sinoceratops

- Xu and others described the new genus and species Sinoceratops zhuchengensis.
- Ott and Larson described the new genus and species Tatankaceratops sacrisonorum.
- Sampson and others described the new genus and species Utahceratops gettyi.
- Sampson and others described the new genus Vagaceratops.
- Xu and others described the new genus and species Zhuchengceratops inexpectus.

==== 2011 ====
- Yuong-Nam Lee, Michael J. Ryan, and Yoshitsugo Kobayashi described the new genus and species Koreaceratops hwaseongensis.
- Farke and others described the new genus and species Spinops sternbergorum.
- Longrich described the new genus and species Titanoceratops ouranos.

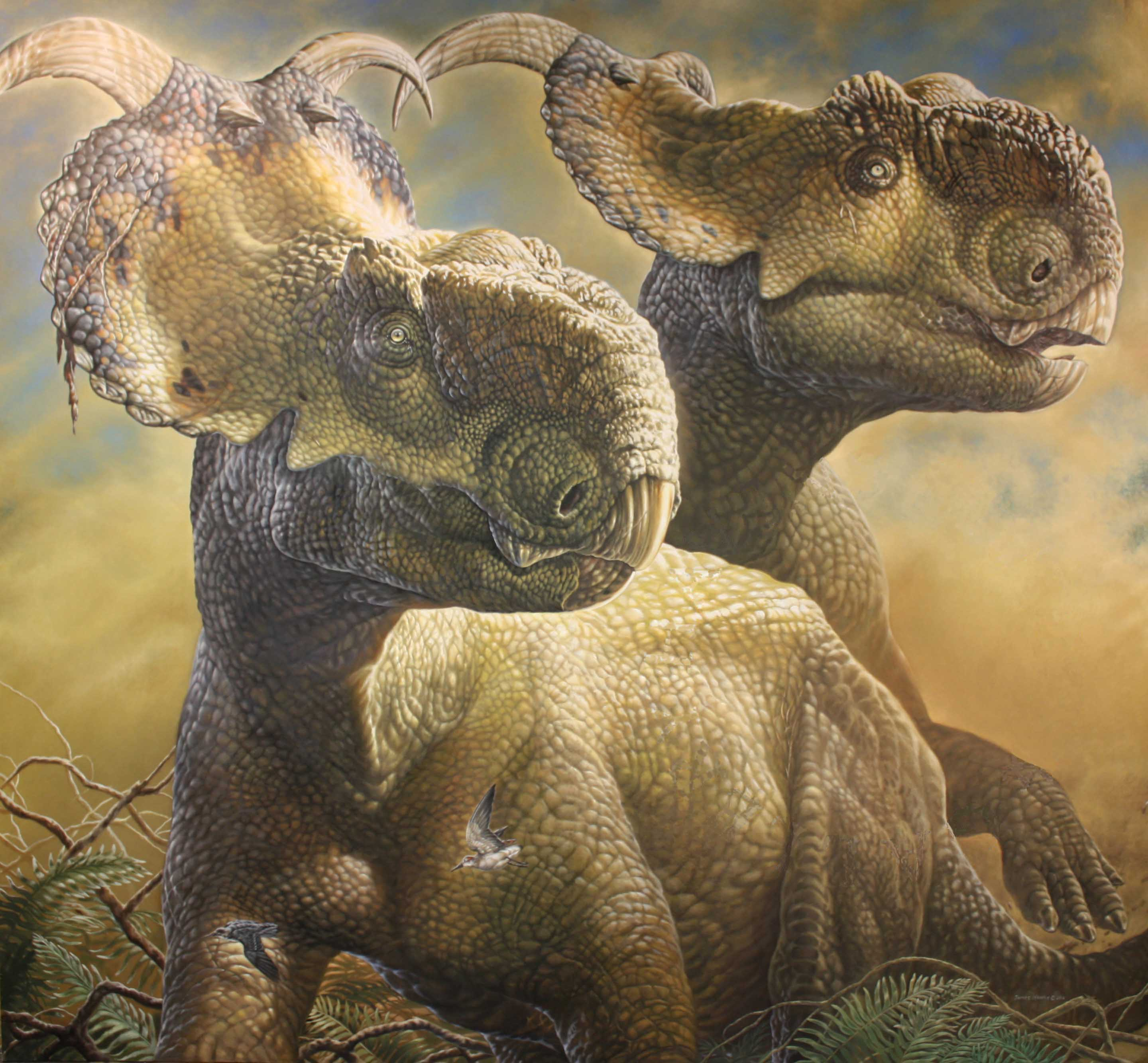
Pachyrhinosaurus perotorum pair

==== 2012 ====
- Ryan, Evans and Shepherd, described the new genus and species Coronosaurus brinkmani.
- Ryan and others described the new genera and species Gryphoceratops morrisoni and Unescoceratops koppelhusae.
- Fiorillo and Tykoski described the new species Pachyrhinosaurus perotorum.
- Ryan, Evans and Shepherd described the new genus and species Xenoceratops foremostensis.

==== 2013 ====
- Wick and Lehman described the new genus and species Bravoceratops polyphemus.
- Longrich described the new genus and species Judiceratops tigris.
- Sampson and others described the new genus and species Nasutoceratops titusi.

==== 2014 ====
- Ryan and others described the new genus and species Mercuriceratops gemini.
- Longrich described the new species Pentaceratops aquilonius.
- Farke and others described the new genus and species Aquilops americanus.

==== 2015 ====
- Brown and Henderson described the new genus and species Regaliceratops peterhewsi.
- Zheng, Jin and Xu described the new genus and species Mosaiceratops azumai.
- Evans and Ryan described the new genus and species Wendiceratops pinhornensis
- Han and others described the new genus and species Hualianceratops wucaiwanensis.
- He and others described the new genus and species Ischioceratops zhuchengensis.

==== 2016 ====
- Mallon and others described the new genus and species Spiclypeus shipporum.
- Lund and others described the new genus and species Machairoceratops cronusi.
- Lehman, Wick and Barnes described the new species Agujaceratops mavericus.

==== 2017 ====
- Rivera-Sylva and others described the new genus and species Yehuecauhceratops mudei.
- Andrew Farke and George Philips described evidence of ceratopsidae in Appalachia.

==== 2018 ====
- Dalman and others described the new genus and species Crittendenceratops krzyzanowskii.

==== 2019 ====
- A study on bone histology of Psittacosaurus lujiatunensis through its ontogeny is published by Zhao et al. (2019).
- A three-dimensional virtual endocast of a member of the genus Auroraceratops is reconstructed on the basis of a well-preserved skull by Zhang et al. (2019).
- A study on the nature of the observed variation in morphology and size of skulls of Bagaceratops rozhdestvenskyi will be published by Czepiński (2019), who considers the species Gobiceratops minutus, Lamaceratops tereschenkoi, Platyceratops tatarinovi and Magnirostris dodsoni to be junior synonyms of B. rozhdestvenskyi.
- A study on the bone histology and skeletal growth of Avaceratops and Yehuecauhceratops is published by Hedrick et al. (2019).
- New information on the anatomy of the skeleton of Pachyrhinosaurus perotorum is presented by Tykoski, Fiorillo & Chiba (2019), who also provide a new diagnosis of this species.
- Arbour and Evans described the new genus and species Ferrisaurus sustutensis.
- Napoli and others described the new species Psittacosaurus amitabha.

=== 2020s ===
==== 2020 ====
- Fowler and Freedman Fowler described the new genera and species Navajoceratops sullivani and Terminocavus sealeyi.

==== 2022 ====
- Dalmon and others describe the new genus and species Sierraceratops turneri.

== See also ==
- History of paleontology
  - Timeline of paleontology
