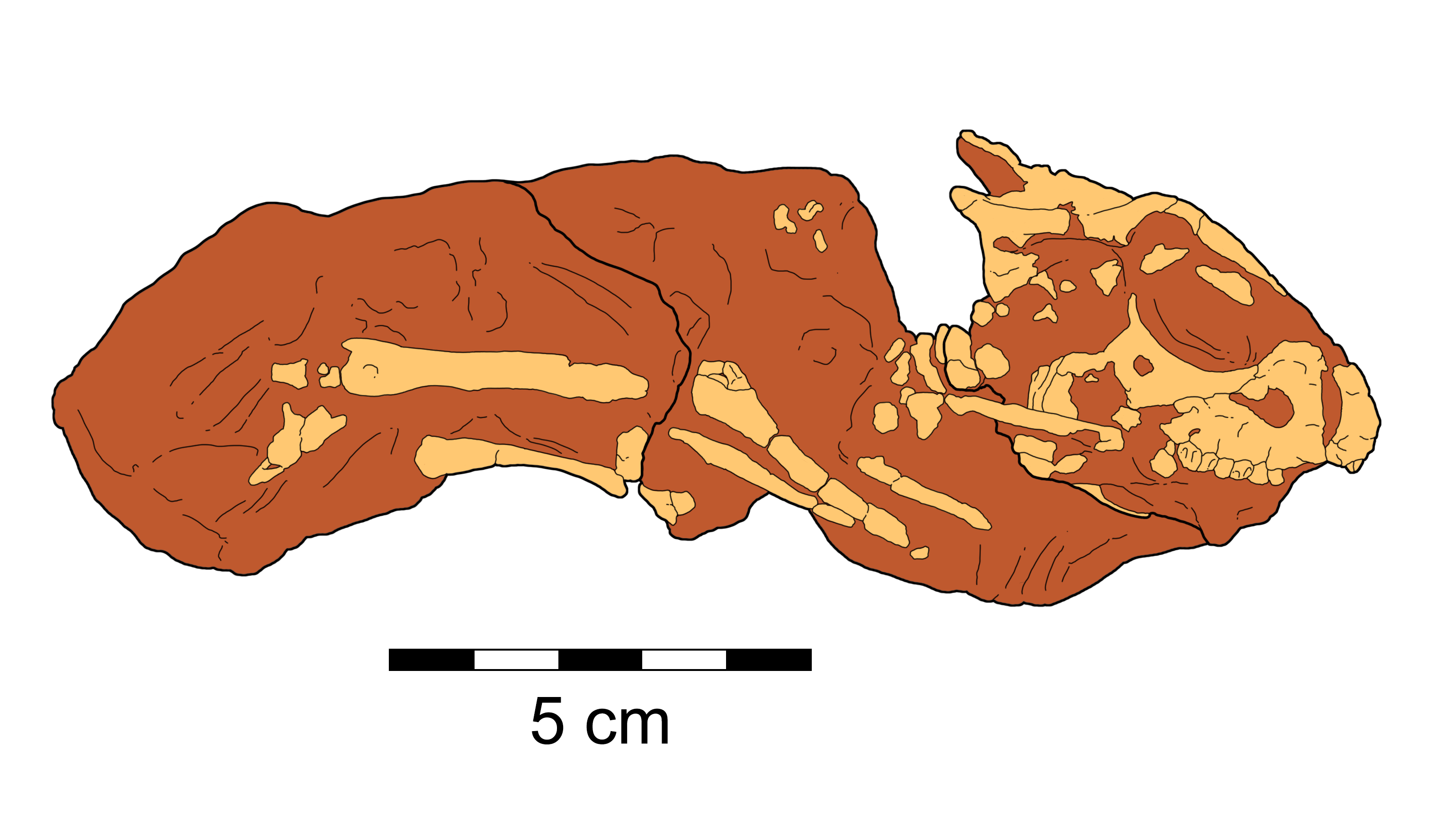
- Line diagram of the holotype

Scientific classification
- Domain: Eukaryota
- Kingdom: Animalia
- Phylum: Chordata
- Clade: Dinosauria
- Clade: †Ornithischia
- Clade: †Coronosauria
- Family: †Protoceratopsidae
- Genus: †Breviceratops; Kurzanov, 1990

Type species
- †Breviceratops kozlowskii (Maryańska & Osmólska, 1975)

Synonyms
- Protoceratops kozlowskii Maryańska & Osmólska, 1975

= Breviceratops =

Breviceratops Temporal range: Late Cretaceous, Campanian

Protoceratopsid dinosaur genus from the Late Cretaceous

Breviceratops (meaning "short horned face") is a genus of protoceratopsid dinosaur that lived during the Late Cretaceous in what is now the Barun Goyot Formation, Mongolia.

== Discovery and naming ==
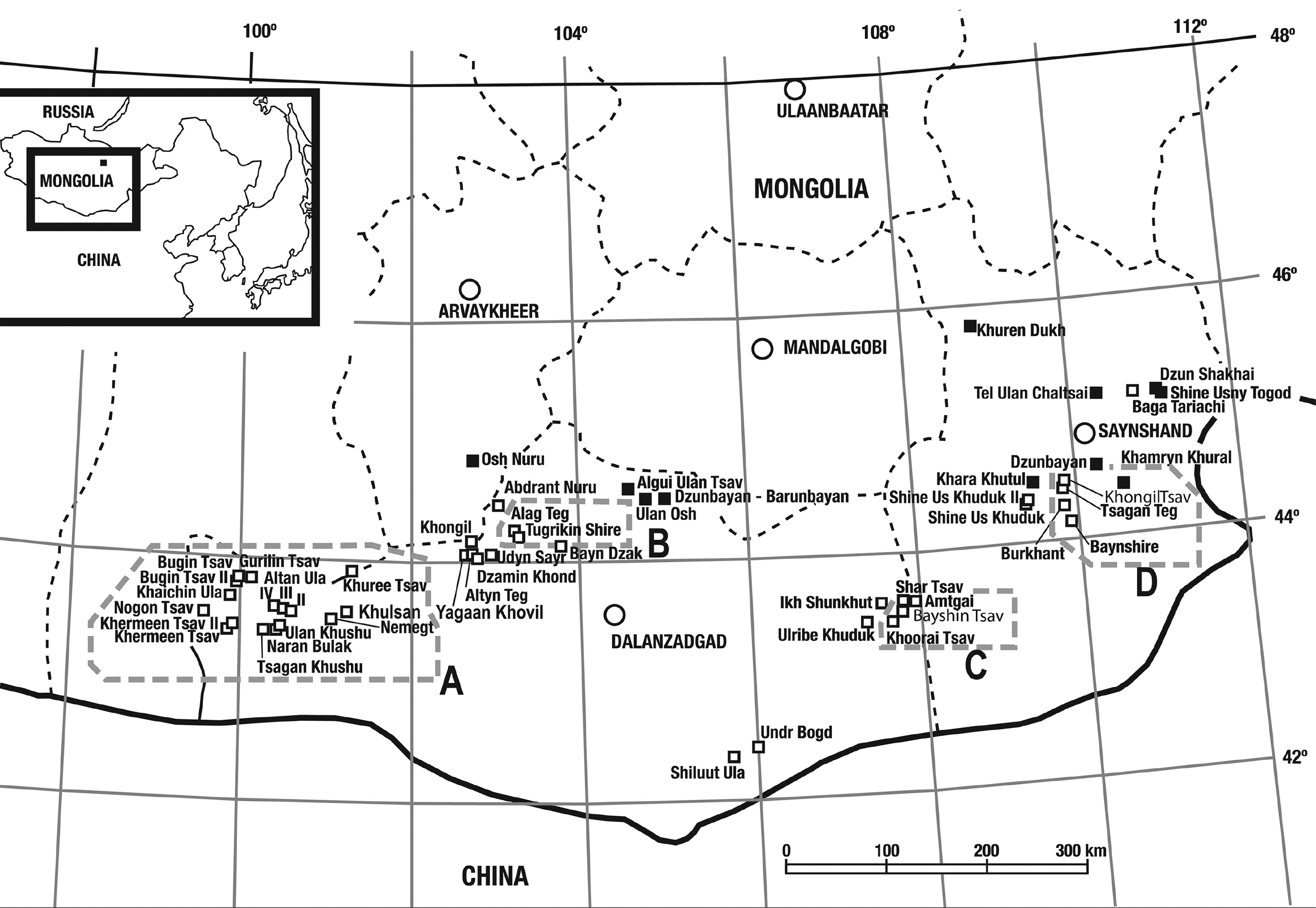
Fossil localities in Mongolia. Breviceratops fossils have been collected at Khulsan (area A)

The first fossils were discovered during the 1960s by the Polish expedition to the Nemegt Basin of Gobi Desert. The specimens were originally described by Teresa Maryańska and Halszka Osmólska in 1975 and named as a second species of Protoceratops, Protoceratops kozlowskii, the specific name honouring Polish paleontologist Roman Kozłowski.

The holotype, ZPAL MgD-I/117, was found in the Khulsan locality of the Barun Goyot Formation dating from the Late Campanian. It consists of a partial juvenile postcranial skeleton with skull. Other specimens were referred from the Hermiin Tsav and Khulsan localities: MgD-I/116, a skull and lower jaws of a small juvenile; MgD-I/118, fragmentary postcrania and lower jaws of a juvenile; MgD-I/119, a dentary and three neural arches; MgD-I/20, two dentaries and loose teeth; MgD-I/21, a maxilla fragment with four teeth of a juvenile; and MgD-I/22, teeth.

They were then renamed as a separate genus, Breviceratops, by Sergei Mikhailovich Kurzanov in 1990, the generic name combining the Latin brevis (meaning short), with a reference to the Ceratopsia. Kurzanov also referred an additional number of fossils from Hermiin Tsav, which is the type locality of Bagaceratops, a coeval protoceratopsid. The Hermiin Tsav material has been noted as closely resembling Bagaceratops, which has led to the proposal that Breviceratops is a juvenile stage and synonym of this protoceratopsid. However, the holotype from Khulsan has primitive premaxillary teeth, a feature inconsistent with the derived morphology of Bagaceratops. Most of these referred specimens have been re-identified as belonging to Bagaceratops, and Breviceratops is now restricted to the holotype, plus ZPAL MgD-I/116.

== Description ==
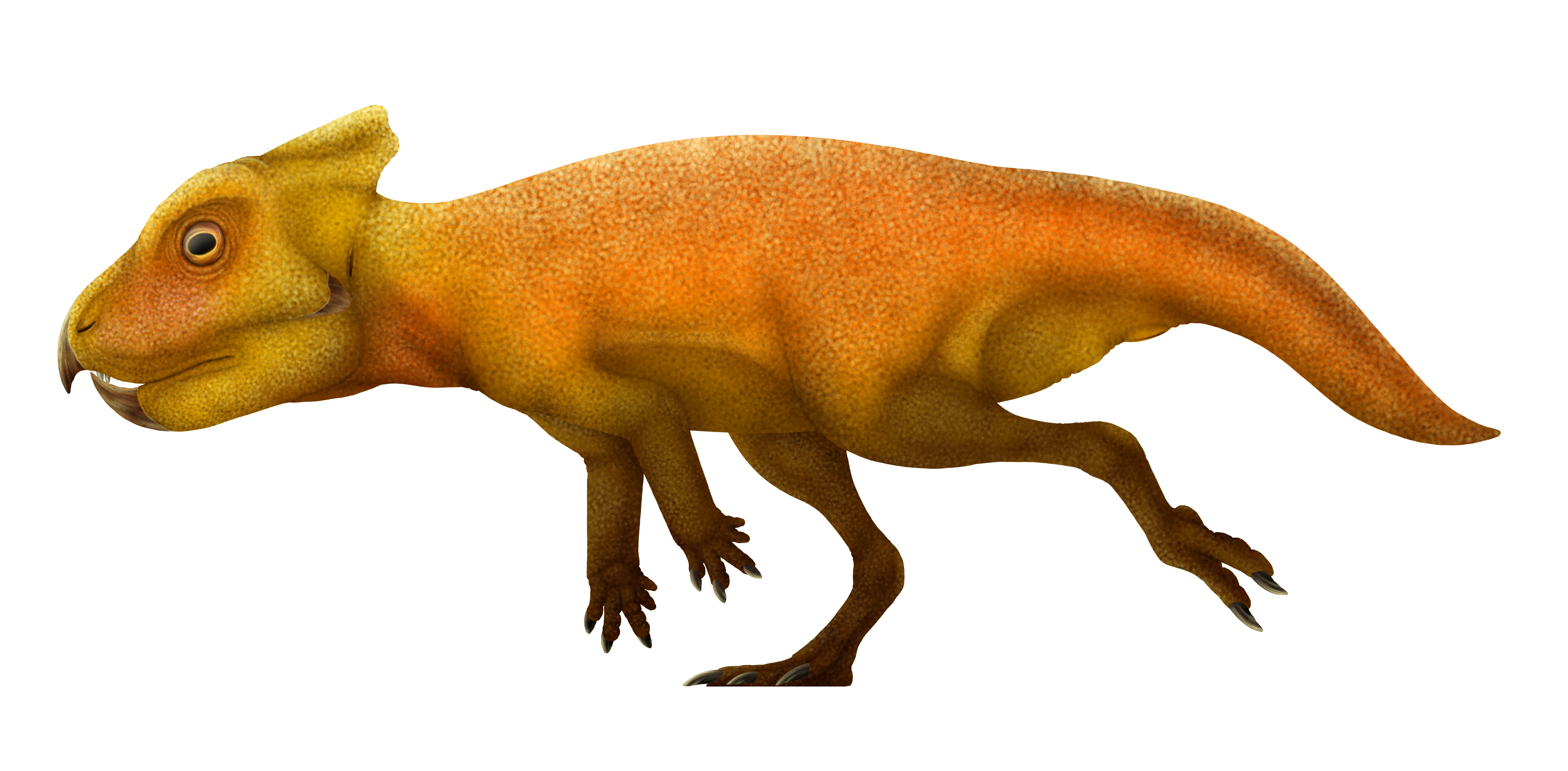
Life restoration

Breviceratops had a skull combining primitive and derived traits, such as premaxillary teeth (also shared with Protoceratops andrewsi) and an antorbital fenestra (also shared with Bagaceratops), which is an opening of the maxilla located in front of the eye socket. This fenestra was distinct from Bagaceratops in that it was narrow to straight-shaped. The skull of Breviceratops ended in a moderatively pronounced neck frill formed by the parietal and squamosal, a common trait among protoceratopsids and overall ceratopsians.

== Classification ==
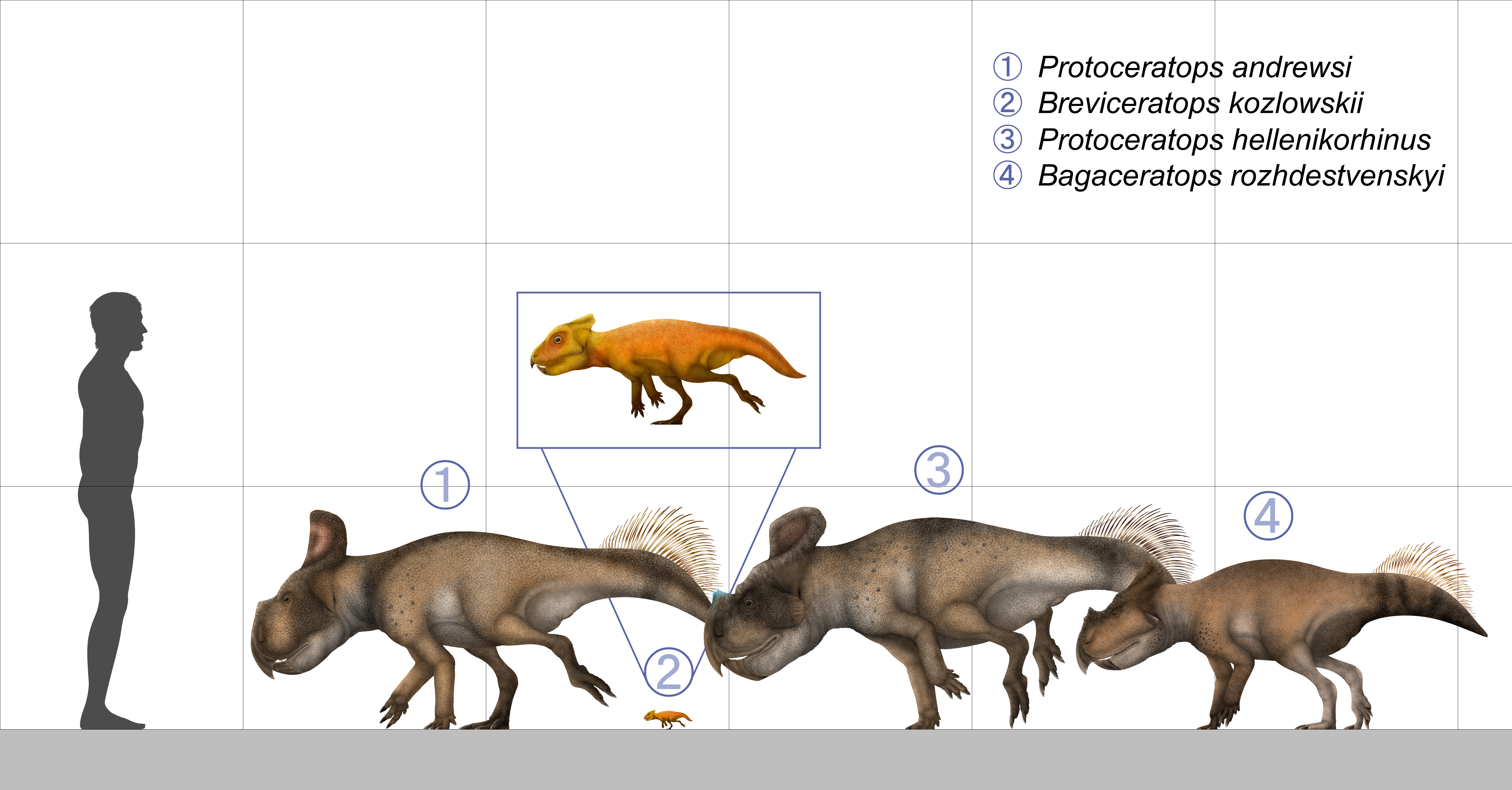
Protoceratopsidae size comparison, Breviceratops in (2)

Breviceratops belonged to the Ceratopsia, a group of herbivorous dinosaurs with parrot-like beaks which thrived in North America and Asia during the Cretaceous period. It has been assigned to the Protoceratopsidae in 2019 by Łukasz Czepiński, were Bagaceratops and Protoceratops appear to be close relatives. Below are the proposed relationships among Protoceratopsidae by Czepiński:

- Protoceratopsidae
  - - Protoceratops andrewsi
    - - Protoceratops hellenikorhinus
      - - Breviceratops
        - - Bagaceratops

== See also ==
- Timeline of ceratopsian research
