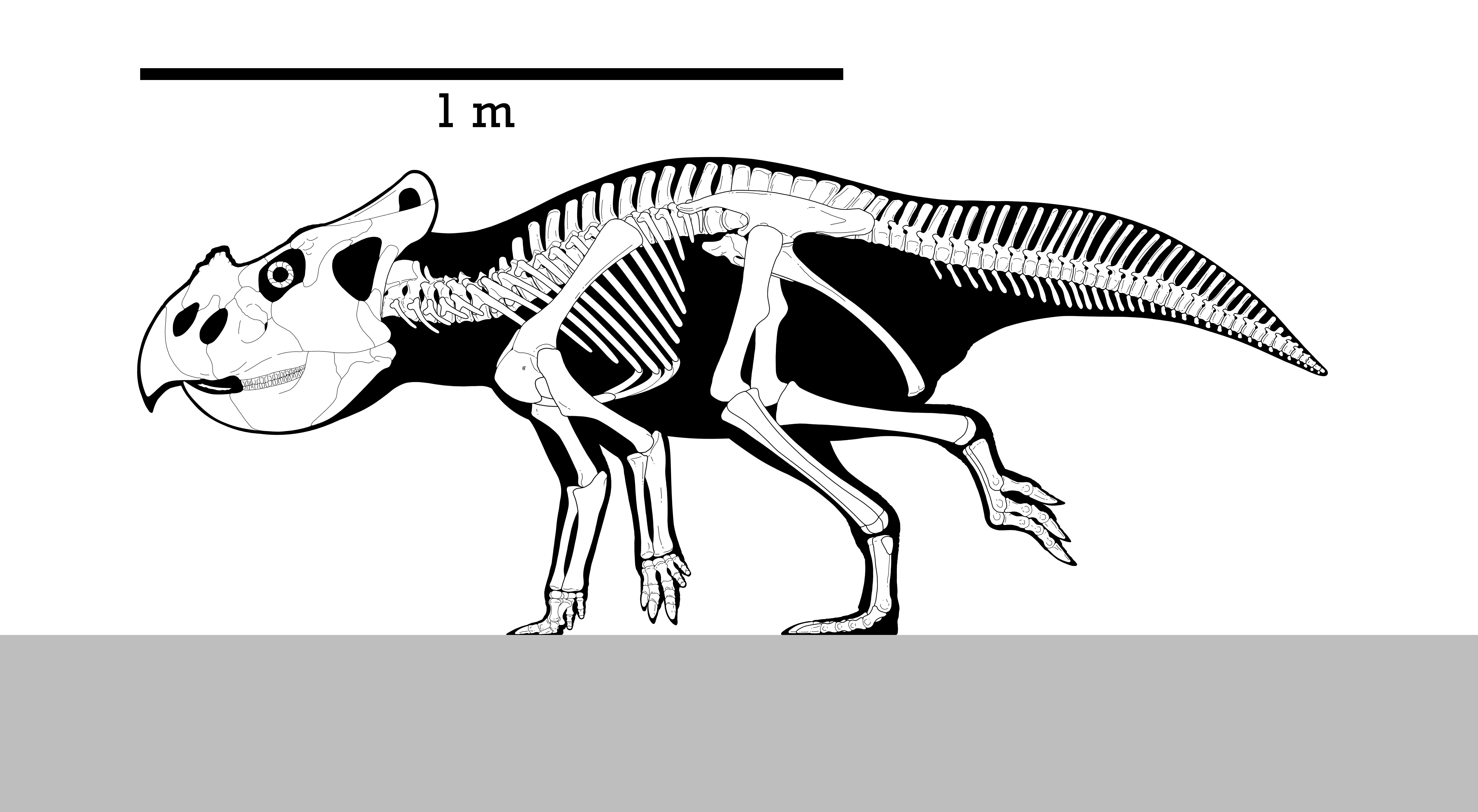
- Skeletal reconstruction (including elements previously described as Magnirostris)

Scientific classification
- Kingdom: Animalia
- Phylum: Chordata
- Class: Reptilia
- Clade: Dinosauria
- Clade: †Ornithischia
- Clade: †Ceratopsia
- Clade: †Coronosauria
- Family: †Protoceratopsidae
- Genus: †Bagaceratops; Maryanska & Osmolska, 1975

Type species
- †Bagaceratops rozhdestvenskyi Maryanska & Osmolska, 1975

Synonyms
- Gobiceratops minutus Alifanov, 2008; Lamaceratops tereschenkoi Alifanov, 2003; Magnirostris dodsoni You & Dong 2003; Platyceratops tatarinovi Alifanov, 2003

= Bagaceratops =

Bagaceratops Temporal range: Late Cretaceous, ~72–71 Ma

Protoceratopsid dinosaur genus from the Late Cretaceous

Bagaceratops (meaning "small-horned face") is a genus of small protoceratopsid dinosaurs that lived in Asia during the Late Cretaceous, around 72 to 71 million years ago. Bagaceratops remains have been reported from the Barun Goyot Formation and Bayan Mandahu Formation. One specimen may argue the possible presence of Bagaceratops in the Djadochta Formation.

Bagaceratops was among the smallest ceratopsians, growing up to 1–1.5 m (3.3–4.9 ft) in length, with a weight about 22.7–45 kg (50–99 lb). Although emerging late in the reign of the dinosaurs, Bagaceratops had a fairly primitive anatomy—when compared to the much derived ceratopsids—and kept the small body size that characterized early ceratopsians. Unlike its close relative, Protoceratops, Bagaceratops lacked premaxillary teeth (cylindrical, blunt teeth near the tip of the upper jaw).

== History of discovery ==
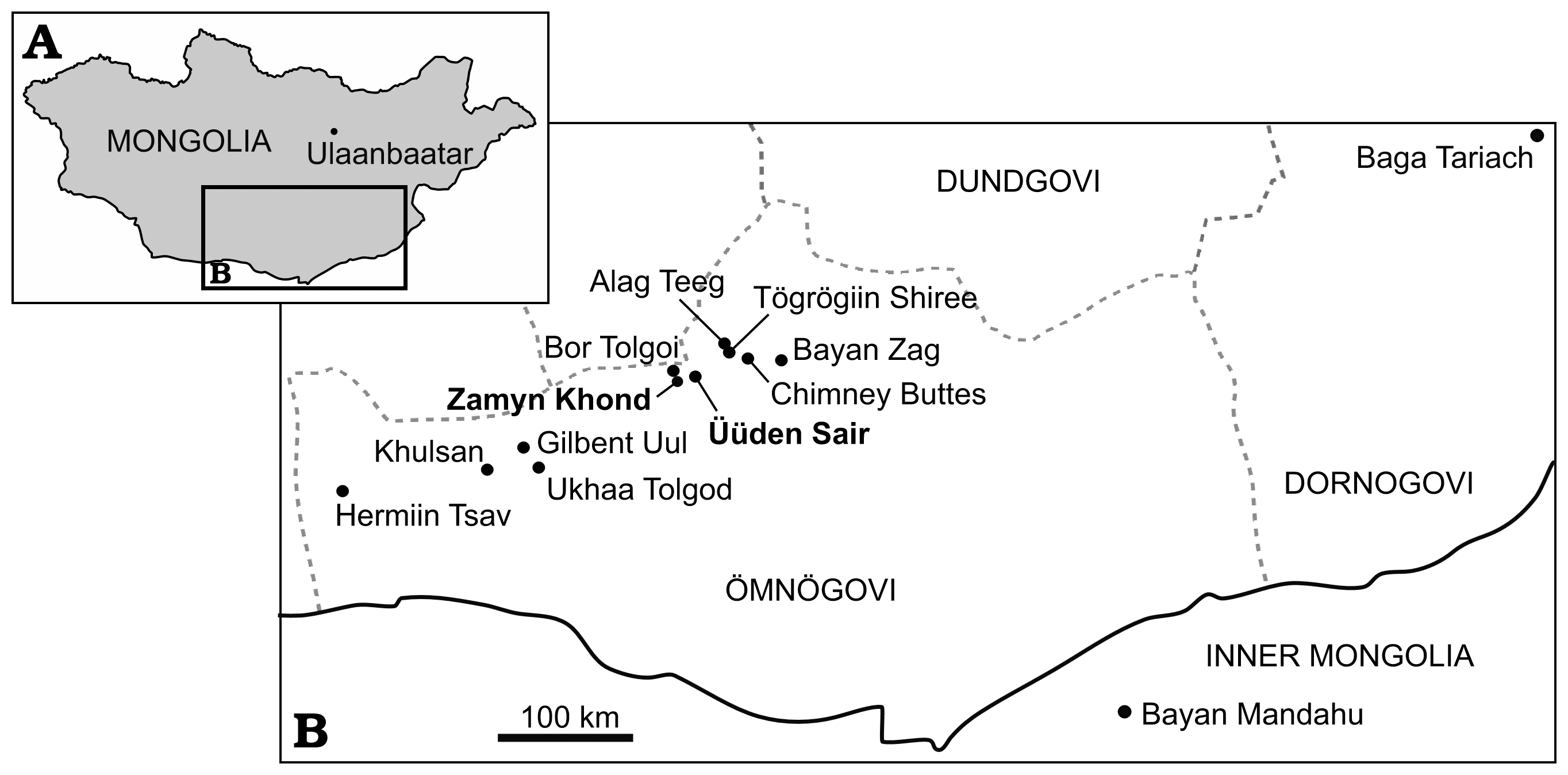
Fossil localities of Mongolia and the location of Bayan Mandahu; Bagaceratops fossils have been reported from the Bayan Mandahu (bottom right), Hermiin Tsav, Khulsan (both left), and possibly Udyn Sayr (center) localities

During the large field work of the Polish-Mongolian Palaeontological Expeditions in the 1970s, abundant protoceratopsid specimens were discovered on eroded surfaces of the Hermiin Tsav locality of the Barun Goyot Formation, Gobi Desert. This newly collected and rich fossil material is stored in the Institute of Paleobiology of the Polish Academy of Sciences (Poland). In 1975, two of the expedition's leading scientists, namely Polish paleontologists Teresa Maryańska and Halszka Osmólska, published a large monograph dedicated to describe this material where they named the new genus and type species of protoceratopsid Bagaceratops rozhdestvenskyi. The selected holotype is ZPAL MgD-I/126, which consists of a relatively medium-sized skull, and a vast majority of the specimens collected by the expeditions were assigned to Bagaceratops, including juvenile and sub-adult skulls. The generic name, Bagaceratops, means "small-horned face" and is derived from the Mongolian baga = meaning small; and Greek ceratops = meaning horn face. The specific name, B. rozhdestvenskyi, is named in honor of the Russian paleontologist Anatoly Konstantinovich Rozhdestvensky for his notorious work on dinosaurs.

=== Additional specimens ===
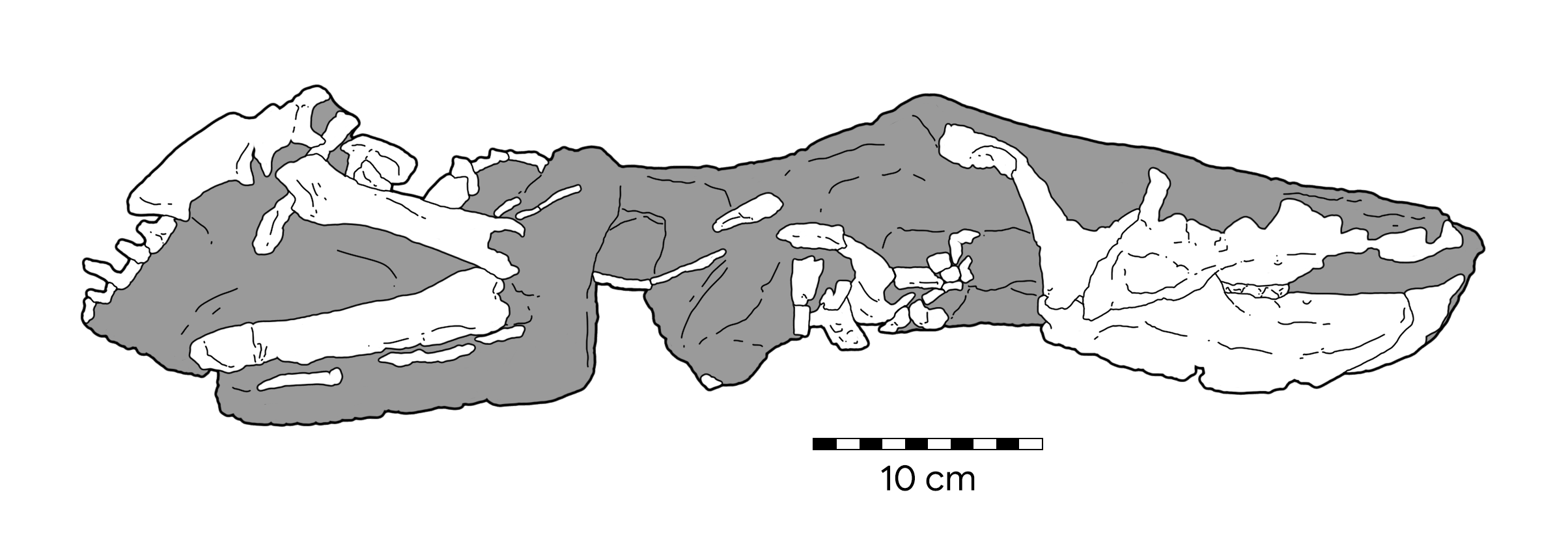
Diagram of Bagaceratops KID 196

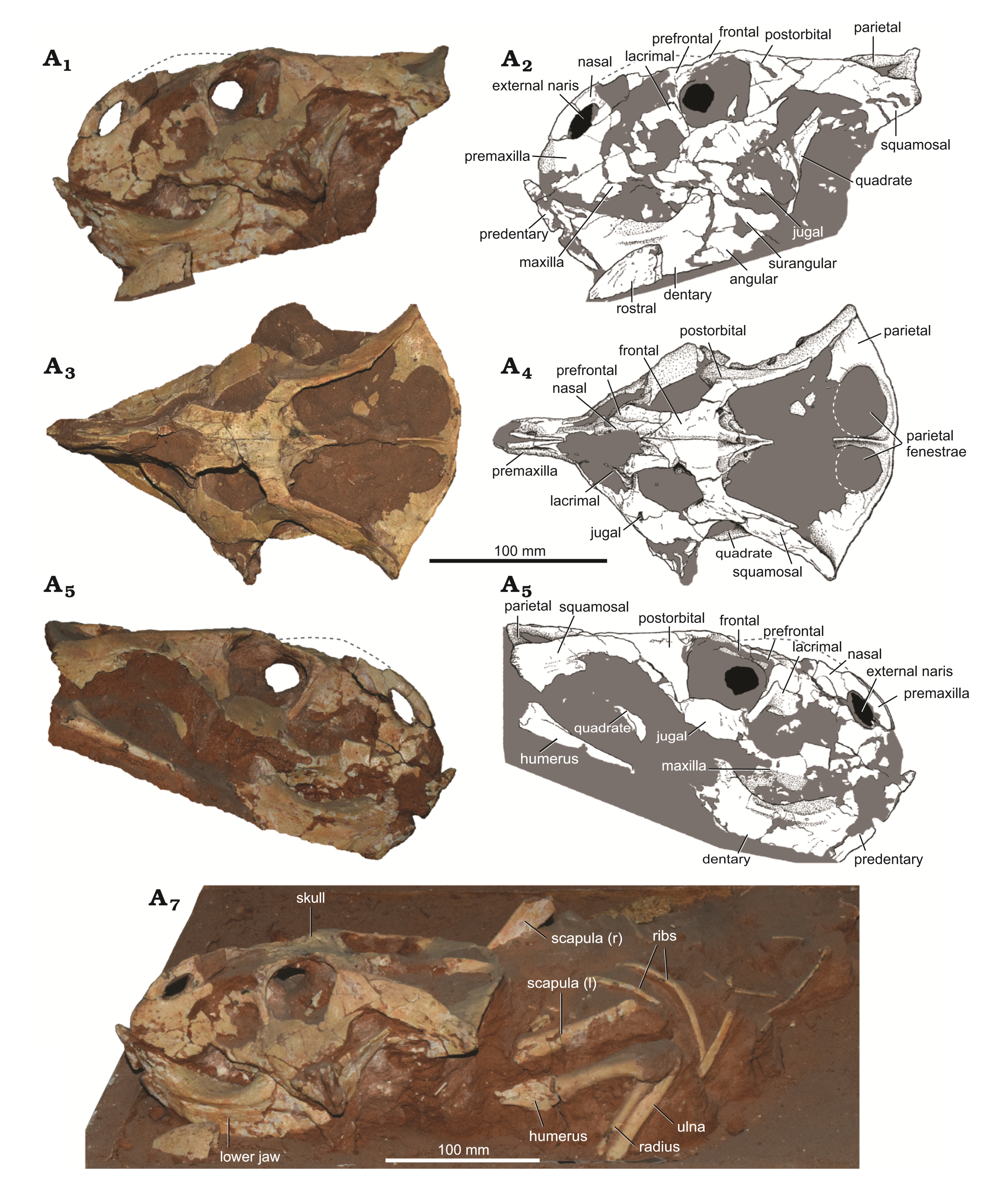
Bagaceratops specimen MPC-D 100/551B, which belongs to an indeterminate species

In 1993, the Japan-Mongolia Joint Paleontological Expedition collected an articulated and nearly complete Bagaceratops skeleton (MPC-D 100/535) from the Barun Goyot Formation at the Hermiin Tsav locality. In 2010 and 2011 this specimen was examined to analyze several borings (tunnel-like holes) left by invertebrate scavengers on joint areas. As of 2019, MPC-D 100/535 remains largely undescribed. In 2019 a partial skeleton (specimen KID 196) of Bagaceratops was described by Bitnara Kim and colleagues, who noted no significant differences between the skeleton of Protoceratops and the former, with the exception of the anatomy of the skull and the shape and location of the clavicles. This specimen was discovered in 2007 also from the Hermiin Tsav locality of the Barun Goyot Formation, and includes a partially preserved skull with partial skeleton of an adult individual.

In 2020, Czepiński described new specimens of Bagaceratops and Protoceratops from the Udyn Sayr and Zamyn Khond localities, respectively, of the Djadochta Formation, and evaluated the implications of these specimens for correlation of fossil sites of the latter formation. He considered one of these specimens in particular, MPC-D 100/551B, as a potential evidence of an anagenetic transition from Protoceratops andrewsi to Bagaceratops rozhdestvenskyi.

=== Synonyms ===
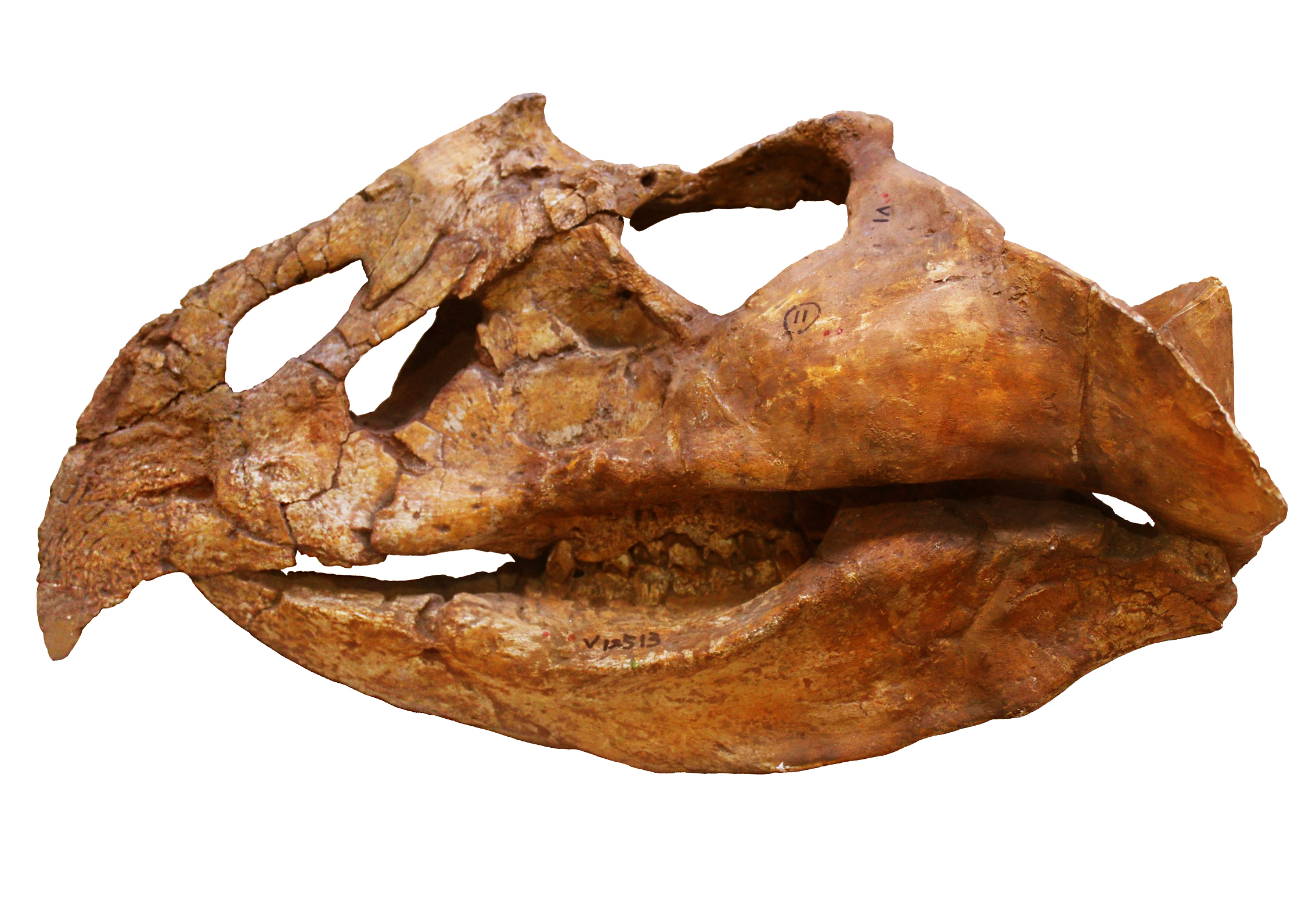
Holotype skull of Magnirostris

Juvenile remains, at first tentatively named Protoceratops kozlowskii, and then renamed Breviceratops kozlowskii by Kurzanov in 1990, were considered to be juvenile Bagaceratops. Paul Sereno in 2000 explained this by extrapolating that the juvenile Breviceratops would grow into a mature Bagaceratops.

In 2003 Russian paleontologist Vladimir R. Alifanov named the new taxa Lamaceratops tereschenkoi and Platyceratops tatarinovi from the Barun Goyot Formation. Material assigned by Alifanov corresponds to the holotype of Lamaceratops (PIN 4487/26; a partial small-sized skull), recovered from the Khulsan locality, and the holotype of Platyceratops (PIN 3142/4; an almost complete medium-sized skull), found in the red beds of the Hermiin Tsav locality. He also coined the family Bagaceratopidae in order to contain these new taxa and Bagaceratops. Also during 2003, You Hailu and Dong Zhiming described and named the new genus and species of protoceratopsid Magnirostris dodsoni from red beds at the Bayan Mandahu locality of the Bayan Mandahu Formation, Inner Mongolia (China). The holotype of Magnirostris, IVPP V12513, represents a nearly complete skull lacking the frill region of a large individual and was collected during expeditions led by the Sino-Canadian Dinosaur Project. In 2006 Mackoviky regarded all of these ceratopsians as junior synonyms of Bagaceratops based on the reasoning that all exhibit anatomical traits already seen on other specimens of this protoceratopsid, and some of them are likely products of preservation.

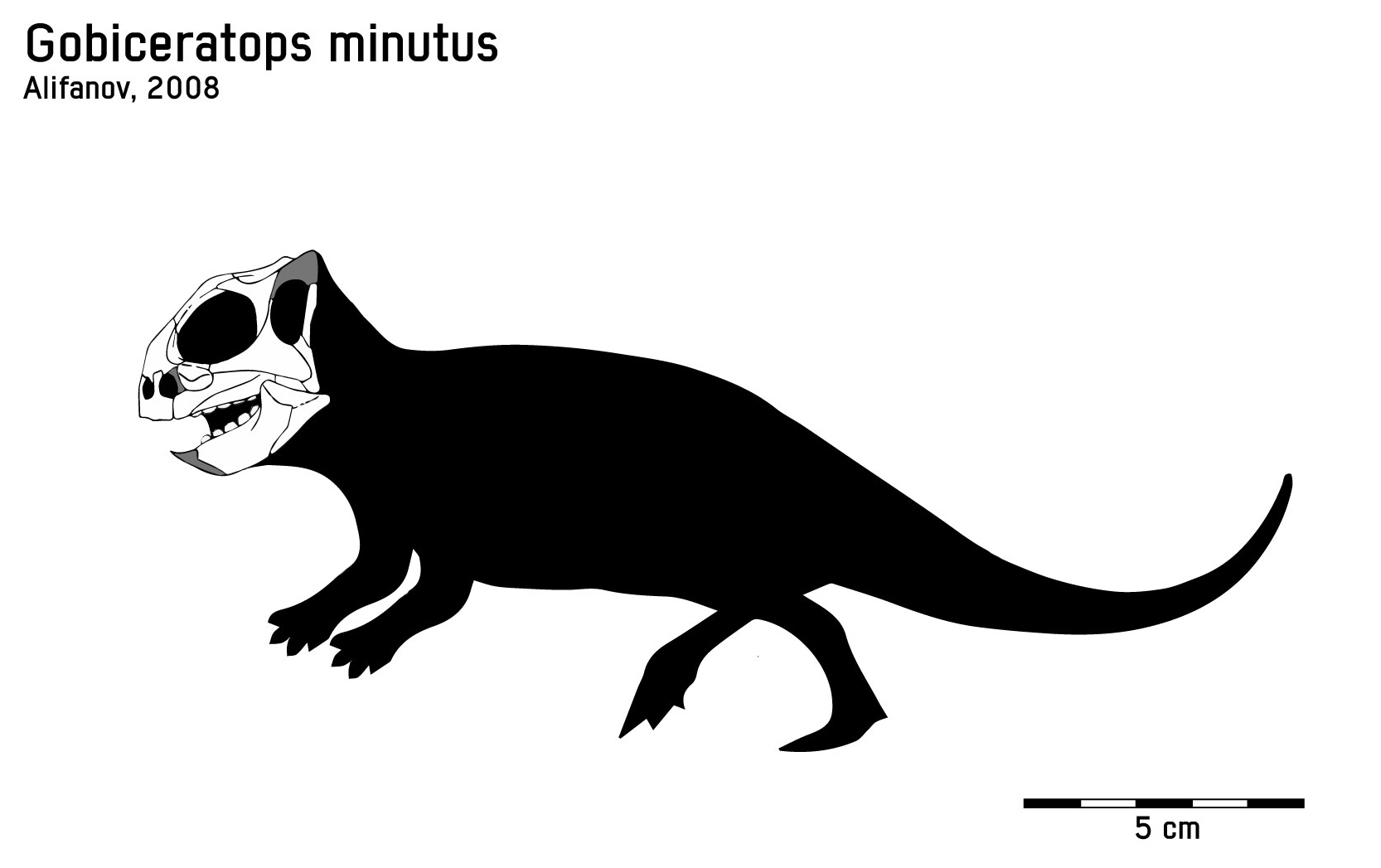
Skeletal diagram featuring the known elements of Gobiceratops

In 2008 Alifanov described and named another ceratopsian taxon from the Barun Goyot Formation, Gobiceratops minutus. Its holotype (PIN 3142/299) is represented by a very small and juvenile skull that was collected from the Hermiin Tsav locality near the end of the 1970s by the Joint Soviet–Mongolian Paleontological Expedition. Though Alifanov used this skull to erect the new Gobiceratops, it had already been displayed for several years at the Moscow Paleontological Museum under the name Bagaceratops rozhdestvenskyi.

A comprehensive study on the intraspecific variation in morphology of B. rozhdestvenskyi was conducted by Polish paleontologist Łukasz Czepiński in 2019, where he concluded that the previously named Gobiceratops minutus, Lamaceratops tereschenkoi, Platyceratops tatarinovi and Magnirostris dodsoni represent additional specimens and growth stages of B. rozhdestvenskyi and therefore, junior synonyms. Czepiński reexamined many of the specimens originally described by Maryańska and Osmólska, as well as the respective holotypes of these taxa, providing evidence that all traits used to separate them are, in fact, indistinguishably present on Bagaceratops and they fall within the large intraspecific variation of this taxon. He also considered Breviceratops to be a distinct and separate genus of protoceratopsid, from both Bagaceratops and Protoceratops, as it features a combination of basal (primitive) and derived (advanced) traits.

== Description ==
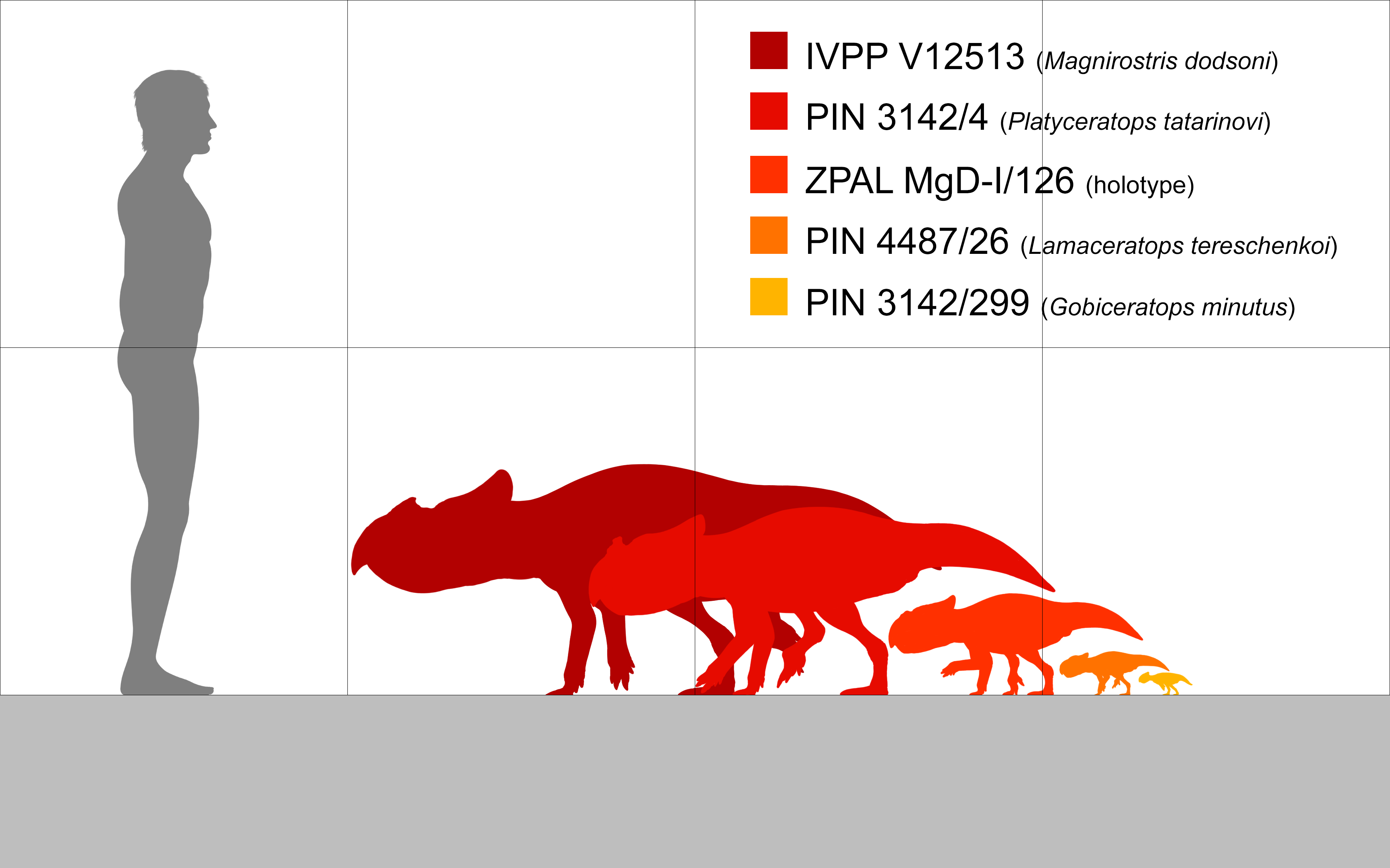
Bagaceratops specimens compared to a 1.8 m (5.9 ft) tall human

Bagaceratops was a small-sized protoceratopsid, reaching adult dimensions of about 1–1.5 m (3.3–4.9 ft) in length and 22.7–45 kg (50–99 lb) in body mass based on Maginostris. It had a smaller frill, about ten grinding teeth per jaw, and more triangular skull than its close relative, Protoceratops. Although both Bagaceratops and Protoceratops were very similar (mostly in the postcranial skeleton), the former had a much derived (advanced) skull morphology. Bagaceratops lacked primitive premaxillary teeth, had paired (fused) nasal bones, and an oval-shaped fenestra (hole) was developed in the maxilla—otherwise known as accessory antorbital fenestra.

== Classification ==
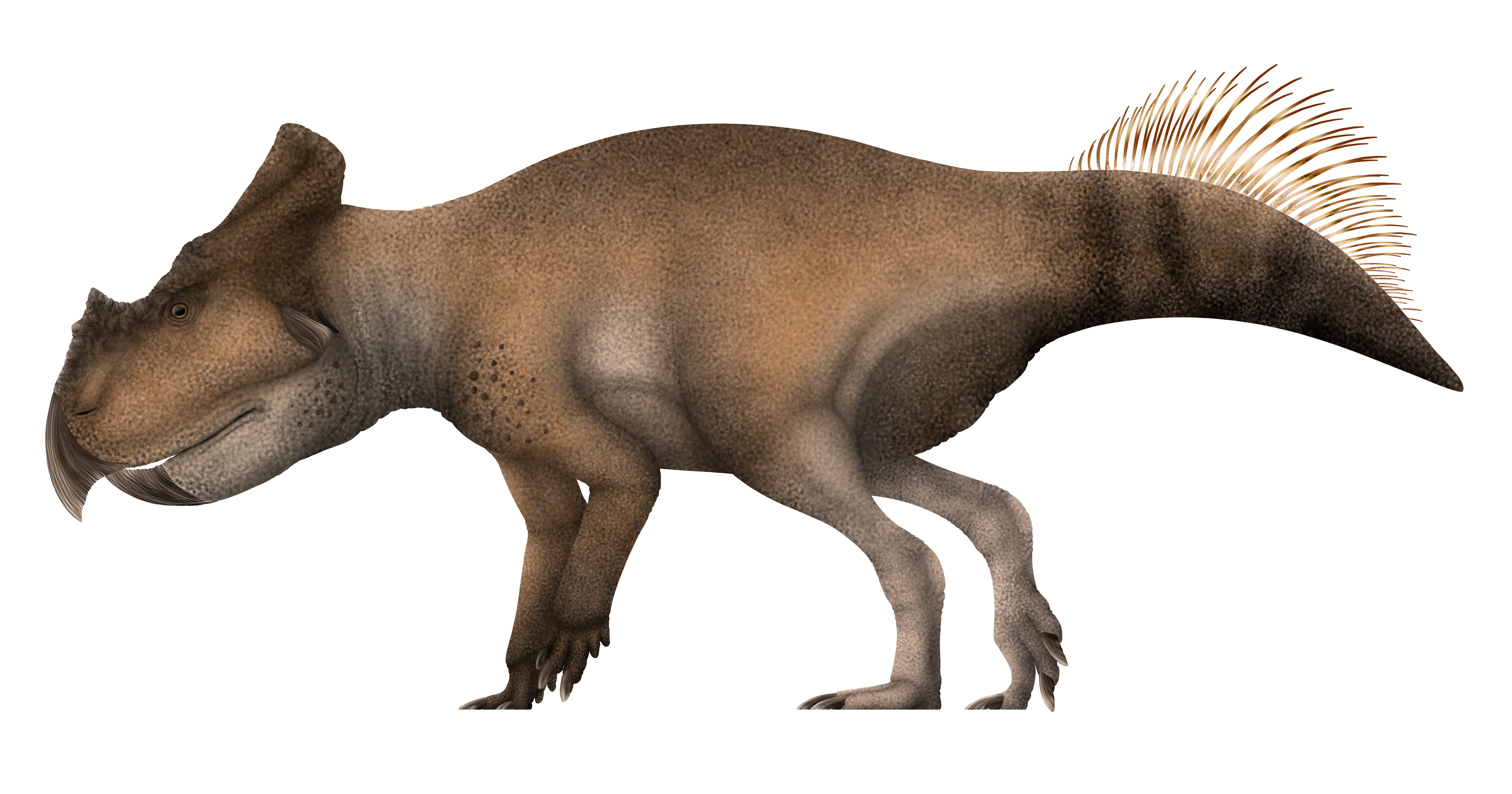
Life restoration

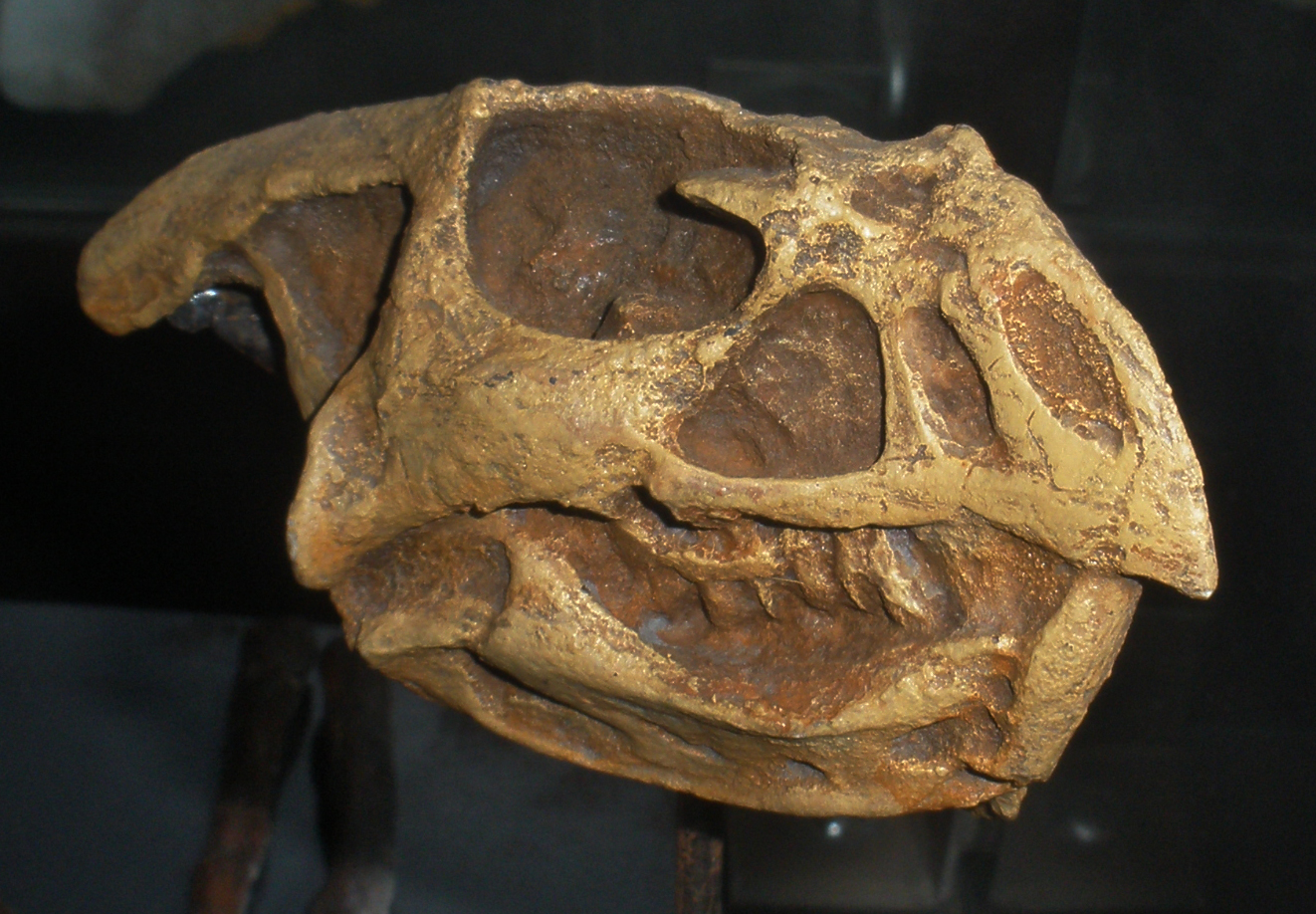
Skull cast of specimen PIN 3142/1

Bagaceratops belonged to Ceratopsia, a group of herbivorous dinosaurs with parrot-like beaks which thrived in North America and Asia during the Cretaceous Period, which ended roughly 66 million years ago.

In 2019 Czepiński analyzed a vast majority of referred specimens to the ceratopsians Bagaceratops and Breviceratops, and concluded that most were in fact specimens of the former. Although the genera Gobiceratops, Lamaceratops, Magnirostris, and Platyceratops, were long considered valid and distinct taxa, and sometimes placed within Protoceratopsidae, Czepiński found the diagnostic features used to distinguish these taxa to be largely present in Bagaceratops and thus becoming synonyms of this genus. Under this reasoning, Protoceratopsidae consists of Bagaceratops, Breviceratops, and Protoceratops. Based on cranial characters such as presence or absence of premaxillary teeth and an antorbital fenestra, P. andrewsi is the basal-most protoceratopsid and Bagaceratops the derived-most one. Below are the proposed phylogenetic relationships within Protoceratopsidae by Czepiński:

- Protoceratopsidae
  - - Protoceratops andrewsi
    - - Protoceratops hellenikorhinus
      - - Breviceratops
        - - Bagaceratops

== Paleoenvironment ==
=== Barun Goyot Formation ===
The Barun Goyot Formation, based on sediments, is regarded as Late Cretaceous in age (Middle-Upper Campanian) and has virtually yielded the bulk of material for which Bagaceratops is known. This formation is mostly characterized by series of red beds, mostly light-coloured sands (yellowish, grey-brown, and rarely reddish) that are locally cemented. Sandy claystones (often red-coloured), siltstones, conglomerates, and large-scale trough cross-stratification in sands are also common across the unit. In addition, structureless, medium-grained, fine-grained and very fine-grained sandstones predominate in sediments of the Barun Goyot Formation. The sediments of this formation were deposited in alluvial plain (flat land consisting of sediments deposited by highland rivers), lacustrine, and aeolian paleoenvironments, under relatively arid to semiarid climates.

Bagaceratops is the most common taxon across the Barun Goyot Formation, which was also home to many other vertebrates, including the ankylosaurids Saichania, Tarchia and Zaraapelta; alvarezsaurids Khulsanurus and Parvicursor; birds Gobipipus, Gobipteryx and Hollanda; fellow protoceratopsid Breviceratops; dromaeosaurids Kuru and Shri devi; halszkaraptorine Hulsanpes; pachycephalosaurid Tylocephale; and oviraptorids Conchoraptor, Heyuannia and Nemegtomaia. Other taxa are represented by the large titanosaur Quaesitosaurus, and a wide diversity of mammals and squamates.

=== Bayan Mandahu Formation ===
The Bayan Mandahu Formation, which yielded Magnirostris (now synonym of Bagaceratops), is considered to be Late Cretaceous in age, roughly Campanian. The dominant lithology is reddish-brown, poorly cemented, fine grained sandstone with some conglomerate, and caliche. Other facies include alluvial (stream-deposited) and aeolian (wind-deposited) sediments. It is likely that sediments at Bayan Mandahu were deposited by short-lived rivers and lakes on an alluvial plain with a combination of dune field paleoenvironments, under a semi-arid climate. The formation is known for its vertebrate fossils in life-like poses, most of which are preserved in unstructured sandstone, indicating a catastrophic rapid burial.

This formation has produced numerous dinosaurs, such as closely related protoceratopsid Protoceratops; ankylosaurid Pinacosaurus; alvarezsaurid Linhenykus; dromaeosaurids Linheraptor and Velociraptor; oviraptorids Machairasaurus and Wulatelong; and troodontids Linhevenator, Papiliovenator, and Philovenator. Other paleofauna from this unit comprises a variety of squamates and mammals, and nanhsiungchelyids turtles.

== See also ==
- Timeline of ceratopsian research
