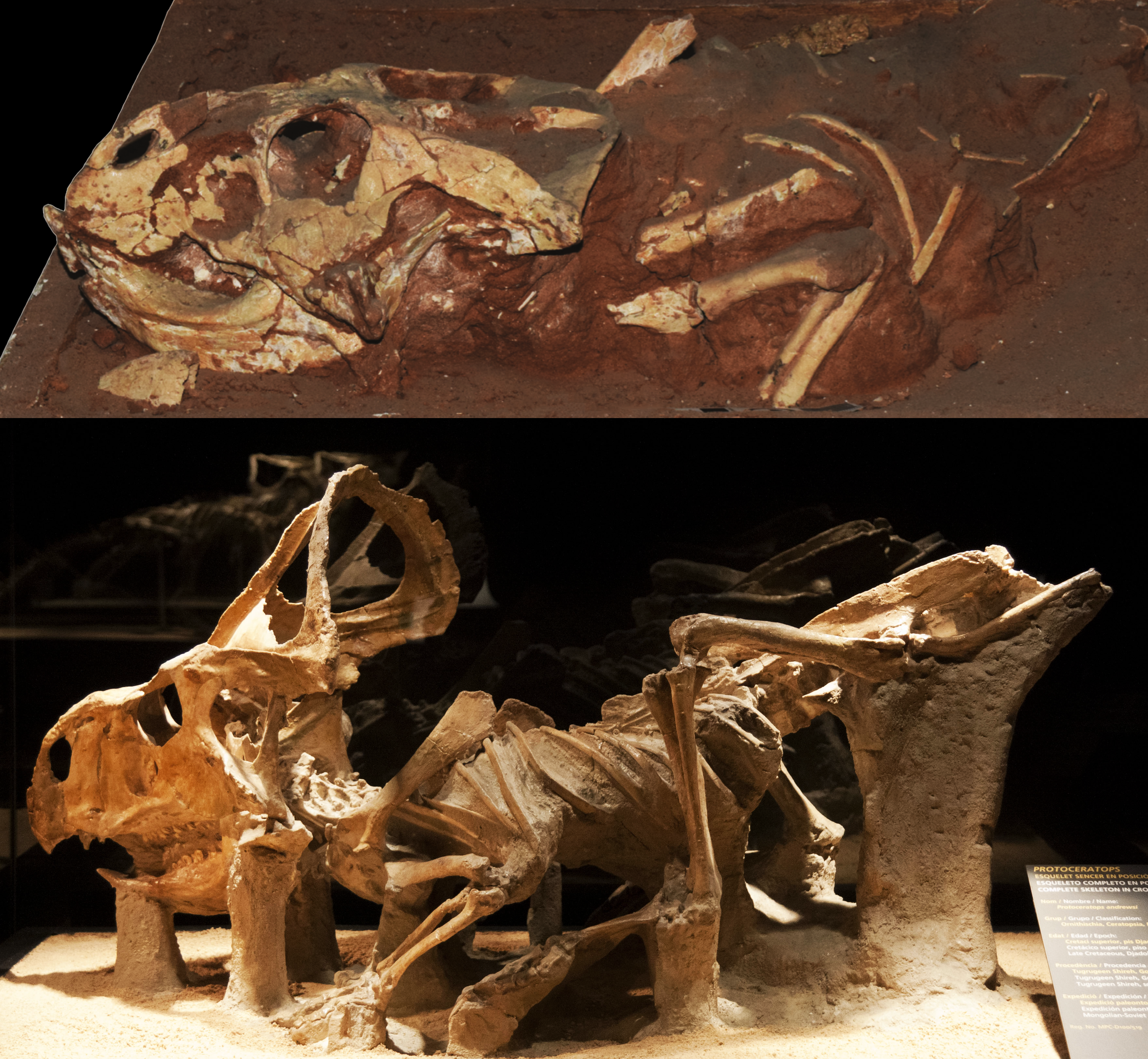
- Two protoceratopsids: Bagaceratops (top) and Protoceratops (bottom)

Scientific classification
- Kingdom: Animalia
- Phylum: Chordata
- Class: Reptilia
- Clade: Dinosauria
- Clade: †Ornithischia
- Clade: †Ceratopsia
- Clade: †Coronosauria
- Family: †Protoceratopsidae; Granger & Gregory, 1923

Type species
- †Protoceratops andrewsi Granger & Gregory, 1923

Subgroups
- †Ajkaceratops?; †Bagaceratops; †Bainoceratops?; †Breviceratops; †Protoceratops

Synonyms
- Bagaceratopidae Alifanov, 2003; Bagaceratopsidae Alifanov, 2003 (Ősi et al., 2010); Protoceratopidae Granger & Gregory, 1923 (Tereschenko & Alifanov, 2003); Protoceratopsinae Granger & Gregory, 1923; Protoceratopoidea Granger & Gregory, 1923 (Tereschenko, 2007)

= Protoceratopsidae =

Protoceratopsids Temporal range: Late Cretaceous, 75–71 Ma

Extinct family of ceratopsians

Protoceratopsidae is a family of basal (primitive) ceratopsians from the Late Cretaceous period. Although ceratopsians have been found all over the world, protoceratopsids are only definitively known from Cretaceous strata in Asia, with most specimens found in China and Mongolia. As ceratopsians, protoceratopsids were herbivorous, with constantly replacing tooth batteries made for slicing through plants and a hooked beak for grabbing them. Protoceratopsids were small ceratopsians around 1–2.5 m (3 ft 3 in – 8 ft 2 in) in length. Their bony frill and horns were much smaller than more derived members of Ceratopsia, such as ceratopsids.

== Description ==
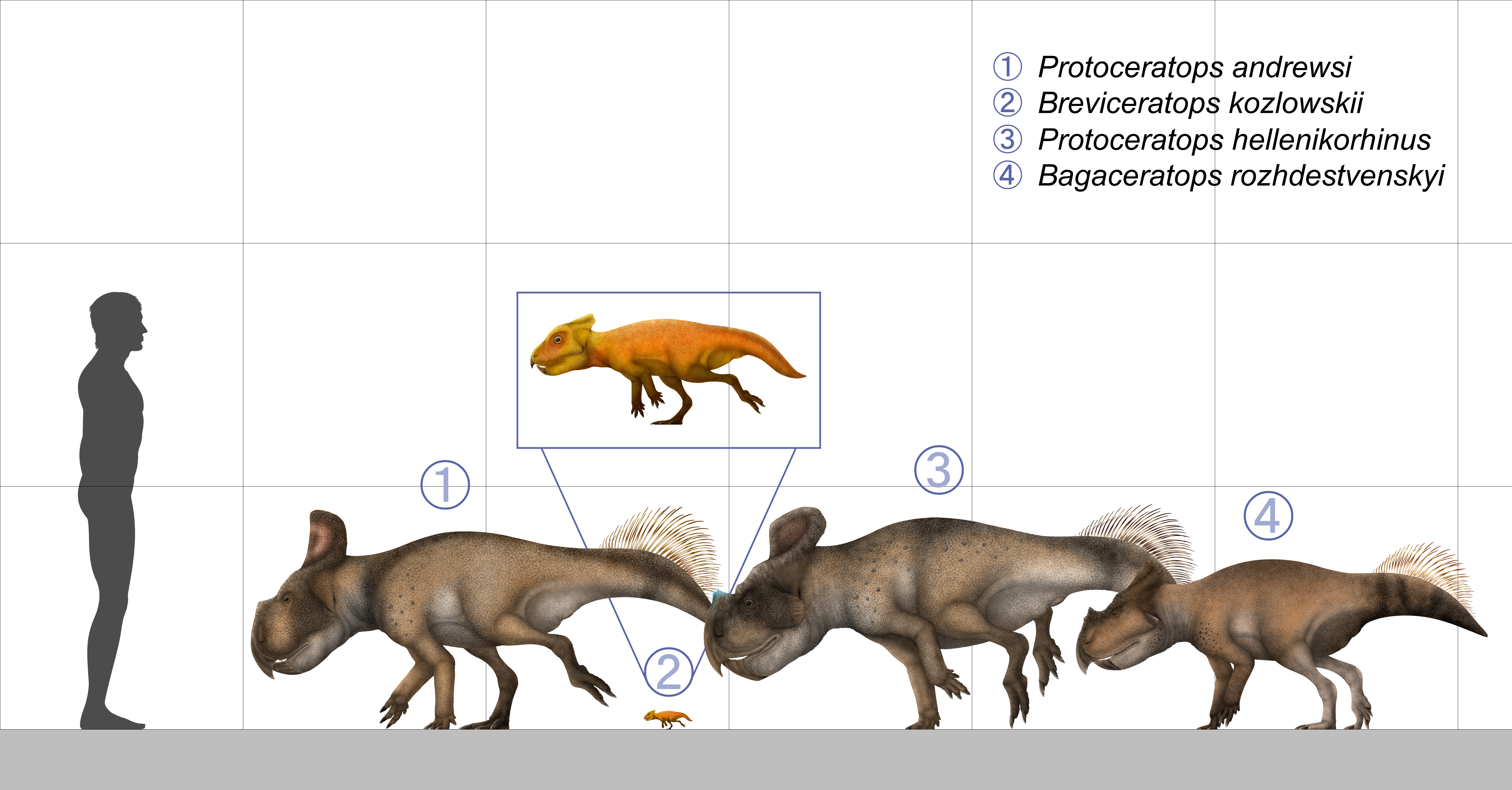
Size comparison of four protoceratopsids

Protoceratopsids were relatively small ceratopsians, averaging around 1-2.5 m in length from head to tail. Protoceratopsids have a frill and rostral bone characteristic of all ceratopsians. Their snout is particularly wedge-shaped with tall and narrow nostrils situated high on it. The antorbital fenestra is unusually small, and the antorbital fossa sits high on the skull with a slit connecting it to a sinus in the maxilla. This sinus is unique to Protoceratopsidae. Protoceratopsids may have had cheeks to hold food in their mouths. They have very well-defined maxillary and dentary ridges where the muscles in the cheek would have connected, and a number of foramina dotted the maxilla which allowed branches from the trigimenal nerve to reach the tissues attached to the maxilla, indicating that such tissues were likely muscular. The end of the upper jaw was likely not fleshy but instead covered by a horn-like material, and the upper and lower jaws curved in towards each other. Compared to more derived ceratopsians, protoceratopsids had a deep and wide oral cavity, though more narrow than in predecessors like Psittacosaurus, which may have aided in breathing or thermoregulation. In Protoceratopsidae, the nasal cavity, which was ancestrally one large cavity, was split into two by the hard palate. This splitting likely happened to accommodate the deeper oral cavity.

The vertebral column of protoceratopsids was S-shaped, and the vertebrae had unusually long neural spines, with spines on caudal vertebrae that were five times as tall as the centrum. The neural spines on the caudal vertebrae were longer in the middle of the tail than at the base, increasing the tail's height and flattening it. The middle of the tail was rigid and straight. The entire tail was quite horizontally flexible, but vertical movement was limited. The neck had limited mobility, especially in the lateral direction. The neck allowed individuals to bend their necks up and down so that they could reach food.

== Classification ==
The family Protoceratopsidae was introduced by Walter W. Granger and William King Gregory in May 1923 as a monotypic family for Protoceratops andrewsi. Granger and Gregory recognized Protoceratops's close relationship to other ceratopsians, but considered it primitive enough to warrant its own family, and perhaps suborder. Protoceratopsidae was later expanded to include all ceratopsians that were too advanced to be psittacosaurids, but too primitive to be ceratopsids. In 1998, Paul Sereno defined Protoceratopsidae as the stem-based clade including "all coronosaurs closer to Protoceratops than to Triceratops". Sereno's definition ensures that Protoceratopsidae is monophyletic, but probably excludes some dinosaurs that have been traditionally thought of as protoceratopsids (for example, Leptoceratops and Montanoceratops). The latter genera are now often classified in a mostly North American family Leptoceratopsidae.

Sereno in 2000 included three genera in Protoceratopsidae: Protoceratops, Bagaceratops, and Graciliceratops. Derived characters shared by these dinosaurs include a narrow strap-shaped paroccipital process, a very small occipital condyle, and an upturned dorsal margin of the predentary. In Protoceratops and Bagaceratops (and also in the non-protoceratopsid Leptoceratops), there is a blade-shaped parietal sagittal crest. The relationships of Graciliceratops to other protoceratopsids remain unclear due to its fragmentary nature, and it is regarded as a metaspecies with highly variable phylogenetic positions. In 2003, Vladimir Alifanov named, but did not define, a new ceratopsian family Bagaceratopidae to include Bagaceratops, Platyceratops, Lamaceratops and Breviceratops.

In 2019 Czepiński analyzed a vast majority of referred specimens to the ceratopsians Bagaceratops and Breviceratops, and concluded that most were in fact specimens of the former. Although the genera Gobiceratops, Lamaceratops, Magnirostris, and Platyceratops, were long considered valid and distinct taxa, and sometimes placed within Protoceratopsidae, Czepiński found the diagnostic features used to distinguish these taxa to be largely present in Bagaceratops and thus becoming synonyms of this genus. Under this reasoning, Protoceratopsidae consists of Bagaceratops, Breviceratops, and Protoceratops. Based on cranial characters such as presence or absence of premaxillary teeth and an antorbital fenestra, P. andrewsi is the basal-most protoceratopsid and Bagaceratops the derived-most one. Below are the proposed phylogenetic relationships within Protoceratopsidae by Czepiński:

- Protoceratopsidae
  - - Protoceratops andrewsi
    - - Protoceratops hellenikorhinus
      - - Breviceratops
        - - Bagaceratops

== Paleobiology ==
=== Daily activity ===
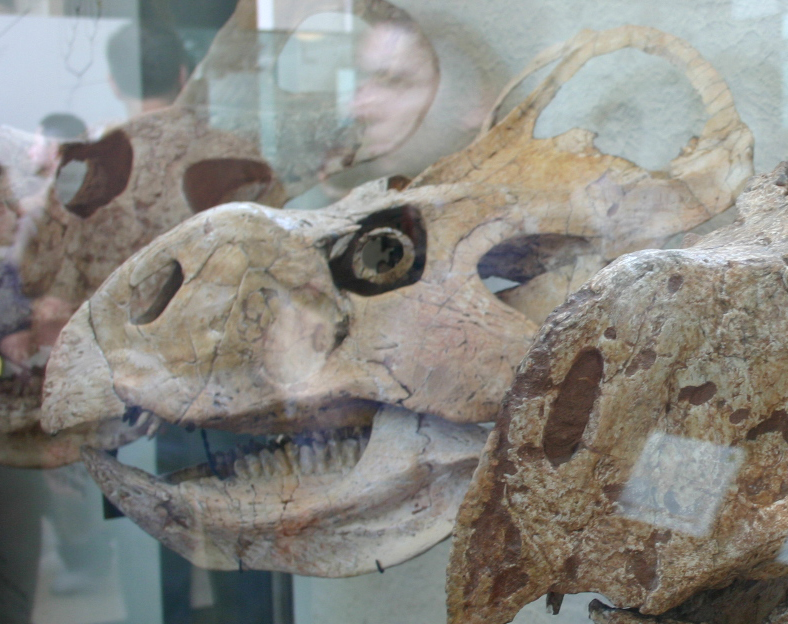
Protoceratops skull with large scleral rings

Based on the size of its scleral ring, Protoceratops had an unusually large eye among protoceratopsids. In birds, a medium-sized scleral ring indicates that the animal is a predator, a large scleral ring indicates that it is nocturnal, and the largest ring size indicates it is a nocturnal predator. Eye size is an important adaptation in predators and nocturnal animals because a larger eye has increased sensitivity and resolution. Because of the energy necessary to maintain a larger eye and the weakness of the skull that corresponds with a larger orbit, Nick Longrich argues that this structure may have been an adaptation for a nocturnal lifestyle. Protoceratops's mouth structures and general abundance indicate it was not a predator, so if it were also diurnal, then it would have been expected to have a much smaller scleral ring size. If Protoceratops was nocturnal, it could avoid the hottest parts of the day and survive in an arid environment without highly developed cooling mechanisms.

=== Sexual Dimorphism ===
There is no conclusive evidence supporting sexual dimorphism for Protoceratops andrewsi However, the frill may have been used in mating displays. The frill may have been brightly colored and used in head-bobbing displays similar to those of modern-day iguanas and chameleons to attract a mate. Leonardo Maiorino and his team used geometric morphometrics to analyze the dimorphism in Protoceratops andrewsi and concluded that there is no difference in male and female structures. Alternatively, Dodson's analysis of structure sizes in large Protoceratops found that they were dimorphic. The length and width of the frill, parietal fenestra, and external nares, the nasal height, the skull width, the orbit height, and the coronoid process height all varied with sex.

=== Growth ===
There are three phases in the life cycle of a protoceratopsid: juvenile, subadult, and adult. Juveniles are roughly one third the size of an adult and have an underdeveloped frill and nasal bump. They have not developed epijugals. Nests containing juveniles have been found indicating that they received some level of parental care. In the subadult stage, individuals are two thirds the size of an adult, and the frill and quadrates grow wider. The epijugal begins forming. As an adult, the frill becomes even larger, the epijugal is fully formed, and a small nasal horn develops.

=== Social behavior ===
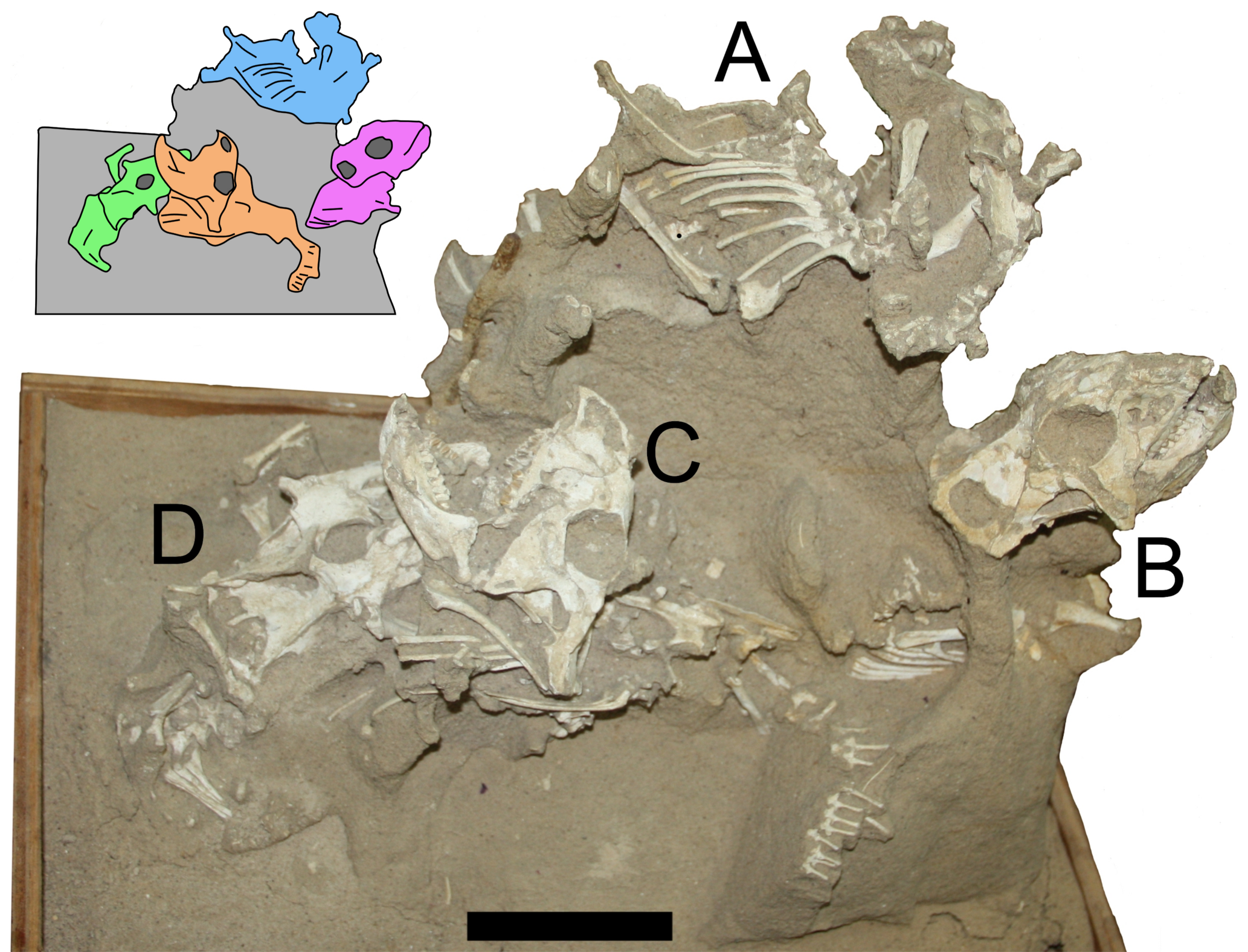
Protoceratops group of four juveniles buried alive

There is evidence that Protoceratops formed groups. Specimens of juveniles and young adults are often found in groups, although adults tend to be solitary. The nature of these groups is not completely known, though herds of young likely formed for protection from predators, and adults are believed to have come together for communal nesting.

=== Locomotion ===
Protoceratopsids were likely slow runners and tended to move at a walk or a trot. Their legs may have been straight, creating an upright posture, but there are some theories that they were splayed out to the side, contributing to their slowness. The skeleton of Protoceratops juveniles indicates that protoceratopsids were able to employ facultative bipedalism when young and became obligate quadrupeds in adulthood. However, adults still had proportions allowing the capacity to occasionally stand on two legs.

=== Tail function ===
Tereschenko proposed that protoceratopsids were actually aquatic, using their laterally-flattened tails as a paddle to aid in swimming. According to Tereschenko, Bagaceratops was fully aquatic while Protoceratops was only partially aquatic.

== Paleoenvironment ==
Protoceratopsids likely lived in highly arid regions. Specimens are often found in sandstones. Because the posture of some animals is preserved, it is likely that they were buried during a sandstorm or a dune collapse.

=== Paleobiogeography ===
Protoceratopsids have so far been found in rocks from the Late Cretaceous, dating to between about 75 and 71 million years ago. Ceratopsians originated in Asia and had two major dispersal events. The first was the migration of Leptoceratopsidae's ancestor through Europe and into North America. The second dispersal was 15 million years later, this time of Ceratopsidae's ancestors across the Bering Land Bridge into North America between 120Ma and 140Ma. Protoceratopsids are found in Asia but not North America.

== See also ==
- Timeline of ceratopsian research
