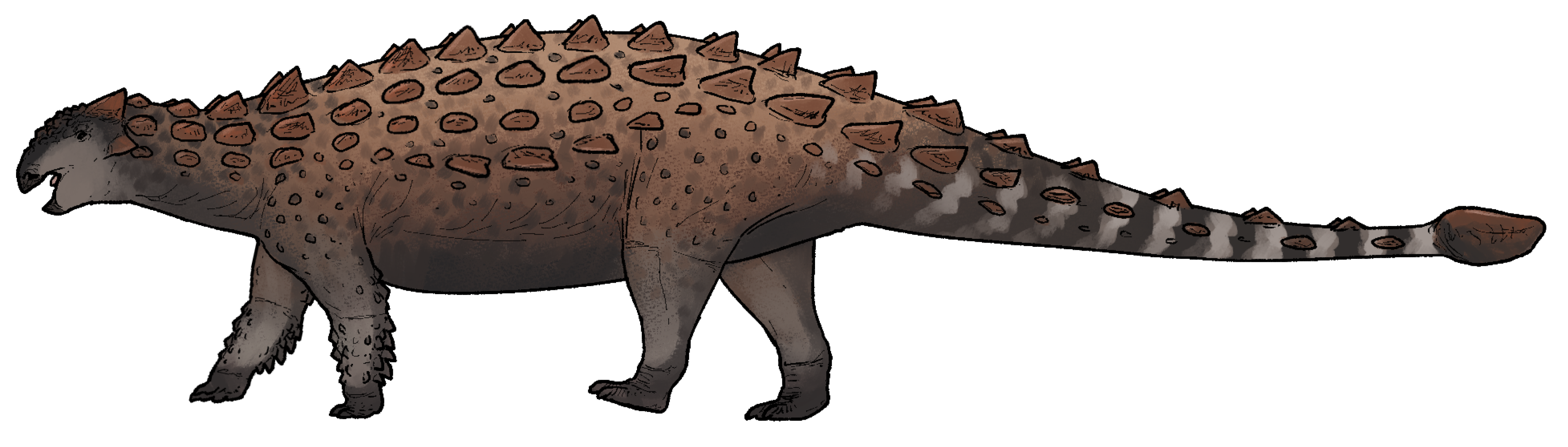
- Speculative life restoration

Scientific classification
- Kingdom: Animalia
- Phylum: Chordata
- Clade: Dinosauria
- Clade: †Ornithischia
- Clade: †Thyreophora
- Clade: †Ankylosauria
- Family: †Ankylosauridae
- Genus: †Huaxiazhoulong; Zhu et al., 2024
- Species: †H. shouwen

Binomial name
- †Huaxiazhoulong shouwen Zhu et al., 2024

= Huaxiazhoulong =

Huaxiazhoulong Temporal range: Late Cretaceous, Campanian

Genus of ankylosaurid dinosaurs

Huaxiazhoulong is an extinct genus of ankylosaurid dinosaurs from the Late Cretaceous (Campanian) Tangbian Formation of Jiangxi Province, China. The genus contains a single species, H. shouwen, known from a partial skeleton.

== Discovery and naming ==
Huaxiazhoulong type locality in Jiangxi Province, China

The Huaxiazhoulong holotype specimen, JPM-N000, was discovered in 1986 in sediments of the Tangbian Formation in Longxi village of Guangchang County in Fuzhou Municipality of Jiangxi Province, southern China. It was subsequently collected by the Guangchang County Museum, and it is now deposited at the Jiangxi Provincial Museum. The specimen is largely complete and well-preserved, comprising nine dorsal vertebrae, a sacral vertebra, most of the caudal vertebrae including the co-ossified tail "handle" and club, several ribs, the scapulocoracoids, the sternum, both forelimbs with three metacarpals, both hindlimbs with four metatarsals, most of the pelvic girdle, and three isolated osteoderms.

In 2024, Zhu et al. described Huaxiazhoulong shouwen as a new genus and species of ankylosaurid dinosaurs based on these fossil remains. The generic name, Huaxiazhoulong, combines the pinyin forms of the Chinese words Huaxia ("China"), zhou ("armour"), and long ("dragon"). The specific name, shouwen, is pinyin for "painted in the shape of a beast".

Huaxiazhoulong is the second ankylosaur to be named from Jiangxi Province, following Datai from the Zhoutian Formation earlier in 2024.

== Description ==
Size compared to a human

Huaxiazhoulong is a large ankylosaurid, with an estimated body length of 6 metres (20 ft). The holotype specimen likely represents a mature individual, as evidenced by the fusion of the neural arches to the vertebral centrum, the co-ossified scapula and coracoid, high olecranon process of the ulna, and proximal fusion of the anterior and greater trochanters on the femur.

== Classification ==
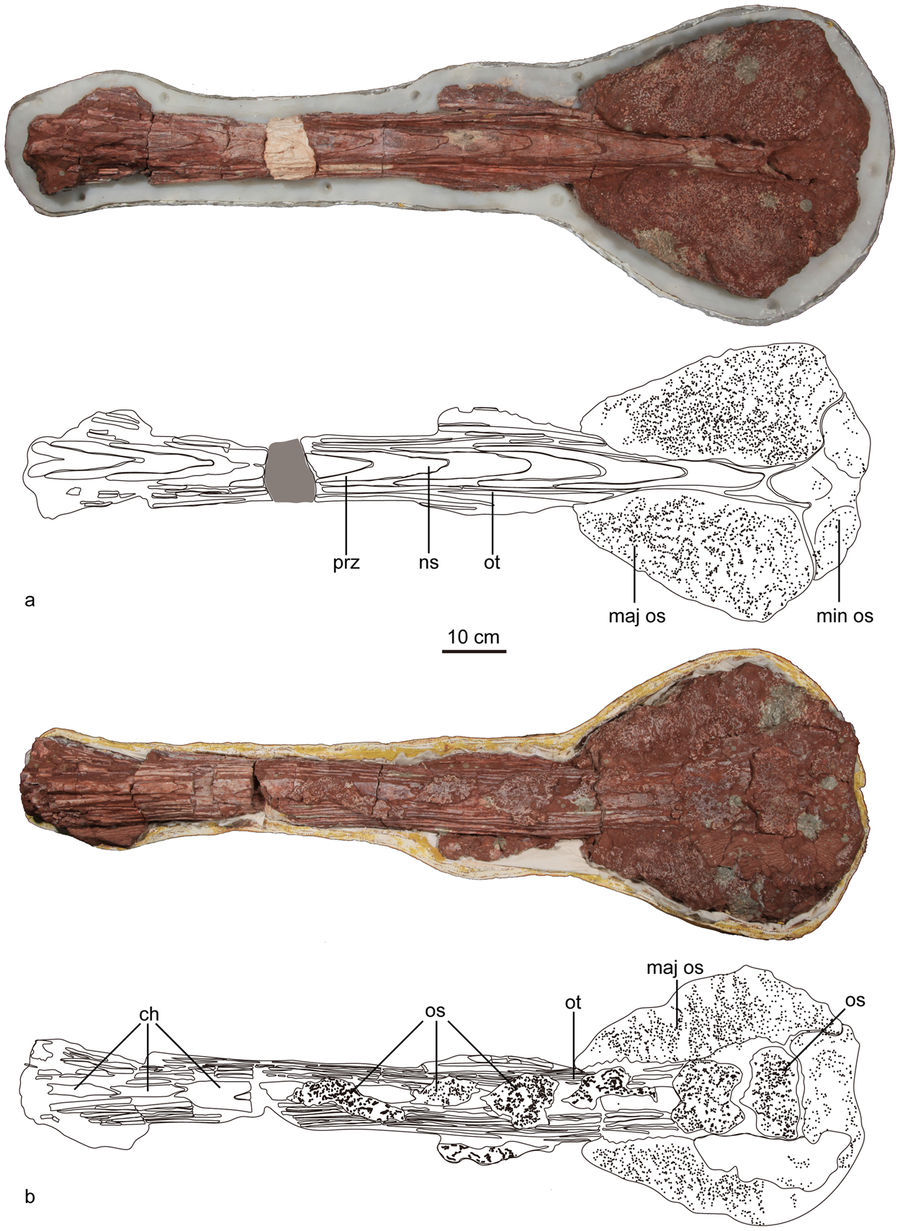
Tail club and handle of the related Jinyunpelta

To determine the phylogenetic relationships of Huaxiazhoulong, Zhu et al. (2024) scored it and the geographically similar Datai into the character matrices of Zheng et al. (2018) and Raven et al. (2023). Both analyses recovered Huaxiazhoulong as a basal member of the Ankylosauridae, closely related to Jinyunpelta. Their results are displayed in the cladograms below:

Topology A: Zheng et al. (2018) dataset

- - Basal ankylosaurians
  - - Nodosauridae
    - Ankylosauridae
      - - Shamosaurus
        - Gobisaurus
      - - - Jinyunpelta
          - Huaxiazhoulong
        - - Crichtonpelta
          - - Datai
            - - Pinacosaurus spp.
              - - Zuul
                - Ziapelta
                - Tsagantegia
                - Talarurus
                - Scolosaurus
                - Nodocephalosaurus
                - Euoplocephalus
                - Dyoplosaurus
                - Anodontosaurus
                - Ankylosaurus
                - - Saichania
                  - - Zaraapelta
                    - Tarchia

Topology B: Raven et al. (2023) dataset

- - Basal ankylosaurians
  - Nodosauridae
  - Ankylosauridae
    - Jinyunpelta
    - Huaxiazhoulong
    - - - Shamosaurus
        - Gobisaurus
      - - Crichtonpelta
        - - Euoplocephalus
          - Dyoplosaurus
          - - - Zuul
              - Ziapelta
            - - Anodontosaurus
              - Ankylosaurus
          - - - Datai
              - - - Scolosaurus
                  - - Tarchia
                    - Minotaurasaurus
                - - Saichania
                  - - Pinacosaurus spp.
                    - - - Zaraapelta
                        - Akainacephalus
                      - - Tsagantegia
                        - Talarurus
