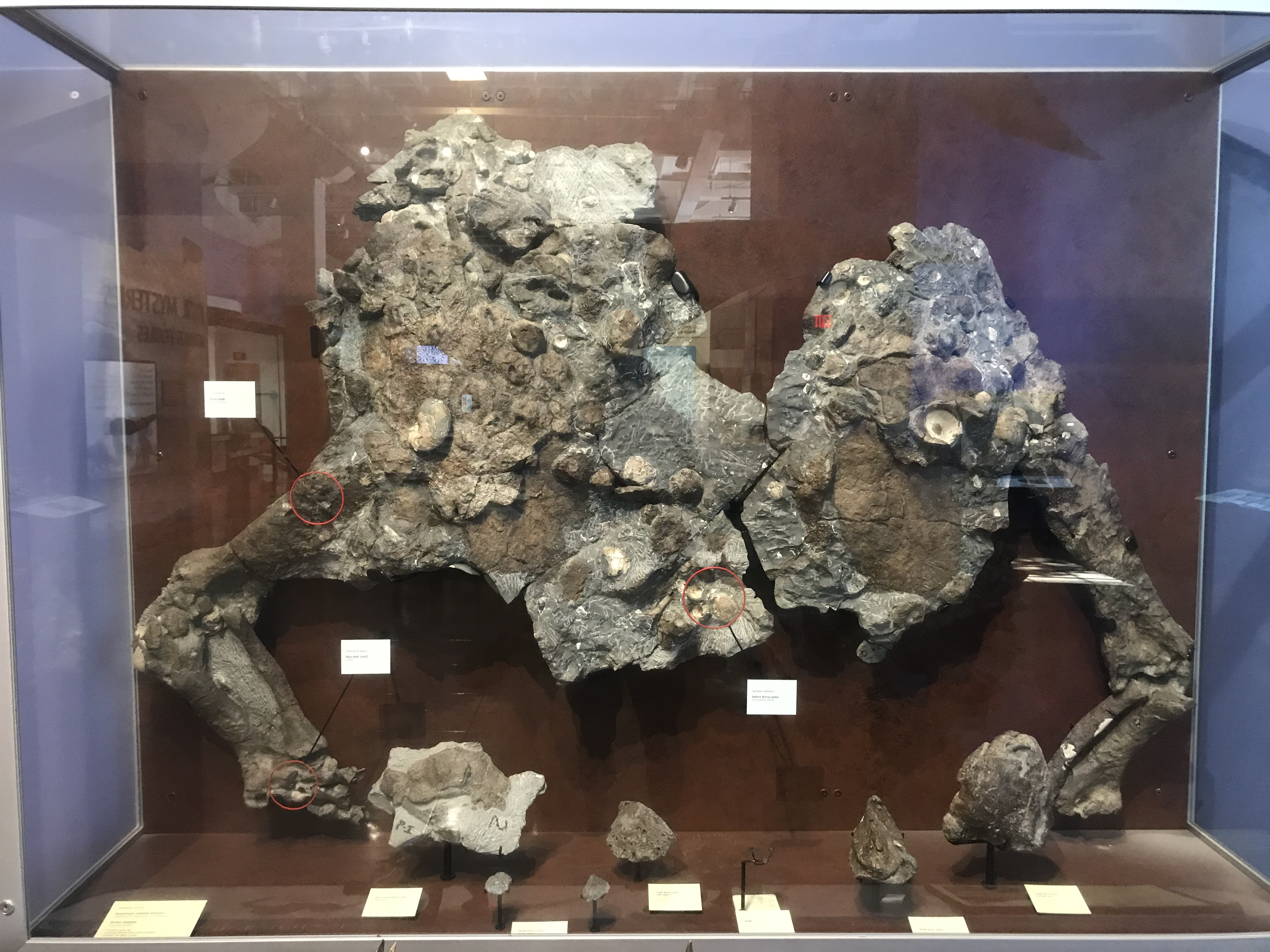
- Holotype specimen on display at the San Diego Natural History Museum, California

Scientific classification
- Kingdom: Animalia
- Phylum: Chordata
- Class: Reptilia
- Clade: Dinosauria
- Clade: †Ornithischia
- Clade: †Thyreophora
- Clade: †Ankylosauria
- Clade: †Euankylosauria
- Genus: †Aletopelta; Ford & Kirkland, 2001
- Species: †A. coombsi

Binomial name
- †Aletopelta coombsi Ford & Kirkland, 2001

= Aletopelta =

Aletopelta Temporal range: Late Cretaceous, 75.5 Ma

Extinct genus of dinosaurs

Aletopelta (/əˌliːtoʊˈpɛltə ˈkoʊmzi/; meaning 'wanderer shield') is a monospecific genus of basal ankylosaurid dinosaur from Southern California that lived during the Late Cretaceous (upper Campanian stage, 75.5 Ma) in what is now the Point Loma Formation. The type and only species, Aletopelta coombsi, is known from a partial skeleton preserving osteoderms. It was originally described in 1996 by W. P. Coombs, Jr. and T.A. Deméré before being named in 2001 by Tracy Ford and James Kirkland. Aletopelta has an estimated size of 5 metres (16 feet) and weight of 2 tonnes (4,409 lbs). The holotype formed a miniature reef and was scavenged upon by invertebrates and sharks.

== Discovery and naming ==
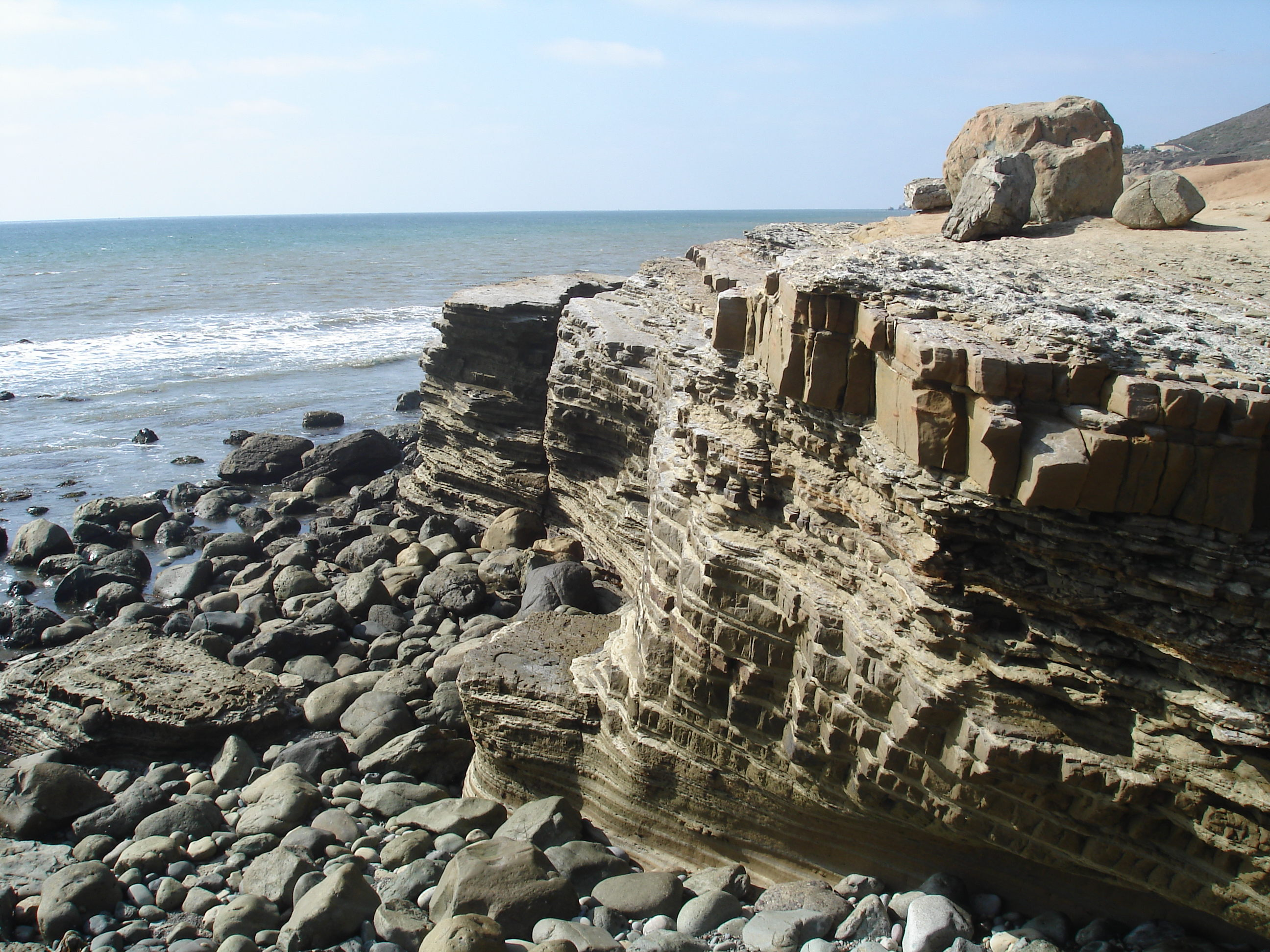
Point Loma Formation in Southern California

In 1987, construction work was done on the College Boulevard near Carlsbad at the Californian coast. While paleontologically surveying the work, Bradford Riney noted that a skeleton had been uncovered by a ditch dug for a sewage pipe. Within days, the specimen was secured by the San Diego Natural History Museum. It was dubbed the "Carlsbad Ankylosaur". The skeleton was later described, but not named, in 1996 by Thomas Deméré and Walter Preston Coombs before being named in 2001 by Tracy Lee Ford and James Kirkland. The skeleton originated from a layer of the marine Point Loma Formation which dates to the upper Campanian stage, 75.5 Ma. The formation has yielded specimens pertaining to calcareous nannoplankton, foraminifers, scaphopods, pelecypods, gastropods, cephalopods, ostracods, decapods, echinoids, elasmobranchs, and actinopterygians, with the addition of a femur, right dentary containing teeth and cervical vertebrae of a hadrosaur. The type and only known specimen of Aletopelta was once a bloated carcass that had been washed out to sea, likely by a stream, which sank to the bottom with its underside facing upwards and became a miniature reef, as evidence by Pelecypoda such as Ostrea sp. and Spondylus sp. being attached to the bones and the presence of ammonites and gastropods found in association with the skeleton. The carcass was also scavenged upon by marine invertebrates and sharks such as Squalicorax and Scapanorhynchus, which resulted with most of the long bones being hollow and many shallow pits on the osteoderms and ribs. The holotype specimen, SDNHM 33909, consists of teeth, fragmentary scapulae, partial humerus, partial ulna, possible fragment of right radius, ulna, partial left and possibly right ischium, femora, tibiae, fibulae, four or five partial vertebrae, dorsal neural arch, neural arches of the sacrum, fragmentary ribs, osteoderms including pelvic shield and cervical half ring. The type specimen may represent an immature individual based on the unfused astragalus, partly fused scutes and unfused neural spines.

The generic name, Aletopelta, is composed of the Greek words "aletes" (wanderer) and "pelte" (small shield), in reference to its armour and the fact that the tectonic plate containing the Peninsular Ranges Terrane was somewhere opposite the middle of Mexico in the Cretaceous, only moving northward due to plate tectonics, carrying the holotype specimen with it. The specific name, coombsi, honours the vertebrate palaeontologist Walter Preston Coombs, Jr., for their work and years of research.

== Description ==
Size comparison of Aletopelta

=== Size and distinguishing traits ===
Ford & Kirkland (2001) originally gave Aletopelta an estimated length of 6 metres (19.7 feet). However, Gregory S. Paul gave a lower estimate of 5 metres (16 feet) long and weight of 2 tonnes (4,409 lbs) in 2010.

Ford and Kirkland (2001) originally diagnosed Aletopelta based on the teeth being wider than tall; the femur being much longer than both the tibia and fibula; the presence of three metatarsals; a pelvic shield composed of polygonal, low-peaked osteoderms; a large short-pointed spike in the shoulder region; the presence of hollow cap-like osteoderms across dorsum; the presence of hollow pup-tent-like osteoderms over neck and shoulders; triangular, dorsally compressed caudal osteoderms that are highly asymmetrical from top to bottom; and hollow and thin osteoderms. However, Arbour & Currie (2015) later diagnosed Aletopelta based on the presence of hexagonal pelvic osteoderms that form a semi-continuous sheet over the pelvis; the pelvic osteoderms lack a dendritic surface texture; the first cervical half ring is composed of osteoderms fused to an underlying bony band rather than being closely appressed adjacent osteoderms.

== Classification ==
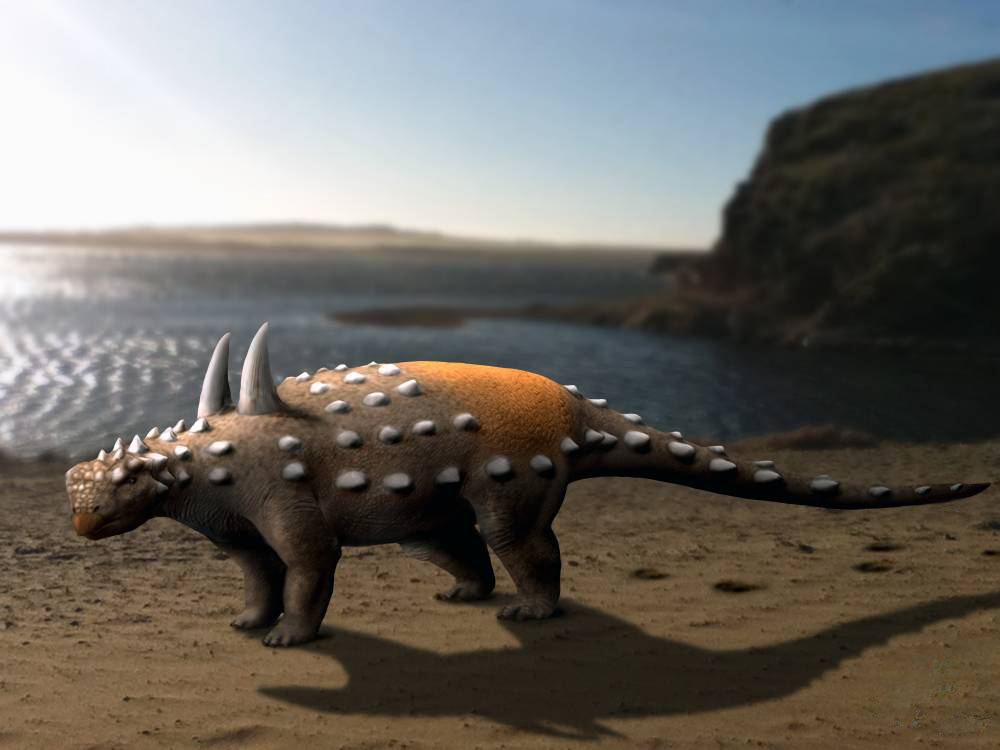
Life restoration

Deméré & Coombs (1996) originally interpreted SDNHM 33909 as an indeterminate nodosaurid that showed similarities with Edmontonia, Panoplosaurus and Stegopelta but refrained from naming it as they considered it to be undiagnostic. Ford (2000) considered that SDNHM 33909 formed the clade Stegopeltinae, along with Stegopelta and Glyptodontopelta, within Ankylosauridae based on the presence of a pelvic shield composed of co-ossified hexagonal osteoderms. Ford & Kirkland (2001) also reinterpreted it as an ankylosaurid and considered it to be taxonomically distinct enough to be warranted as a new genus and species. Vickaryous et al. (2004) considered Aletopelta as a nomen dubium due to the lack of diagnostic characteristics. Arbour & Currie (2015), however, considered it as a valid genus based on new characteristics and found Stegopeltinae to not be a valid clade. Arbour & Currie (2015) additionally recovered Aletopelta within a polytomy containing Liaoningosaurus, Cedarpelta, Chuanqilong and more derived ankylosaurids. A similar position was recovered by Arbour & Evans (2017) and Rivera-Sylva et al. (2018) but also placed Hylaeosaurus, Crichtonpelta, Gobisaurus and Shamosaurus within the polytomy. Park et al. (2019) also placed Aletopelta within a polytomy but with the inclusion of Jinyunpelta, Nodosaurus and Kunbarrasaurus. Although most often being recovered as a basal ankylosaurid, Frauenfelder et al. (2022) found it to be the basalmost nodosaurid.

The results of a phylogenetic analysis conducted by Arbour & Currie (2015) is reproduced below.

- Ankylosauridae
  - - Gastonia
    - Ahshislepelta
  - - Aletopelta
    - Liaoningosaurus
    - - Cedarpelta
      - Chuanqilong
    - - - Gobisaurus
        - Shamosaurus
      - - Crichtonpelta
        - - Tsagantegia
          - "Zhejiangosaurus"
          - - Pinacosaurus grangeri
            - Pinacosaurus mephistocephalus
          - - - Saichania
              - - Tarchia
                - Zaraapelta
            - - Dyoplosaurus
              - - - Talarurus
                  - Nodocephalosaurus
                - - - Ankylosaurus
                    - Anodontosaurus
                  - Euoplocephalus
                  - - Scolosaurus
                    - Ziapelta

== See also ==
- Timeline of ankylosaur research
