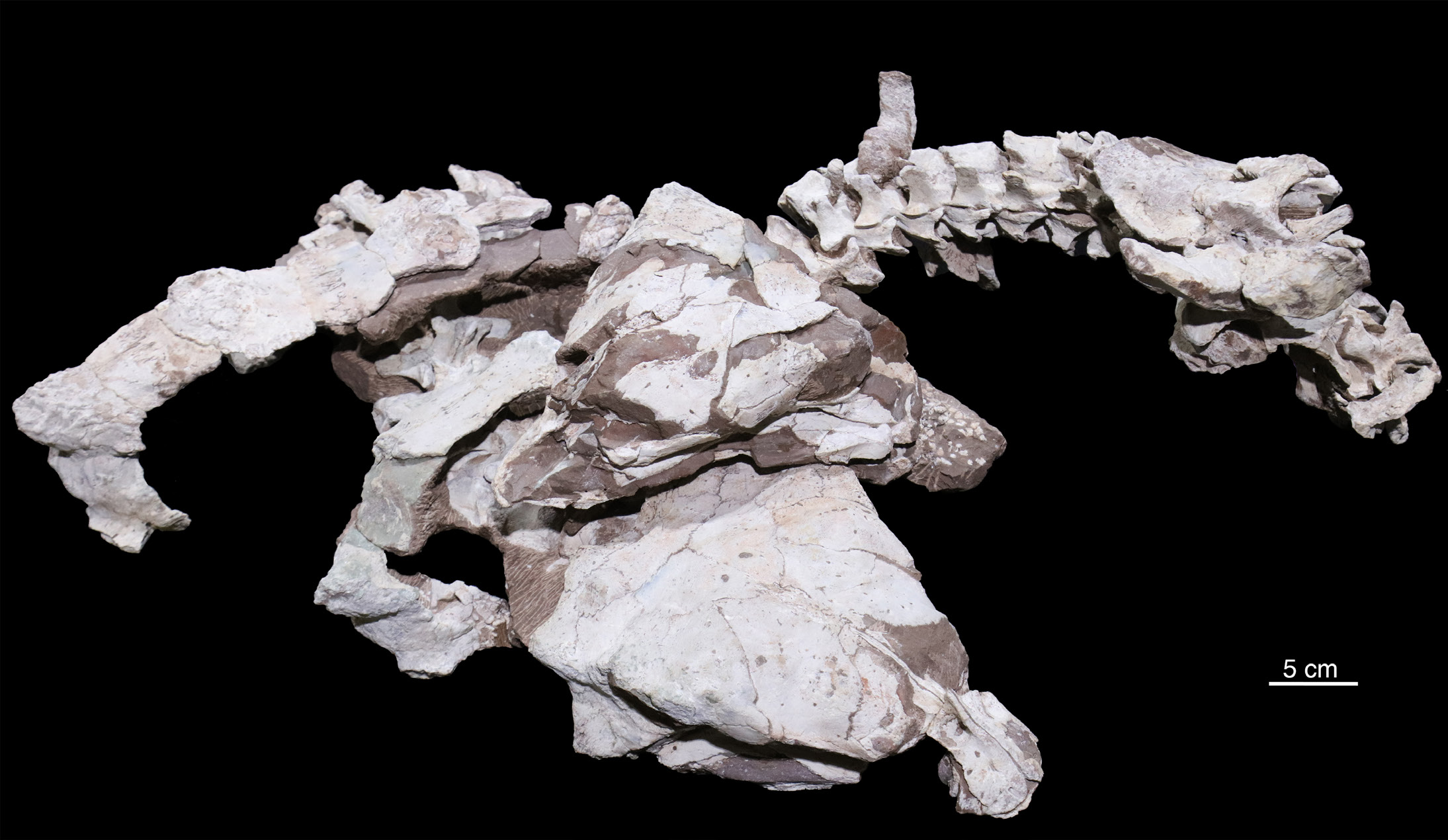
- Type specimen block

Scientific classification
- Kingdom: Animalia
- Phylum: Chordata
- Clade: Dinosauria
- Clade: †Ornithischia
- Clade: †Thyreophora
- Clade: †Ankylosauria
- Family: †Ankylosauridae
- Subfamily: †Ankylosaurinae
- Genus: †Datai
- Species: †D. yingliangis

Binomial name
- †Datai yingliangis Xing et al., 2024

= Datai =

Datai Temporal range: Late Cretaceous (Turonian to Coniacian), 96–90 Ma

Genus of ankylosaurid dinosaur

Datai is an extinct genus of ankylosaurid dinosaur from the Late Cretaceous Zhoutian Formation of Jiangxi Province, China. The genus contains a single species, D. yingliangis, which is known from the articulated skulls and partial skeletons of two individuals.

== Discovery and naming ==
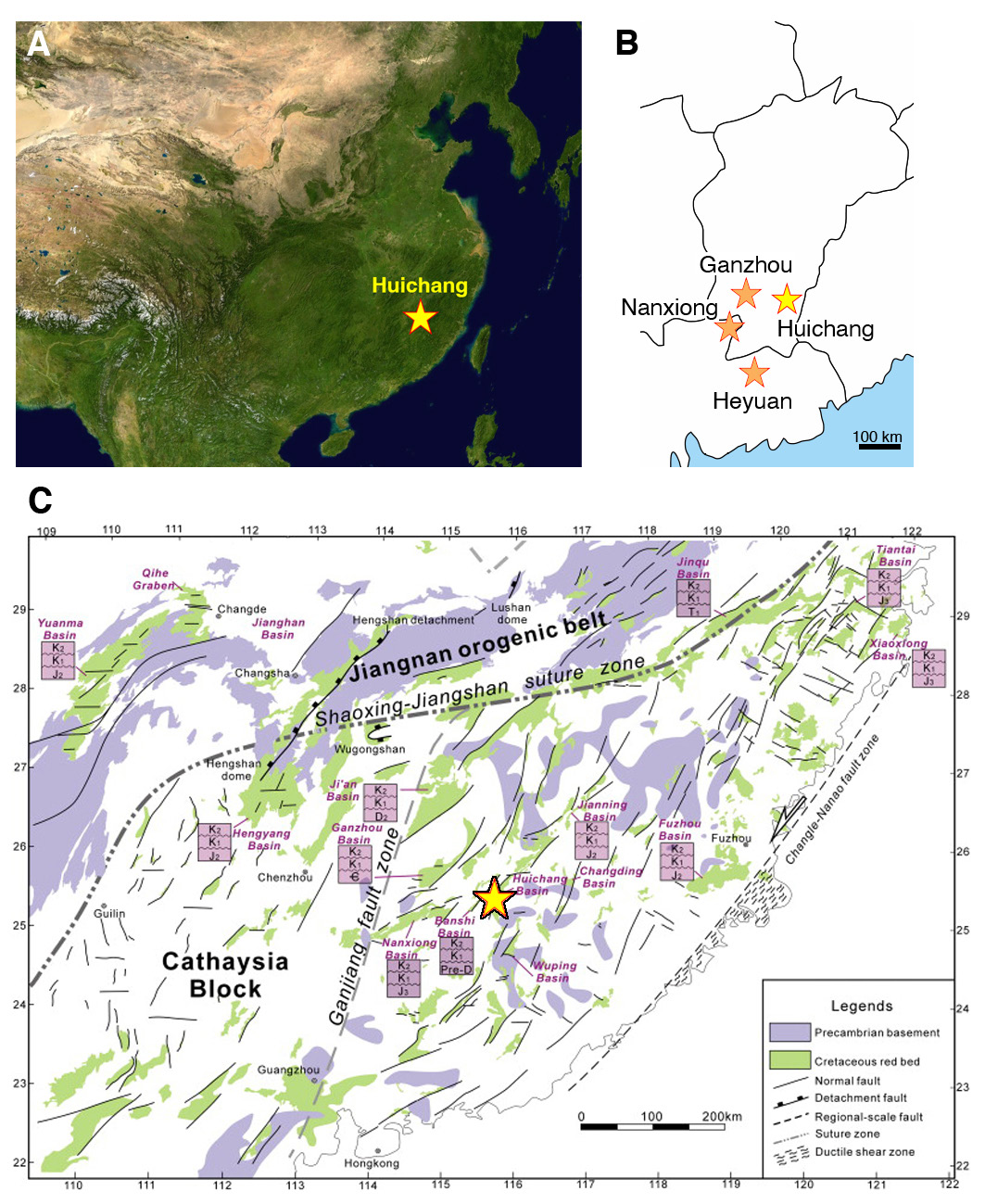
Type locality of Datai

The Datai fossil material was discovered in 2016, in sediments of the Zhoutian Formation in Mazhou, Huichang County, Jiangxi Province, China. The fossils were then obtained by the Yingliang Stone Natural History Museum two years later, where they are currently stored. The two known specimens—representing different ages of immaturity—were found articulated and in association.

The holotype specimen, YLSNHM 01002, consists of a skull, four dorsal vertebrae, ribs, four distal caudal vertebrae surrounded by ossified tendons (likely indicative of the presence of a tail club), incomplete pectoral girdles, the left arm (including the humeral head and distal radius and ulna), a fragmentary left ilium, a distal right femur, several osteoderms.

The paratype specimen, YLSNHM 01003, also includes a skull, in addition to all of the cervical vertebrae, five dorsal vertebrae, incomplete pectoral girdles, the left elbow region (distal humerus and proximal radius and ulna), and osteoderms.

In 2024, Xing et al. described Datai yingliangis as a new genus and species of ankylosaurine dinosaur based on these fossil remains. The generic name, 'Datai', is a composite of the last characters of the Chinese words 'tongda' (to understand/to be sensible) and 'antai' (stable). The specific name, 'yingliangis', is in recognition of the Yingliang Group.

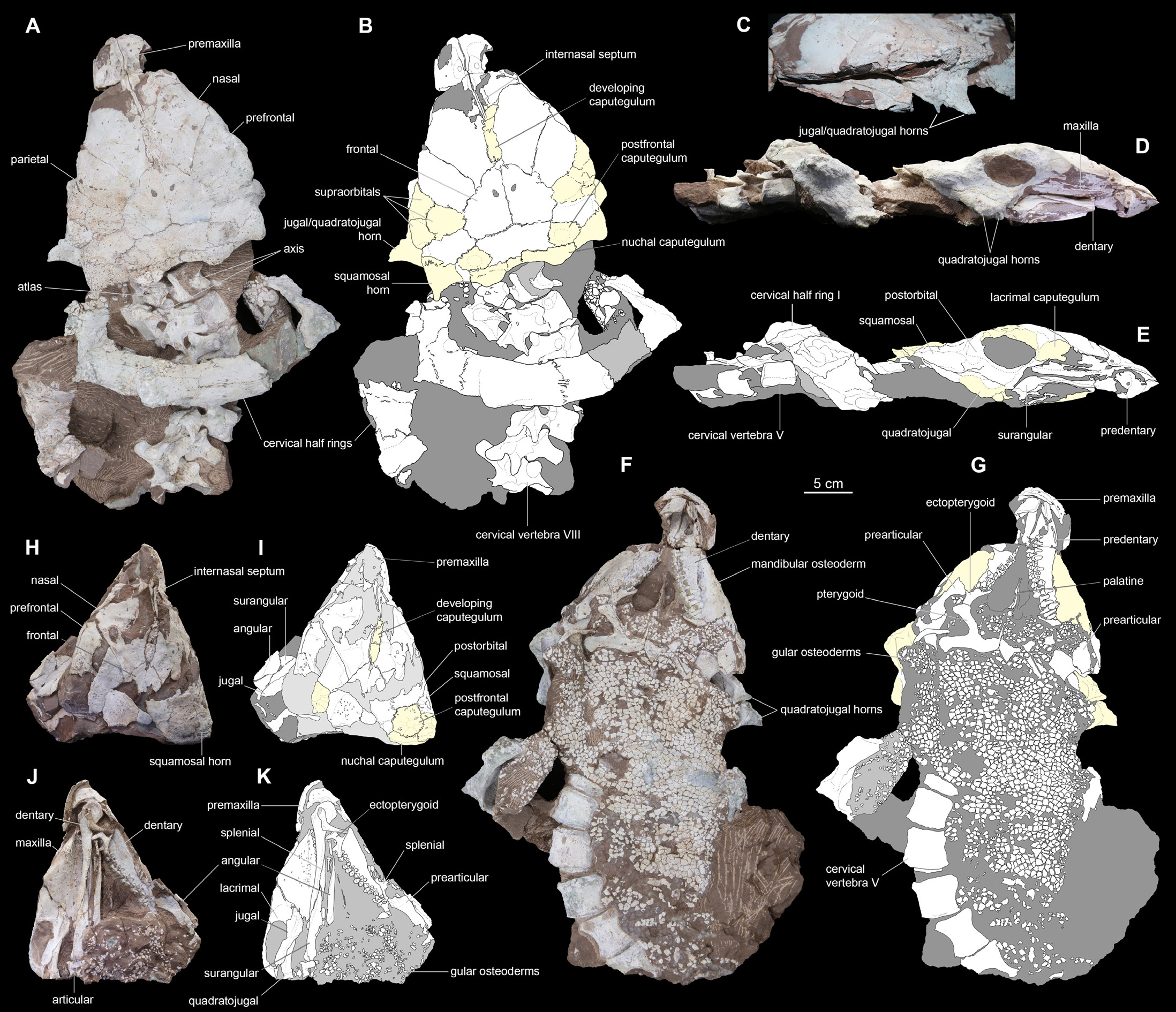
Datai skull material

== Classification ==
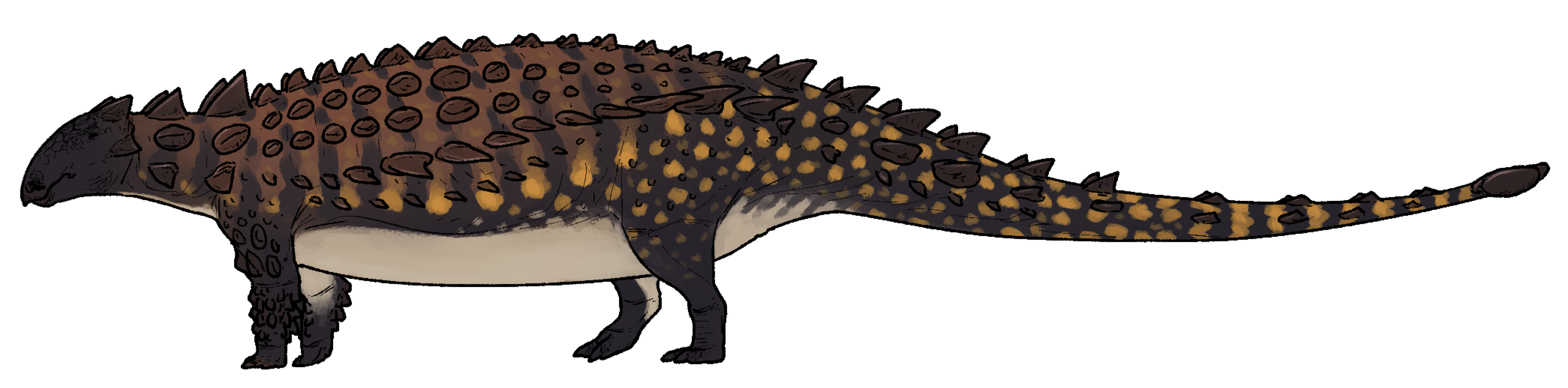
Life restoration

Xing Lida pointed out that in the past, ankylosaurian phylogenies had little stability with many clades tending to collapse into polytomies. In the study he used the traits of Datai to improve the resolution. For their phylogenetic analysis, Xing et al. (2024) tested two character matrices. The first was based on the findings of Zheng et al. (2018) with fourteen poorly preserved taxa being deleted or "pruned" by Xing, and the second was based on the findings of Raven et al. (2023) with 34-taxon deletion. The first tree recovers Datai as a basal ankylosaurine, while the second recovers it as a sister taxon to the two Pinacosaurus species.

Both trees are reproduced below excluding the outgroups for improved readability:

Topology A: Zheng et al. (2018) dataset + Datai, 14-taxon deletion

- Ankylosauridae
  - Cedarpelta
  - Chuanqilong
  - Liaoningosaurus
  - Shamosaurinae
  - Ankylosaurinae
    - - Crichtonpelta
      - Jinyunpelta
    - - Datai
      - - Pinacosaurus spp.
        - - - Tsagantegia
            - - Saichania
              - - Tarchia kielanae
                - Zaraapelta
          - - Dyoplosaurus
            - - - Talarurus
                - Nodocephalosaurus
              - - Ziapelta
                - - Zuul
                  - - Anodontosaurus lambei
                    - - Scolosaurus
                      - - Ankylosaurus
                        - Euoplocephalus

Topology B: Raven et al. (2023) dataset, 34-taxon deletion

- Ankylosauridae
  - Jinyunpelta
  - Gobisaurus
  - Chuanqilong
  - - Shamosaurus
    - Ankylosaurinae
      - - - Saichania
          - - Datai
            - Pinacosaurus spp.
          - - - Crichtonpelta
              - - Akainacephalus
                - Ziapelta
            - - Zaraapelta
              - - Talarurus
                - Tsagantegia
          - - Minotaurasaurus
            - Tarchia teresae
        - - Scolosaurus
          - - Dyoplosaurus
            - - Euoplocephalus
              - - Zuul
                - - Anodontosaurus lambei
                  - Ankylosaurus
