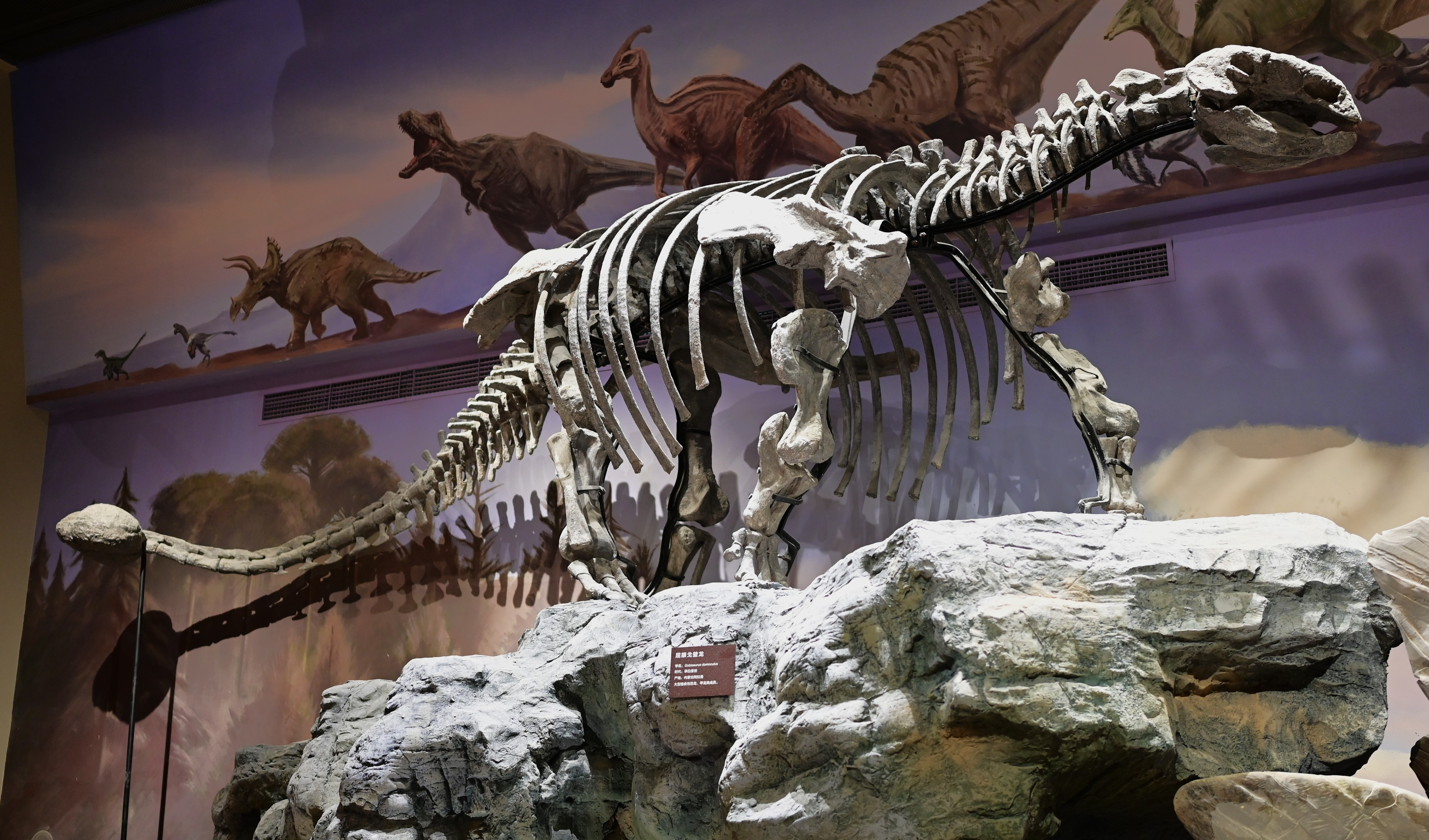
- Skeletal mount at the Baoding Natural History Museum

Scientific classification
- Kingdom: Animalia
- Phylum: Chordata
- Class: Reptilia
- Clade: Dinosauria
- Clade: †Ornithischia
- Clade: †Thyreophora
- Clade: †Ankylosauria
- Family: †Ankylosauridae
- Genus: †Gobisaurus; Vickaryous et al., 2001
- Species: †G. domoculus

Binomial name
- †Gobisaurus domoculus Vickaryous et al., 2001

Synonyms
- Zhongyuansaurus? Xu et al., 2007

= Gobisaurus =

Gobisaurus Temporal range: Early Cretaceous, ~Barremian–Albian

Extinct genus of dinosaurs

Gobisaurus is an extinct genus of herbivorous basal ankylosaurid dinosaur from the Early Cretaceous of China (Nei Mongol Zizhiqu). The genus is monotypic, containing only the species Gobisaurus domoculus.

== Discovery and naming ==
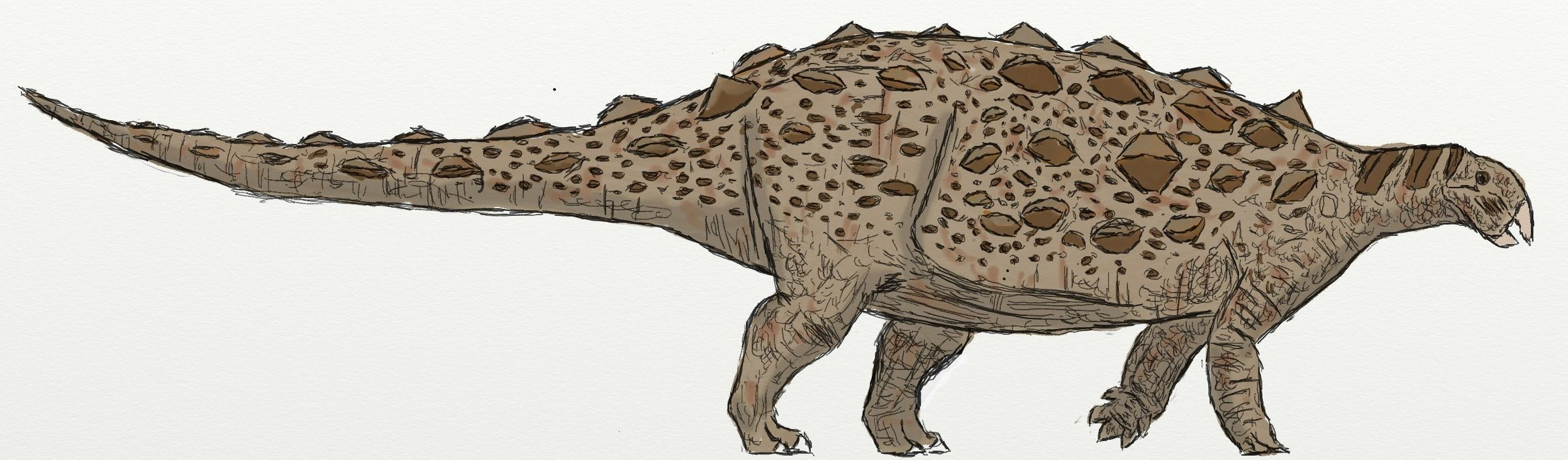
Life restoration

The Sino-Soviet Expeditions (1959–1960) discovered an ankylosaurian skeleton in the Gobi Desert of Inner Mongolia near Moartu, in the region of the Alashan Desert. The find was largely neglected until fossils were selected for a travelling exhibition touring the globe between 1990 and 1997, in the context of the China-Canada Dinosaur Project. The postcranial skeleton could not be located but the skull was displayed, informally labelled "Gobisaurus", at the time a nomen nudum.

In 2001, Matthew K. Vickaryous, Anthony P. Russell, Philip John Currie and Zhao Xijin named and described the type species Gobisaurus domoculus. The generic name means "Gobi (Desert) lizard," referring to its provenance. The specific name means "hidden from view" in Latin, referring to its being overlooked for three decades.

The holotype, IVPP V12563, was found in a layer of the Miaogou Formation (Maortu locality; originally interpreted as the nearby Ulansuhai Formation). Some studies indicate it may date to the Turonian, but others suggest an older date spanning between the Barremian and Albian. It consists of a skull and the as yet undescribed postcranial remains.

In 2014, Victoria Arbour concluded that Zhongyuansaurus, the type specimen of which, HGM 41HIII-0002, includes extensive postcranial remains, was a possible junior synonym of Gobisaurus.

== Description ==
Skull of Gobisaurus

Gobisaurus is a large ankylosaurian. The skull measured 46 centimetres (18 in) in length and 45 centimetres (18 in) across.

Gobisaurus domoculus shares many cranial similarities with Shamosaurus scutatus, including a rounded squamosal, short squamosal horns, low supraorbital bosses, large elliptical orbital fenestrae and external nares (oval eye sockets and nostrils), the cross-section of the eye sockets being about a fifth of skull length, a deltoid dorsal profile with a narrow rostrum (a narrow, kite-shaped, snout in top view), quadratojugal protuberances (cheek horns), and caudolaterally directed paroccipital processes (extensions of the rear skull pointing to behind and sideways). But the two taxa may be distinguished by differences in the length of the maxillary tooth row (26,6% instead of 40% of total skull length with Gobisaurus), an unfused basipterygoid-pterygoid process in Gobisaurus, the front of the pterygoid being in e vertical position, the presence on an elongate vomerine premaxillary process in Gobisaurus, and the presence of cranial sculpting in Shamosaurus, but not in Gobisaurus. This latter difference was denied by Arbour who concluded that the degree of sculpting was roughly the same.

The external nostrils had about 23% of skull length.

HGM 41HIII-0002, the holotype of Zhongyuansaurus, preserves a tail club "handle": the vertebrae toward the end of the tail interlock tightly, making the end stiff. However, this specimen does not appear to have a tail club "knob", the bulbous osteoderms seen in derived ankylosaurids.

== Phylogeny ==
Gobisaurus was placed in the Ankylosauridae in 2001. Vickaryous et al., 2004 found that a clade formed by Shamosaurus and Gobisaurus is "nested deep within the ankylosaurid lineage as the first successive outgroup to (the subfamily) Ankylosaurinae".

Other analyses find a more basal position as the sister species of Shamosaurus. Concluding that Zhongyuansaurus was a probable junior synonym of Gobisaurus, Arbour considered it unnecessary to use the term Shamosaurinae for the clade including just Shamosaurus and Gobisaurus.

Gobisaurus in a cladogram simplified from Zheng et al. (2018):

- Ankylosauridae
  - Kunbarrasaurus
  - - Hylaeosaurus
    - - Liaoningosaurus
      - Chuanqilong
      - Cedarpelta
      - - Shamosaurus
        - Gobisaurus
        - Ankylosaurinae
          - Jinyunpelta
          - - Crichtonpelta
            - - Pinacosaurus spp.
              - - - Saichania
                  - - Zaraapelta
                    - Tarchia
                - Ankylosaurini
                  - Tsagantegia
                  - - Talarurus
                    - Nodocephalosaurus
                  - - - Ziapelta
                      - Euoplocephalus
                    - - Ankylosaurus
                      - - Anodontosaurus
                        - - Scolosaurus
                          - - Zuul
                            - Dyoplosaurus

In phylogenetic analyses by Xing et al. (2024), Gobisaurus is recovered as a member of Shamosaurinae or as an ankylosaurid less derived than Shamosaurus. Below are two simplified cladograms from that study:

Topology A: Zheng et al. (2018) dataset + Datai (14-taxon deletion)

- Ankylosauridae
  - Cedarpelta
  - Chuanqilong
  - Liaoningosaurus
  - Shamosaurinae
    - Gobisaurus
    - Shamosaurus
  - Ankylosaurinae

Topology B: Raven et al. (2023) dataset + Datai (34-taxon deletion)

- Ankylosauridae
  - Jinyunpelta
  - Gobisaurus
  - Chuanqilong
  - - Shamosaurus
    - Ankylosaurinae

== See also ==
- Timeline of ankylosaur research
