= Shamosaurus =

Shamosaurus Temporal range: Early Cretaceous, Aptian–Albian

Scientific classification
- Kingdom: Animalia
- Phylum: Chordata
- Class: Reptilia
- Clade: Dinosauria
- Clade: †Ornithischia
- Clade: †Thyreophora
- Clade: †Ankylosauria
- Family: †Ankylosauridae
- Subfamily: †Shamosaurinae; Tumanova, 1983
- Genus: †Shamosaurus; Tumanova, 1983
- Species: †S. scutatus

Binomial name
- †Shamosaurus scutatus Tumanova, 1983

Extinct genus of reptiles

Shamosaurus is an extinct genus of herbivorous basal ankylosaurid ankylosaur from Early Cretaceous (Aptian to Albian stage) deposits of Höövör, Mongolia.

== Discovery and naming ==
In 1977, a Soviet-Mongolian expedition discovered the skeleton of an unknown ankylosaurian at the Hamrin-Us site in Dornogovi Province. This was the first discovery of an ankylosaur in the Lower Cretaceous of Mongolia.

In 1983, Tatyana Tumanova named and described the type species Shamosaurus scutatus. The generic name is derived from Mandarin sha mo, "sand desert", the Chinese name for the Gobi. The specific name means "protected by a shield" in Latin, a reference to the body armour.

Shamosaurus is known from the holotype PIN N 3779/2, collected from the Dzunbain Formation, equivalent to the Khukhtekskaya Formation and dating from the Aptian-Albian, about 115 million years old. It consists of a complete skull, lower jaws and partial postcranial skeleton with armor. Only the skull was described in 1983. Later the specimens PIN 3779/1, a skull piece, and PIN 3101, a lower jaw, were referred. The fossils are part of the collection of the Palaeontological Institute at Moscow. The holotype skull is exhibited there, together with two cervical halfrings.

== Description ==
Shamosaurus was a medium-sized ankylosaurian. In 2010, Gregory S. Paul estimated its body length at 5 metres (16 ft), its weight at 2 tonnes (2.2 short tons). In 2012 Holtz gave a higher estimation of 7 meters (23 ft).

In 2014, Victoria Arbour gave a revised list of distinguishing traits. The osteoderms on the skull roof are not very pronounced nor separated as distinctive caputegulae, head tiles. The squamosal horns on the rear skull corners are short and slightly rounded. The quadratojugal horn on the cheek has its apex in the middle. The rear rim of the skull roof has no clear (nuchal) processes.

Shamosaurus scutatus shares many cranial similarities with Gobisaurus domoculus, including a rounded squamosal, large elliptical orbital fenestrae (oval eye sockets) and oval external nares (nostrils), a deltoid dorsal profile with a narrow rostrum (the snout is tongue-shaped and narrow in top view), quadratojugal protuberances (cheek horns), and caudolaterally directed paroccipital processes (extensions of the rear skull obliquely pointing to behind and sideways). But the two taxa may be distinguished by differences in the length of the maxillary tooth row (40% instead of 26,7% of total skull length), an unfused basipterygoid-pterygoid process in Gobisaurus, the presence of an elongate vomerine premaxillary process in Gobisaurus, and the presence of cranial sculpting in Shamosaurus, but not in Gobisaurus. The last difference was denied by Arbour who concluded that the degree of sculpting was roughly the same.

Shamosaurus had a rather flat skull. The upper beak was sharp and obliquely appending to the front. The beak lacked any teeth. The jaw joint was located far behind the level of the eye socket. The occipital condyle, and with it the entire head, was obliquely directed to below. A secondary palate was present.

The armour of Shamosaurus contained two cervical halfrings with six segments each, protecting the neck. Also keeled osteoderms and flat oval scutes were present.

== Phylogeny ==
Tumanova placed Shamosaurus in the Ankylosauridae. She also named a Shamosaurinae, a group of basal ankylosaurids. In 2014, Arbour recovered an evolutionary tree in which Shamosaurus was the sister species of Gobisaurus.

Shamosaurus in a cladogram simplified from Zheng et al. (2018):

- Ankylosauridae
  - Kunbarrasaurus
  - - Hylaeosaurus
    - - Liaoningosaurus
      - Chuanqilong
      - Cedarpelta
      - - Shamosaurus
        - Gobisaurus
        - Ankylosaurinae
          - Jinyunpelta
          - - Crichtonpelta
            - - Pinacosaurus spp.
              - - - Saichania
                  - - Zaraapelta
                    - Tarchia
                - Ankylosaurini
                  - Tsagantegia
                  - - Talarurus
                    - Nodocephalosaurus
                  - - - Ziapelta
                      - Euoplocephalus
                    - - Ankylosaurus
                      - - Anodontosaurus
                        - - Scolosaurus
                          - - Zuul
                            - Dyoplosaurus

In phylogenetic analyses by Xing et al. (2024), Shamosaurus is recovered as a member of Shamosaurinae or as an ankylosaurid, more derived than Gobisaurus. Below are two simplified cladograms from that study:

Topology A: Zheng et al. (2018) dataset + Datai (14-taxon deletion)

- Ankylosauridae
  - Cedarpelta
  - Chuanqilong
  - Liaoningosaurus
  - Shamosaurinae
    - Gobisaurus
    - Shamosaurus
  - Ankylosaurinae

Topology B: Raven et al. (2023) dataset + Datai (34-taxon deletion)

- Ankylosauridae
  - Jinyunpelta
  - Gobisaurus
  - Chuanqilong
  - - Shamosaurus
    - Ankylosaurinae

== See also ==
- Timeline of ankylosaur research
