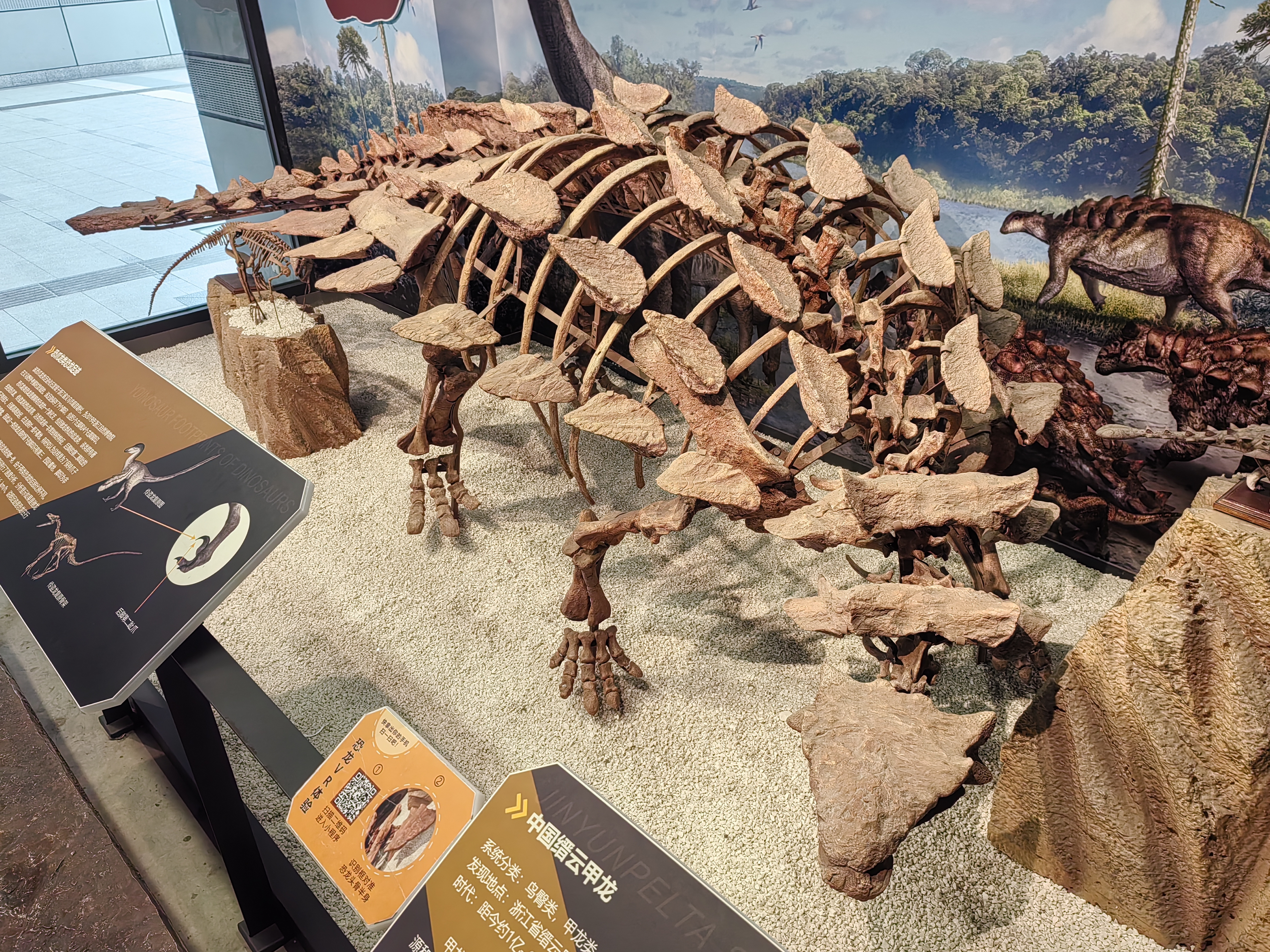
- Reconstructed skeleton at the Zhejiang Museum of Natural History

Scientific classification
- Kingdom: Animalia
- Phylum: Chordata
- Class: Reptilia
- Clade: Dinosauria
- Clade: †Ornithischia
- Clade: †Thyreophora
- Clade: †Ankylosauria
- Family: †Ankylosauridae
- Subfamily: †Ankylosaurinae
- Genus: †Jinyunpelta; Zheng et al., 2018

Type species
- †Jinyunpelta sinensis Zheng et al., 2018

= Jinyunpelta =

Jinyunpelta Temporal range: Cretaceous, Albian–Cenomanian

Extinct genus of dinosaurs

Jinyunpelta ("Jinyun shield") is a genus of herbivorous ankylosaurine thyreophoran dinosaur from the Cretaceous Liangtoutang Formation of Jinyun County, Zhejiang, China; it has one species, the type species J. sinensis. This species is the basalmost ankylosaur known to have had a proper tail club.

== Discovery and naming ==
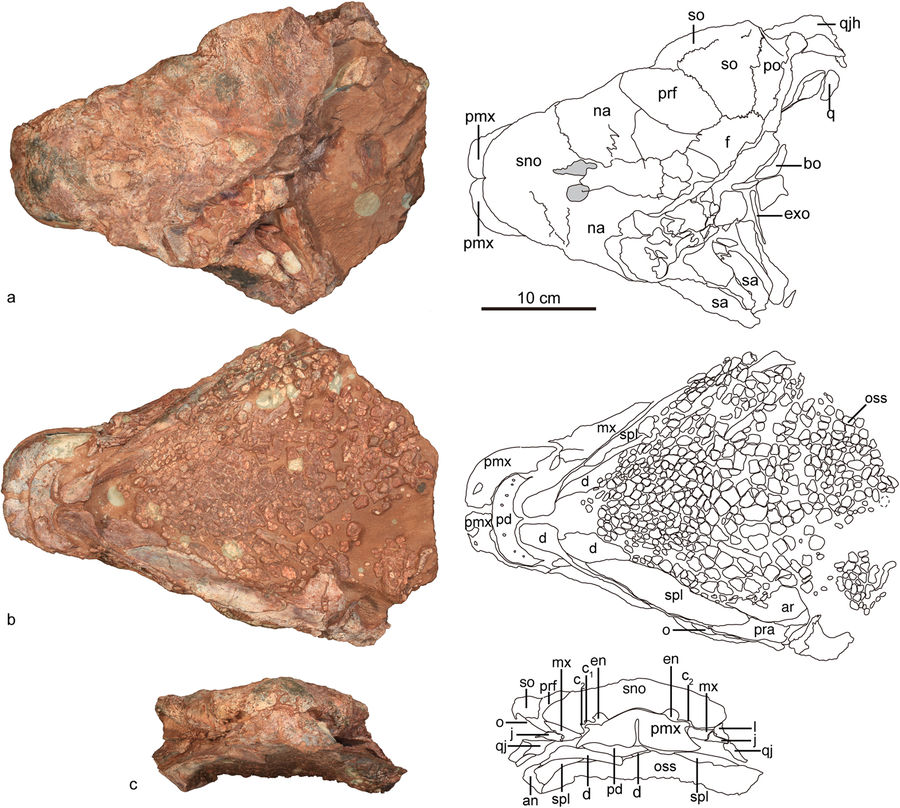
Holotype skull shown from above and below

In June 2008, farmer Li Meiyun on a construction site at Huzhen in Jinyun County discovered the remains of an ankylosaur. Between 2008 and 2014 excavations took place by a joint team of the Zhejiang Museum of Natural History, the Jinyun Museum and the Fukui Prefectural Dinosaur Museum. In 2013, five ankylosaurian skeletons were uncovered. A new species was to be based on two of these, while preparation of the other finds continued.

In 2018, the type species Jinyunpelta sinensis was named and described by Zheng Wenjie, Jin Xingsheng, Yoichi Azuma, Wang Qiongying, Kazunori Miyata and Xu Xing. The generic name combines Jinyun with a Greek peltè, "small shield", a usual suffix in the names of ankylosaurians. The specific name refers to the provenance from China.

The holotype, ZMNH M8960, was found in a layer of the Liangtoutang Formation dating from the Albian-Cenomanian, about one hundred million years old. It consists of a partial skeleton, with a complete skull, but lacking most of the hindlimbs, apart from the right humerus and the left thighbone. The paratype is ZMNH M8963, a skeleton lacking the skull but including the left lower leg and a complete tail club. It was found at two to three metres distance from the holotype.

== Description ==
The describing authors indicated a number of distinguishing traits. Some of these were autapomorphies, unique derived characters. Behind the nostril two additional openings are present, in ankylosaurids named the "C1" and the "C2", which in the case of Jinyunpelta are on a level with the centre of the nostril. On the front upper edge of the maxilla a triangular depression is present. The postorbital bone does not contribute to the rear edge of the eye socket. In the lower jaw, the front part of the prearticular bone is positioned beneath the rear part of the splenial bone. Obliquely above and to the inside of the inner condyle of the thighbone a distinct tendon scar is present.

Additionally, Jinyunpelta shows a unique combination of traits that in themselves are not unique. The combined upper side of the nasal bones is pierced by two paired oval openings. The antorbital fossa, with ankylosaurs the remnant of the antorbital fenestra, extends over the contact point of the maxilla, lacrimal bone and jugal bone. The prefrontal bone extends to below, touching the maxilla. At least some dorsal vertebrae have an elongated centrum, 30% longer than wide. The tail club is hexagonal in top view, with the widest point located near the rear edge.

Jinyunpelta is known to have exhibited biphasal jaw movement, an adaptation that had previously been thought only to have evolved in ankylosaurids during the Campanian.

== Phylogeny ==
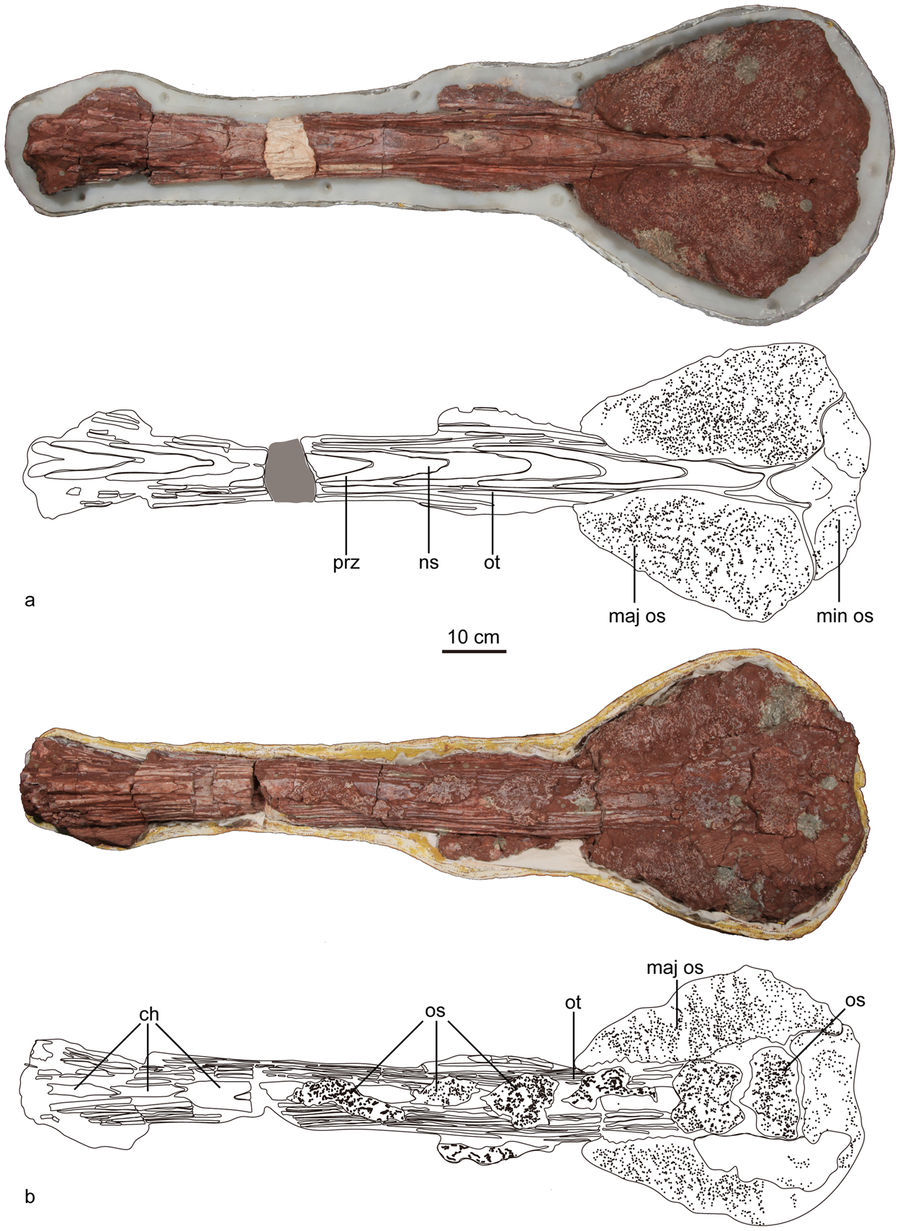
Holotype tail club

In 2018, Jinyunpelta was, within the Ankylosauridae, placed in the Ankylosaurinae. This would imply that it was the oldest known ankylosaurine. A cladistic analysis showed that it was also the basalmost known ankylosaurine, placed below Crichtonpelta in the evolutionary tree. It would then furthermore be the oldest and basalmost ankylosaurid that is with certainty known to possess a tail club; previously this had been Pinacosaurus dating from the Campanian. The size of the tail club shows that this trait must have been developed early-on in the evolution of ankylosaurids. Additionally, Jinyunpelta was the most southern known ankylosaurid from Asia.

In phylogenetic analyses by Xing et al. (2024), Jinyunpelta is recovered as a member of Ankylosaurinae or as a basal ankylosaurid. Below are two simplified cladograms from that study:

Topology A: Zheng et al. (2018) dataset + Datai (14-taxon deletion)

- Ankylosauridae
  - Cedarpelta
  - Chuanqilong
  - Liaoningosaurus
  - Shamosaurinae
    - Gobisaurus
    - Shamosaurus
  - Ankylosaurinae
    - - Crichtonpelta
      - Jinyunpelta
    - - Datai
      - - Pinacosaurus spp.
        - - - Tsagantegia
            - - Saichania
              - - Tarchia kielanae
                - Zaraapelta
          - - Dyoplosaurus
            - - - Talarurus
                - Nodocephalosaurus
              - - Ziapelta
                - - Zuul
                  - - Anodontosaurus lambei
                    - - Scolosaurus
                      - - Ankylosaurus
                        - Euoplocephalus

Topology B: Raven et al. (2023) dataset + Datai (34-taxon deletion)

- Ankylosauridae
  - Jinyunpelta
  - Gobisaurus
  - Chuanqilong
  - - Shamosaurus
    - Ankylosaurinae
      - - - Saichania
          - - Datai
            - Pinacosaurus spp.
          - - - Crichtonpelta
              - - Akainacephalus
                - Ziapelta
            - - Zaraapelta
              - - Talarurus
                - Tsagantegia
          - - Minotaurasaurus
            - Tarchia teresae
        - - Scolosaurus
          - - Dyoplosaurus
            - - Euoplocephalus
              - - Zuul
                - - Anodontosaurus lambei
                  - Ankylosaurus

== See also ==
- Timeline of ankylosaur research
- 2018 in paleontology
