= Zaraapelta =

Zaraapelta Temporal range: Late Cretaceous, Maastrichtian

Scientific classification
- Kingdom: Animalia
- Phylum: Chordata
- Class: Reptilia
- Clade: Dinosauria
- Clade: †Ornithischia
- Clade: †Thyreophora
- Clade: †Ankylosauria
- Family: †Ankylosauridae
- Subfamily: †Ankylosaurinae
- Genus: †Zaraapelta; Arbour et al., 2014
- Species: †Z. nomadis

Binomial name
- †Zaraapelta nomadis Arbour et al., 2014

Extinct genus of dinosaurs

Zaraapelta is an extinct genus of herbivorous ankylosaurid thyreophoran dinosaur from the Late Cretaceous of Mongolia. The type species is Zaraapelta nomadis, named and described by Arbour et al in 2014. Zaraapelta is known from a single skull from the Barun Goyot Formation. It was found to be closest to Tarchia in the phylogenetic analysis within its description.

== Discovery and naming ==
In 2000, Robert Gabbard, member of a team headed by Philip John Currie, found an ankylosaur skull in the Gobi Desert near Hermiin Tsav at the Baruungoyot. In 2014, Victoria Megan Arbour named and described the find as the species Zaraapelta nomadis, but at first it remained an invalid nomen ex dissertatione. Later that year, however, it was validly named as the type species Zaraapelta nomadis by Arbour, Currie and, posthumously, the female Mongolian paleontologist Demchig Badamgarav. The generic name is derived from Mongolian zaraa, "hedgehog", in reference to the prickly appearance of ankylosaurs, and the Greek πέλτη, peltè, "small shield", a common component of ankylosaurian names in view of their body armour. The specific name nomadis is the genitive of the Latin nomas, "nomad" and refers to the Nomadic Expeditions travel agency that has organised many palaeontological expeditions to Mongolia.

The holotype, MPC D-100/1388, was found in a layer of the Barun Goyot Formation, dating from the mid to late Campanian, about seventy-five million years old. It consists of a skull lacking the snout tip. No elements of the lower jaws were discovered. The specimen probably represents a subadult individual.

== Description ==
The preserved skull has, lacking the praemaxillae, about a length of forty centimetres, indicating that Zaraapelta was a medium-sized ankylosaurian. Zaraapelta differs from all other Ankylosauria in the possession of a squamosal horn with a very smooth bone texture along the upper cutting edge, abruptly changing into a rough surface at the inner and the outer side; and in the presence of an intricate pattern of a large number of osteoderms behind the eye socket.

Beside these autapomorphies, Zaraapelta differs from its close relative Saichania in having a large number of osteoderms in front of the eye socket; by a notch in the rim above the eye socket, causing the two supraorbital osteoderms there to have separate peaks; by the lack of distinct caputegulae, head armour tiles, behind the rear of the middle supraorbital; by less protruding osteoderms on the rear edge of the skull roof; and by the rear of the skull and the occipital condyle being visible in top view. Zaraapelta differs from the relative Tarchia in having a less sideways protruding caputegula on the prefrontal; in the presence of a(n ossified) scroll-shaped turbinate bone in the nasal cavity, at the underside of the frontal bone; by the lack of distinct caputegulae, head armour tiles, behind the rear of the middle supraorbital; and by the fusion of the quadrate with the paroccipital process. The main difference with Tarchia resided in the unique squamosal horn shape. However, Tarchia itself has also a unique squamosal horn configuration in that an accessory osteoderm is present in front of it. It might thus in principle be possible that Zaraapelta simply represents an old Tarchia individual in which this osteoderm has shifted on top of the squamosal horn, creating the strange double-layered structure. This possibility was rejected by the authors however, because from other ankylosaurian species no comparably large ontogenetic changes of the squamosal horn shape are known.

The squamosal horn, on the top rear corner of the skull, is robust and pyramid-shaped. There is a sharp cutting edge on top of the horn, bordered by smooth strips; these abruptly change into deeper rugose areas, so that rims are present on both sides. The quadratojugal cheeks horn is large with a concave rear edge. The cheek area between these large horns, behind the eye socket, is filled by flat osteoderms, separated by deep grooves, creating a delicate "dried mud" pattern. The eye socket itself is surrounded by a narrow bone ring. On its rear edge six osteoderms are present, those above rectangular in shape, the lower ones gradually becoming smaller and more triangular. Behind these are seven smaller tiles, roughly square-shaped, in an irregular pattern. The rear of this configuration is formed by a large triangular osteoderm. Just below the squamosal horn and above the cheek horn a row of small bumps is present.

== Phylogeny ==
Zaraapelta was placed in the Ankylosauridae. A cladistic analysis recovered it as the sister species of Tarchia. A phylogenetic analysis by Zheng et al. (2018) led to the same result. Phylogenetic analyses by Xing et al. (2024) recover it in slightly different positions within Ankylosaurinae. Below are two simplified cladograms from that study:

Topology A: Zheng et al. (2018) dataset + Datai (14-taxon deletion)

- Ankylosauridae
  - Cedarpelta
  - Chuanqilong
  - Liaoningosaurus
  - Shamosaurinae
    - Gobisaurus
    - Shamosaurus
  - Ankylosaurinae
    - - Crichtonpelta
      - Jinyunpelta
    - - Datai
      - - Pinacosaurus spp.
        - - - Tsagantegia
            - - Saichania
              - - Tarchia kielanae
                - Zaraapelta
          - - Dyoplosaurus
            - - - Talarurus
                - Nodocephalosaurus
              - - Ziapelta
                - - Zuul
                  - - Anodontosaurus lambei
                    - - Scolosaurus
                      - - Ankylosaurus
                        - Euoplocephalus

Topology B: Raven et al. (2023) dataset + Datai (34-taxon deletion)

- Ankylosauridae
  - Jinyunpelta
  - Gobisaurus
  - Chuanqilong
  - - Shamosaurus
    - Ankylosaurinae
      - - - Saichania
          - - Datai
            - Pinacosaurus spp.
          - - - Crichtonpelta
              - - Akainacephalus
                - Ziapelta
            - - Zaraapelta
              - - Talarurus
                - Tsagantegia
          - - Minotaurasaurus
            - Tarchia teresae
        - - Scolosaurus
          - - Dyoplosaurus
            - - Euoplocephalus
              - - Zuul
                - - Anodontosaurus lambei
                  - Ankylosaurus

== Paleobiology ==
Arbour pointed out that Saichania, Tarchia and Zaraapelta shared the same habitat. She assumed that this relative ankylosaurian abundance in species had been caused by their being the main herbivores in the area, enough crop thus being available to feed three populations, although their relative niches were unclear. The differences in head ornamentation would then have served species recognition. She saw no indications of sexual dimorphism. However, she also assumed that sexual selection had been a factor in the evolution of the typical Zaraapelta head ornamentation.

== See also ==
- Timeline of ankylosaur research
