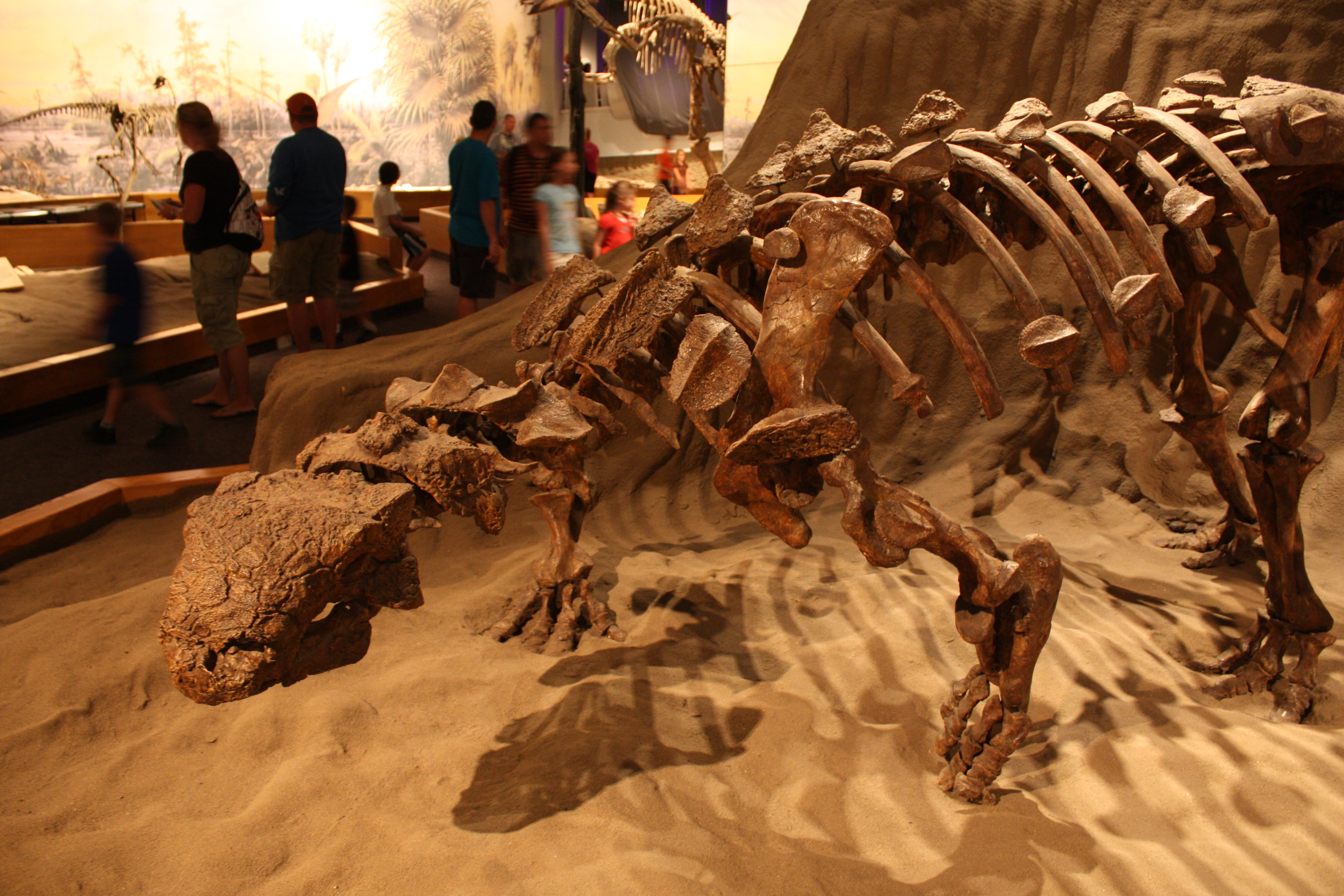
- Skeleton of Scolosaurus thronus, once referred to Euoplocephalus. Royal Tyrrell Museum of Palaeontology

Scientific classification
- Kingdom: Animalia
- Phylum: Chordata
- Class: Reptilia
- Clade: Dinosauria
- Clade: †Ornithischia
- Clade: †Thyreophora
- Clade: †Ankylosauria
- Family: †Ankylosauridae
- Subfamily: †Ankylosaurinae; Brown, 1908

Subgroups
- †Ahshislepelta?; †Bissektipelta; †Crichtonpelta; †Crichtonsaurus; †Datai; †Eopinacosaurus; †Jinyunpelta; †Minotaurasaurus; †Pinacosaurus; †Saichania; †Shanxia?; †Tarchia; †Tsagantegia; †Zaraapelta; †Zhongyuansaurus?; †Ankylosaurini Arbour & Currie, 2016; †Akainacephalus; †Ankylosaurus; †Anodontosaurus; †Dyoplosaurus; †Euoplocephalus; †Nodocephalosaurus; †Oohkotokia?; †Platypelta; †Scolosaurus; †Talarurus; †Tianzhenosaurus?; †Ziapelta; †Zuul

= Ankylosaurinae =

Ankylosaurines Temporal range: Cretaceous, 105–66 Ma

Extinct subfamily of dinosaurs

Ankylosaurinae is a subfamily of ankylosaurid dinosaurs, existing from the Early Cretaceous about 105 million years ago until the end of the Late Cretaceous, about 66 mya. Many genera are included in the clade, such as Ankylosaurus, Pinacosaurus, Euoplocephalus, and Saichania.

== Features ==
Ankylosaurinae is formally defined in the PhyloCode as "the largest clade containing Ankylosaurus magniventris, but not Shamosaurus scutatus". The tribe Ankylosaurini is defined in the PhyloCode as "the largest clade containing Ankylosaurus magniventris, but not Pinacosaurus grangeri and Saichania chulsanensis".

Diagnostic features of ankylosaurines include the nuchal shelf that obscures the occiput in dorsal view, and the quadrate condyle which is obscured lightly by the quadratojugal boss.

== Phylogeny ==
The following cladogram is based on the 50% majority rule phylogenetic analysis of Arbour & Currie (2015):

- Ankylosaurinae
  - Crichtonpelta
  - - Tsagantegia
    - Pinacosaurus
    - - - Saichania
        - - Tarchia
          - Zaraapelta
      - Ankylosaurini
        - Dyoplosaurus
        - - - Talarurus
            - Nodocephalosaurus
          - - - Ankylosaurus
              - Anodontosaurus
            - Euoplocephalus
            - - Scolosaurus
              - Ziapelta
