= Victoria Arbour =

Canadian evolutionary biologist (born 1983)

Victoria M. Arbour
- Born: 1983 (age 42–43)
- Education: Dalhousie University (BSc); University of Alberta (PhD)
- Known for: Ankylosaurs
- Scientific career
- Fields: Paleontology
- Workplaces: University of Toronto, Royal Ontario Museum
- Thesis: Systematics, evolution, and biogeography of the ankylosaurid dinosaurs (2014)
- Doctoral advisor: Philip J. Currie
- Website: pseudoplocephalus.com

Victoria Megan Arbour is a Canadian evolutionary biologist and vertebrate palaeontologist at Royal BC Museum, where she is Curator of Palaeontology. An "expert on the armoured dinosaurs known as ankylosaurs", Arbour analyzes fossils and creates 3-D computer models. She named the possible pterosaur Gwawinapterus from Hornby Island, and a partial ornithischian dinosaur from Sustut Basin, British Columbia (now named Ferrisaurus), and has participated in the naming of the ankylosaurs Zuul, Zaraapelta, Crichtonpelta, and Ziapelta.

== Early life and education ==
Born in 1983, Arbour is from Halifax, Nova Scotia. Her mother, a math teacher, and father, a soil scientist, supported her science interests. Arbour completed a B.Sc. honours thesis supervised by Milton Graves, An ornithischian dinosaur from the Sustut Basin, British Columbia, Canada, and graduated from Dalhousie University in 2006. She completed her master's thesis, Evolution, biomechanics, and function of the tail club of ankylosaurid dinosaurs (Ornithischia: Thyreophora) in 2009, and her Ph.D. thesis, Systematics, evolution, and biogeography of the ankylosaurid dinosaurs, in 2014, both advised by paleontologist Philip Currie at the University of Alberta.

== Career ==
Arbour became Curator of Palaeontology at Royal BC Museum in 2018.

She previously worked as a Natural Sciences and Engineering Research Council of Canada postdoctoral fellow at the University of Toronto and Royal Ontario Museum. As the top-ranked female candidate for the fellowship, she also received a supplement available to applicants who demonstrate "exemplary involvement in science promotion, mentorship, and leadership".

From 2014 to 2016 she was a postdoctoral researcher with a joint appointment at North Carolina Museum of Natural Sciences and North Carolina State University.

Arbour primarily studies dinosaurs in the group Ankylosauria, including biomechanical analyses of tail clubs. Arbour has studied microfossils from Nova Scotia. She has also named the possible pterosaur Gwawinapterus from Hornby Island, and a partial ornithischian dinosaur from Sustut Basin, both locations in British Columbia. She has participated in the naming of the ankylosaurs Zuul, Zaraapelta, Crichtonpelta, Ziapelta, Patagopelta, as well as resurrecting Dyoplosaurus, and publishing a new phylogenetic analysis on the interrelationships of Ankylosauridae.

According to Brian Alary of the University of Alberta, "She's contributed to history-making research by analyzing fossils and creating 3-D computer models, developed course materials and taught 35,000 students at a time through the Dino 101 MOOC." Philip Currie credits Arbour for involving the paleontology discipline with the University of Alberta's "Women in Scholarship, Engineering, Science & Technology", making study of dinosaurs more appealing to women.

Below is a list of taxa that Arbour has contributed to naming:

Year	Taxon	Authors
2022	Patagopelta cristata gen. et sp. nov.	Riguetti, Pereda-Suberbiola, Ponce, Salgado, Apesteguía, Rozadilla, & Arbour
2019	Ferrisaurus sustutensis gen. et sp. nov.	Arbour & Evans
2017	Zuul crurivastator gen. et sp. nov.	Arbour & Evans
2014	Zaraapelta nomadis gen. et sp. nov.	Arbour, Currie, & Badamgarav
2014	Ziapelta sanjuanensis gen. et sp. nov.	Arbour, Burns, Sullivan, Lucas, Cantrell, Fry, & Suazo
2011	Gwawinapterus beardi gen. et sp. nov.	Arbour & Currie
