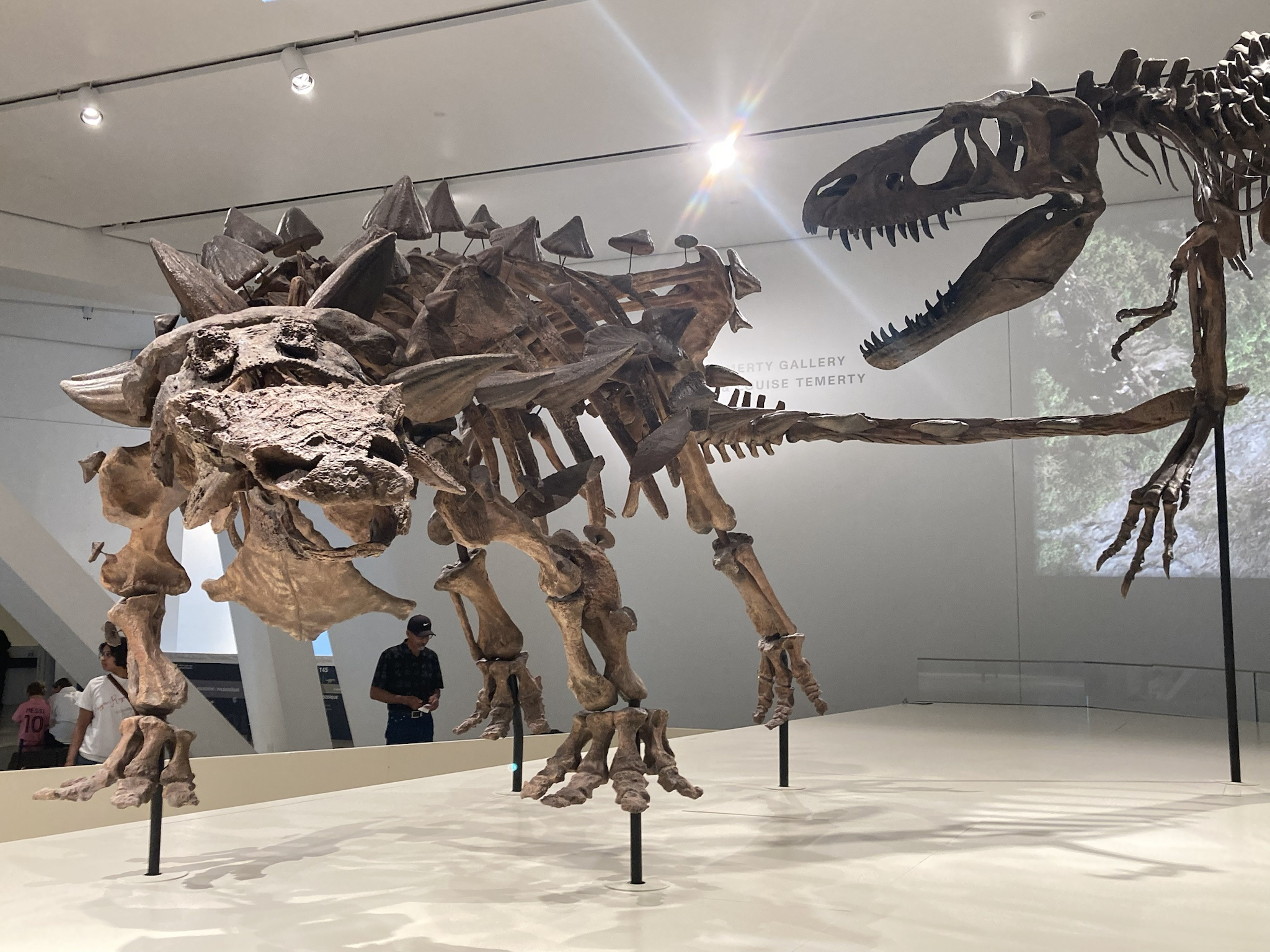
- Reconstructed skeleton at Royal Ontario Museum

Scientific classification
- Kingdom: Animalia
- Phylum: Chordata
- Class: Reptilia
- Clade: Dinosauria
- Clade: †Ornithischia
- Clade: †Thyreophora
- Clade: †Ankylosauria
- Family: †Ankylosauridae
- Subfamily: †Ankylosaurinae
- Tribe: †Ankylosaurini
- Genus: †Zuul; Arbour & Evans, 2017
- Species: †Z. crurivastator

Binomial name
- †Zuul crurivastator Arbour & Evans, 2017

= Zuul =

Zuul Temporal range: Campanian ~75 Ma

Genus of armored ankylosaurine dinosaurs

Zuul is an extinct genus of herbivorous ankylosaurine dinosaur from the Campanian Judith River Formation of Montana. The type species is Zuul crurivastator. It is known from a complete skull and tail, which represents the first ankylosaurin known from a complete skull and tail club, as well as the most complete ankylosaurid specimen thus far recovered from North America. The specimen also preserved in situ osteoderms, keratin, and skin remains.

== Discovery and naming ==
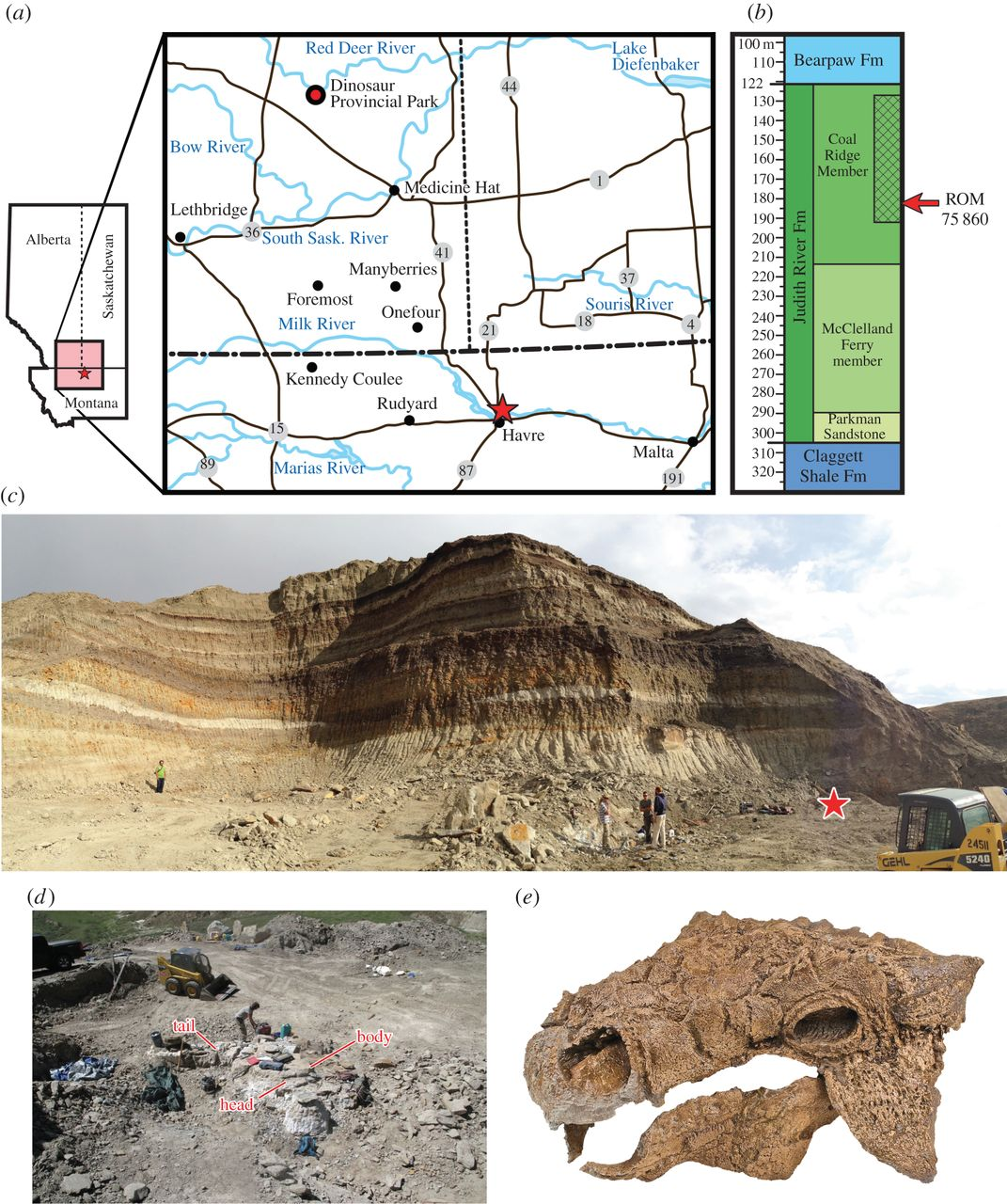
Locality where the holotype was found

In 2014, Theropoda Expeditions LLC was excavating a possible Gorgosaurus specimen near Havre, Montana. On 16 May, a skid-steer loader removing a 12 m (39 ft)-high overburden unexpectedly hit upon an ankylosaurian tail club. An almost complete ankylosaur skeleton proved to be present. As it had not been eroded on the surface, it was in pristine condition. It was found overturned, with the stomach facing upwards. The skeleton was largely articulated, but the skull and some neck vertebrae were separated from the main torso, while five ribs and the left ilium had shifted from their original position. The company secured the specimen in two main blocks, the largest of which weighed over 15 tonnes (17 tons).

Initially identified as a new species of Euoplocephalus, the scientific importance of the specimen was immediately recognised. After preparation of the skull and tail section, Theropoda Expeditions offered it for sale. The company nicknamed the specimen "Sherman". In June 2016, it was acquired by the Canadian Royal Ontario Museum. The museum performed a laser scan of the skull, allowing its original form to be determined by the process of retro-deformation, or compensating for compression of the fossil. In 2017, before the torso had been prepared, a preliminary description was published of the skull and tail.

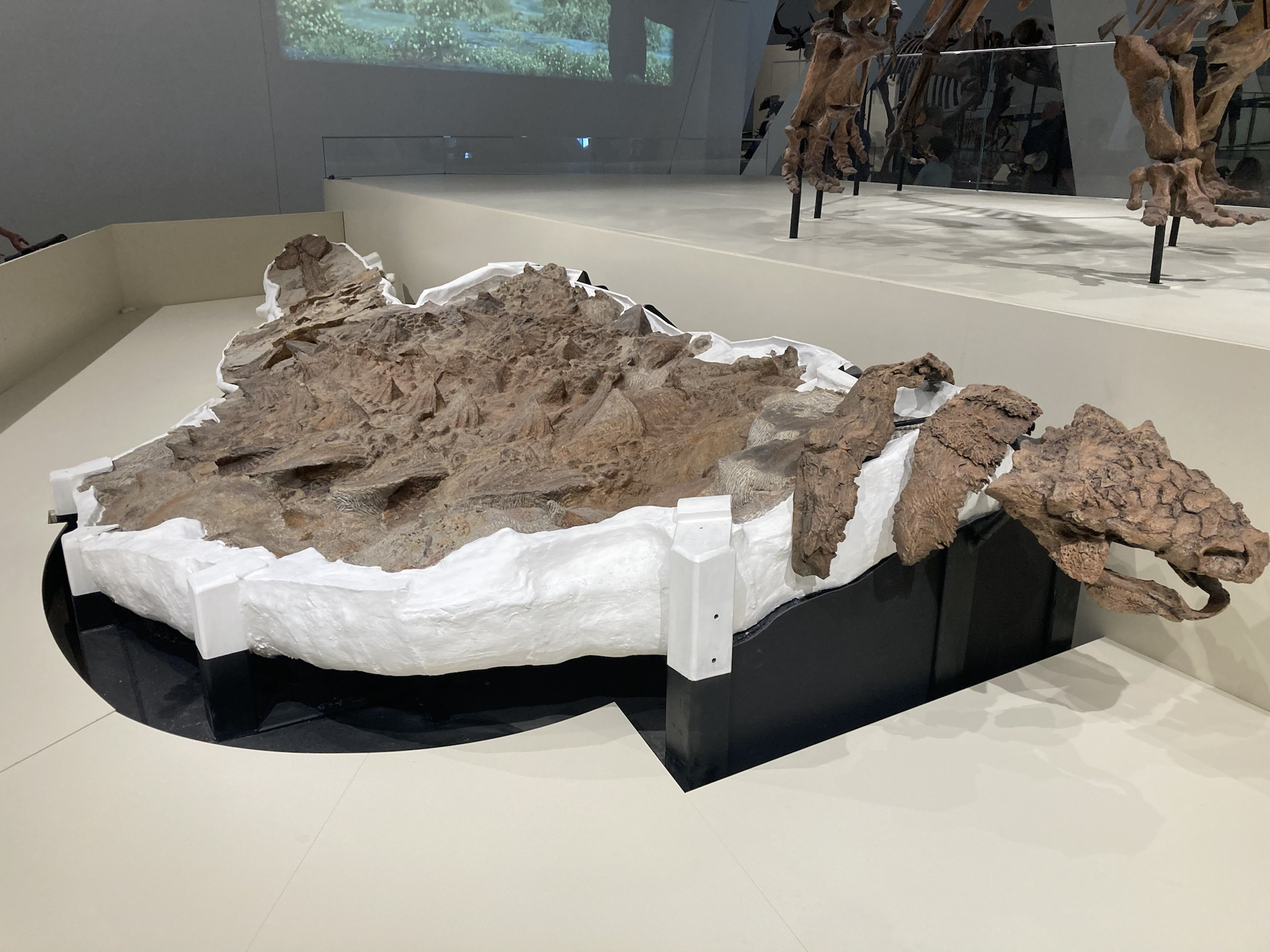
Holotype specimen on display at Royal Ontario Museum

In 2017, based on the specimen the type species Zuul crurivastator was named and described by Arbour and Evans. The generic name was adopted from the demon and demi-god Zuul, the Gatekeeper of Gozer, featured in the 1984 film Ghostbusters. This was due to Zuul's head resembling that of an ankylosaur. The specific name is derived from Latin crus, "shank", and vastator, "destroyer". The epithet, read as "Destroyer of Shins" by the naming authors, refers to a presumed defensive tactic of ankylosaurids, smashing the lower legs of attacking predatory theropods with their tail clubs.

The specimen, which is stored as ROM 75860, was found in a sandstone layer of the Judith River Formation, part of the middle Coal Ridge Member with an age of between 76.2 and 75.2 million years. According to Theropoda Expeditions, it was 99% complete. It was described as a "dinosaur mummy", due to its preservation of soft tissues. Many osteoderms and small ossicles of the armour are present in their original position. Additionally, there are remains of keratin sheaths of the spikes and of keratin, non-bony, scales, in the form of a black film. The specimen is, as of 2017, the most complete ankylosaur find from the Judith River Formation. It was also the first North American ankylosaur specimen with well-preserved material from both the skull and tail.

== Description ==
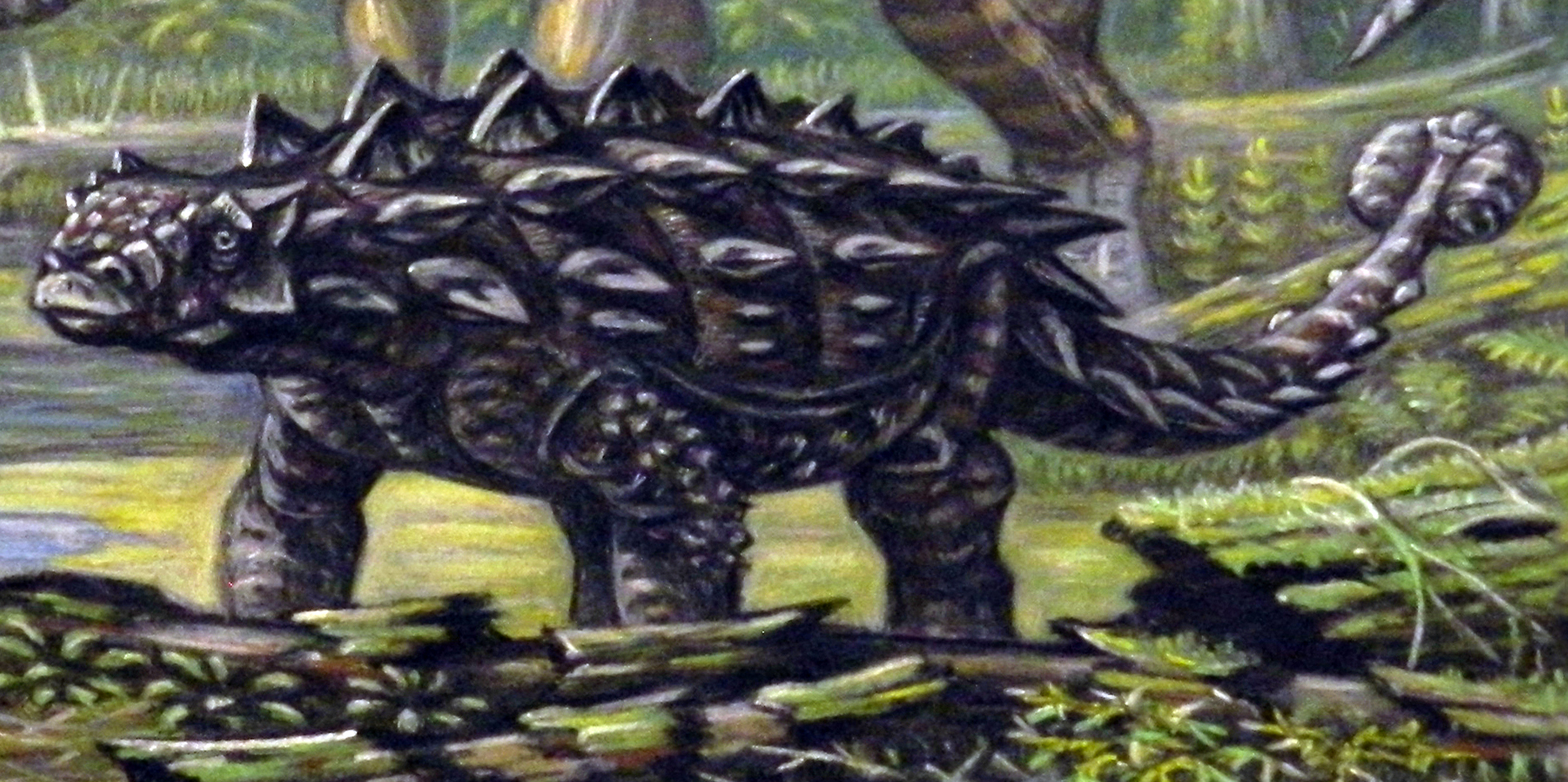
Life restoration

Zuul is estimated to have been 6 metres (20 ft) long. The describing authors of Zuul, Victoria Arbour and David Evans, noted some distinguishing traits of Zuul. Some of these were autapomorphies, unique characters which set Zuul apart from all other known ankylosaurids. The caputegulae, armour tiles of the head, that lay on the nasal bones, the frontals and the parietals, are imbricated, overlapping, and pointed on top. The squamosal horns, on the rear corners of the skull roof, have conspicuous longitudinal grooves on their side surfaces. The osteoderms on the side of the tail, the knob itself excepted, have a front edge with a strongly hollow profile, while their points are off-set to the rear. The tail knob is vertically flattened with a height less than a fifth of the length.

Other traits were not unique but distinguished Zuul from various relatives in the Ankylosaurinae. The caputegulae on the prefrontals, the frontoparietals and the middle supraorbitals are pyramid-shaped, in contrast to the conical caputegulae with Nodocephalosaurus and Talarurus. The squamosal horn protrudes to behind the rear edge of the skull roof, just as with Scolosaurus but different from Anodontosaurus, Euoplocephalus or Ziapelta. The caputegulae behind the eye socket are small and sparsely distributed, again like Scolosaurus but differing from Anodontosaurus, Euoplocephalus or Ziapelta. The osteoderms on the handle of the tail club are relatively larger and more pointed than those of Asian ankylosaurines of the Nemegt Formation of Mongolia.

=== Skull ===
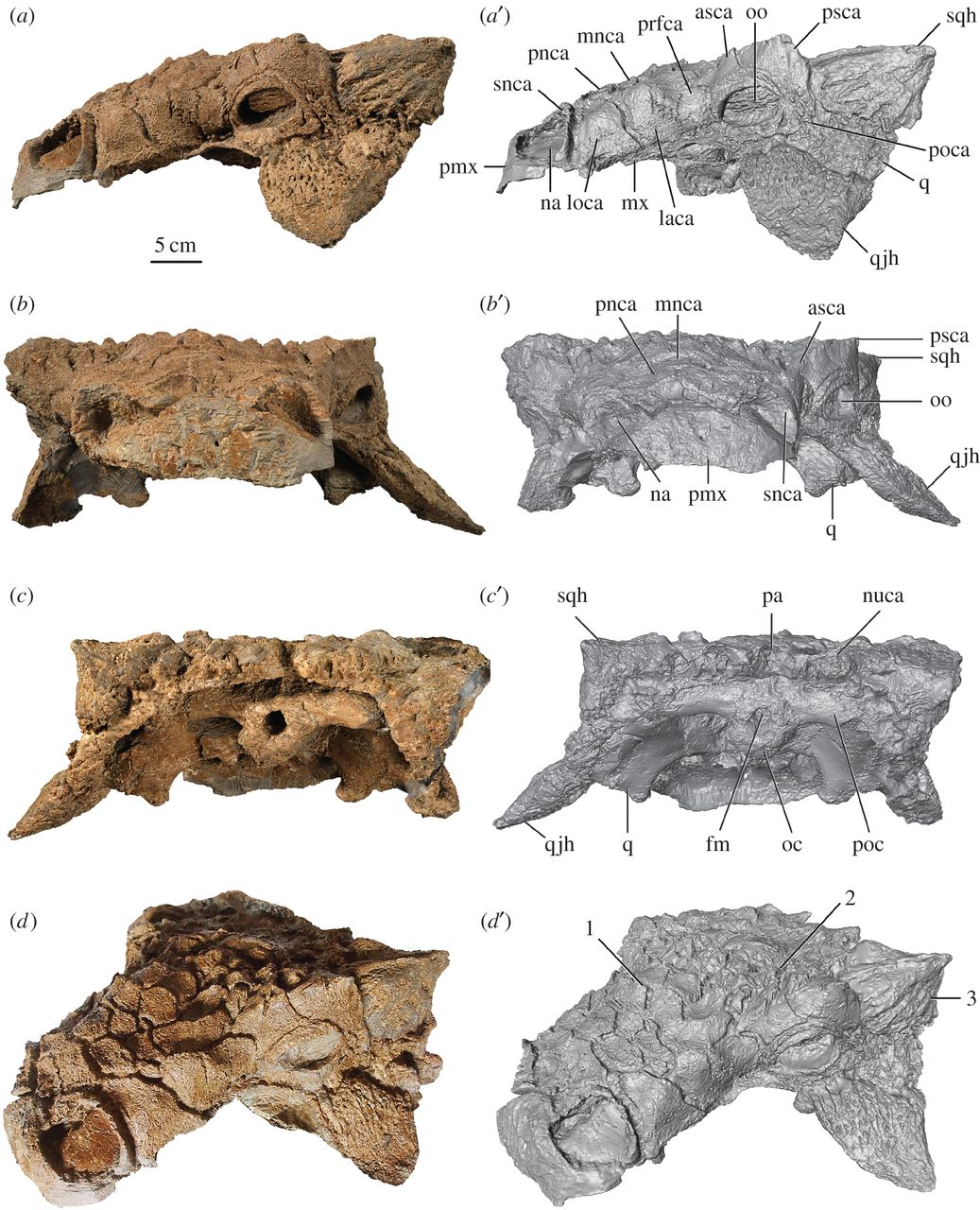
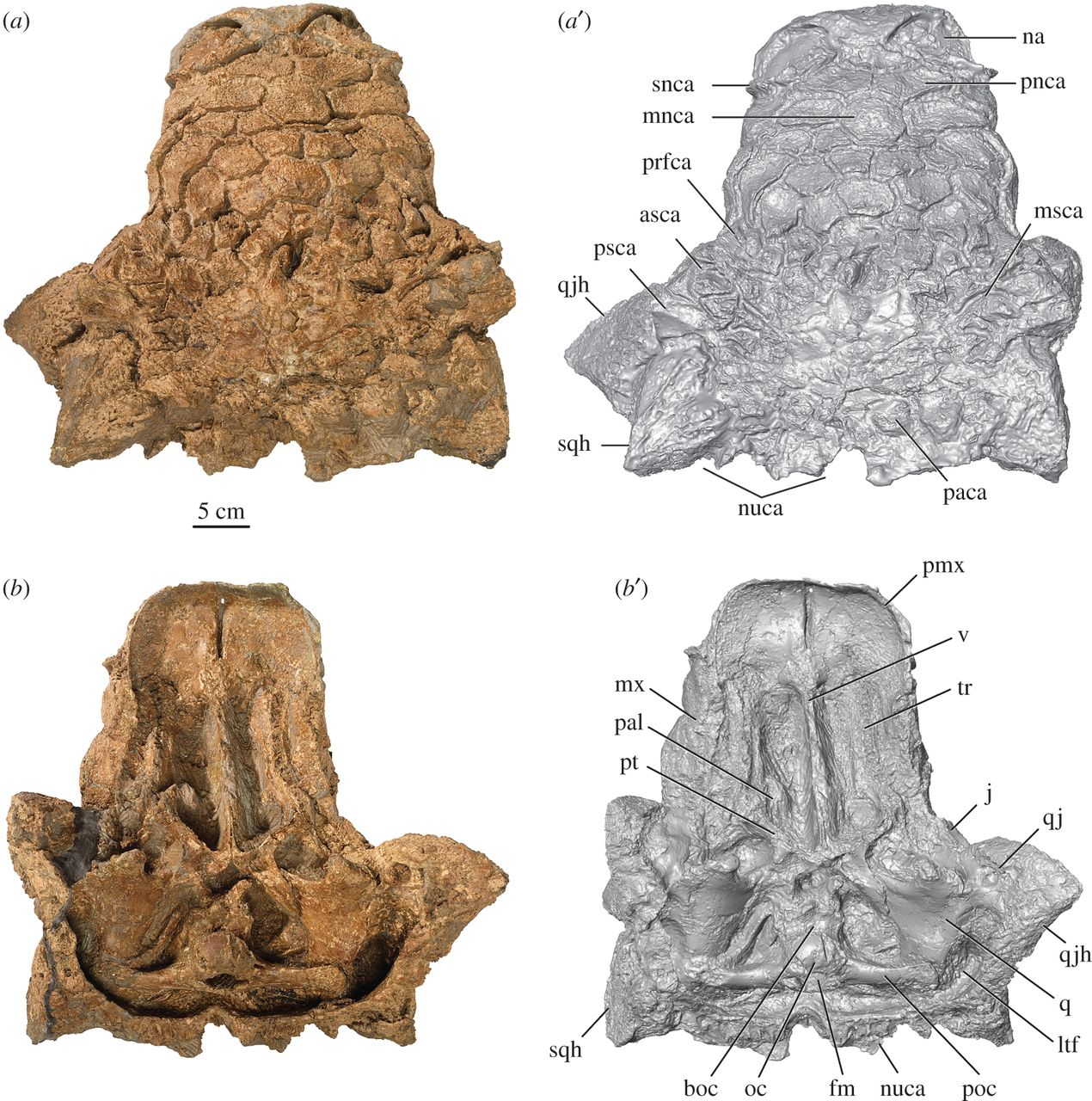
Skull in multiple views, with digital model

With a length of about 50 centimetres (20 in), the skull of Zuul is of considerable size, being only surpassed among the ankylosaurs of Laramidia (western North America) by the three known skulls of Ankylosaurus, specimens AMNH 5214, AMNH 5895 and CMN 8880. The skull is also rather flat but this is partly caused by compression. The snout is wide and truncated at the front. The bony nostrils are pointing to the front. In each nostril only a single nasal opening is visible, perhaps homologous to "Aperture A" in related species.

Behind a narrow pair of nasal armour plates, rows of caputegulae stretch to the rear. The two front rows consists of pairs of rectangular plates. Part of the third row is a small central hexagonal caputegula. More to the back, the osteoderms all become square or hexagonal in profile and more strongly imbricating. Above the eye socket the front and rear supraorbitals form a sharp edge, protruding sideways. Deep in each eye socket, a bony plate is present. Similar plates in specimens of Euoplocephalus and Dyoplosaurus were reported by Walter Preston Coombs as bony eyelids. The squamosal horns on the rear corners of the skull roof are robust and pyramidal in shape. They have a sharp keel on top and deep grooves running towards the tip. The quadratojugal horns on the lower cheeks are also robust, with a convex front edge and a straight rear edge. They were seen as being mainly outgrowths of the quadratojugal bones themselves.

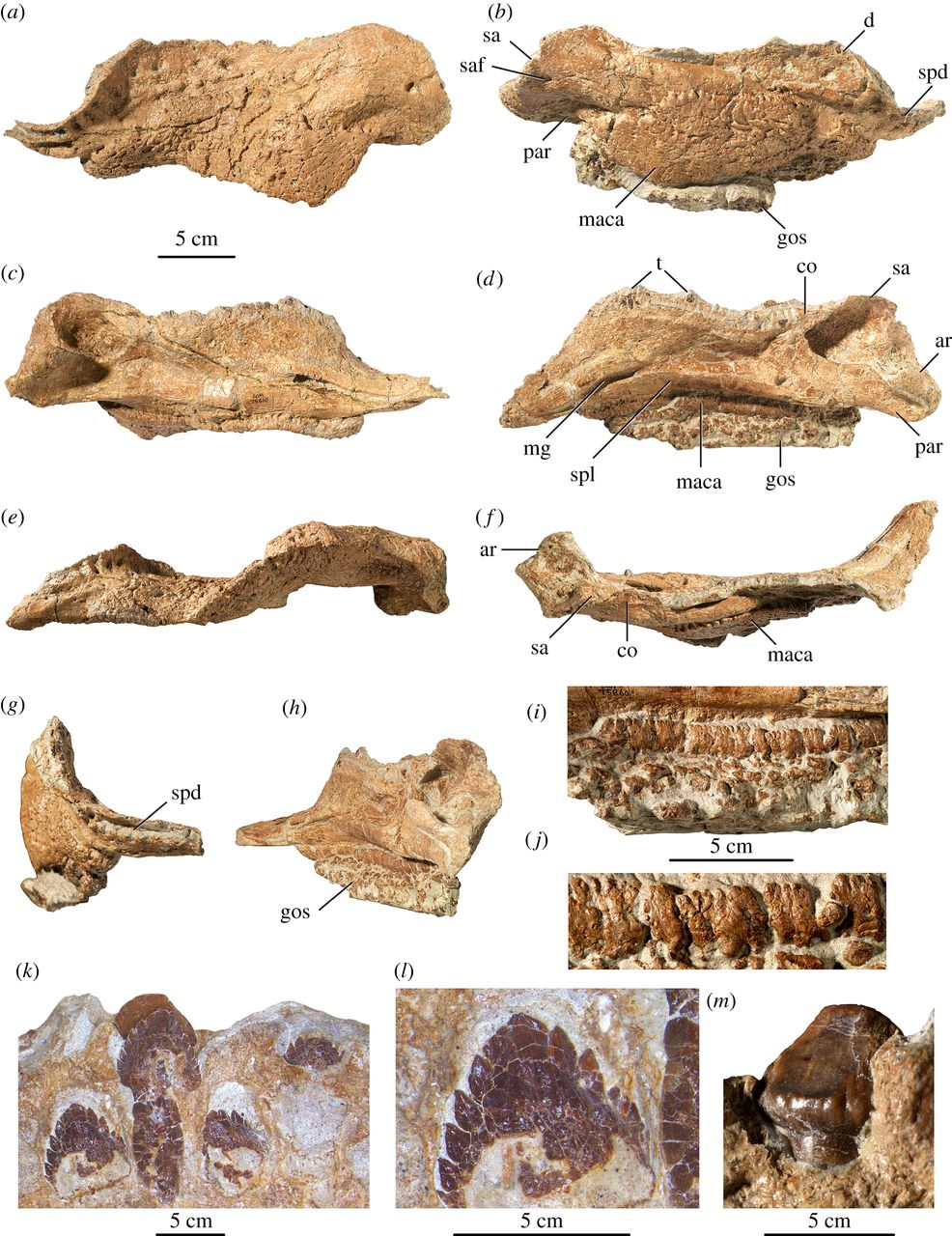
Lower jaws and teeth

The lower jaw is long and low. At its rear side, a large armour plate is present. According to Arbour and Evans, this is not a fused osteoderm, but instead an outgrowth of the jaw bones themselves. The adductor fossa, the opening through which the muscles closing the jaw entered its hollow inside, is relatively small and shallow. The dentary, the bone bearing the teeth, at the front curves sharply to the inside. This way both dentaries together had a profile fitting in the broad snout. The tooth row has a length of about 16 centimetres (6.3 in).

At the rear underside of the right lower jaw numerous ossicles, small bony scales, are visible. The largest of these are rectangular and up to 14 mm (0.55 in) high. They lie directly below the large armour plate. Even lower, rows of smaller hexagonal or diamond-shaped ossicles are positioned, of about 6 mm (0.24 in) in diameter, grouped in rosettes.

The teeth are placed in tooth rows which together have a fluted profile. The tooth rows of the upper jaws bear about eighteen to twenty teeth. Those of the lower jaws bear twenty-eight teeth. The teeth are small, leaf-shaped and transversely flattened. The front teeth of the dentary have a base width, measured from the front to the rear, of about 6 mm (0.24 in). Their crown height is about 7 mm (0.28 in). The teeth have in total twelve to fourteen cusps on their edges. The cusp forming the tip of the tooth is off-set to behind. Around the neck of the crown, a thickened cingulum, or shelf, is present.

=== Tail ===
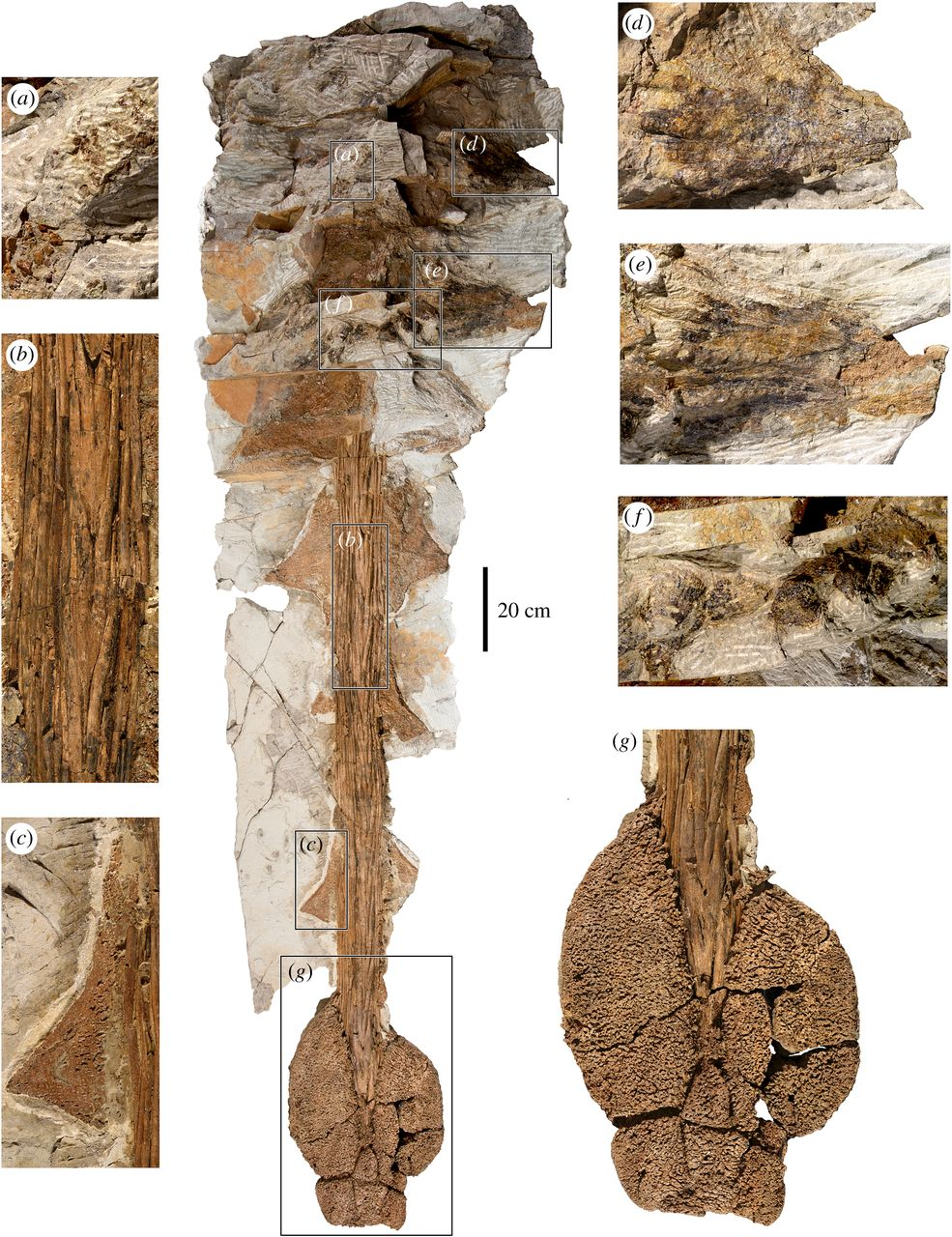
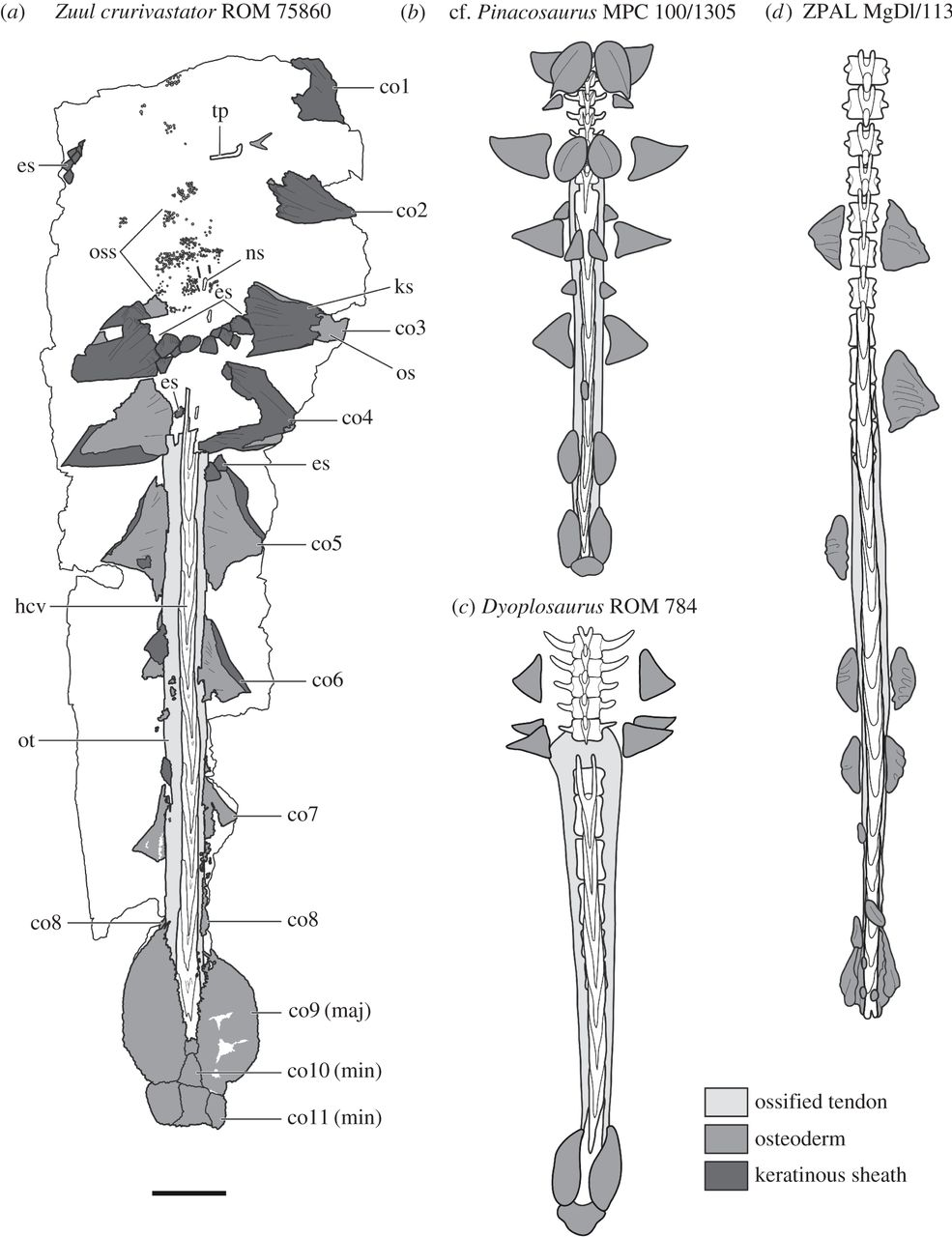
Closeups of Zuul tail anatomy (left) and comparisons with other ankylosaurs (right)

Of the remainder of the skeleton only the tail had been prepared in 2017. The tail has a total length of 278 centimetres (109 in). The tail is divided into "free" front caudal vertebrae of the base and a "tail club" at the rear. In the latter organ Coombs distinguished again a "handle" and a "knob". The tail club, including the handle, has a length of 210 centimetres (83 in), a record among North American ankylosaurids.

In the handle, thirteen vertebrae are present. Probably another three are covered by the knob. To increase the chance of a damaging plastic deformation on impact of the knob, the handle is a stiff structure, the lack of flexibility caused by special connections between the vertebrae. The paired front joint processes, the prezygapophyses, are strongly elongated and overlap half of the preceding vertebra. They form a V-like structure, the branches angled at about 20°. Their joint facets are rotated to above and embrace the neural spine of the preceding vertebra. This spine is wedge-shaped and bent to behind with a flat top surface to fit into the V. This way a series of interlocking connections is formed, covering the entire top surface of the handle. The handle is further stiffened by bundles of ossified tendons, closely appressed to the vertebral sides. The tendons are over 50 centimetres (20 in) long and 5–8 mm (0.20–0.31 in) in diameter, with tapering ends.

Along the sides of the handle runs a series of five pairs of osteoderms. Zuul is the first American ankylosaurid in which such handle osteoderms have actually been discovered; they had only been assumed for other species. On the free vertebrae of the tail base another three pairs are present. Between the large osteoderms smaller ossicles are positioned. The side tail osteoderms are flattened and have a triangular profile in top view, with a sharp point. Those more at the front have a sharper point, being longer than wide. They are almost shaped as an equilateral triangle with straight front and rear edges. More to behind the triangles are lower and wider. From the fifth pair onwards the front edges become longer and strongly concave, off-setting the point to the rear. The last pair, immediately before the knob, is strongly rounded.

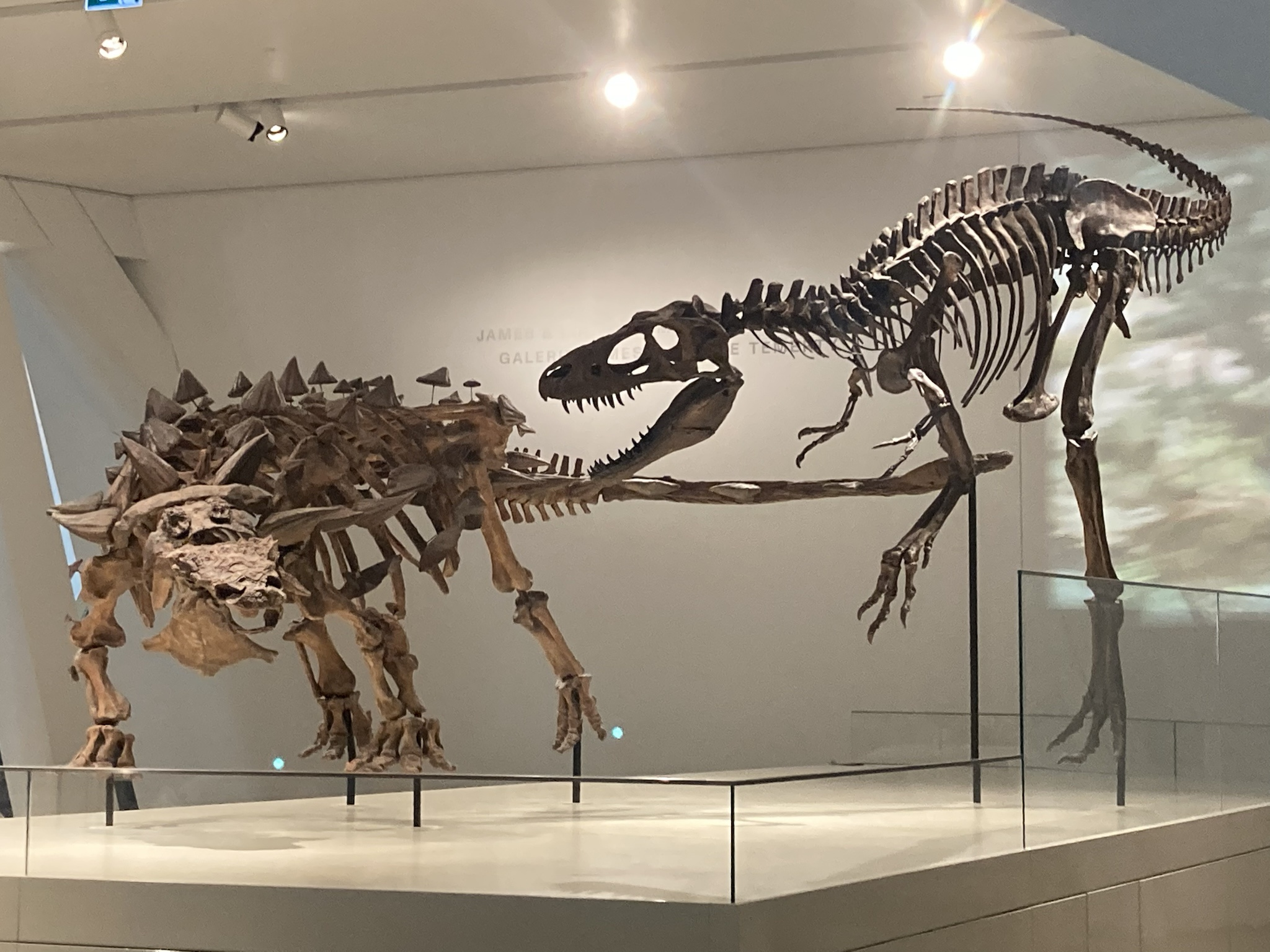
Zuul mounted using its tail club to defend against Gorgosaurus

The front three side osteoderm pairs are covered by a black film that could be the remnant of their original keratin sheaths. If so, these added 1–2 centimetres (0.39–0.79 in) to their length. The sheaths show clear grooves and ridges directed towards the point. At the left osteoderm of the third pair, a layered structure is visible at its base, resembling the construction of horn bases in bovids. At the rear osteoderms, the film covering is incomplete, showing that the underlying bone structure does not conform to the sheath riles as it is much smoother.

The knob is relatively large with a length of 52.5 centimetres (20.7 in), a width of 36.8 centimetres (14.5 in), and a vertical height of 8 centimetres (3.1 in). The bulk of the knob is formed by a pair of large osteoderms, each positioned at the side. In the holotype individual, the left side osteoderm is distinctively longer than the right one, giving the knob as whole a rather asymmetrical profile. This osteoderm also overlaps the last left triangular spike. The general profile of the knob is oval as spikes or keels are lacking. The side osteoderms almost touch each other at the top surface; at the underside a midline hiatus is present. At the rear of the knob, a cluster of small osteoderms is positioned. The outer corners of this cluster are formed by two trapezium-shaped elements. The very rear is formed by a covering triangular midline osteoderm. As a whole, the rear cluster has a straight posterior edge in top view. The bone tissue of the knob has a sponge-like texture with many pits.

Apart from these bony structures, the tail also preserves non-bony scales. These are not skin impressions but remains of the keratin skin tissue itself. Such fossil scale remains are exceedingly rare. In between the third pair of tail osteoderms a transverse row of five large scales is present. Behind it a further row is visible, running more to below, and containing two scales. The scales are relatively large with a diameter of between 5–6.5 centimetres (2.0–2.6 in). In cross-section, they have the form of a truncated cone with a rounded top pointing somewhat to behind. More dispersed scales are visible at the base of the fourth osteoderm pair and the front base of the fifth pair.

== Classification ==
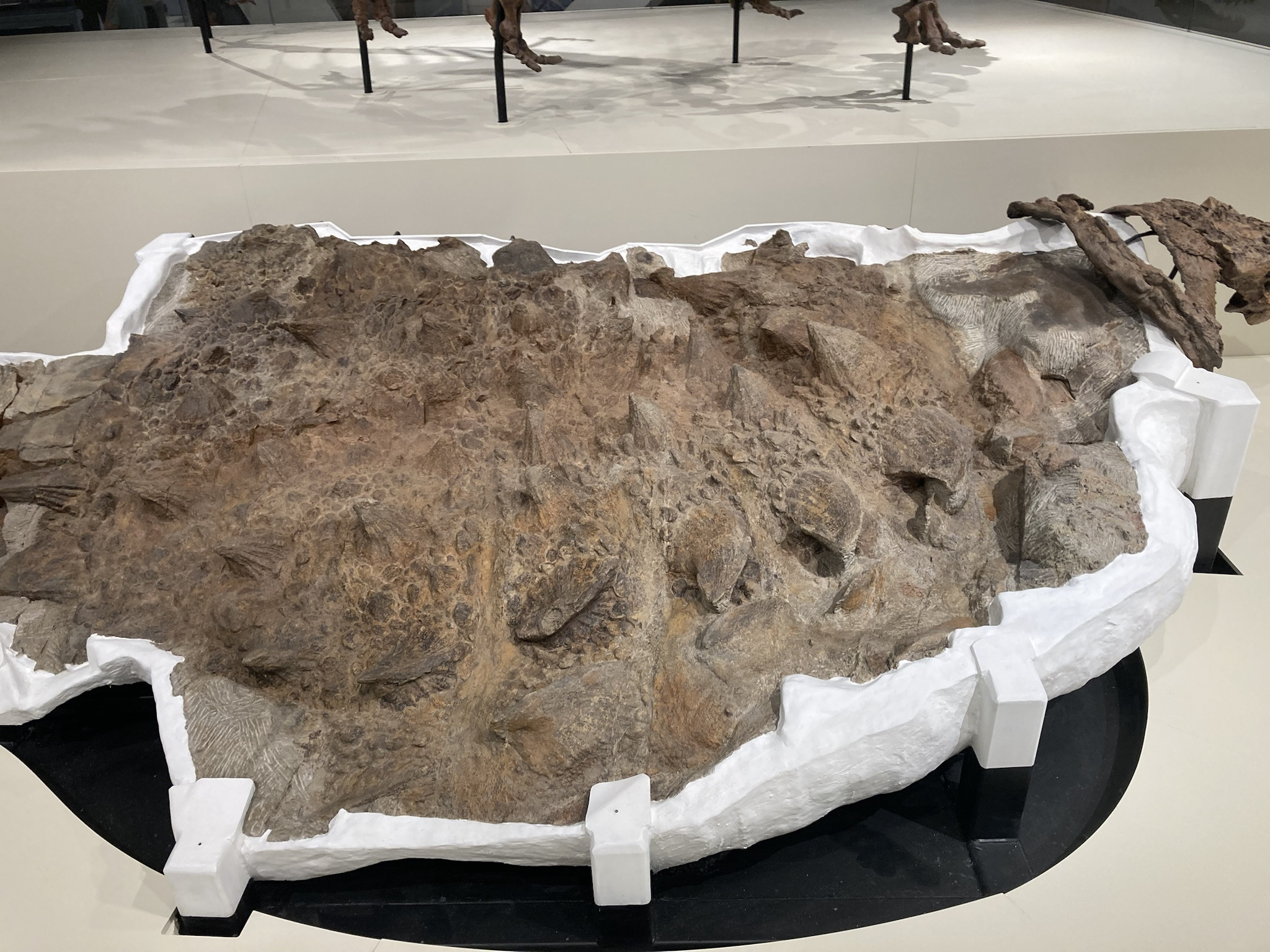
Preserved armor and integument along the torso

In 2017, Arbour and Evans placed Zuul within the Ankylosauridae, based on a phylogenetic analysis. More specifically, they identified it as an ankylosaurin ankylosaurine ankylosaurid, forming a clade with Ankylosaurus, Anodontosaurus, Dyoplosaurus and Scolosaurus. Although the consensus of the phylogenetic trees recovered by the analysis was inconclusive regarding the interrelationships of ankylosaurins, this was influenced mainly by the relative placements of Anodontosaurus and Ziapelta within the tree. Out of the ten most parsimonious trees they recovered, nine of them have Zuul as the sister group of Dyoplosaurus, while in the remaining tree Zuul is closer to Anodontosaurus. The consensus of 50% of the trees is reproduced below for ankylosaurin interrelationships; the remainder follows the full consensus of all of the trees.

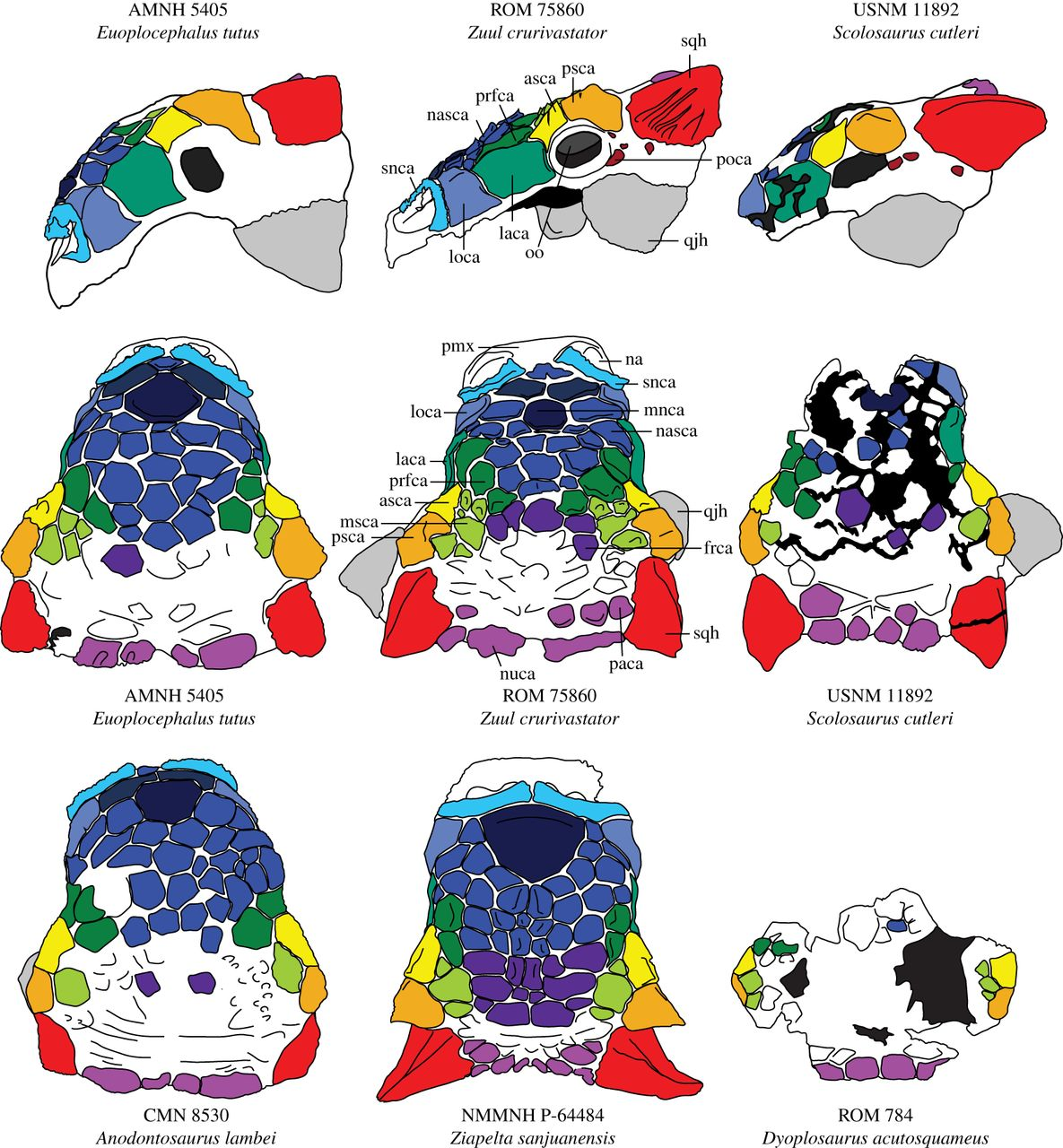
Cranial ornamentation of Zuul and other ankylosaurins

- Ankylosaurinae
  - Zhejiangosaurus luoyangensis
  - - - Pinacosaurus grangeri
      - Pinacosaurus mephistocephalus
    - - - Tsagantegia longicranialis
        - - Talarurus plicatospineus
          - Nodocephalosaurus kirtlandensis
      - - - Saichania chulsanensis
          - - Zaraapelta nomadis
            - Tarchia kielanae
        - Ankylosaurini
          - Ziapelta sanjuanensis
          - - Euoplocephalus tutus
            - - Ankylosaurus magniventris
              - - Anodontosaurus lambei
                - - Scolosaurus cutleri
                  - - Zuul crurivastator
                    - Dyoplosaurus acutosquameus

== See also ==
- Timeline of ankylosaur research
- 2017 in archosaur paleontology
