= Crichtonpelta =

Crichtonpelta Temporal range: Late Cretaceous, ~99–95 Ma

Scientific classification
- Kingdom: Animalia
- Phylum: Chordata
- Class: Reptilia
- Clade: Dinosauria
- Clade: †Ornithischia
- Clade: †Thyreophora
- Clade: †Ankylosauria
- Family: †Ankylosauridae
- Subfamily: †Ankylosaurinae
- Genus: †Crichtonpelta; Arbour & Currie, 2015
- Species: †C. benxiensis

Binomial name
- †Crichtonpelta benxiensis (Lü et al., 2007)

Synonyms
- Crichtonsaurus benxiensis Lü et al., 2007

Extinct genus of dinosaurs

Crichtonpelta is a genus of extinct herbivorous ankylosaurid dinosaur from the Late Cretaceous (Cenomanian) of China.

== Discovery and naming ==
In 2007, Lü Junchang, Ji Qiang, Gao Yubo and Li Zhixin named and described a second species of Crichtonsaurus: Crichtonsaurus benxiensis. The specific name refers to the Benxi Geological Museum.

The holotype, BXGMV0012, is a skull found near Beipiao in a layer of the Sunjiawan Formation probably dating from the early Cenomanian (~99–95 Ma). Specimen BXGMV0012-1, a skeleton lacking the skull, discovered in the same quarry as the holotype, was referred to the species. Furthermore, a skeleton with skull, displayed by the Sihetun Fossil Museum as a Crichtonsaurus bohlini specimen, was in 2014 referred to Crichtonpelta. In 2017, a fourth specimen was described, from the same quarry as the holotype, G20090034, consisting of a skull lacking the front snout.

In 2014, Victoria Arbour concluded that Crichtonsaurus were a nomen dubium. Therefore, she named a separate genus for its second species: Crichtonpelta. The generic name combines a reference to Michael Crichton, the author of Jurassic Park, with a Greek πέλτη, peltè, "small shield". At the time this was an invalid nomen ex dissertatione. However, in 2015, Crichtonpelta was validly named by Arbour and Philip John Currie. The type species is Crichtonsaurus benxiensis; the combinatio nova is Crichtonpelta benxiensis. There was a possibility that, though Crichtonsaurus bohlini was a nomen dubium, its fossil material in fact belonged to Crichtonpelta. Arbour however, noted clear differences in the scapula and humerus between BXGMV0012-1 and LPM 101, a specimen previously referred to Crichtonsaurus bohlini: the scapula of the former has a tab-like acromion and its humerus a much longer deltopectoral crest.

== Description ==
Arbour established several distinguishing traits. One of these was an autapomorphy, unique derived trait: the apex of the (quadrato)jugal, or cheek, horn, is pointing upwards. Also a unique combination of in themselves not unique traits is present. The upper snout armour forms an amorphous mass, not clearly separated into distinctive tiles. The jugal bone is deeper than that of Pinacosaurus. The skull roof is not notched at the lacrimal bone as in Pinacosaurus grangeri. The squamosal horns are shorter than those of Pinacosaurus mephistocephalus. However, these horns are longer and more pointed than those of Gobisaurus or Shamosaurus. The point of the cheek horn is located on the rear edge. The transverse crest on the top of the rear skull has two points.

The holotype of Crichtonpelta is somewhat larger than Crichtonsaurus, itself about 3 to 4 metres (9.8 to 13.1 ft) long. It is uncertain whether the animal already possessed a tail club.

== Classification ==
Crichtonpelta was, within the Ankylosauridae, placed in the Ankylosaurinae, in a basal position. If correct, this makes it the oldest known ankylosaurine.
