= Shanxia =

Shanxia Temporal range: Late Cretaceous, 99–71 Ma

Scientific classification
- Kingdom: Animalia
- Phylum: Chordata
- Class: Reptilia
- Clade: Dinosauria
- Clade: †Ornithischia
- Clade: †Thyreophora
- Clade: †Ankylosauria
- Family: †Ankylosauridae
- Subfamily: †Ankylosaurinae
- Genus: †Shanxia; Barrett et al., 1998
- Species: †S. tianzhenensis

Binomial name
- †Shanxia tianzhenensis Barrett et al., 1998

Extinct genus of dinosaurs

Shanxia (named after the Shanxi Province) is a monospecific genus of ankylosaurid dinosaur from the Shanxi Province that lived during the Late Cretaceous (Cenomanian-Campanian, ~99-71 Ma) in what is now the Huiquanpu Formation. Shanxia may possibly represent a junior synonym of Tianzhenosaurus, an ankylosaurine also known from the Huiquanpu Formation of China.

== Discovery and naming ==
In 1993, Messrs. Lu and Li of the Hebei Geological Survey discovered a partial ankylosaurid skeleton at a locality in the Shanxi Province and notified staff of the Institute of Vertebrate Paleontology and Paleoanthropology, who collected the material later that year. The holotype specimen, IVPP V11276, consists of a braincase, occiput, skull roof, ?quadratojugal, axis vertebra, cervical vertebrae, dorsal vertebrae, caudal vertebrae, humerus, fragment of ?ilium, femora and an osteoderm. The holotype skull is partially reconstructed with plaster to stabilise parts of the skull roof and to attach the skull roof to the braincase. Upchurch & Barrett, 2000 noted that the skull had not been artificially widened or lengthened by excess plaster. The specimen was specifically obtained from the Huiquanpu Formation and is currently housed at the Institute of Vertebrate Paleontology and Paleoanthropology, Beijing.

The generic name, Shanxia, refers to the Shanxi Province which is where the holotype was recovered from. The specific name, tianzhenensis, refers to the Tian Zhen County.

In 1999, Sullivan considered Shanxia as a nomen dubium and as a possible junior syonynm of Tianzhenosaurus. Sullivan noted that the only diagnosable characteristic, the unique shape of the squamosal horn, of Shanxia is known to be variable within a single taxon such as Euoplocephalus. Sullivan also noted that due to the presence of two ankylosaurids in the Huiquanpu Formation, they were likely to represent the same taxon. However, Upchurch & Barrett, 2000 considered Shanxia as a valid taxon based on at least on autapomorphy or diagnostic trait. Thompson et al., 2012 also recovered Shanxia as a valid taxon based on the caudal projection of the squamosal horns, form of cranial armour and haemal arch attachment. Arbour & Currie, 2015 considered that there are no unique characteristics that distinguish Shanxia from Tianzhenosaurus, and Tianzhenosaurus from Saichania, an ankylosaurid from the Barun Goyot and Nemegt Formation.

== Description ==
Due to the fragmentary nature of the holotype specimen, not much information is known about the exact size and appearance of Shanxia.

Barrett et al., 1998 distinguished Shanxia from all other ankylosaurids based on the morphology of the squamosal horns. It was noted that the squamosal horns were slender and elongate, inclined at an angle, having a narrow junction with the skull roof in occipital view, and shaped like isosceles triangles in dorsal view. An isolated quadratojugal was tentatively assigned to Shanxia and shares similar features to Euoplocephalus. The quadratojugal was described as sub-triangular in shape and generally similar to the quadratojugal horns of other ankylosaurids. Upchurch and Barrett, 2000 established two more additional distinguishing characteristics of Shanxia that differentiate it from other ankylosaurids, including Saichania, which include the absence of a large processus medialis humeri and a pair of large domed sub-rectangular osteoderms on the skull. However, similar ossifications are present in Tianzhenosaurus. The holotype specimen only preserves one osteoderm, which has been described as oval in outline, sub-triangular in cross-section, excavated ventrally and has a prominent dorsal keel.

Barrett et al., 1998 noted that the holotype specimen preserves a possible synapomorphy with nodosaurids, the hemispherical occipital condyle is oval to subcircular in posterior view and offset from the braincase by a distinct 'neck'. However, they did state that some caution is needed in the interpretation of the synapomorphy as the shape of the occipital condyle is not entirely clear and may be primitive for Ankylosauria as the feature is also present in Tarchia, Talarurus, and Maleevus.

== Classification ==
Barrett et al. (1998) originally considered Shanxia as an ankylosaurid with unknown affiliations, but Sullivan (1999) considered Shanxia as a nomen dubium, and possibly synonymous with the ankylosaurid Tianzhenosaurus, arguing that the unique shape of the squamosal horns could be a product of individual variation. However, Upchurch and Barrett (2000) reaffirmed the validity of Shanxia and recognised two new distinguishing characteristics. Thompson et al. (2012) recovered Shanxia as an ankylosaurine, sister taxon to “Crichtonsaurus” benxiensis and more basal than Tianzhenosaurus, while Arbour and Currie (2015) recovered Shanxia as a junior synonym of Tianzhenosaurus. A 2018 study by Wiersma and Irmis considered Shanxia as a valid taxon, and sister taxon to Tarchia kielanae and Minotaurasaurus ramachandrani.

A phylogenetic analysis conducted by Thompson et al., 2012 is reproduced below.

- - - Huayangosaurus taibaii
    - Stegosaurus armatus
  - - Nodosauridae
    - Ankylosauridae
      - Minmi paravertebra
      - - Liaoningosaurus paradoxus
        - - Cedarpelta bilbeyhallorum
          - - Gobisaurus domoculus
            - - Shamosaurus scutatus
              - - Zhongyuansaurus luoyangensis
                - Tsagantegia longicranialis
                - - - Shanxia tianzhenensis
                    - - "Crichtonsaurus" benxiensis
                      - - Dyoplosaurus acutosquameus
                        - Pinacosaurus mephistocephalus
                  - - - Ankylosaurus magniventris
                      - Euoplocephalus tutus
                    - - - Minotaurasaurus ramachandrani
                        - Pinacosaurus grangeri
                      - - Nodocephalosaurus kirtlandensis
                        - - - Talarurus plicatospineus
                            - Tianzhenosaurus youngi
                          - - Saichania chulsanensis
                            - Tarchia gigantea

== Paleoenvironment ==
The holotype specimen of Shanxia was recovered from the Huiquanpu Formation, which possibly dates to the Cenomanian or Campanian stage of the Late Cretaceous. Due to the absence of index fossils, a precise dating is problematic. The proposed Cretaceous date is based in part on the discovery of pliosaur fossils. The formation represents a fluvial environment, with the upper part of the formation being extensively reworked by a number of early Tertiary volcanic intrusions. Shanxia would have coexisted with the sauropod Huabeisaurus, the ornithopod Datonglong, the tyrannosauroid Jinbeisaurus and the ankylosaurid Tianzhenosaurus.

== See also ==
- Timeline of ankylosaur research
