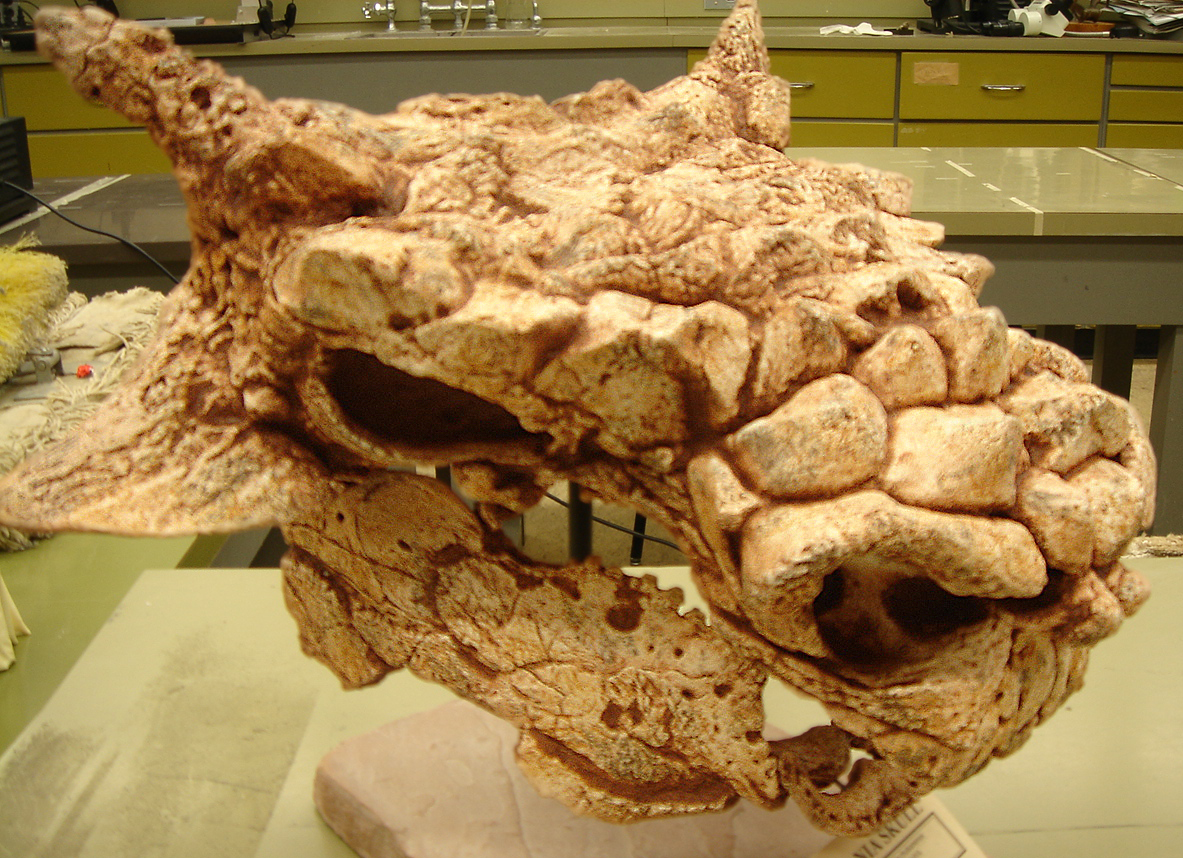
- Cast of the holotype skull of Minotaurasaurus.

Scientific classification
- Kingdom: Animalia
- Phylum: Chordata
- Class: Reptilia
- Clade: Dinosauria
- Clade: †Ornithischia
- Clade: †Thyreophora
- Clade: †Ankylosauria
- Family: †Ankylosauridae
- Subfamily: †Ankylosaurinae
- Genus: †Minotaurasaurus; Miles & Miles, 2009
- Species: †M. ramachandrani

Binomial name
- †Minotaurasaurus ramachandrani Miles & Miles, 2009

= Minotaurasaurus =

Minotaurasaurus Temporal range: Late Cretaceous, 75–71 Ma

Extinct genus of dinosaurs

Minotaurasaurus (meaning "Minos'-bull reptile") is a monospecific genus of ankylosaurid dinosaur that lived in Mongolia during the Late Cretaceous (late Campanian stage, ~75-71 Ma) in what is now the Djadochta Formation. The type and only species, Minotaurasaurus ramachandrani, is known from two skulls, a cervical vertebra and a cervical half ring. It was named and described in 2009 by Clifford Miles and Clark Miles. The holotype of Minotaurasaurus has been suspected to be illegally exported out of Mongolia. It has been suggested to be a synonym of Tarchia but more recent publications consider it as a distinct genus.

Minotaurasaurus was a medium-sized ankylosaurid, with an estimated length of 4.2 metres (13.8 feet), although it may have reached larger sizes as the type specimen represents an immature individual. Although not a lot of postcranial material is known, it would have had a tail club that may have been used for protection against predators or interspecific combat and would have been covered in protective osteoderms. It would have also had a barrel-like body, and short, robust limbs based on close relatives.

== Discovery and Naming ==
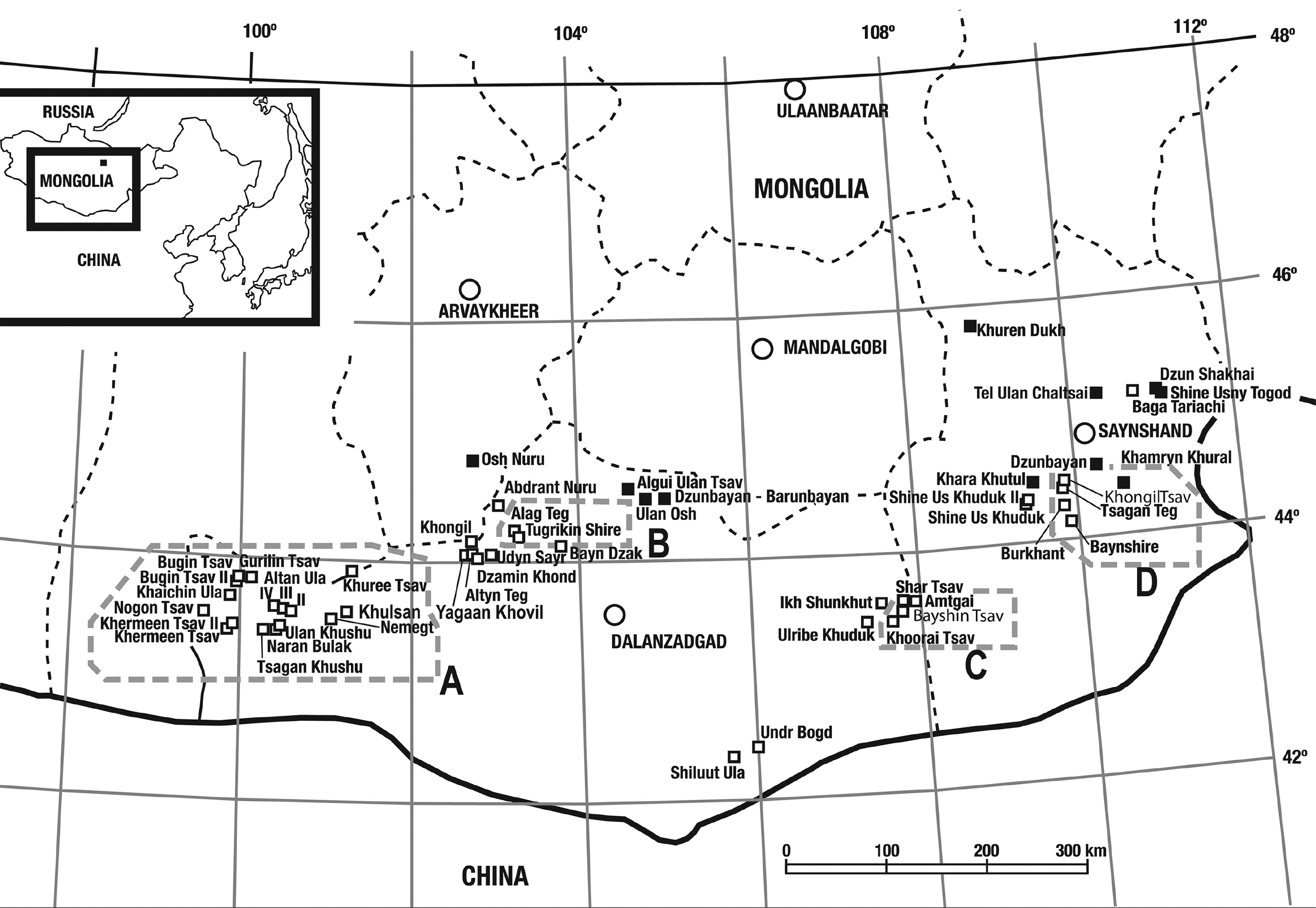
Fossil localities in Mongolia. Minotaurasaurus fossils have been collected at Uhkaa Tolgod (area B)

In 2003, a skull of an ankylosaurid was purchased for US$10,000 by the private fossil collector and neuroscientist Vilayanur S. Ramachandran while accompanied by Clifford Miles at the Tucson Gem, Mineral and Fossil Showcase, Arizona. The skull was put on display by Robert Gaston for the fossil dealer Hollis Butts, who Ramachandran purchased it from.

The stratigraphic position was stated as being from the Gobi Desert of either Mongolia or China due to the provenance being unknown at the time. In 2006, Clifford Miles and his brother Clark Miles attempted to publish the description of the skull in a Polish Journal but was promptly rejected as the specimen was seemingly obtained illegally from Mongolia. Two years later, the authors stated that the specimen had come from the Barun Goyot Formation but later stated that they could not confirm its origin. The skull would later be described and named in 2009. The publication was later criticised by palaeontologists such as Mark Norell, Phillip J. Currie and Bolortsetseg Minjin due to the questionable origins of the specimen.

The holotype specimen, INBR21004, consists of a skull with lower jaws and predentary. The type specimen is currently housed at the Victor Valley Museum in Apple Valley, California. The generic name, Minotaurasaurus, is derived from the Minotaur and the Greek word "sauros" (lizard), in reference to the bull-like appearance of the holotype skull. The specific name, ramachandrani, honours V. S. Ramachandran, who purchased the type specimen.

In 2013, a Society of Vertebrate Paleontology abstract book mentioned the discovery of a second specimen of Minotaurasaurus (MAE 98 179) from the Uhkaa Tolgod locality of the late Campanian Djadochta Formation in the Nemegt Basin. The specimen consists of a skull, axis and first cervical half-ring, and it is part of the collection of the Mongolian Academy of Sciences. MAE 98 179 was reported as having insect burrows that continues into a pattern which is only seen in Late Cretaceous Gobi deposits. Penkalski & Tumanova (2016) would later describe the specimen, which was used to establish the stratigraphic position of the type specimen and the validity of the taxon, as before it was suggested by Arbour et al. (2014) and Arbour & Currie (2015) to be from the Barun Goyot Formation and a junior synonym of Tarchia kielanae. Its validity was also tested by Arbour & Currie (2012) by using a retrodeformation and finite element analysis, which found that many of its diagnostic features were likely not caused by deformation.

== Description ==
=== Size and distinguishing traits ===
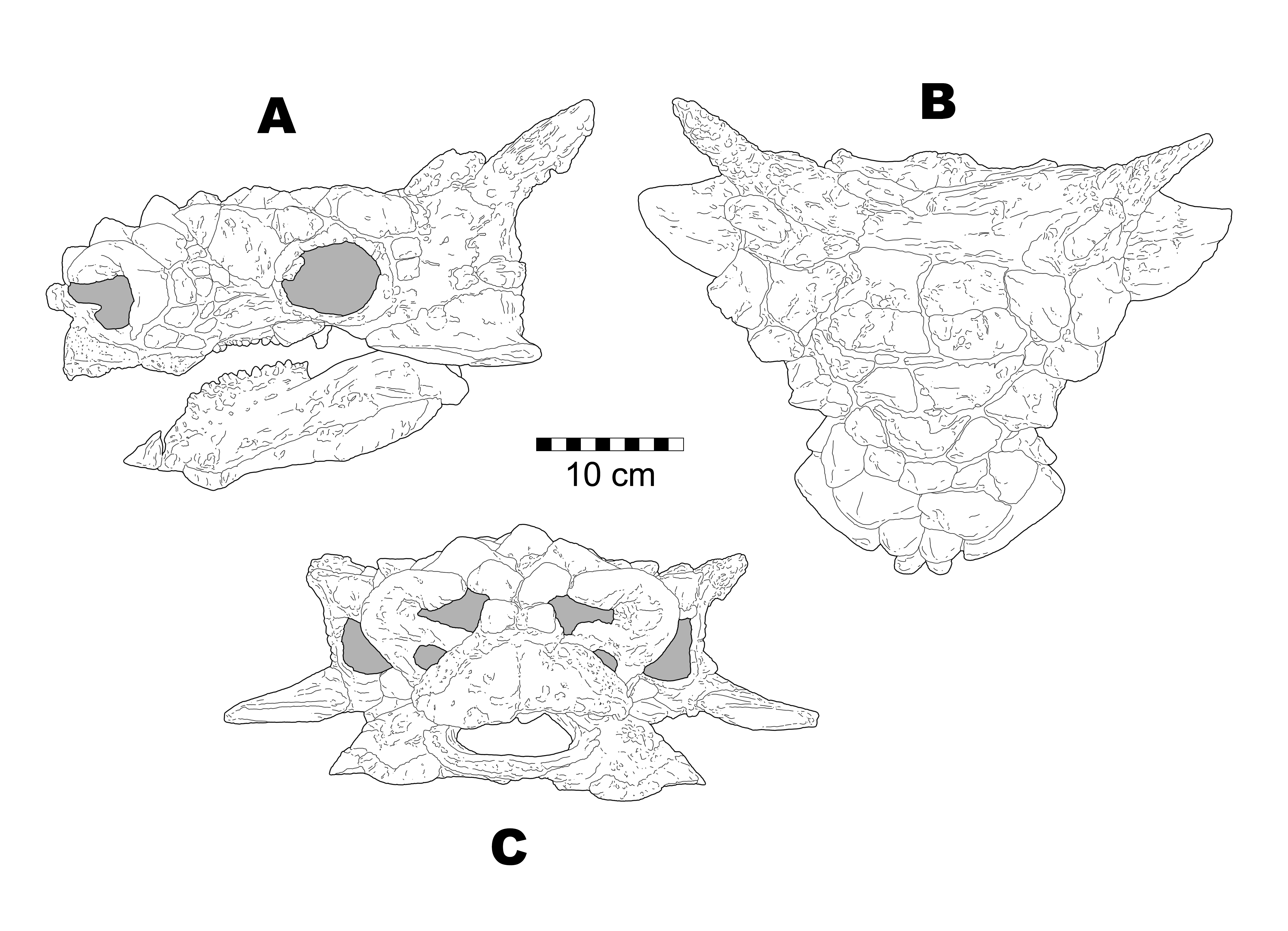
Diagram of the holotype skull

Miles & Miles (2009) gave Minotaurasaurus an estimated length of at least 4.2 metres (13.8 feet), although it may have attained larger sizes as the type specimen, and only known specimen at the time, represents an immature individual based on the unfused osteoderms.

Penkalski & Tumanova (2016) established numerous distinguishing traits of Minotaurasaurus. The paroccipital processes are not present laterally to the squamosal horns due to presence of a small and dorsoventrally shallow occiput. The skull roof possessing an unfused occiput. Basioccipital foramen that are either small or absent. Highly sculptured squamosal horns that are dorsoventrally narrow and cylindrical in shape. Non prominent nuchal caputegulae that angle caudolaterally. The presence of two distinct supraorbital apices. Frontal caputegulae that aren't arranged at right angles but with nasofrontal caputegulae that are elongated transversely and are ridge-like. The presence of a deep notch in the lacrimal. The presence of two pairs of internarial osteoderms, unlike the presence of a single osteoderm as in Tarchia and Saichania. An overall small skull that is broad. A more horizontal pterygoid body. A mandibular osteoderm that extends towards the front end of the tooth row. Other distinguishing traits include the occiput being more visible in dorsal view, an occipital condyle that is protrudes less towards the underside in caudal view and a skull that is proportionally lower and wider than that of Tarchia.

=== Skull ===
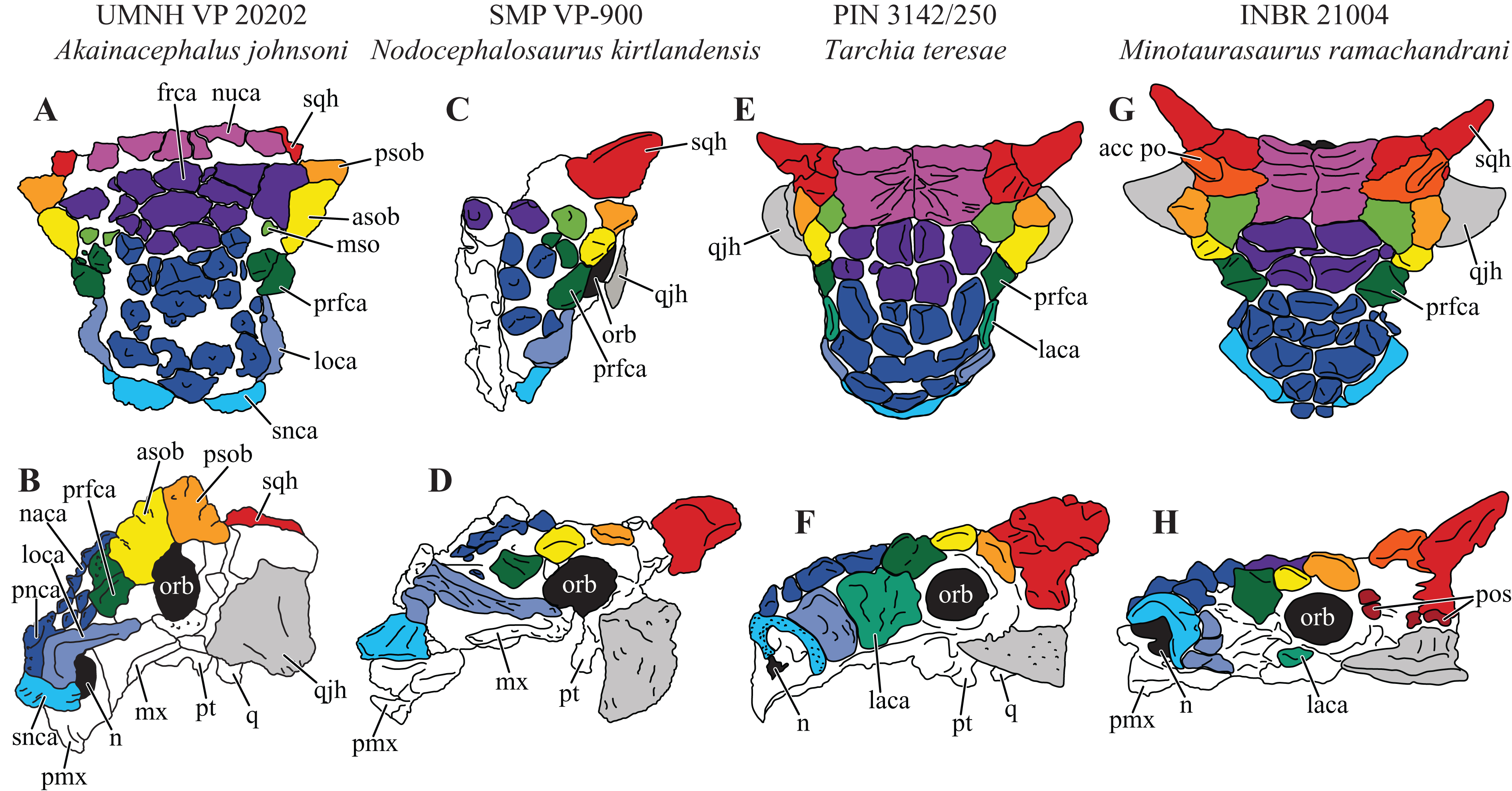
Skull of Minotaurasaurus (far right) compared to other ankylosaurids

The holotype skull measures 30 centimetres (11.8 inches) long and has a width of 43 centimetres (17 inches). Excluding the squamosal horns, the skull is longer than wide. The skull roof has its widest point formed by the squamosal horns. Unlike other ankylosaurids, the squamosal horns are more gracile and tapering. Pyramid-shaped caputegulae cover most of the surface of the skull, with the exception of an area of the skull roof that is near the orbits. The caputegulae are arranged roughly bi-symmetrically on the skull, with two sharp-keeled caputegulae projecting laterally above the orbits and similar caputegulae being present near the prefrontal. Partially fused to unfused caputegulae are present on parts of the skull. Present near the squamosal horn is a furrow, or unfused caputegulum, that is also seen in Tarchia kielanae. The furrow is an artefact of the postorbital osteoderm being within the postorbital fossa. However, unlike Tarchia, the supraoccipital is co-ossified to the parietals. The skull's orbit is tear drop-shaped with a tapered end that points towards the front. The osteoderms of the narial region create a flared look due to how large and ornamented they are, and project towards the front and sides. Present in the narial region are three apertures and the external nasal cavity, which is bound by a single osteoderm. The surface of the premaxillary beak is covered partially by secondary dermal ossifications. An inverted, triangular osteoderm is coossified to the premaxilla along the ventral margin of the narial opening. A sharp premaxillary beak is present as a result of the palatal portions of the premaxillae changing shape from the front end to the back end. Unlike most ankylosaurids, the vomer extends below the maxillary tooth crowns. All teeth are leaf-shaped. There are a total of 17 teeth and alveoli in the left maxilla and 16 in the right maxilla. The maxillary teeth are up to 25% larger than the dentary teeth and have crowns that are variable.

The epipterygoid, a small, triangular structure, separates the pterygoid from the maxilla. Instead of being vertical or even slightly overturned as seen in most ankylosaurids, the main body of the pterygoids is near horizontal which, as a result, makes the interpterygoid vacuity in palatal view. The occipital condyle lacks a neck and is heart-shaped. The occiput is low and rectangular in shape. The paroccipital processes fall well short of the medial edge of the squamosal horn. Both the basisphenoid and basioccipital are fused together, with the sutural area being expanded as a ridge. This ridge marks the insertion for the rectus capitis and longus capitis muscles. Both the left and right jugal horns thrust more towards the sides than towards the underside. Towards the sides of the tooth row is a broad maxillary shelf that extends beneath the middle of the orbit. A long, narrow osteoderm is partially fused along each side of the mandible but does not extend dorsally onto the lateral surface. The tooth row is positioned along the margins of the dentary. The ventral half of the mandible has a rough texture on the lateral surface, while the dorsal half of the mandible has a smooth texture. The position of the cheeks on the lower jaws is marked by the boundary between the smooth and the textured surfaces during occlusion as it is opposite to the lateral edge of the maxillary shelf. The coronoid process is small and low, and is present towards the front of the base of the process. The predentary is subtriangular in cross-section and bears numerous nutrient foramina to serve the rhamphotheca on the dorsal surface. The left dentary preserves 15 teeth and alveoli in the left dentary and 16 in the right dentary.

== Classification ==
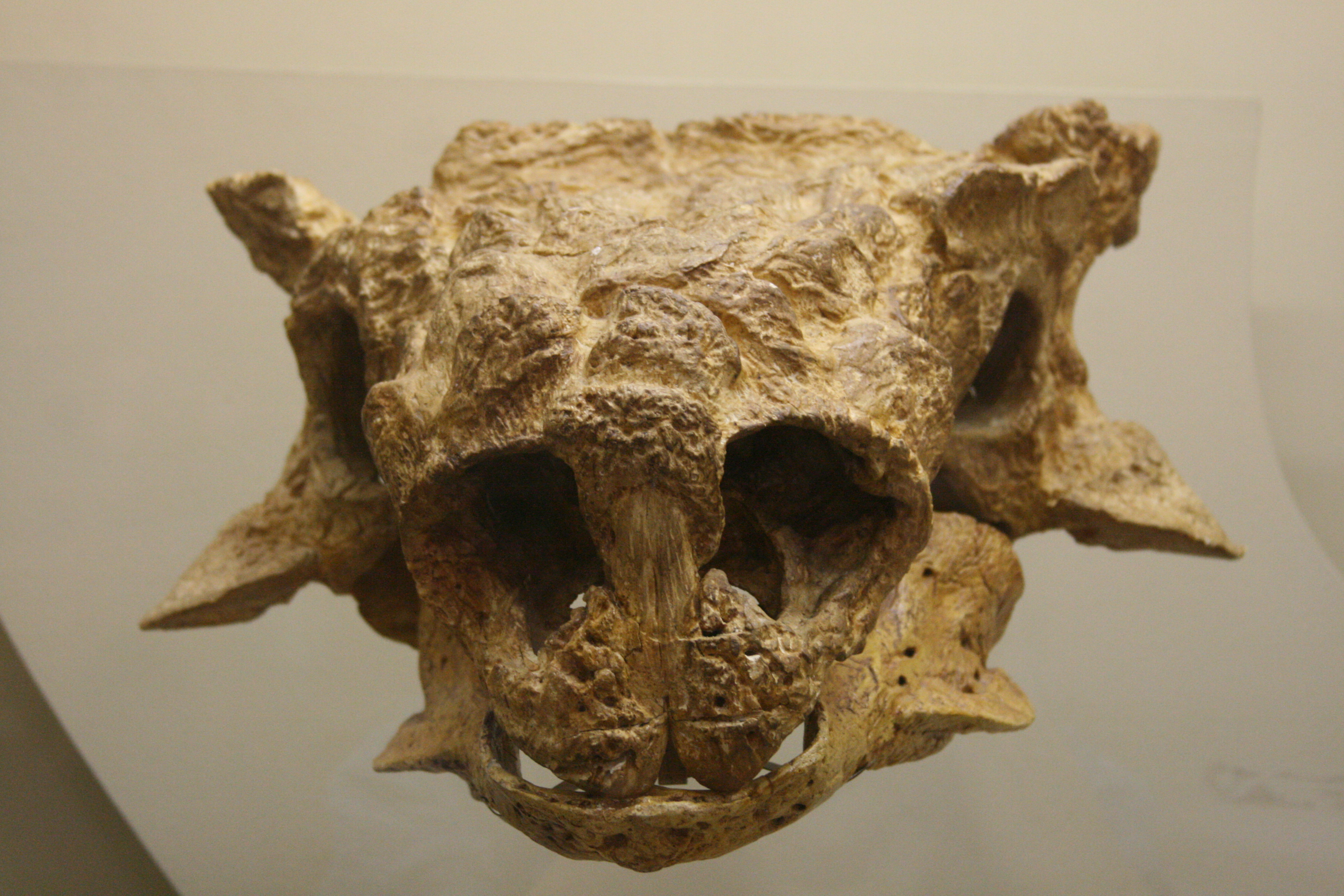
Type specimen of Tarchia teresae, a taxon closely related to Minotaurasaurus

Miles & Miles (2009) interpreted Minotaurasaurus as an ankylosaurid, but did not conduct a phylogenetic analysis. A phylogenetic analysis performed by Thomas et al. (2012) recovered it as sister taxon to Pinacosaurus grangeri, a position also recovered by Han et al. (2014). Arbour et al. (2014) considered Minotaurasaurus as a junior synonym of Tarchia kielanae due to the shared presence of a furrow near the squamosal horn, a conclusion also met by Arbour & Currie (2015). However, Penkalski & Tumanova (2016) noted that it differs from Tarchia by a number of characteristics, such as differences in the squamosal horns and caputegulae, and stated that it should therefore be considered as a valid taxon. Penkalski & Tumanova (2016) also conducted a phylogenetic analysis which found Minotaurasaurus as being at the base of a clade containing Zaraapelta, Saichania and Tarchia. Park et al. (2021) also had similar results to Penkalski & Tumanova (2016), while Wiersma & Irmis (2018) recovered it within a polytomy with Tarchia kielanae and Shanxia.

A limited phylogenetic analysis conducted Penkalski & Tumanova (2016) is reproduced below.

- - Minotaurasaurus
  - - Zaraapelta
    - - Saichania
      - - T. kielanae
        - T. teresae
  - Pinacosaurus

The results of an earlier analysis by Thompson et al. (2012) are reproduced below.

- - - Huayangosaurus taibaii
    - Stegosaurus armatus
  - - Nodosauridae
    - Ankylosauridae
      - Minmi paravertebra
      - - Liaoningosaurus paradoxus
        - - Cedarpelta bilbeyhallorum
          - - Gobisaurus domoculus
            - - Shamosaurus scutatus
              - - Zhongyuansaurus luoyangensis
                - Tsagantegia longicranialis
                - - - Shanxia tianzhensis
                    - - "Crichtonsaurus" benxiensis
                      - - Dyoplosaurus acutosquameus
                        - Pinacosaurus mephistocephalus
                  - - - Ankylosaurus magniventris
                      - Euoplocephalus tutus
                    - - - Minotaurasaurus ramachandrani
                        - Pinacosaurus grangeri
                      - - Nodocephalosaurus kirtlandensis
                        - - - Talarurus plicatospineus
                            - Tianzhenosaurus youngi
                          - - Saichania chulsanensis
                            - Tarchia gigantea

== Paleobiology ==
=== Feeding ===
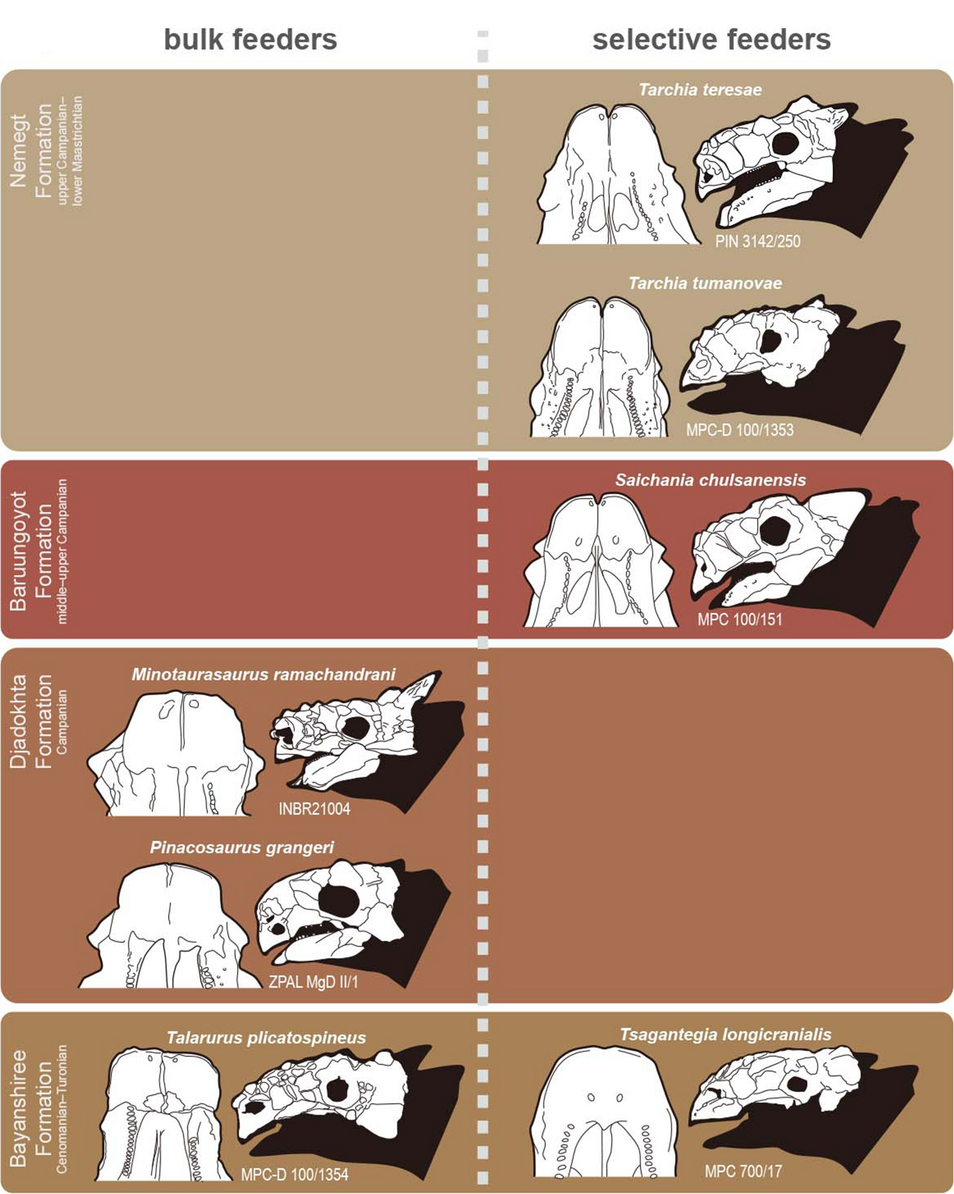
Snout morphology and diet of Mongolian ankylosaurids; M. ramachandrani in left

Minotaurasaurus was, like other Mongolian ankylosaurines, herbivorous and a low-level bulk feeder based on its sub-rectangular broad muzzle. Instead of oral processing, ankylosaurids living in dry environments such as Minotaurasaurus may have relied more on hindgut fermentation for digestion or, alternatively, consumed succulent plants that did not require complex chewing. These ankylosaurids may have also been restricted to simple orthal pulping and might have had to deal with more grit during feeding compared to ankylosaurs that lived in tropical to subtropical climates, as indicated by the microwear pits. Park et al. (2021) suggested that there was a shift from bulk feeding to selective feeding in Mongolian ankylosaurines during the Campanian and Maastrichtian stages which may have either been caused by the change in habitat, as the climate changed from semi-arid and arid to humid, or interspecific competition with saurolophine hadrosaurids that immigrated from North America to Central Asia during the Campanian stage.

The type specimen of Minotaurasaurus may have had a pair of small osteoderms below the orbits that were homologous to the posterior cheek plates of nodosaurids such as Panoplosaurus and Edmontonia. The presence of these osteoderms at the level of the last three maxillary teeth suggests that either the bucca did not extend as anteriorly as in Panoplosaurus and Edmontonia or an anteriorly extended bucca was present but did not embed extensive cheek plates.

== Paleoenvironment ==
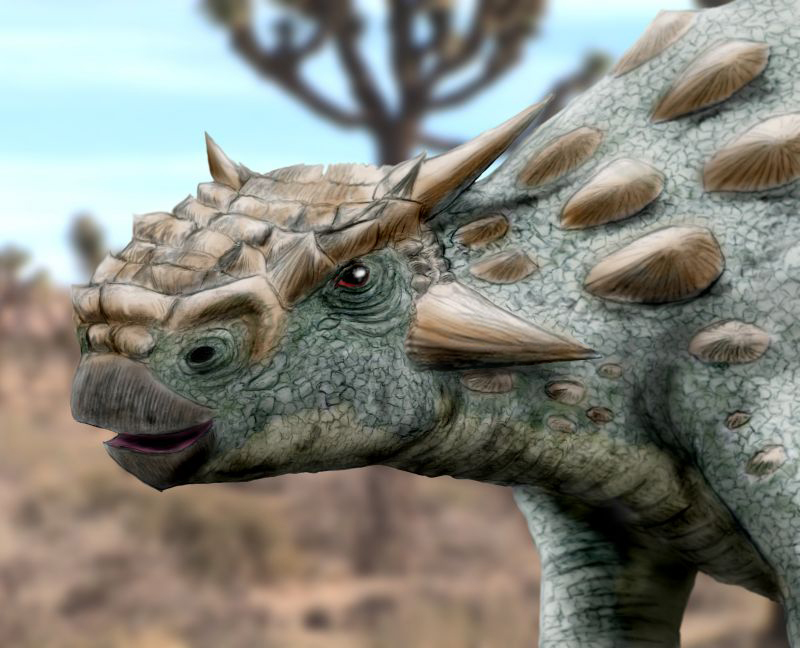
Restoration of Minotaurasaurus in paleoenvironment

The remains of Minotaurasaurus were likely recovered from the Ukhaa Tolgod locality at the Djadochta Formation. The formation is divided into two members, the lower Bayn Dzak Member and the upper Turgrugyin Member. The Bayn Dzak Member consists of moderate reddish orange, crossbedded, and structureless sandstones, with subordinate deposits of brown siltstone and mudstone. The mudstone and siltstone represents an interdune facies deposited by fluvial action, while the crossbedded and structureless sandstones represent eolian dunes and fluvial deposits or sandslides that occurred on the dune faces. The Turgrugyin Member consists of very pale orange to light gray sands, which also represents a crossbedded dune facies and a structureless sandslide facies. Magnetostratigraphic datings from the Bayn Dzak and Tugriken Shireh localities suggest that the formation dates to the late Campanian stage of the Late Cretaceous, ca. ~75-71 Ma. Based on the strata, rock facies, sedimentation and coeval units, the Djadochta Formation represents an arid environment consisting of sand dunes and short-lived water bodies with a warm, semiarid climate.

Specimens of Minotaurasaurus likely originated from the lower Bayn Dzak Member of the Djadochta Formation, which have also yielded specimens of the dromaeosaurids Velociraptor mongoliensis and Tsaagan; the halszkaraptorine Halszkaraptor; the troodontids Byronosaurus and Saurornithoides; the oviraptorids Citipati, Oviraptor and Khaan; the alvarezsaurid Shuvuuia; the ankylosaurid Pinacosaurus grangeri; the ceratopsian Protoceratops; an indeterminate hadrosauroid; and an indeterminate azhdarchid. The upper Turgrugyin Member has yielded the dromaeosaurid Velociraptor mongoliensis; the halszkaraptorine Mahakala; the ornithomimosaurs Aepyornithomimus and an indeterminate ornithomimosaur; the oviraptorosaur Avimimus; the ceratopsians Protoceratops and Udanoceratops; and an indeterminate tyrannosaurid.

== See also ==
- Timeline of ankylosaur research
