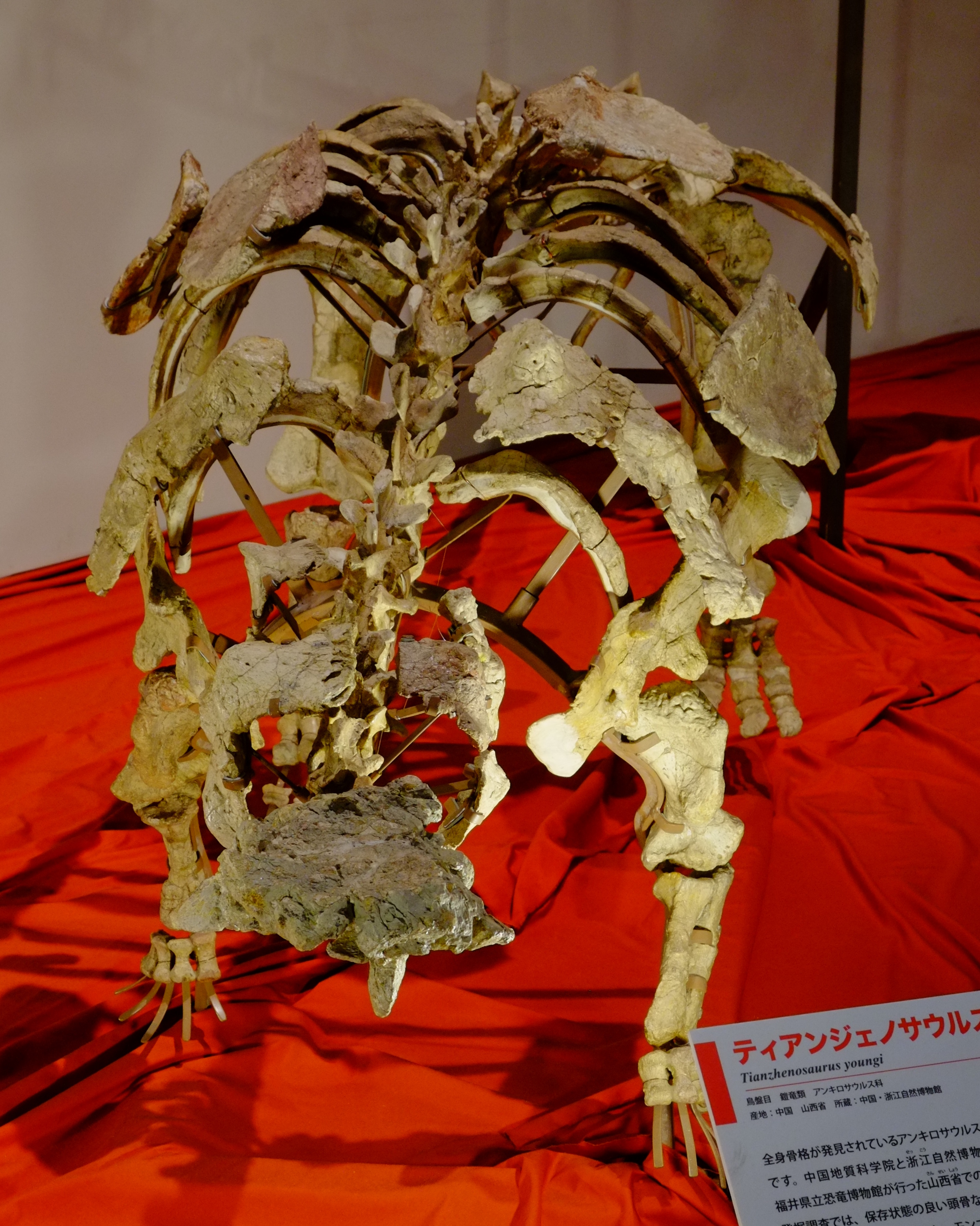
- Reconstructed skeleton of T. youngi

Scientific classification
- Kingdom: Animalia
- Phylum: Chordata
- Class: Reptilia
- Clade: Dinosauria
- Clade: †Ornithischia
- Clade: †Thyreophora
- Clade: †Ankylosauria
- Family: †Ankylosauridae
- Subfamily: †Ankylosaurinae
- Genus: †Tianzhenosaurus; Pang & Cheng, 1998

Type species
- Tianzhenosaurus youngi Pang & Cheng, 1998

Species
- Tianzhenosaurus chengi Pang, Li & Guo, 2024; Tianzhenosaurus youngi Pang & Cheng, 1998

Synonyms
- Shanxia? Barrett et al., 1998

= Tianzhenosaurus =

Tianzhenosaurus Temporal range: Late Cretaceous, 99–71 Ma

Extinct genus of dinosaurs

Tianzhenosaurus (meaning “Tianzhen lizard”) is a genus of ankylosaurid dinosaurs known from the Late Cretaceous Huiquanpu Formation of Shanxi Province, China. The genus contains two species, T. youngi (the type species) and T. chengi. Some researchers have suggested that Tianzhenosaurus may represent a junior synonym of Saichania, an ankylosaurine from the Barun Goyot and Nemegt formations.

== Discovery and naming ==
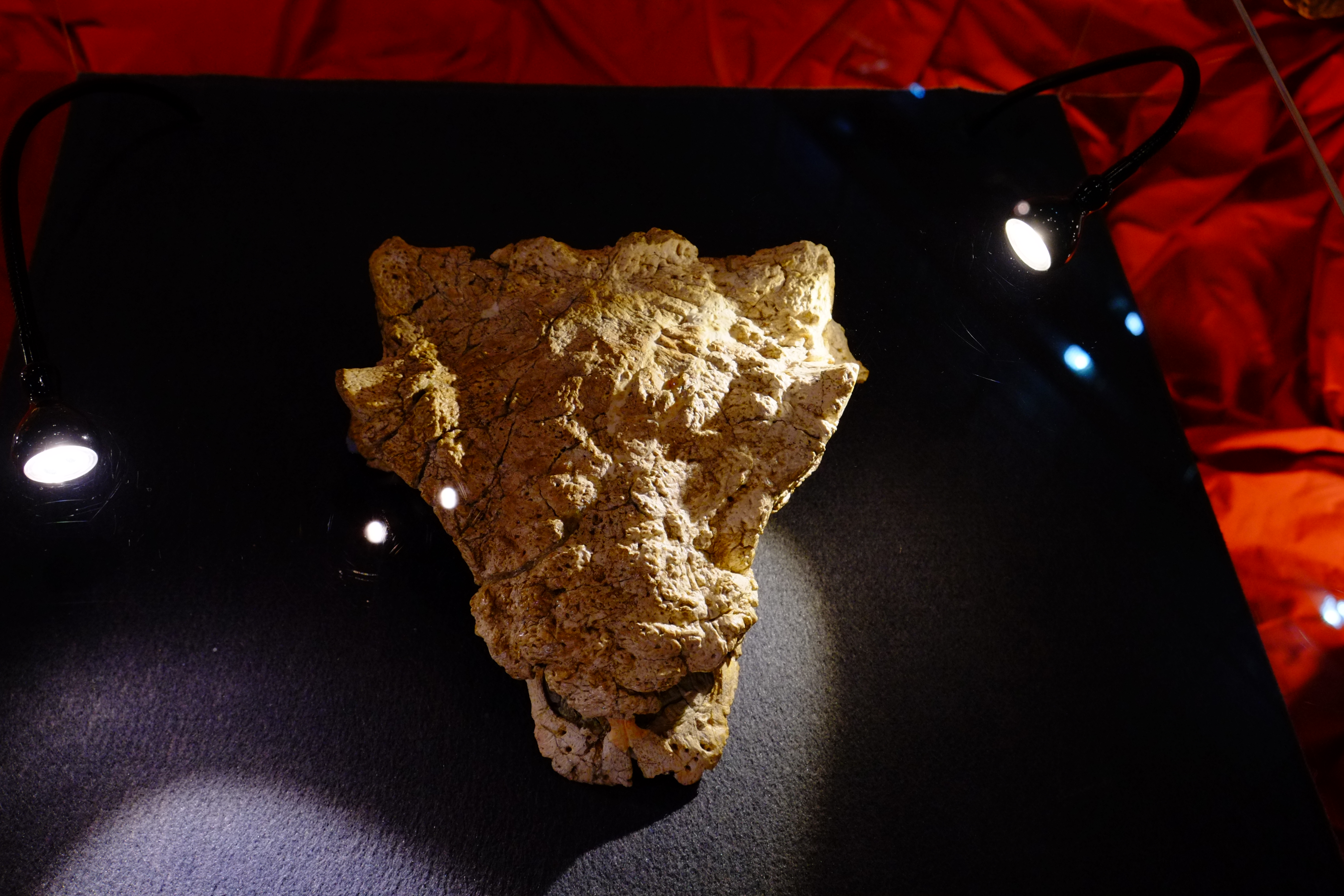
Holotype skull of T. youngi

In 1983, Pang Qiqing and Cheng Zhengwu discovered articulated cervical vertebrae of an ankylosaurid from the Shanxi Province. Numerous excavations at the site yielded more than 2,300 specimens belonging to sauropods, theropods, ornithopods and ankylosaurid specimens. The holotype specimen of Tianzhenosaurus youngi, HBV-10001, consists of a partial skull. Two paratype specimens were assigned to this species: HBV-10002 (an incomplete mandible and HBV-10003 (cervical vertebrae, dorsal vertebrae, caudal vertebrae, a sacral complex, ilia, pectoral girdles, pelvic girdles, fore and hind limbs with fore and hind feet, tail club and osteoderms) The holotype and paratype specimens were collected from the Huiquanpu Formation and are housed at the Geoscience Museum, Hebei GEO University, Shijiazhuang.

The generic name, Tianzhenosaurus, is derived from the Tianzhen County and the Greek word "sauros" (lizard). The specific name, youngi, honors Professor Yang Zhongjian ("C. C. Young"), a major contributor to the success of vertebrate paleontology in China.

In 1999, Sullivan considered Tianzhenosaurus as a junior synonym of Saichania based on the skulls being similar in overall morphology. Additionally, Sullivan also considered Shanxia as a junior synonym of Tianzhenosaurus as the only diagnosable characteristic of Shanxia is known to be variable within a single taxon such as Euoplocephalus. Arbour & Currie (2015) also reaffirmed Tianzhenosaurus as a junior synonym of Saichania based on similar reasons provided by Sullivan (1999), but noted that if the humerus of Tianzhenosaurus is later shown to differ from that of Saichania, then it could be considered as a distinct taxon.

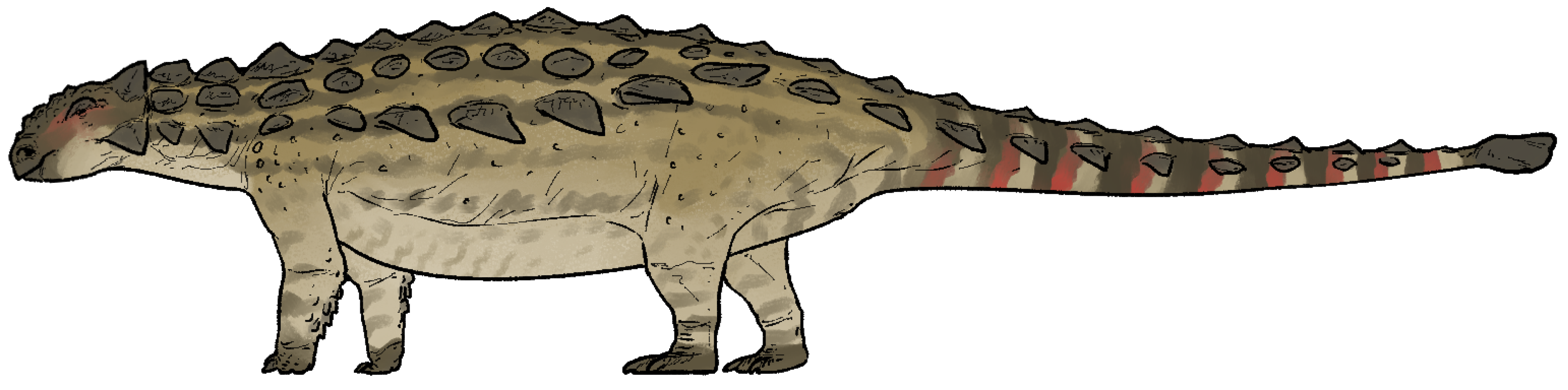
Life reconstruction of T. chengi

In 2024, Pang, Li & Guo described Tianzhenosaurus chengi as a new species in the genus based on the holotype, HBV-10004 (a skull), and paratype HBV-10005 (a nearly complete skeleton). The specific name honors Chinese paleontologist Cheng Zhengwu and his work in Shanxi. They noted several cranial characteristics that could be used to distinguish Tianzhenosaurus from other Asian ankylosaurids, including Saichania, Talarurus, and Shanxia. The specimen was found in the same rock layers as T. youngi.

== Description ==
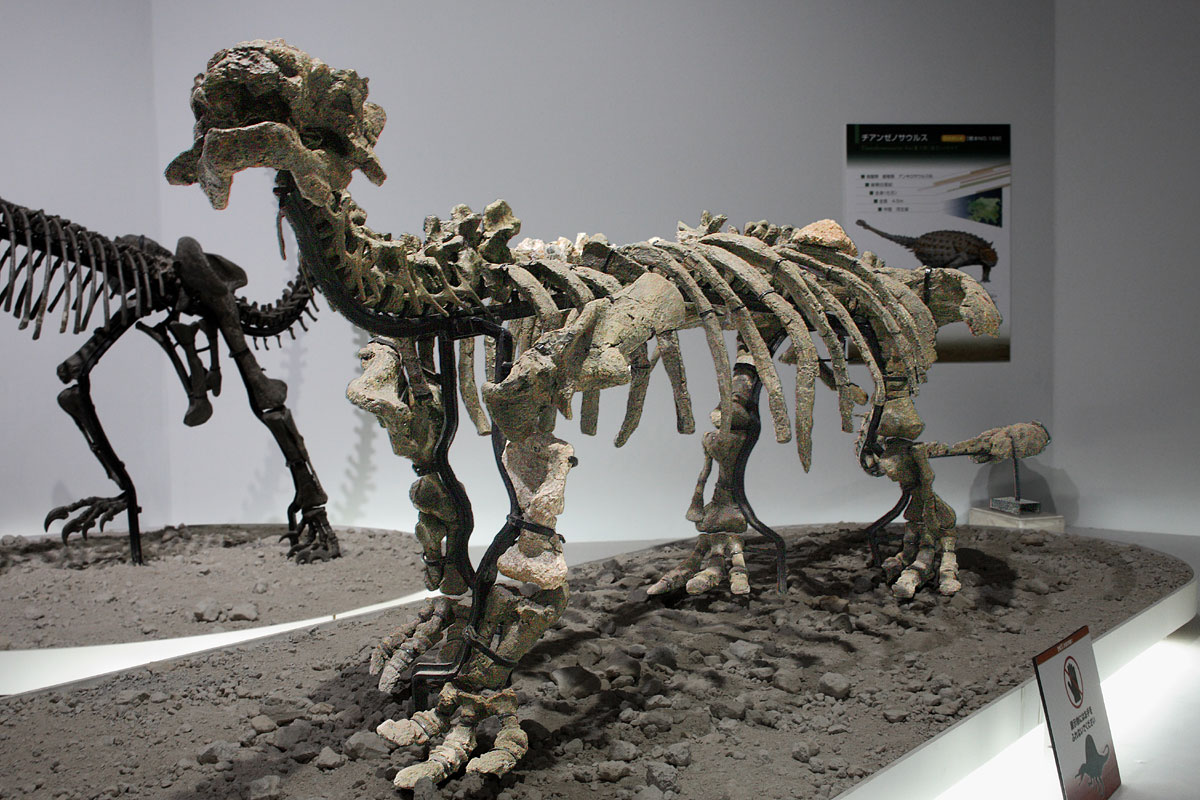
Reconstructed skeleton mount of T. youngi

Pang and Cheng, 1998 distinguished Tianzhenosaurus from all other ankylosaurids based on the following traits: A flat, low, medium-sized, isosceles triangle shaped skull; skull roof covered with irregular bony tubercles; a relatively long premaxilla; a small orbit surrounded by a bony ring; horizontally elongates narial openings; septomaxilla not separating the narial openings; maxillary tooth rows slightly convergent posteriorly; short basicranium; maxilloturbinal located laterally in middle part of the palatal vault; vertical occipital region; narrow and high occipital condyle; occipital condyle not visible in dorsal view; opisthotic extends lateroventrally as a curved process; mandible is deep with a convex ventral border; no mandibular ornamentation; tooth crowns have cingula on labial sides, swollen bases, and middle ridge on lingual sides; short, amphicoelous cervical centrum; dorsal centrum is long and flat at both ends; eight fused vertebrae in sacrum; short and thick anterior caudal vertebrae; narrow and elongated posterior caudal vertebrae that ended with a tail club; rectangular, plate-like scapula; proximal and distal ends of humerus are moderately expanded and not twisted; thick femur lacking the fourth trochanter; tarsometatarsal and digits that are typical for ankylosaurs.

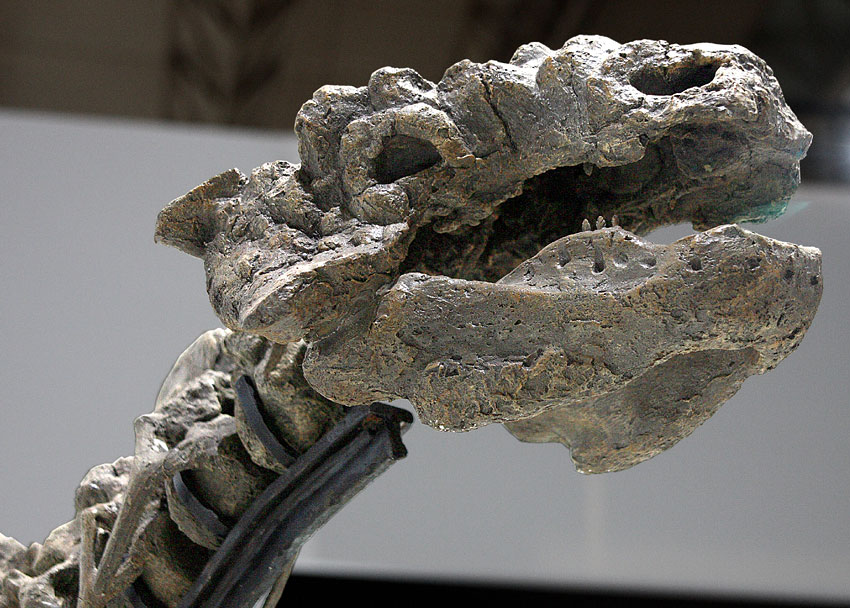
Reconstructed skull of T. youngi

Pang & Cheng (1998) noted that the overall skull morphology of Tianzhenosaurus was similar to that of Saichania as both taxa have an isosceles triangle shaped skull, a similar location of the orbit at the mid-posterior part of the skull, occipital condyle that do not extend beyond the posterior edge of the skull roof, and the skull roof being covered with dermal plates and bony nobs. However, Pang & Cheng also noted that Tianzhenosaurus also shared similarities to Ankylosaurus as they both have triangular shaped skulls, irregular dermal scutes covering the skull roof, posteriorly diverging maxillary tooth rows, transversely widened occipital condyle, and horizontal extension of the opisthotic and having no ventral curvature.

== Classification ==
Pang & Cheng (1998) originally placed Tianzhenosaurus into Ankylosauridae, but did not specify it's relationship with other ankylosaurids. Both Sullivan (1999) and Arbour & Currie (2015) considered Tianzhenosaurus as a junior synonym of Saichania based on the overall similar morphology of the skulls. Vickaryous et al. (2004) classified Tianzhenosaurus as an ankylosaurine, sister taxon to Pinacosaurus mephistocephalus, while Thompson et al. (2012) recovered Tianzhenosaurus as sister taxon to Talarurus. However, Wiersma and Irmis (2018) recovered Tianzhenosaurus as a valid taxon and interpreted it as sister taxon to Pinacosaurus grangeri.

A phylogenetic analysis conducted by Thompson et al., 2012 is reproduced below.

- - - Huayangosaurus taibaii
    - Stegosaurus armatus
  - - Nodosauridae
    - Ankylosauridae
      - Minmi paravertebra
      - - Liaoningosaurus paradoxus
        - - Cedarpelta bilbeyhallorum
          - - Gobisaurus domoculus
            - - Shamosaurus scutatus
              - - Zhongyuansaurus luoyangensis
                - Tsagantegia longicranialis
                - - - Shanxia tianzhensis
                    - - "Crichtonsaurus" benxiensis
                      - - Dyoplosaurus acutosquameus
                        - Pinacosaurus mephistocephalus
                  - - - Ankylosaurus magniventris
                      - Euoplocephalus tutus
                    - - - Minotaurasaurus ramachandrani
                        - Pinacosaurus grangeri
                      - - Nodocephalosaurus kirtlandensis
                        - - - Talarurus plicatospineus
                            - Tianzhenosaurus youngi
                          - - Saichania chulsanensis
                            - Tarchia gigantea

The results of an earlier analysis by Vickaryous et al., 2004 is reproduced below.

- Ankylosauria
  - - Cedarpelta bilbeyhallorum
    - Nodosauridae
  - - Gargoyleosaurus parkpinorum
    - - Minmi paravertebra
      - - Gastonia burgei
        - Ankylosauridae
          - - Gobisaurus domoculus
            - Shamosaurus scutatus
          - - Tsagantegia longicranialis
            - - Tarchia gigantea
              - - - Ankylosaurus magniventris
                  - Euoplocephalus tutus
                - - Saichania chulsanensis
                  - Talarurus plicatospineus
                  - - Pinacosaurus grangeri
                    - - Pinacosaurus mephistocephalus
                      - Tianzhenosaurus youngi

== Paleoenvironment ==
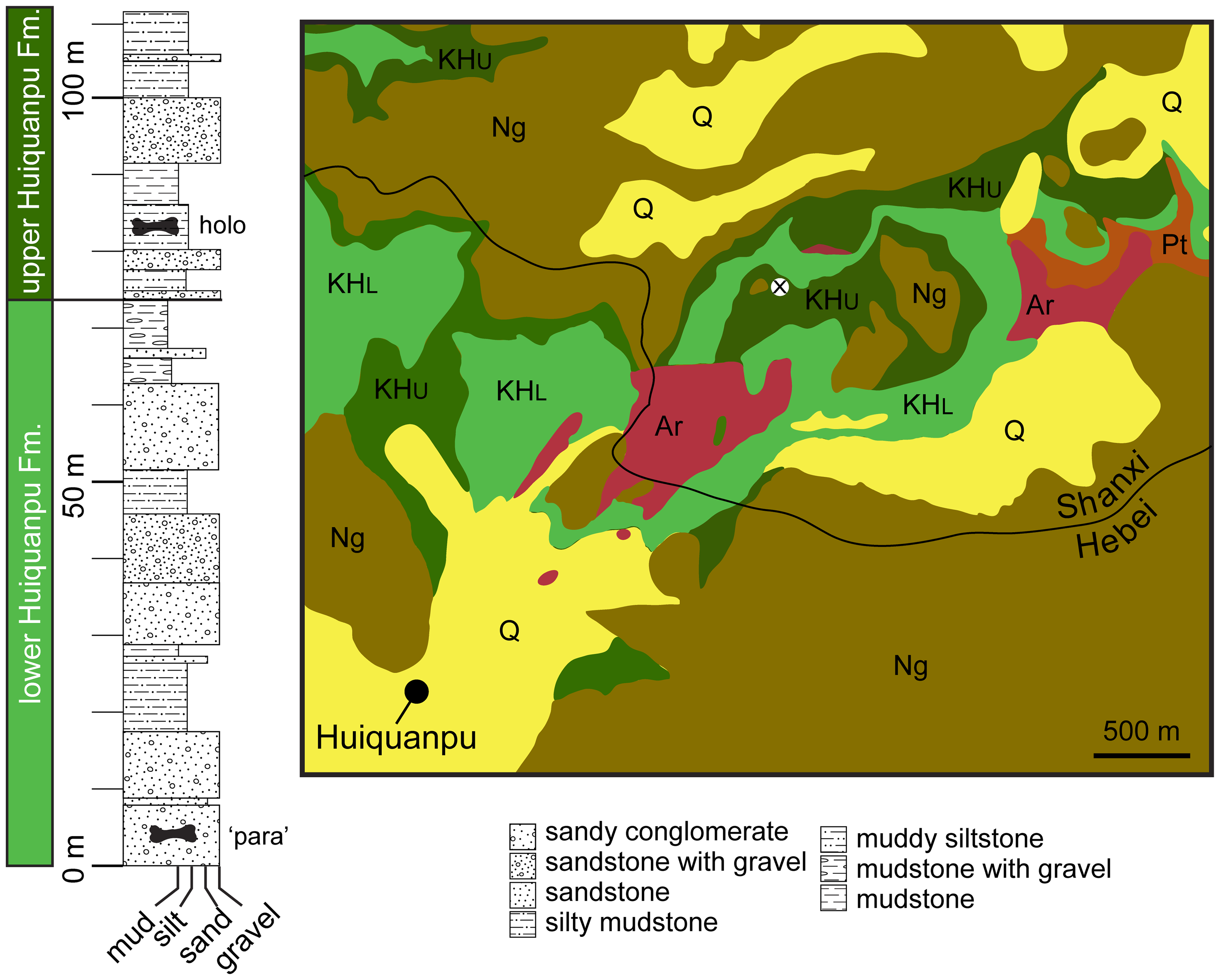
Stratigraphic map of the Huiquanpu Formation

The holotype specimen of Tianzhenosaurus was recovered from the Huiquanpu Formation, which possibly dates to the Cenomanian or Campanian stage of the Late Cretaceous. However, the precise dating of the formation is problematic due to the absence of index fossils and the Cretaceous age is partially based on the discovery of indeterminate pliosaur material. The Huiquanpu Formation consists of grey siltstones interbedded with red medium to coarse grained sandstones that has extensive cross-bedding. Based on the sedimentation, the formation represents a fluvial environment, with the upper part of the formation being extensively reworked by a number of early Tertiary volcanic intrusions.

Tianzhenosaurus would have coexisted with the macronarian sauropod Huabeisaurus, the hadrosauroid ornithopod Datonglong, the pantyrannosaurian tyrannosauroid Jinbeisaurus and the ankylosaurine ankylosaurid Shanxia, which may represent a junior synonym of Tianzhenosaurus.

== See also ==
- Timeline of ankylosaur research
