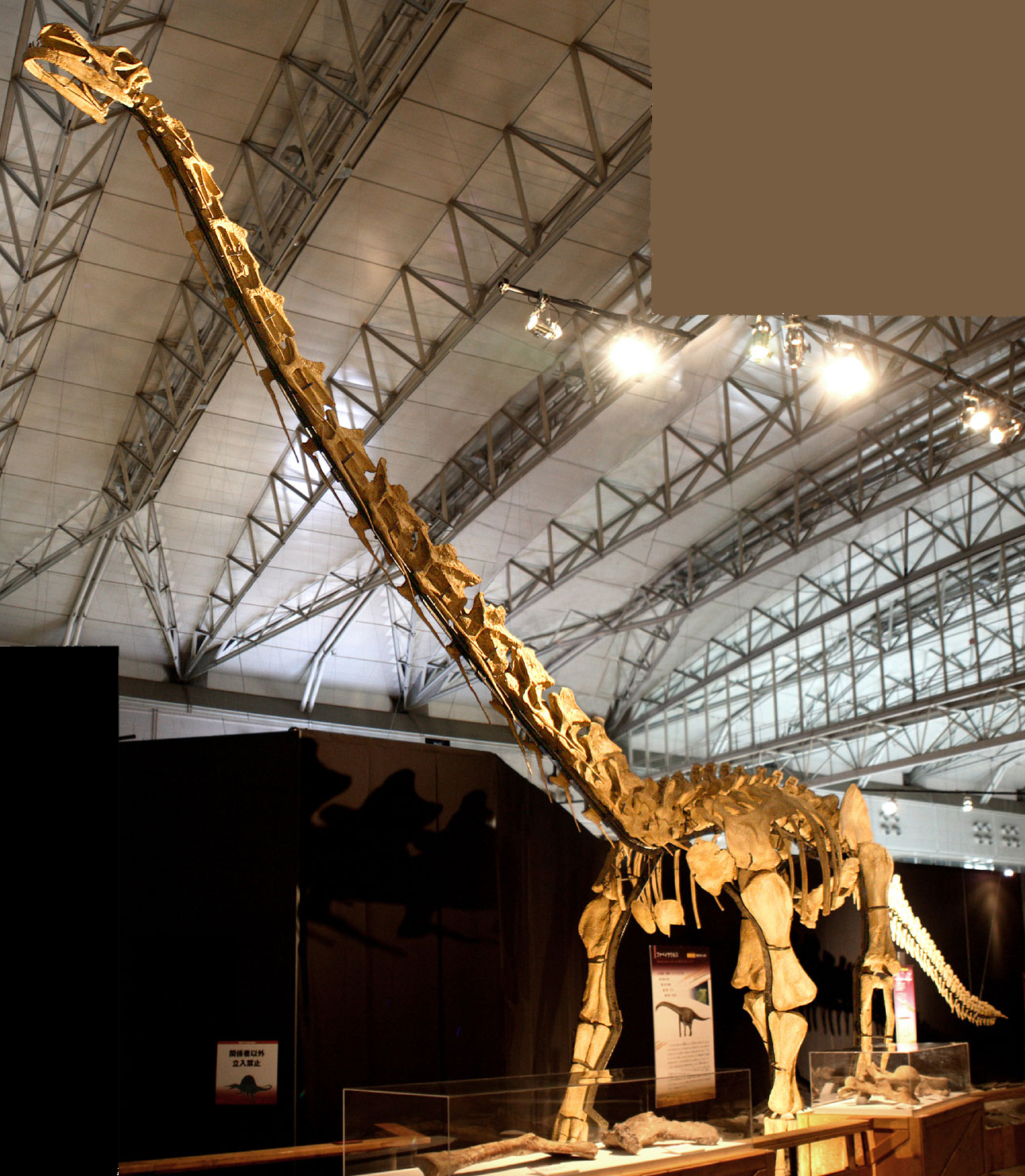
- Mounted skeleton in Japan

Scientific classification
- Kingdom: Animalia
- Phylum: Chordata
- Class: Reptilia
- Clade: Dinosauria
- Clade: Saurischia
- Clade: †Sauropodomorpha
- Clade: †Sauropoda
- Clade: †Macronaria
- Family: †Euhelopodidae
- Genus: †Huabeisaurus; Pang & Cheng, 2000

Type species
- †Huabeisaurus allocotus Pang & Cheng, 2000

= Huabeisaurus =

Huabeisaurus Temporal range: Late Cretaceous, 95–72 Ma

Extinct genus of dinosaurs

Huabeisaurus (/ˌhwɑːbeɪˈsɔːrəs/, meaning "North China lizard") was a genus of sauropod dinosaur from the Late Cretaceous (Cenomanian to Maastrichtian stages, around 99.7–70.6 million years ago) of what is present-day northern China. The type species, Huabeisaurus allocotus, was first described by Pang Qiqing and Cheng Zhengwu in 2000. It is known from numerous remains found in the 1990s, which include teeth, partial limbs and vertebrae. Due to its relative completeness, Huabeisaurus represents a significant taxon for understanding sauropod evolution in Asia. Huabeisaurus comes from Kangdailiang and Houyu, Zhaojiagou Town, Tianzhen County, Shanxi province, China. The holotype was found in the unnamed upper member of the Huiquanpu Formation, which is Late Cretaceous (?Cenomanian–?Campanian) in age based on ostracods, charophytes, and fission-track dating.

Huabeisaurus measures 20 metres (66 ft) long and 5 metres (16 ft) high, as estimated by Pang and Cheng in 2000. It would have been a quadrupedal herbivore with a long neck and tail, like most other sauropods. The skeleton has been presumed to have belonged to an almost mature individual, because it lacks sutures on vertebrae, but not on pelvic material. A set of 12 characters were identified by D'Emic et al. in 2013 that differentiate Huabeisaurus from other sauropods. An isolated humerus, designated the paratype by Pang and Cheng, comes from a locality over 200 metres (660 ft) away from the type locality of Huabeisaurus, in a fluvially deposited sandy conglomeratic layer in the lower member of the Huiquanpu Formation. This layer is roughly 90 metres (300 ft) lower stratigraphically than the type horizon of Huabeisaurus, which comes from the upper member of the Huiquanpu Formation. The humerus thus comes from a stratum representing a different and likely older depositional environment than that of Huabeisaurus, and does not overlap anatomically with the holotypic skeleton, and so cannot currently be referred it.

The discoverers erected a new family for the genus, Huabeisauridae, although this family name is not widely used amongst paleontologists. Recently, the family was again proposed, this time by D'Emic et al. because Euhelopodidae, which Huabeisaurus has been assigned to most recently, might have to be split into smaller clades throughout Somphospondyli because of all the taxa assigned to it. Pang and Cheng tentatively suggested that "Titanosaurus" falloti be referred to Huabeisaurus. One problem, however, is that the femora of Huabeisaurus and "T." falloti differ in the bevel of the distal end versus the long axis of the bone, so the two cannot represent the same genus.

== Description ==
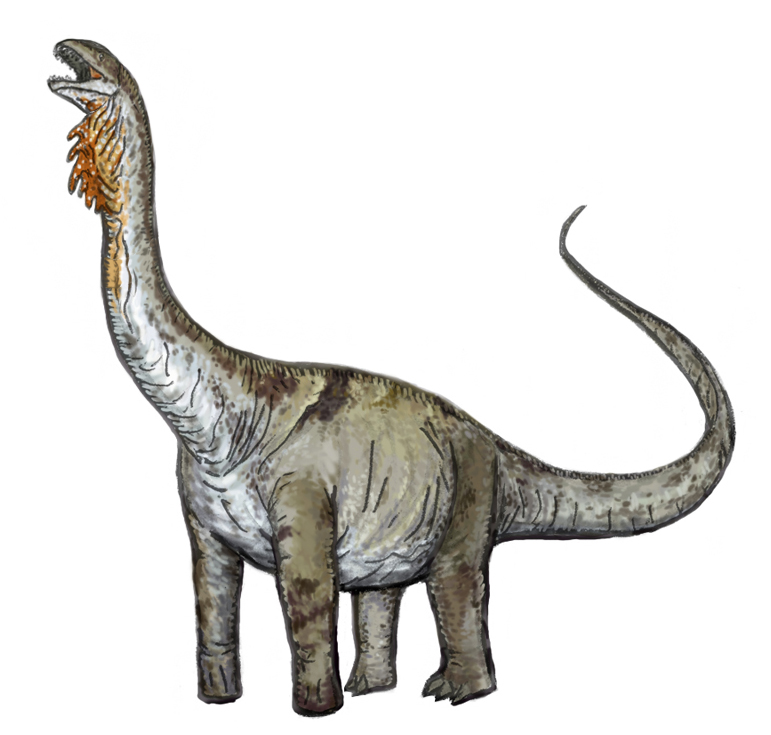
Restoration

The Late Cretaceous titanosauriform sauropod Huabeisaurus is known from teeth and much of the postcranial skeleton. Its completeness makes it an important taxon for integrating and interpreting anatomical observations from more fragmentary Cretaceous East Asian sauropods and for understanding titanosauriform evolution in general.

Measuring 20 metres (66 ft) in total length, Huabeisaurus is large when compared to most dinosaurs, but by sauropod standards, it was only midsized. It had a hip height of 5 metres (16 ft). Like other sauropods, it would have been a quadrupedal herbivore with a long neck and tail.

The skeleton has been presumed to have belonged to an almost mature individual. The absence of sutures between the neural arches and centra of cervical, dorsal, and caudal vertebrae suggests that the specimen was nearing sexual maturity, but the open sutures between the scapula and coracoid, and the ilium and some sacral ribs suggest that it had not reached full maturity.

== Discovery and naming ==
The sauropod Huabeisaurus was excavated from Upper Cretaceous sediments of the province of Shanxi, in northeast China. The skeleton was recovered in the 1990s. The holotype of Huabeisaurus is a partially articulated individual composed of teeth, cervical, dorsal, sacral, and caudal vertebrae, ribs, complete pectoral and pelvic girdles, and nearly complete limbs. Due to its relative completeness, Huabeisaurus represents a significant taxon for understanding sauropod evolution in Asia.

=== Material ===
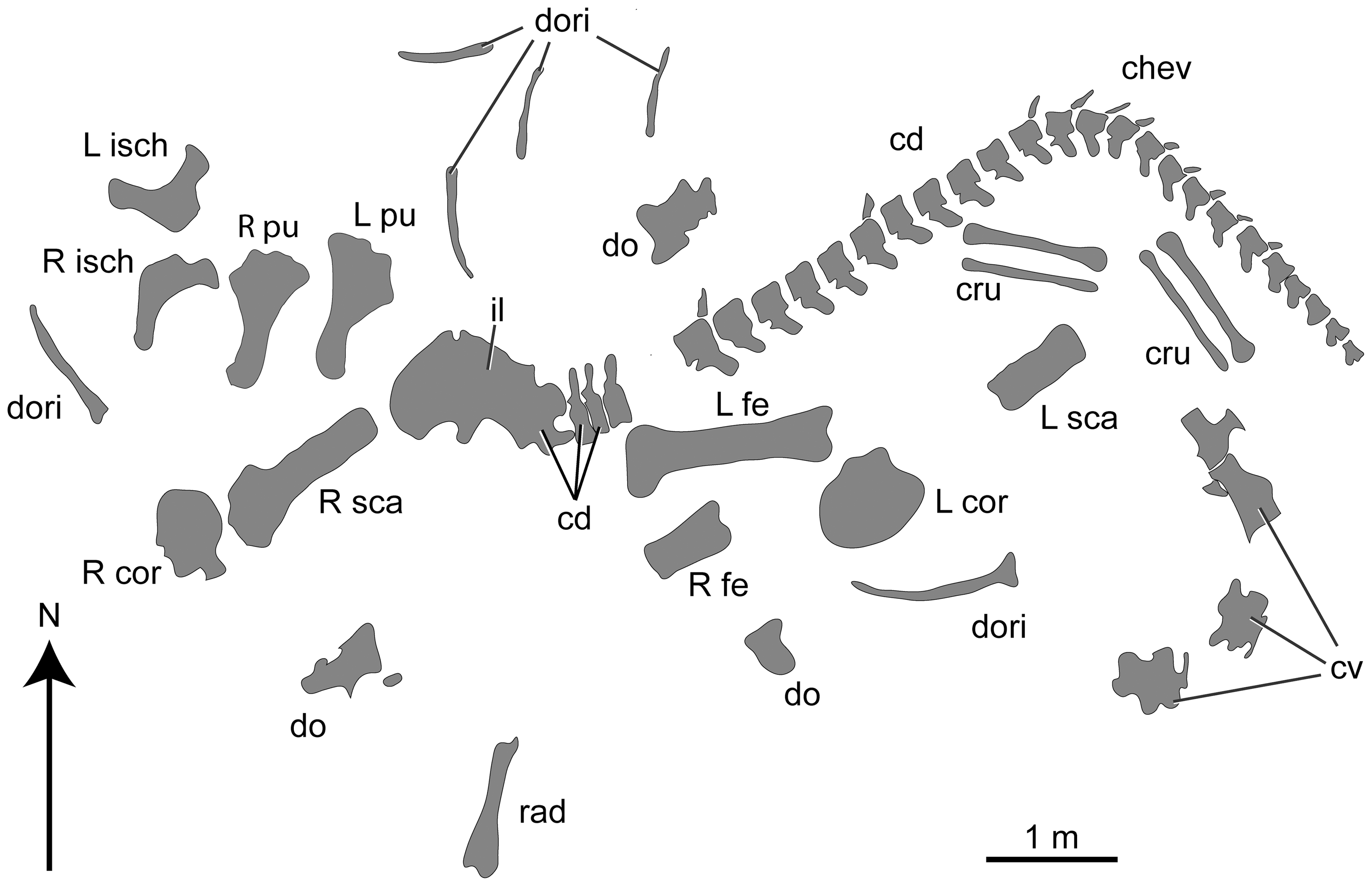
Image of the skeleton in the position when it was found

Limb and girdle elements from the left and right sides of the body closely match each other in size and are the appropriate size to belong to the same individual as the vertebrae and ribs. The disposition of bones in the quarry is approximately as expected if the animal were lying on its left side in an opisthotonic pose, but nearly all bones show some disorientation and disarticulation: the cervical vertebrae are arranged along a curved line, and extending along this tight curve (approximately) sit two of the dorsal vertebrae followed by the sacrum and caudal vertebrae. The sacrum and first three caudal vertebrae were found in articulation and in line with the remaining articulated caudal vertebrae; others are present after a gap of about 0.5 metres (1.6 ft). Twenty-seven caudal vertebrae are shown on the quarry map, but 30 were found in the collection, and pre-restoration photos indicate that 32 were originally present. Many of the chevrons were found articulated with their respective caudal vertebrae. The left and right scapulae were recovered on the left and right sides of the body, respectively. The left radius was found about midway between the pectoral girdle elements. Left and right femora, pubes, and ilia were located close to one another and all of these were found near the sacrum. The sacrum is depicted with its left side facing upwards on the quarry map, but this might have been an error because the left side of the sacrum is damaged and the left ilium is missing. The elements of the left and right crura were found in close association. Dorsal rib fragments were scattered across the quarry area. In sum, some degree of dispositioning occurred to HBV-20001 before or during burial, resulting in loss and disarticulation of some elements, but the disposition, overall agreement in size, and lack of duplication of bones suggests the presence of a single sauropod individual at this locality.

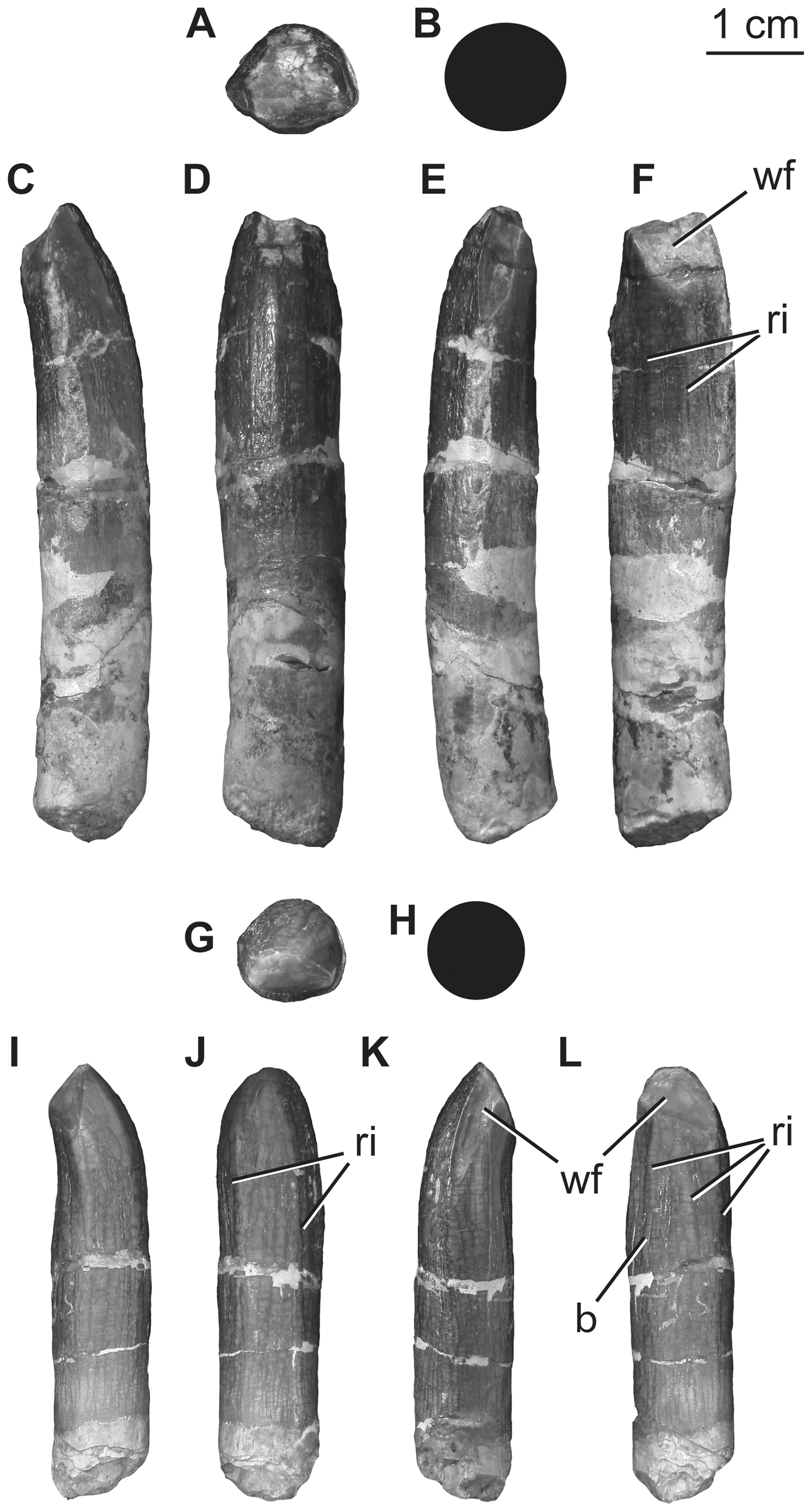
Multiple views of the two assigned teeth

Two teeth were preserved. One tooth was discovered in the quarry during excavation and a second was found as field jackets were opened during preparation of the specimen at Shijiazhuang University. The teeth are attributed to the holotype individual based on their close association with other bones and lack of evidence for transport from another site. Both teeth are well preserved, exhibiting wrinkled enamel. The crowns are subcylindrical, with slenderness indices of 3.46 and 3.36, which is slightly more slender than originally described by Pang and Cheng and intermediate in slenderness between broad and narrow-crowned sauropods (e.g., Euhelopus and Phuwiangosaurus). Neither tooth is strongly twisted along its length as in the upper teeth of brachiosaurids.

A total of four cervical vertebrae were recovered from the holotypic quarry. Two of these are fragmentary, whereas the other two vertebrae are nearly complete. According to the quarry map, the two poorly preserved cervical vertebrae were articulated when found and belong to a more anterior part of the cervical series than the nearly complete vertebrae. Little anatomical information can be gleaned from the two fragmentary cervical vertebrae aside from some measurements.

Only the capitula, tubercula, and part of the anterior and posterior processes of the cervical ribs are preserved. The ribs are fused to their respective vertebrae. The cervical ribs are pendant, extending ventrally for a distance subequal to the height of the centrum, as in several other East Asian Cretaceous sauropods. In both cervical vertebrae, the tuberculum is notably slender anteroposteriorly, especially in comparison with the capitulum. The cervical ribs are currently broken, but the original description notes that at least some originally exceeded centrum length.

Parts of six dorsal vertebrae are preserved: one partial anterior dorsal vertebral neural arch, one partial dorsal vertebral centrum, three posterior dorsal vertebrae that are nearly complete but currently heavily reconstructed with plaster, and one that has been plastered into the sacrum. None of the dorsal vertebrae have observable neurocentral sutures.

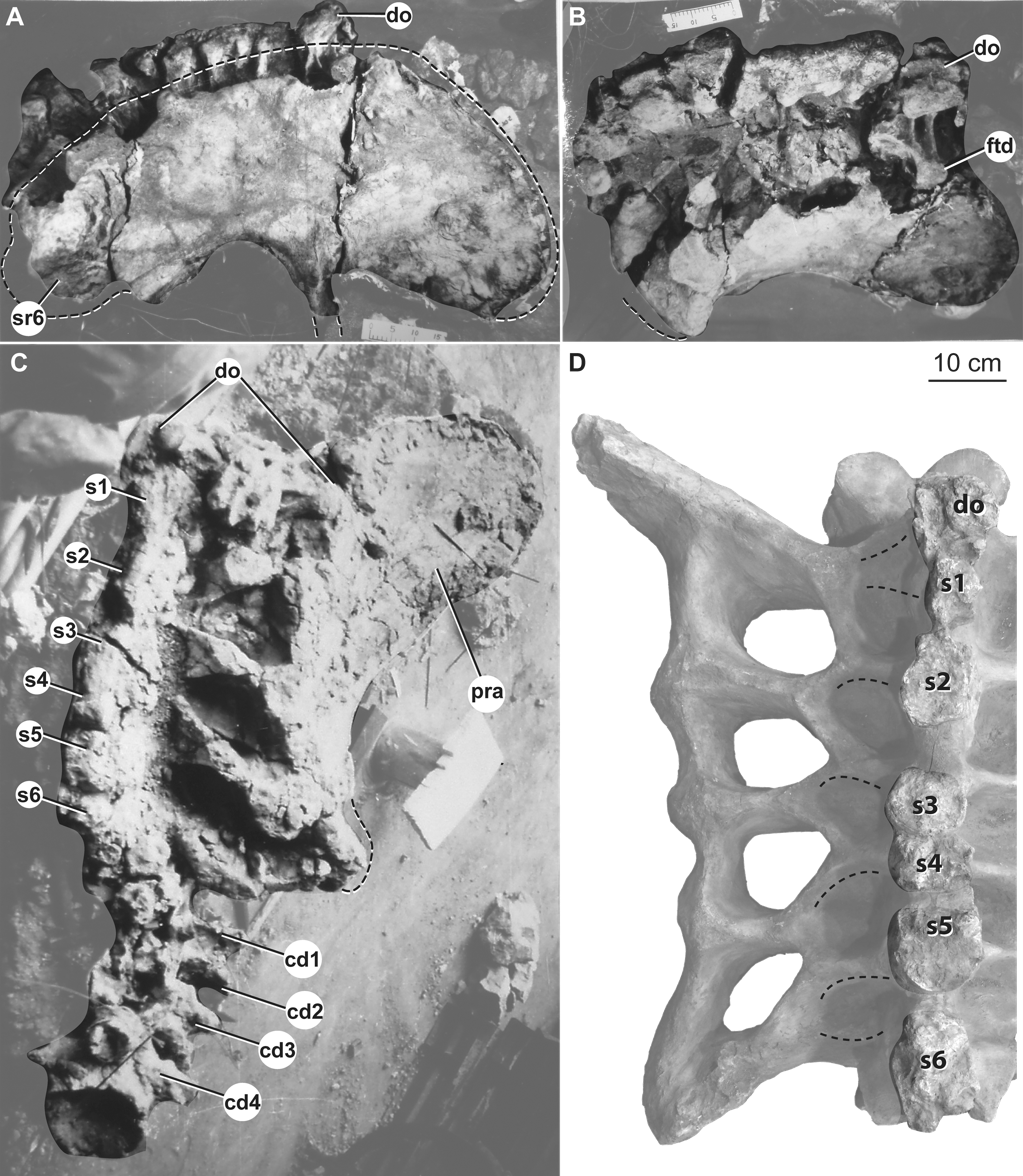
Sacrum

A nearly complete sacrum consisting of six vertebrae was recovered from the quarry, originally only lacking some ribs. The original description of Huabeisaurus suggested that only five sacral vertebrae were present based on the number of sacral ribs and intercostal foramina. The sacrum is currently heavily restored with plaster, but pre-restoration photographs show the sacrum in two oblique dorsal views and right lateral view. These photographs reveal that the last dorsal vertebra was taphonomically shifted posteriorly and to the right, crushing the right first sacral rib. Pre-restoration photographs and the number of broken sacral neural spines currently visible indicate that the sacrum was composed of at least six vertebrae. The first vertebra crushed into the sacrum could represent a seventh sacral vertebra; because the ribs of this dorsal vertebra are not observable firsthand or in photographs, but it cannot be verified whether or not these ribs contacted the ilium. The vertebra was interpreted as the last dorsal vertebra because: its neural spine does not appear to be fused to the neural spine posterior to it, and the usual sacral vertebral count for all but the most basal somphospondylans is six (with seven vertebrae in Neuquensaurus as the only derived exception).

Eleven chevrons were listed in the holotype of Huabeisaurus by Pang and Cheng, but thirteen are visible in pre-reconstruction photographs, and twelve are currently present in the Museum of Shijiazhuang University. These elements correspond to positions covering nearly the entire length of the preserved caudal vertebral series. The chevrons are generally well preserved, but there is some distortion and damage. The correspondence of chevrons to particular caudal vertebrae is uncertain.

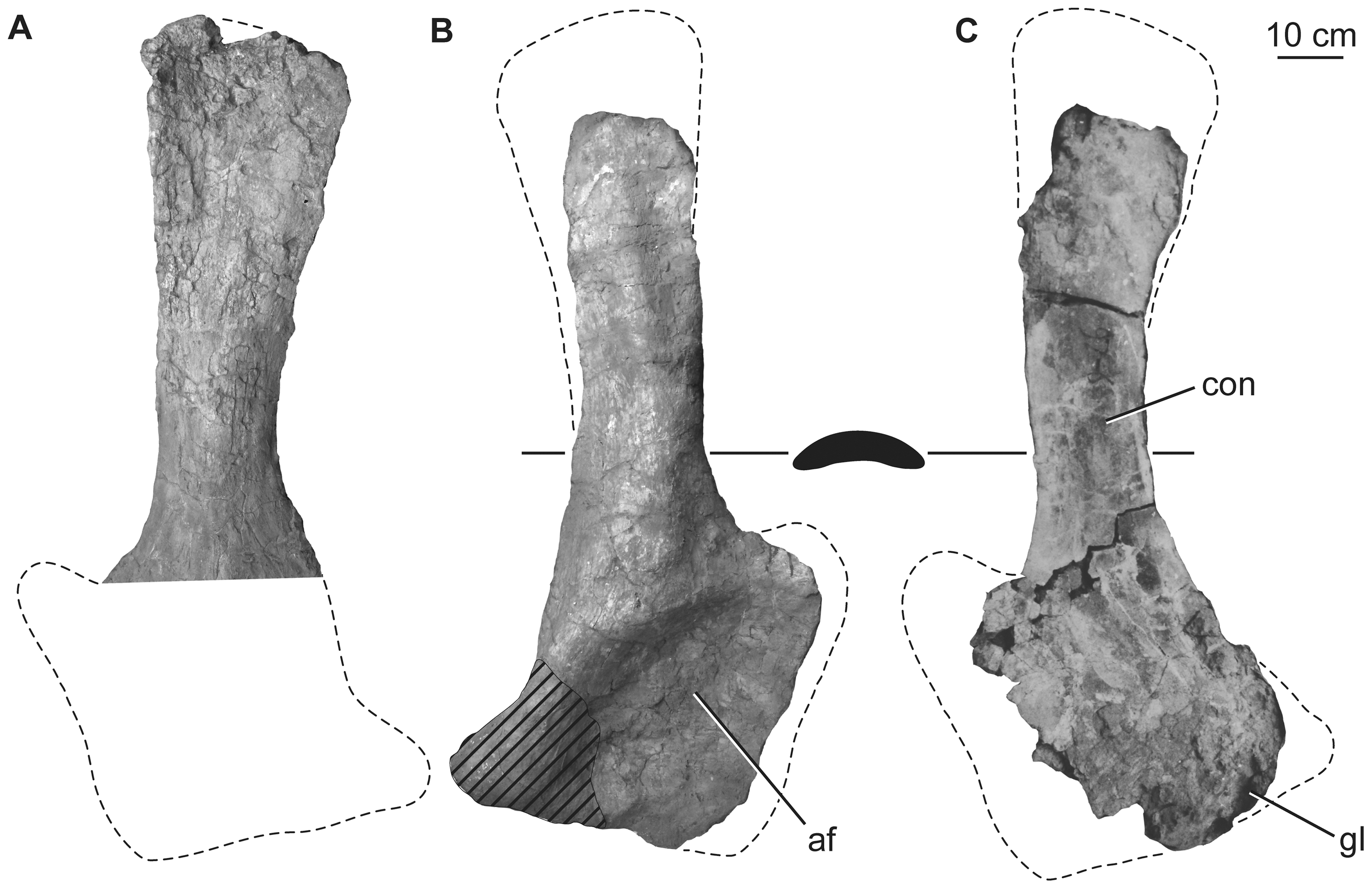
Scapula

Although the exact orientation of the pectoral girdle in vivo is uncertain, the scapulae and coracoids are generally thought to have been oblique to the major planes of orientation of the rest of the body, rendering orientational descriptors somewhat difficult to select. Aside from the glenoid region, which is damaged or missing in both specimens, the preserved parts of the left and right scapulae complement one another to give a full picture of the morphology of the element. The scapulae consist of a broad proximal plate comprising an acromion and acromial fossa and a blade that forms more than half the length of the bone. The lateral surface of the acromial plate is excavated anterior to the acromial ridge and dorsal to the glenoid region. The acromial ridge is slightly posteriorly deflected, such that it is oriented at an acute angle to the long axis of the scapular blade. Immediately posterior to the glenoid articular surface, the ventral margin of the scapula is broad and convex transversely, but rapidly narrows as it merges into the base of the blade. No prominent subtriangular process seems to occur along the posteroventral edge of the proximal scapula, though its absence could be due to damage. A broad ridge extends longitudinally along the proximal third of the lateral face of the blade. The dorsal margin of the blade is straight, whereas the ventral margin expands distally such that the ratio of the maximum to minimum blade dorsoventral height is 1.7, less than the originally described value of ca. 2. The development of the acromion and distal expansion of the blade are similar to those of other somphospondylans and not as marked as in rebbachisaurids.

The left radius is damaged at its proximal and distal ends. The radius is gracile, with a midshaft width to length ratio of 0.12. In anterior view, the lateral face of the shaft is straight, whereas the medial face is concave. The anteroposteriorly expanded proximal end has a prominent ridge on its lateral face. The proximal end has an approximately oval outline with a pointed anterior process and broadly rounded posterior process. The proximomedial margin is nearly straight, whereas the proximolateral margin is concave anteriorly and convex posteriorly. The oval cross-section of the upper shaft gradually transforms into a rounded D-shape at mid-shaft, with the long axis of the cross section extending transversely. This 'D' shape becomes more anteriorly compressed towards the distal end, with a transversely rounded anterior face and increasingly flattened posterior face. This is associated with the strong transverse expansion of the distal shaft and distal end of the bone, as originally described as a twisting of the bone. Strong transverse expansion of the distal radius is normally found only in titanosaurs (e.g., Alamosaurus and Jainosaurus) and is considered a local autapomorphy of Huabeisaurus. Posterolateral ridges are weak to absent along the distal half of the bone and do not extend further proximally.

== Classification ==
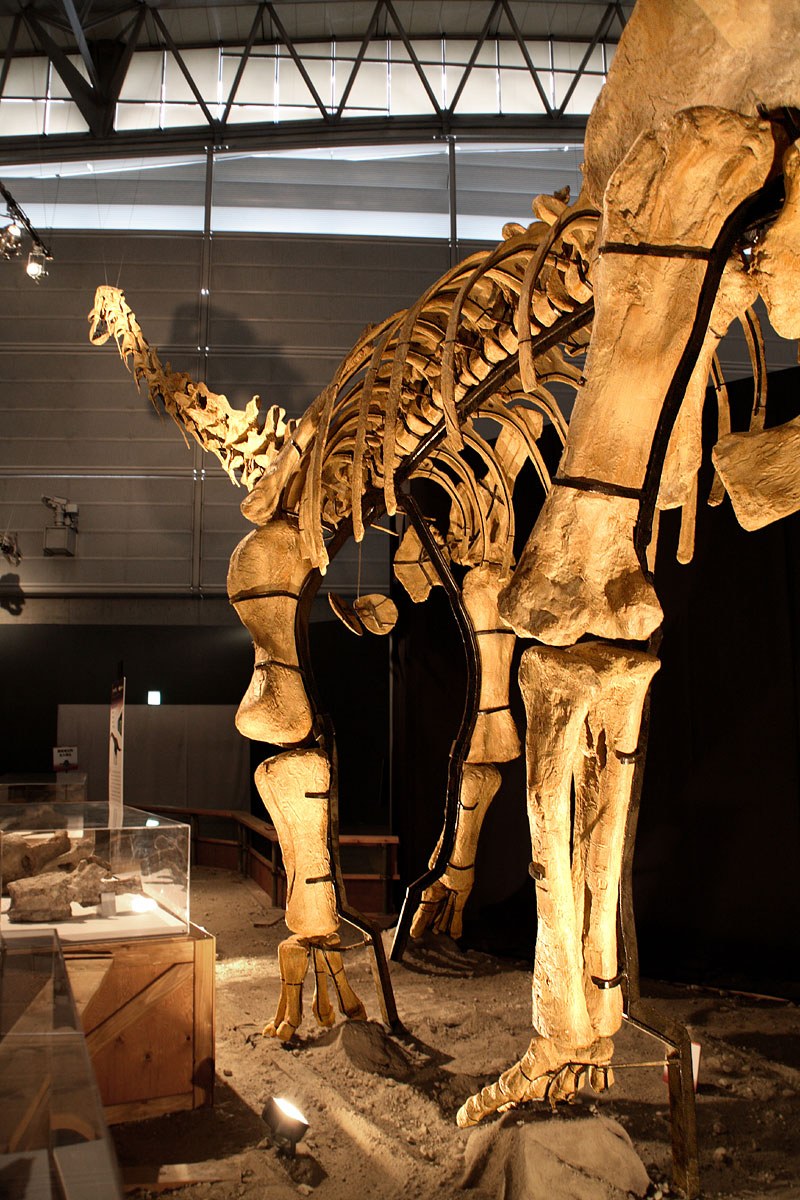
Alternate view of mount

The original description of the species noted strong similarities between the osteology of Huabeisaurus and other Cretaceous East Asian sauropods, and in general, previous studies have pointed to some East Asian Cretaceous sauropod (like Nemegtosaurus and Phuwiangosaurus) as the sister taxon of Huabeisaurus. Since 2000, the year of the original description of Huabeisaurus, 17 new sauropod species have been erected from the Cretaceous of East Asia. Many authors have noted similarities among Cretaceous East Asian sauropods, often suggesting that several of these taxa belong to a clade grounded on a genus with well-known anatomy (like Nemegtosauridae, Opisthocoelicaudinae, and Euhelopodidae). Cladistic support was recently presented for a Euhelopodidae that consisted of exclusively Cretaceous-aged members, in contrast with traditional studies and early cladistic analyses that placed the existence of a Euhelopodidae with Jurassic forms. Both earlier and later analyses suggest some degree of endemism in East Asia, though its temporal duration remains uncertain. On a broader scale, an interesting evolutionary pattern has been recognized wherein all pre-Cretaceous Jurassic Asian sauropods lie outside of Neosauropoda, whereas all Cretaceous Asian sauropods are titanosauriforms. Refining and explaining these paleobiogeographic patterns through time rests on detailed comparisons and comprehensive phylogenetic studies including East Asian sauropods, which are currently lacking.

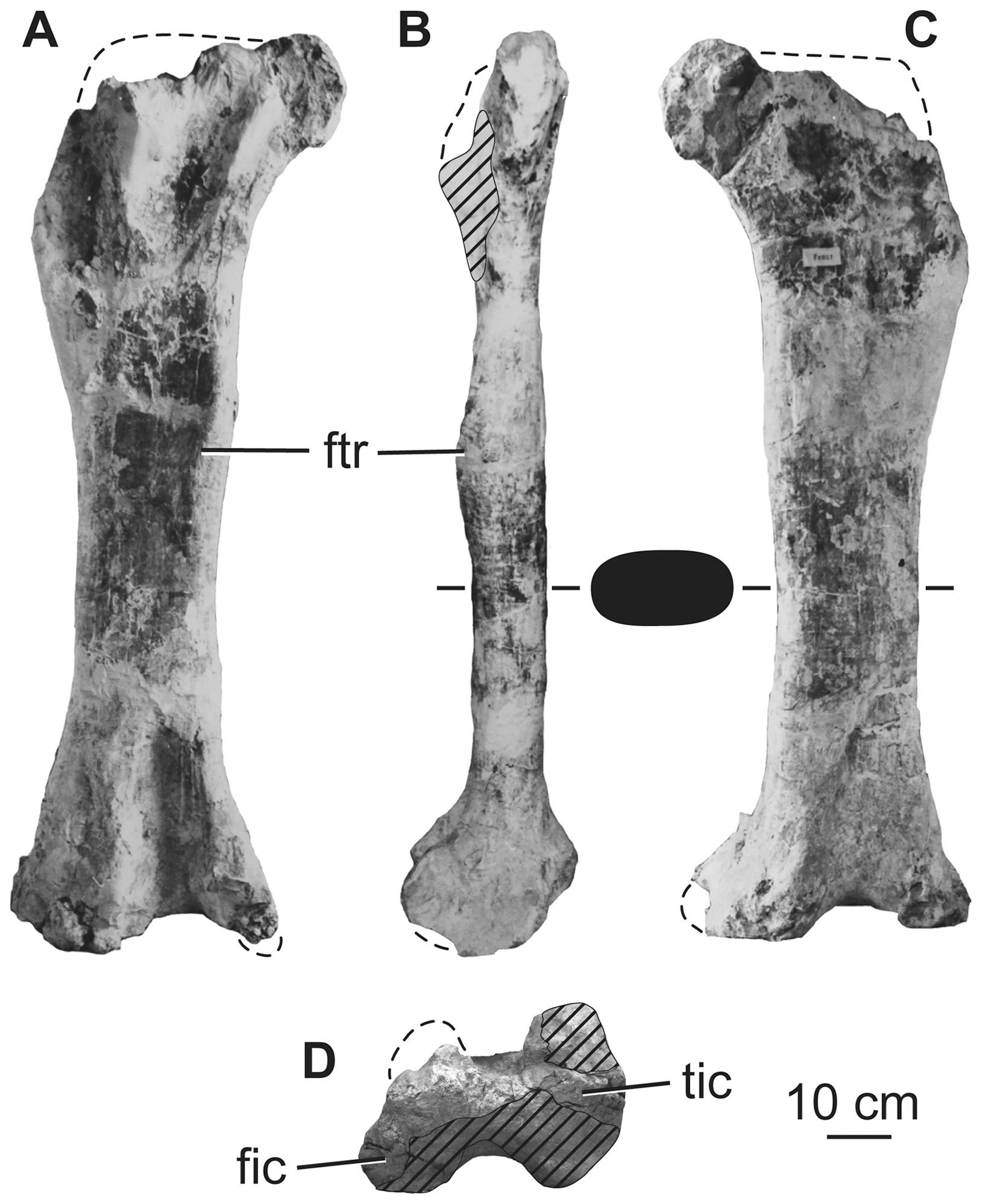
Femur

Several authors have commented on the affinities of Huabeisaurus on comparative and cladistic grounds. Buffetaut et al. reviewed the sauropods of Thailand and described Late Jurassic and Early Cretaceous teeth similar to those of euhelopodids (in the traditional sense, i.e., Euhelopus, Mamenchisaurus and Omeisaurus) and others more reminiscent of Nemegtosaurus and Phuwiangosaurus (which they termed nemegtosaurids). Following these comparisons, Huabeisaurus was regarded as a nemegtosaurid by Buffetaut et al.. Upchurch et al. considered Huabeisaurus to represent a titanosauriform or titanosaur outside of Lithostrotia on the basis of a variety of features. You et al. suggested a close relationship between Huabeisaurus, Borealosaurus, and Opisthocoelicaudia. Mo et al. highlighted similarities among Huabeisaurus, Fusuisaurus, and Sonidosaurus. Tanimoto et al. considered Huabeisaurus to be closely related to Nemegtosaurus, Borealosaurus and the "Toba sauropod" of Japan (as members of Nemegtosauridae). Finally, it has recently been suggested by D'emic et al. that Huabeisaurus is a member of Euhelopodidae.

A new family was erected to place Huabeisaurus in, along with the closely related Tangvayosaurus. The family was named Huabeisauridae. Recently, the family was again proposed, this time by D'Emic et al. because Euhelopodidae, which Huabeisaurus has been assigned to most recently, might have to be split into smaller clades throughout the Somphospondyli because of all the taxa assigned to it.

Pang and Cheng tentatively suggested that "Titanosaurus" falloti be referred to Huabeisaurus. However, "T." falloti is only represented by femoral remains, and its femur bears no uniquely shared features with Huabeisaurus. Furthermore, the femora of Huabeisaurus and "T." falloti differ in the bevel of the distal end versus the long axis of the bone, so the two cannot represent the same genus.

=== Distinguishing characteristics ===
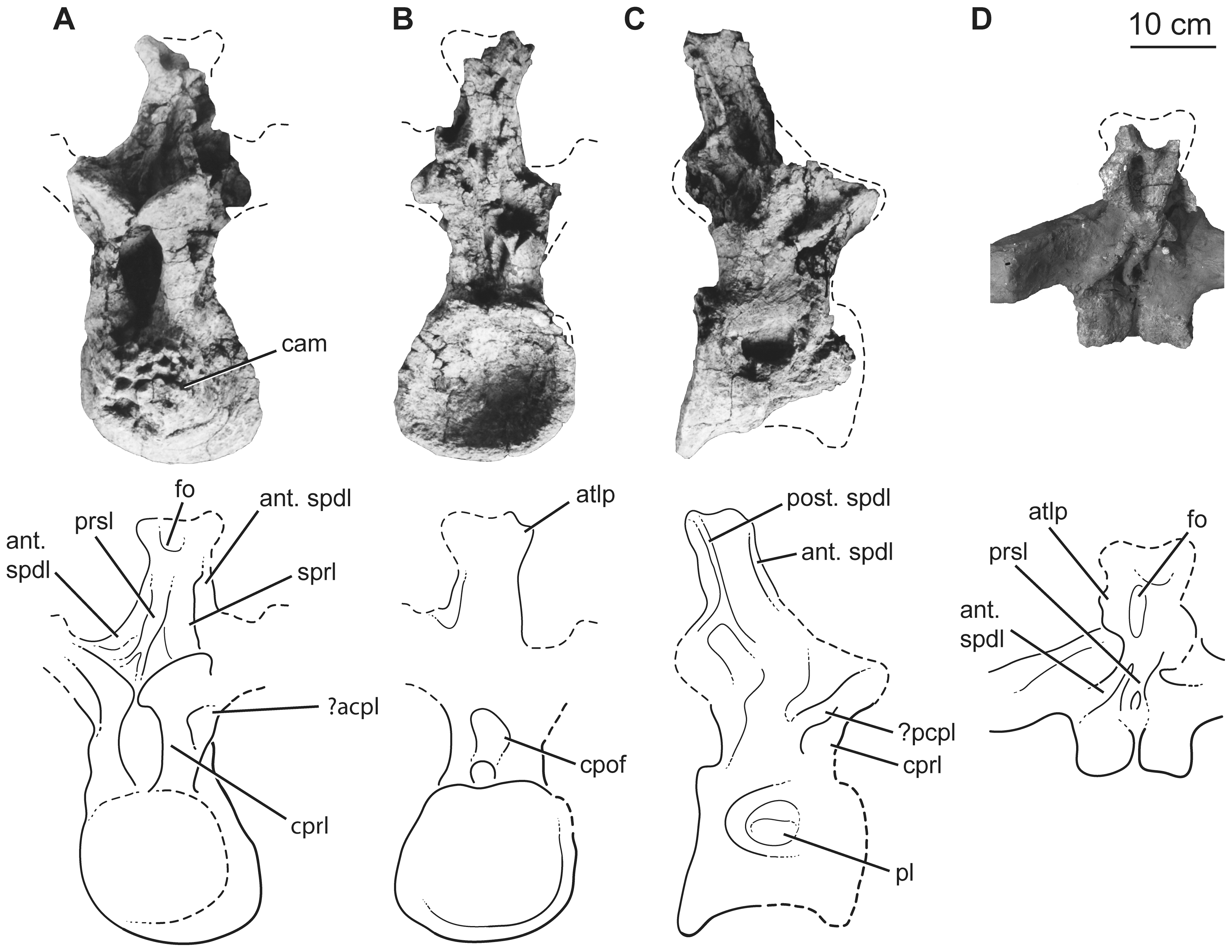
Dorsal vertebra

According to D'Emic et al. (2013) Huabeisaurus can be distinguished based on this set of autapomorphies: the division of some presacral vertebral laminae; posterior cervical vertebrae with a divided prezygodiapophyseal lamina; anterior dorsal vertebrae with a divided anterior spinodiapophyseal lamina; the presence of postzygapophyseal spinodiapophyseal fossa that are larger than postzygapophyseal centrodiapophyseal fossa on anterior-middle caudal vertebrae; caudal vertebrae with small caudal ribs that disappear around caudal vertebra eight; ventrally one-third of anterior-middle caudal vertebral centra expanded posteriorly; two longitudinal ridges on the lateral faces of mid-caudal vertebral centra; a coracoid with tubercle near anterodorsal edge of lateral face; the distal end of radius about twice as broad transversely as midshaft (convergently acquired in derived titanosaurs); a tubercle on ischial plate that projects from posterior margin; the development of fossae relative to one another in caudal vertebral neural arches; and a high tibia-to-femur ratio.

== Paleoecology ==
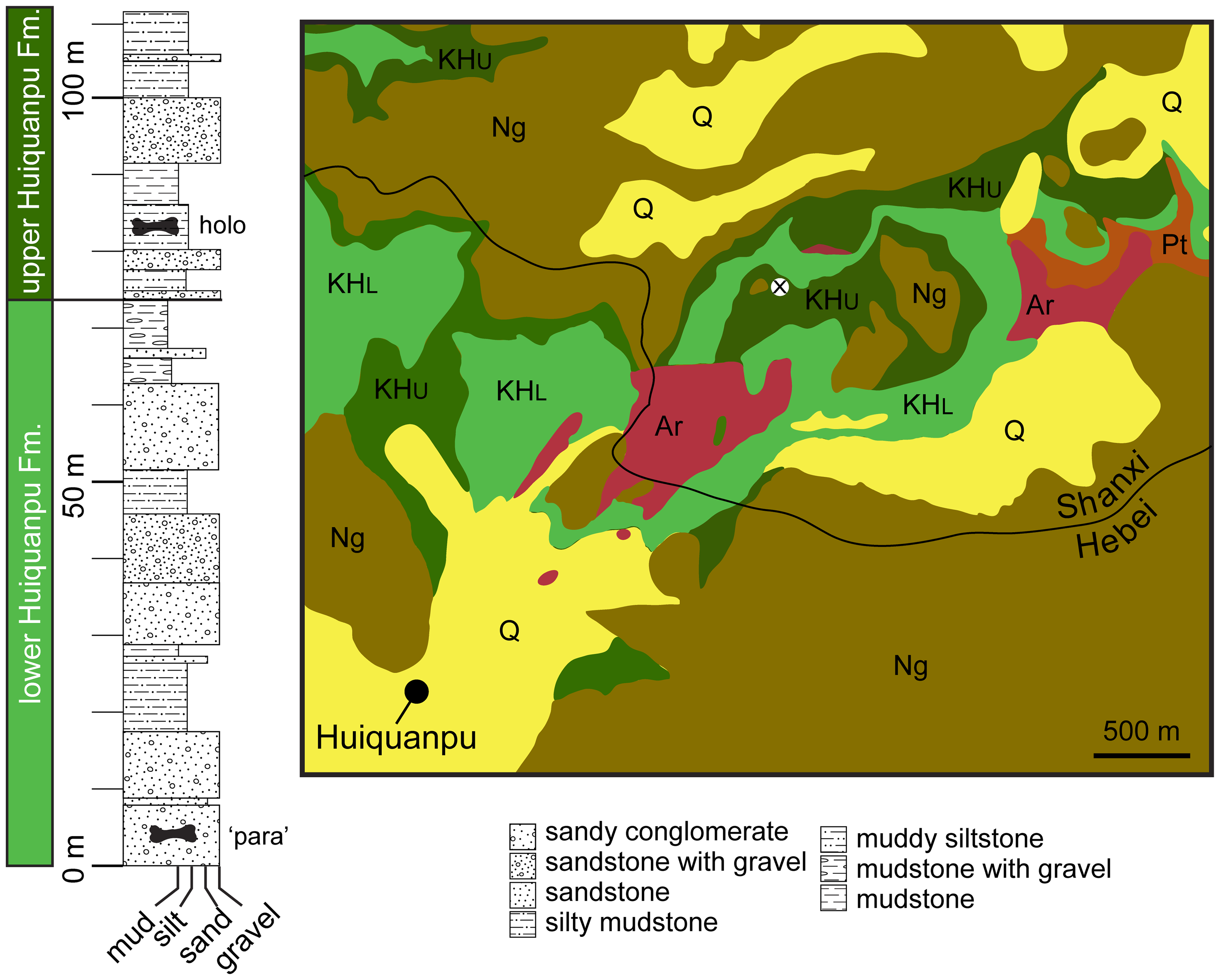
Stratigraphic map of the area around the discovery site of Huabeisaurus

An isolated humerus, designated the paratype by Pang and Cheng, comes from a locality over 200 meters away from the type locality of Huabeisaurus, in a fluvially deposited sandy conglomeratic layer in the lower member of the Huiquanpu Formation. This layer is roughly 90 m lower stratigraphically than the type horizon of Huabeisaurus, which comes from the upper member of the Huiquanpu Formation. The humerus thus comes from a stratum representing a different and likely older depositional environment than that of Huabeisaurus, and does not overlap anatomically with the holotypic skeleton, and so cannot currently be referred to that taxon. The horizon that yielded the humerus also contains hadrosaurid specimens referred to cf. Shantungosaurus sp. and indeterminate ankylosaurid material.

Huabeisaurus comes from Kangdailiang and Houyu, Zhaojiagou Town, Tianzhen County, Shanxi province, China. The holotype was found in the unnamed upper member of the Huiquanpu Formation, which is Late Cretaceous (?Cenomanian–?Campanian) in age based on ostracods, charophytes, and fission-track dating.

The geology of the type locality of the Huiquanpu Formation was described in a series of reports. The specimen was found near the base of the upper member of the Huiquanpu Formation, in a fluvially deposited silty mudstone. This locality has also produced the ankylosaur Tianzhenosaurus, theropod material referred to cf. Szechuanosaurus campi (now regarded as a nomen dubium), and indeterminate hadrosaurid material. This species also coexisted with ostracods and charophytes, and the ankylosaurian Shanxia, considered by Weishampel et al. to be ankylosauria indet.
