= Huiquanpu Formation =

Geological formation in China

- Stratigraphic range: Late Cretaceous; ~Campanian–Maastrichtian
- Type: Geological formation
- Underlies: Middle Miocene basalt
- Overlies: Archean gneiss basement
- Thickness: Over 200 m (660 ft)

Lithology
- Primary: Mudstone
- Other: Conglomerate

Location
- Coordinates: 40.3°N 114.2°E
- Approximate paleocoordinates: 40.4°N 104.4°E
- Region: Hebei & Shanxi Provinces
- Country: China
- Huiquanpu Formation (China) Huiquanpu Formation (Shanxi)

The Huiquanpu Formation (simplified Chinese: 灰泉堡组; traditional Chinese: 灰泉堡組; pinyin: Huīquánpù Zǔ) is a geological formation in Shanxi and Hebei provinces, China, whose strata date back to the Late Cretaceous period. It predominantly consists of purple-red mudstone, with subordinate grey-white sandy conglomerates.

Dinosaur remains are among the fossils that have been recovered from the formation.

== Fossil content ==
Color key: Taxon / Reclassified taxon / Taxon falsely reported as present / Dubious taxon or junior synonym / Ichnotaxon / Ootaxon / Morphotaxon	Notes; Uncertain or tentative taxa are in small text; ~~crossed out~~ taxa are discredited.

=== Dinosaurs ===
==== Ornithopods ====
Ornithopods of the Huiquanpu Formation
Genus	Species	Location	Stratigraphic position	Material	Notes	Images
Datonglong	D. tianzhenensis			Lower jaw	A hadrosauroid ornithopod	

==== Sauropods ====
Sauropods of the Huiquanpu Formation
Genus	Species	Location	Stratigraphic position	Material	Notes	Images
Huabeisaurus	H. allocotus			Teeth and postcranial skeleton	A euhelopodid somphospondylan	

==== Theropods ====
Theropods of the Huiquanpu Formation
Genus	Species	Location	Stratigraphic position	Material	Notes	Images
Jinbeisaurus	J. wangi			Maxilla, dentary and fragmentary postcrania	A tyrannosauroid	

==== Thyreophorans ====
Thyreophorans of the Huiquanpu Formation
Genus	Species	Location	Stratigraphic position	Material	Notes	Images
Shanxia	S. tianzhenensis			Partial skeleton	An ankylosaurid	
Tianzhenosaurus	T. chengi			Skull and partial skeleton	An ankylosaurid	
Tianzhenosaurus	T. youngi			Skull and partial skeleton	An ankylosaurid	

== See also ==
- List of dinosaur-bearing rock formations
