= Datonglong =

Datonglong Temporal range: Late Cretaceous, 99–80 Ma

Scientific classification
- Kingdom: Animalia
- Phylum: Chordata
- Class: Reptilia
- Clade: Dinosauria
- Clade: †Ornithischia
- Clade: †Ornithopoda
- Genus: †Datonglong; Xu et al., 2016
- Species: †D. tianzhenensis

Binomial name
- †Datonglong tianzhenensis Xu et al., 2016

Extinct genus of dinosaurs

Datonglong is an extinct genus of herbivorous ornithopod dinosaur, belonging to the Hadrosauroidea, which lived in the Late Cretaceous period in present-day China. Its type species is Datonglong tianzhenensis.

== Discovery and naming ==
In 2008, a team from the Shanxi Museum of Geological and Mineral Science and Technology in the Kangdailiang quarry in Shanxi discovered the jaw of a euornithopod.

In 2016, the species Datonglong tianzhenensis was named and described by Xu Shicha, You Hailu, Wang Jiawei, Wang Suozhu, Yi Jian, and Jia Lei. The generic name refers to the city of Datong and the Chinese word long (龍), which means "dragon". The specific name refers to its origins in Tianzhen county. Datonglong was one of eighteen dinosaur taxa from 2015 to be described in open access or free-to-read journals.

== Description ==
The holotype, SXMG V 00005, consists of a portion of the lower jaw with some preserved teeth. The fossil was found in a layer of the Huiquanpu Formation. Though the exact time the fossil was deposited is unknown, it is believed to date from somewhere in the Cenomanian-Campanian timeframe, roughly 95 to 80 million years ago.

Datonglong was described as a new genus because of its unique dental structures. In the middle and back of the jaw are two functional teeth in each tooth position. Further, the main ridge of the tooth on the inner side is situated more to the back, while the secondary ridge is well developed. There are no further vertical ridges. The top of the tooth crown is bent slightly backwards.

The only known fossil of dinosaur's dentarium has a length of 34 centimetres (13 in) and contains at least twenty-seven tooth positions, though it is believed it may have possessed up to twenty-nine tooth positions. The processus coronoides is vertically oriented. The teeth are large, standing up to 5.5 centimetres (2.2 in) for a tooth not yet broken out. Teeth stand in groups of three or four in the tooth battery.

== Classification ==
Datonglong is in the Hadrosauroidea clade, and is closely related to, but not part of, the Hadrosauridae family. However, this placement is not based on an exact cladistic analysis.

== See also ==
- 2016 in paleontology
