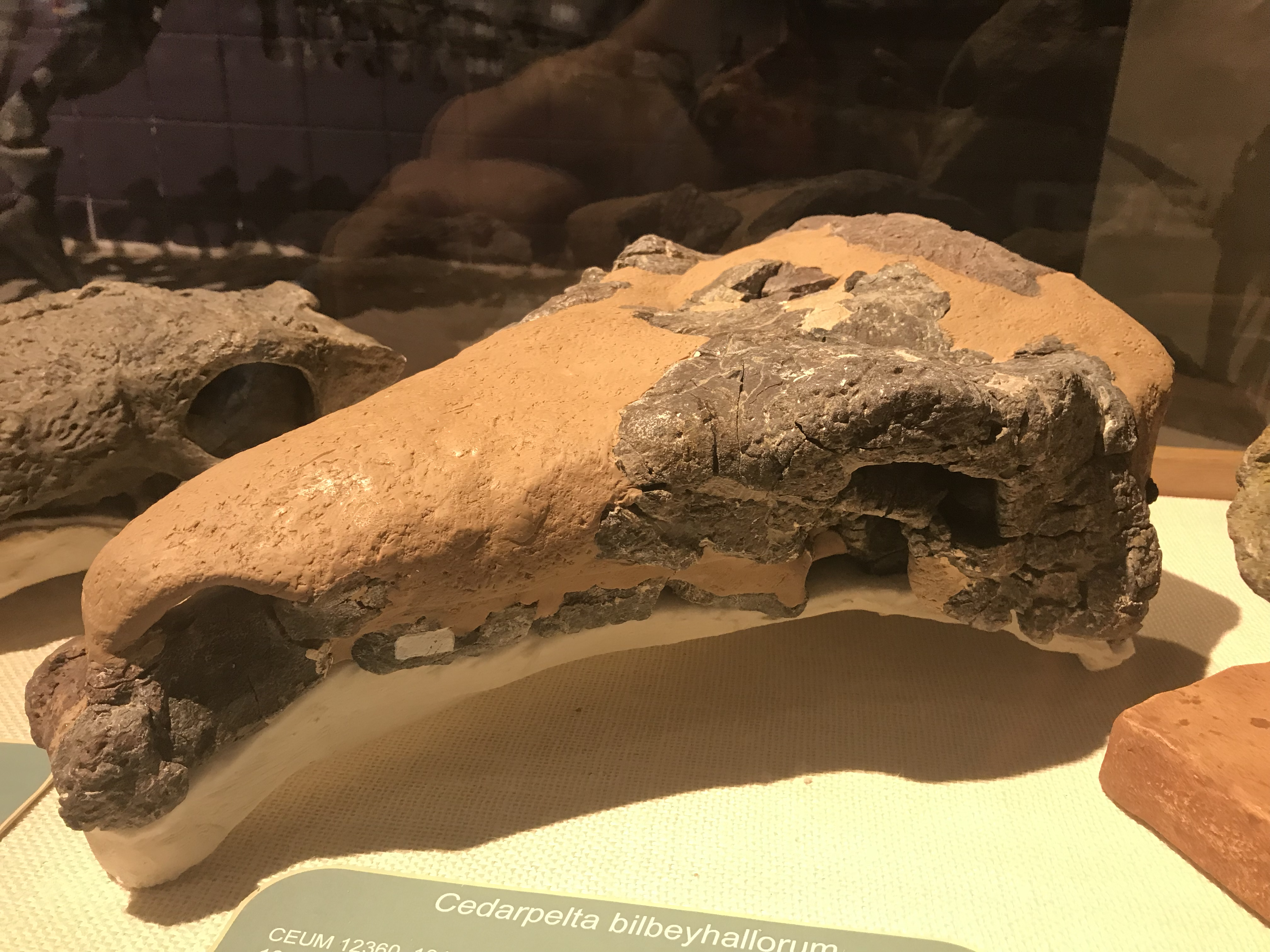
- Skull of Cedarpelta bilbeyhallorum, on display at the USU Eastern Prehistoric Museum, Price, Utah.

Scientific classification
- Kingdom: Animalia
- Phylum: Chordata
- Class: Reptilia
- Clade: Dinosauria
- Clade: †Ornithischia
- Clade: †Thyreophora
- Clade: †Ankylosauria
- Family: †Ankylosauridae
- Genus: †Cedarpelta; Carpenter et al., 2001
- Species: †C. bilbeyhallorum

Binomial name
- †Cedarpelta bilbeyhallorum Carpenter et al., 2001

= Cedarpelta =

Cedarpelta Temporal range: Late Cretaceous, 98.2–93 Ma

Extinct genus of reptiles

Cedarpelta is an extinct genus of basal ankylosaurid dinosaur from Utah that lived during the Late Cretaceous period (Cenomanian to lower Turonian stage, 98.2 to 93 Ma) in what is now the Mussentuchit Member of the Cedar Mountain Formation. The type and only species, Cedarpelta bilbeyhallorum, is known from multiple specimens including partial skulls and postcranial material. It was named in 2001 by Kenneth Carpenter, James Kirkland, Don Burge, and John Bird. Cedarpelta has an estimated length of 7 metres (23 feet) and weight of 5 tonnes (11,023 lbs). The skull of Cedarpelta lacks extensive cranial ornamentation and is one of the only known ankylosaurs with individual skull bones that are not completely fused together.

== Discovery and naming ==
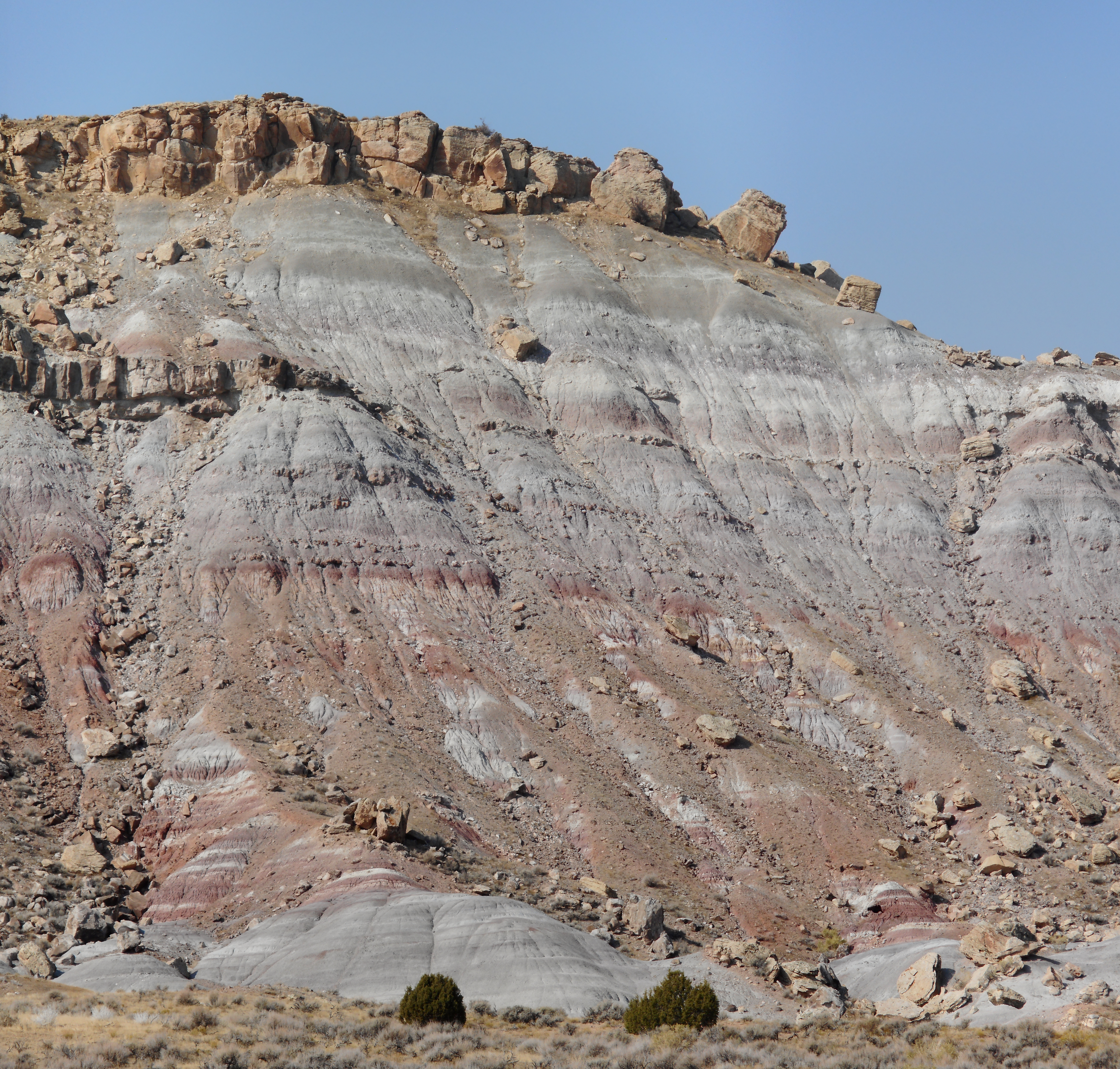
Cedar Mountain Formation in Utah.

The partial remains of an ankylosaur were discovered by Evan Hall and Sue Ann Bilbey at the CEM site near the Price River in Carbon County, Utah while they were visiting an excavation in the surrounding area. The site was originally interpreted as being from the top of the Ruby Ranch Member of the Cedar Mountain Formation, but was later interpreted as being from the bottom of the Mussentuchit Member. The age of the layer was originally thought to have been 104.46 ± 0.95 Ma, but more recent estimates date it to 98.2 ± 0.6 to 93 Ma. In 1998, the discovery was reported by Kenneth Carpenter and James Kirkland. In 2001, it was subsequently described, along with other material, by Kenneth Carpenter, James Kirkland, Don Burge, and John Bird. The holotype specimen, CEUM 12360, consists of a partial skull that is missing the snout and lower jaws. Numerous osteoderms, postcranial material and a disarticulated skull were designated as paratype specimens. Both holotype and paratype specimens represent at least three individuals and are currently housed at the College of Eastern Utah, Prehistoric Museum, Utah.

The generic name, Cedarpelta, is derived from the Cedar Mountain Formation and the Greek word "pelte" (small shield). The specific name, bilbeyhallorum, honours Sue Ann Bilbey and Evan Hall, who discovered the remains of Cedarpelta.

In 2008, additional specimens were referred to Cedarpelta from the Price River II Quarry, which is about 24.5 km southeast of Price River, Utah and at the base of the Mussentuchit Member. The quarry also produced specimens pertaining to four individuals of a brachiosaurid, an iguanodontian, a turtle, a pterosaur, and specimens of the nodosaurid Peloroplites. The referred material includes: CEUM 10396, a cervical vertebra; CEUM 10412, CEUM 10404, caudal vertebrae; CEUM 10371, a coracoid; CEUM 10256, CEUM 11629, humeri; CEUM 10266, an ischium; CEUM 11334, a femur; and CEUM 11640, a tibia.

== Description ==
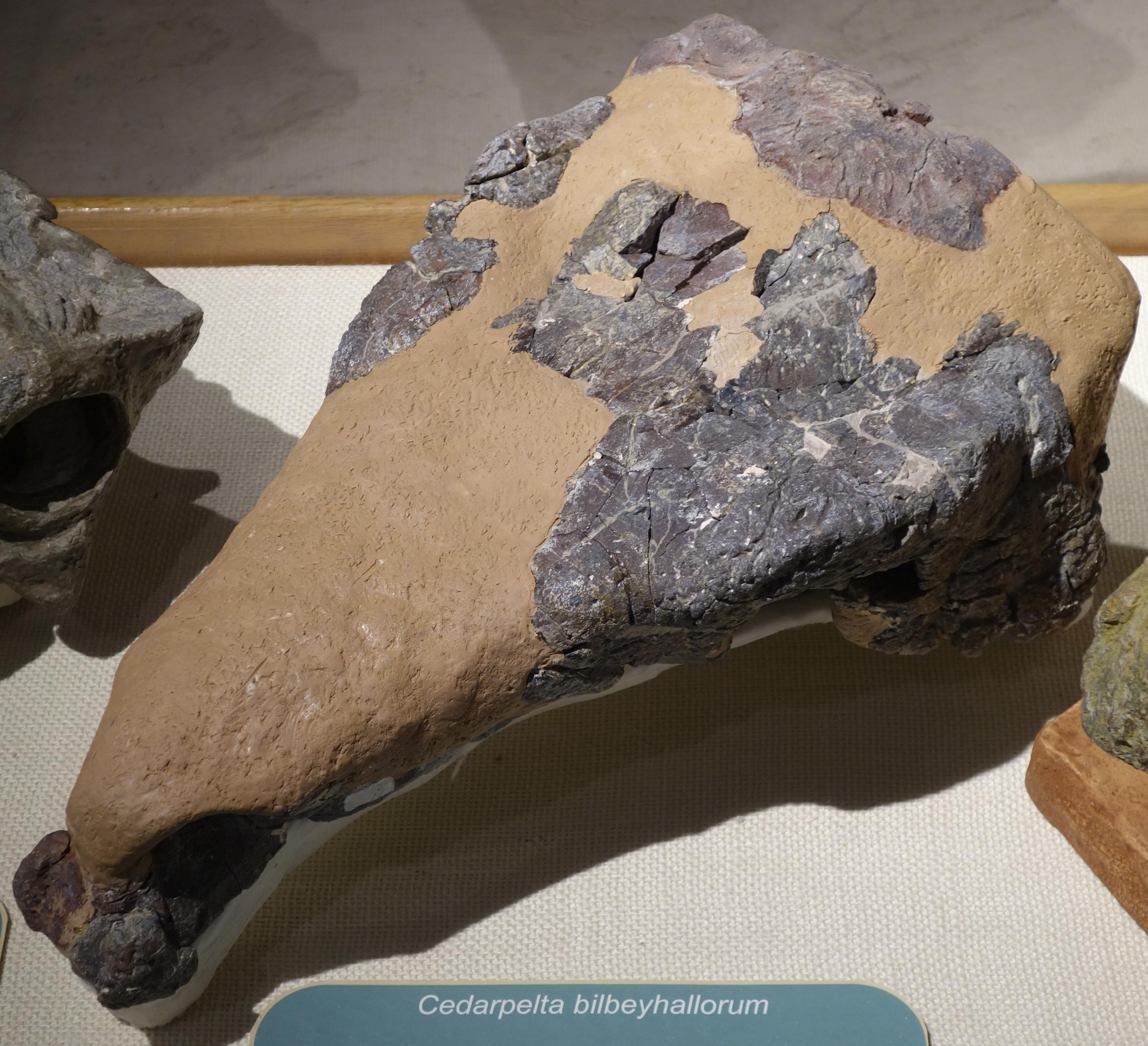
Reconstructed skull containing 70% of original fossil bone.

Carpenter et al. (2001) originally gave Cedarpelta an estimated length of 7.5-8.5 metres (24.6-27.9 feet). However, Gregory S. Paul gave a lower estimate of 7 metres (23 feet) and a weight of 5 tonnes (11,023 lbs), while Thomas Holtz gave a higher estimation at 9 meters suggesting that it was rivalling Ankylosaurus.

Carpenter et al. (2001) established several distinguishing traits of Cedarpelta. The body of the praemaxilla, the front snout bone, is short in front of its nasal branch. The outer sides of the two praemaxillae run more parallel compared to the snouts of later forms which are strongly diverging to behind. The cutting edge of the bone core of the upper beak is limited to the front of the praemaxilla. Each praemaxilla has six (conical) teeth. The quadrate, and with it the entire back of the skull, is inclined to the front. The head of the quadrate is not fused with the paroccipital process, contrary to the situation in Shamosaurus. The neck of the occipital condyle is long and sticking out to behind, like with nodosaurids, not obliquely to below as in typical ankylosaurids. The tubera basilaria, appending processes of the rear lower braincase, form a large wedge directed to below. The pterygoid is elongated from the front to the rear and has a saddle-shaped process on its outer edge oriented to behind and sideways. The coronoid process of the rear lower jaw has an oval process at the inside. The straight ischium has a knob-shaped boss at the inside near the pubic pedicle.

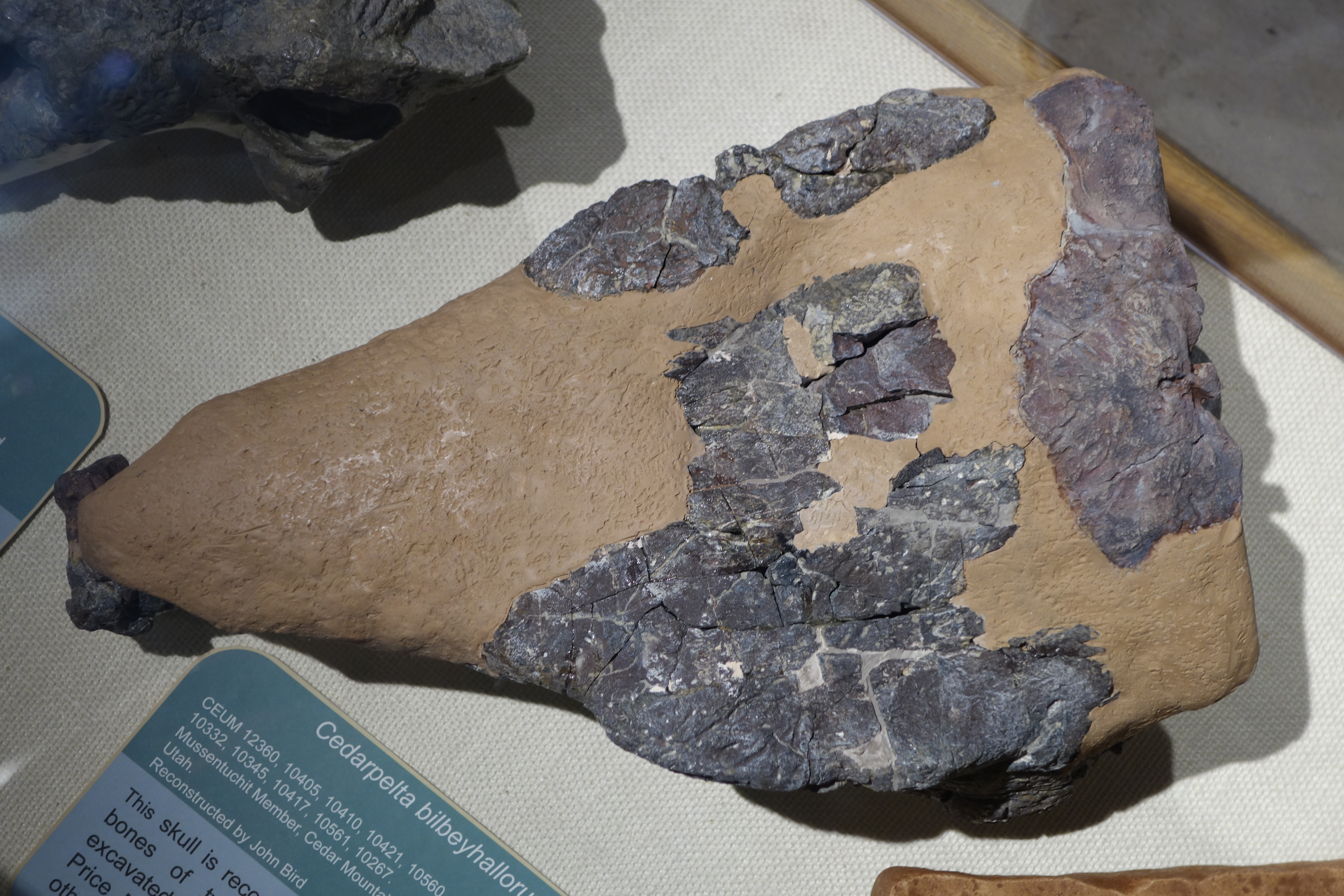
Top view of skull.

Cedarpelta shows a mix of basal and derived traits. The presence of premaxillary teeth is a plesiomorphic character because it is inherited from earlier Ornithischia. In contrast, closure of the opening on the side of the skull behind the orbit, the lateral temporal fenestra, is an advanced, derived (apomorphic) character only known in ankylosaurid ankylosaurians.

Two skulls are known, and the skull length for Cedarpelta is estimated to have been roughly 60 centimetres (24 in). One of the Cedarpelta skulls was found disarticulated, a first for an ankylosaur skull, allowing paleontologists a unique opportunity to examine the individual bones instead of being limited to an ossified unit. The skull is relatively elongated and does not show a strongly appending beak. Of the conical premaxillary teeth, the first is the largest. The maxilla bears eighteen teeth. The eye socket is surrounded by the lacrimal, a single supraorbital and a large postorbital, excluding the prefrontal and the jugal from the orbital rim. The postcranial skeleton was in 2001 not described in any detail.

The skulls, though of large and thus not juvenile individuals, do not show a distinctive pattern of fused caputegulae, head tiles. This inspired Carpenter to propose an alternative hypothesis of ankylosaur skull osteoderm formation. Formerly, it had been assumed that such armour plates were either formed by direct skin ossification into distinct scutes which later fused to the skull (the more popular theory), or by a reaction of the skull bones to the pattern of overlying scales. The lack of a clear pattern in Cedarpelta suggested to Carpenter that the ossification took place in an intermediate layer between the scales and the skull roof itself, which he surmised to have been the periosteum.

== Classification ==
Carpenter (2001) placed Cedarpelta within the family Ankylosauridae and offered two interpretations of its position. The first was that it could be the basalmost known ankylosaurid, i.e. the first discovered branch to split off from the ankylosaurid stem line. This would be in line with its plesiomorphic traits and the fact that the in 2001 supposed Barremian age made it one of the oldest known ankylosaurids. The second was that it formed an early ankylosaurid branch, or clade, Shamosaurinae together with Gobisaurus of north-central China and the eponymous Shamosaurus of Mongolia. Thompson et al. (2012), Chen et al. (2013), Yang et al. (2013), Han et al. (2014), Arbour & Currie (2015), Arbour et al. (2016), Arbour & Evans (2017), Yang et al. (2017), Zheng et al. (2018), Rivera-Sylva et al. (2018), Park et al. (2019) and Frauenfelder et al. (2022) have all found Cedarpelta to be within Ankylosauridae, as either within a polytomy with Liaoningosaurus, Aletopelta, Chuanqilong, Gobisaurus and Shamosaurus or as sister taxon to Chuanqilong. The results of Arbour & Currie (2015) are reproduced below.

- Ankylosauridae
  - - Gastonia
    - Ahshislepelta
  - - Aletopelta
    - Liaoningosaurus
    - - Cedarpelta
      - Chuanqilong
    - - - Gobisaurus
        - Shamosaurus
      - - Crichtonpelta
        - - Tsagantegia
          - "Zhejiangosaurus"
          - - Pinacosaurus grangeri
            - Pinacosaurus mephistocephalus
          - - - Saichania
              - - Tarchia
                - Zaraapelta
            - - Dyoplosaurus
              - - - Talarurus
                  - Nodocephalosaurus
                - - - Ankylosaurus
                    - Anodontosaurus
                  - Euoplocephalus
                  - - Scolosaurus
                    - Ziapelta

Vickaryous et al. (2004) interpreted Cedarpelta as the basalmost member of the family Nodosauridae, positioned even below the nodosaurids Pawpawsaurus, Silvisaurus, and Sauropelta. Wiersma & Irmis (2018) also interpreted Cedarpelta as a nodosaurid. The results of Vickaryous et al. (2004) are reproduced below.

- - - Lesothosaurus diagnosticus
    - - Huayangosaurus taibaii
      - - - Cedarpelta bilbeyhallorum
          - Nodosauridae
        - - Gargoyleosaurus parkpinorum
          - - Minmi paravertebra
            - - Gastonia burgei
              - - - Gobisaurus domoculus
                  - Shamosaurus scutatus
                - - Tsagantegia longicranialis
                  - - Tarchia gigantea
                    - - - Ankylosaurus magniventris
                        - Euoplocephalus tutus
                      - - Saichania chulsanensis
                        - Talarurus plicatospineus
                        - - Pinacosaurus grangeri
                          - - Pinacosaurus mephistocephalus
                            - Tianzhenosaurus youngi

== See also ==
- Timeline of ankylosaur research
