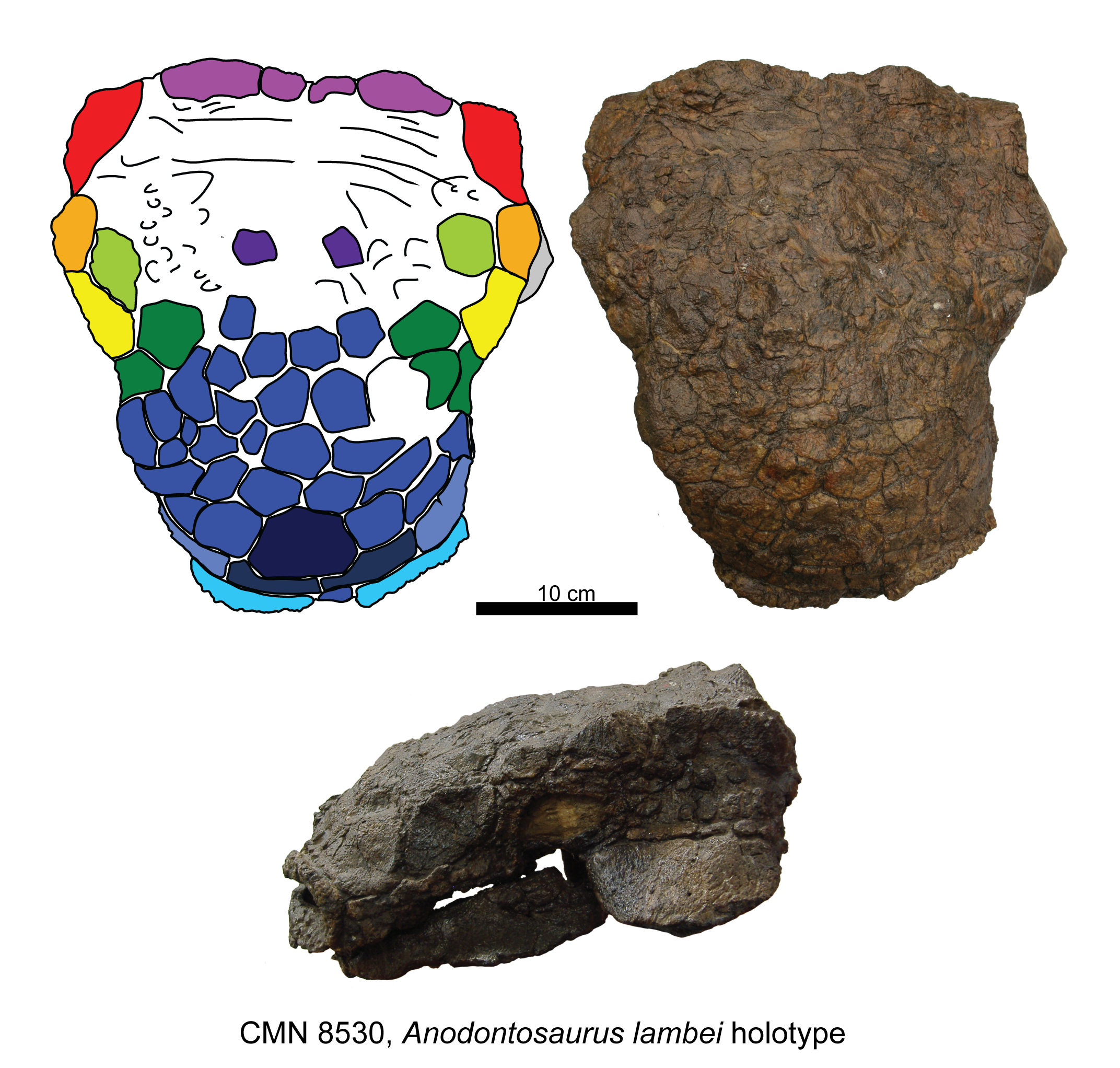
- A. lambei holotype skull CMN 8530

Scientific classification
- Kingdom: Animalia
- Phylum: Chordata
- Class: Reptilia
- Clade: Dinosauria
- Clade: †Ornithischia
- Clade: †Thyreophora
- Clade: †Ankylosauria
- Family: †Ankylosauridae
- Subfamily: †Ankylosaurinae
- Tribe: †Ankylosaurini
- Genus: †Anodontosaurus; Sternberg, 1929

Type species
- †Anodontosaurus lambei Sternberg, 1929

Other species
- †A. inceptus Penkalski, 2018

= Anodontosaurus =

Anodontosaurus Temporal range: Late Cretaceous, 75.6–67 Ma

Extinct genus of dinosaurs

Anodontosaurus is an extinct genus of ankylosaurid dinosaurs within the subfamily Ankylosaurinae. It is known from the entire span of the Late Cretaceous Horseshoe Canyon Formation (mid Late Campanian to "middle" Maastrichtian stage, about 72.8-67 Ma ago) of southern Alberta, Canada, and is also known from the Dinosaur Park Formation (75.6 Ma ago). It contains two species, A. lambei and A. inceptus.

== Discovery ==
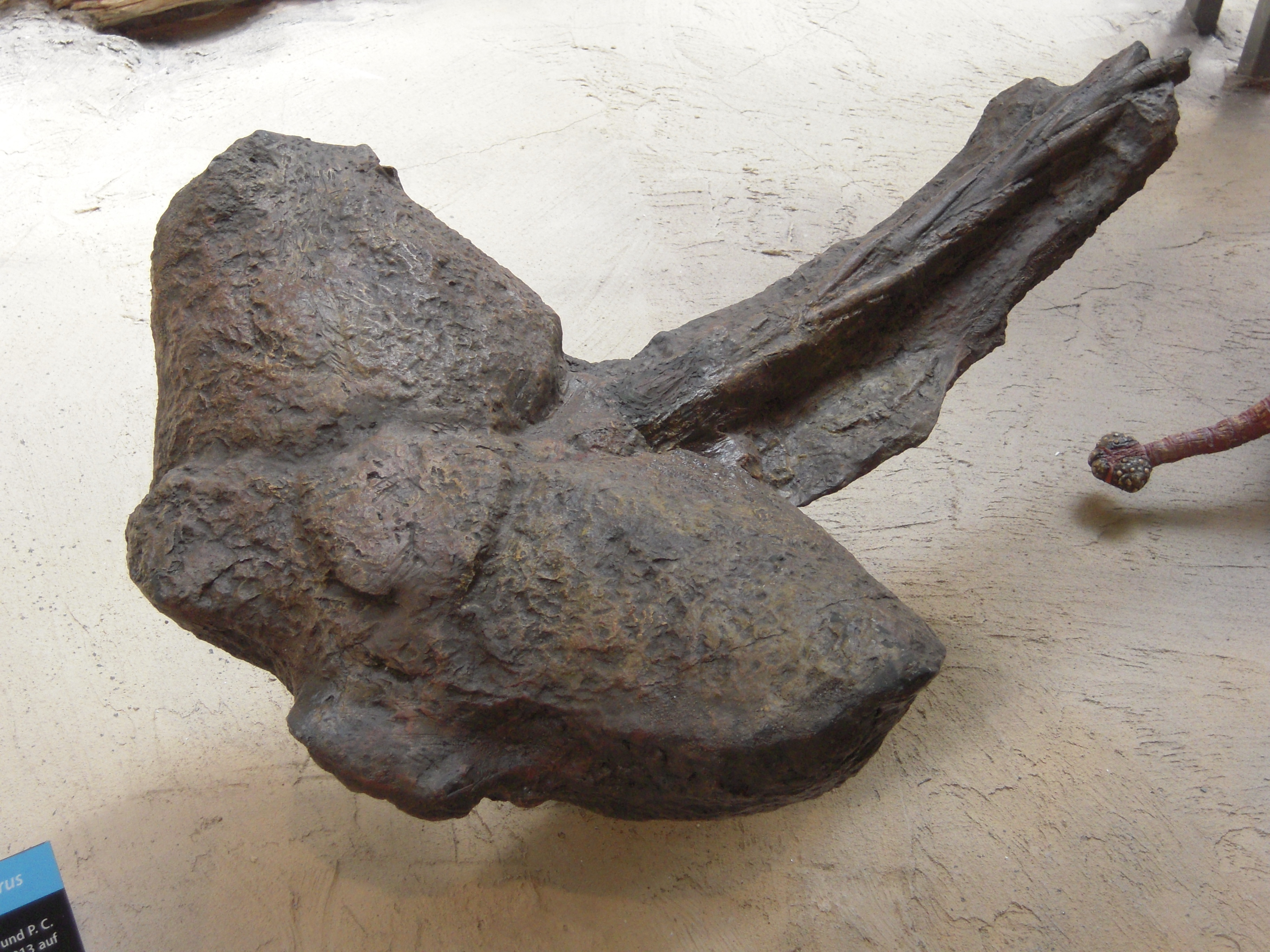
Cast of referred A. lambei tail club AMNH 5245

Anodontosaurus was named by Charles Mortram Sternberg in 1928, based on holotype CMN 8530, a partially preserved skeleton including the skull, half ring, armor and other postcranial remains. The badly crushed skeleton was collected by Sternberg in 1916 from a Canadian Museum of Nature quarry, 8 miles southwest of Morrin. It was collected from the upper part of the Lower Horseshoe Canyon Formation (unit 2), dating to the latest Campanian to the earliest Maastrichtian stage of the Late Cretaceous period, about 71-70.2 million years ago. The generic name means "toothless lizard" in Ancient Greek. It was inspired by the fact that compression damage to the specimen had removed the teeth, at the same time shifting various flat round elements below the skull and on top of the left lower jaw, misleading Sternberg into assuming that large "trituration plates" had replaced the normal dentition. The specific name, lambei, honours Lawrence Morris Lambe, the Canadian geologist and palaeontologist from the Geological Survey of Canada where the holotype was reposited.

In 1986 Coombs examined specimen AMNH 5266, at the time by him referred to Euoplocephalus, and determined that it was a juvenile. It consists of five vertebral centra, a neural arch, one dorsal and two sacral ribs, the right ischium, the complete right hindlimb, the right pes, an incomplete left pes, and various other fragments. AMNH 5266 was discovered in 1912 at Red Deer River and was collected by Barnum Brown with assistance from Peter Kaisen, George Olsen, and Charles M Sternberg in the sediments from the Horseshoe Canyon Formation.

== Description ==
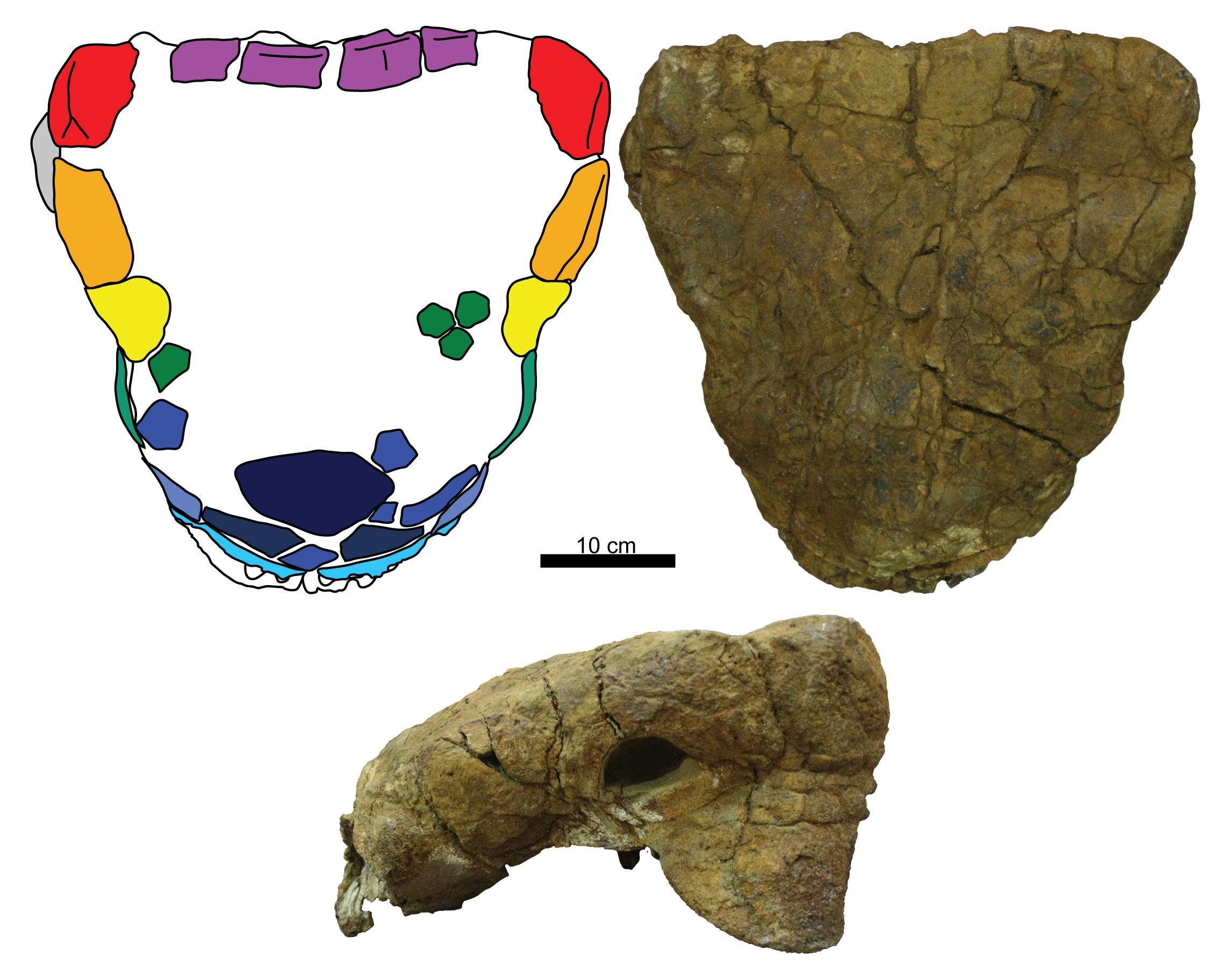
Holotype skull of A. inceptus, TMP 1997.132.1

Anodontosaurus was a medium-sized ankylosaurid, measuring up to 4–5 metres (13–16 ft) in length and 2 metric tons (2.2 short tons) in body mass. It was a quadrupedal, ground-dwelling herbivore. Like other ankylosaurs, Anodontosaurus has armor on a majority of the dorsal surfaces of its body. It has a wide, pointed tail club at the end of its armored tail. The skull features postocular caputegulae, which are small polygonal plates of bone that are present on the cranium and are situated to the immediate rear of the eye.

Coombs supported the assertion that specimen AMNH 5266 represented a juvenile by citing that the vertebral centra were not fused to their neural arches, and that sacral ribs were likewise not fused to vertebrae and to the ilium. Other morphological characters supporting that this is a juvenile specimen include (a) long bones that feature smooth surfaces, which are not marked by the rugosities characteristic of adult bone; (b) the head of the femur is less spherical in shape and is clearly delimited from the adjacent part of the femoral shaft; (c) the distal ends of the tibia and the fibula are not fused to the astragalus and the calcaneum; and (d) the ungual phalanx of the manus is not widest at the proximal articular end as is observed in adults.

== Classification ==
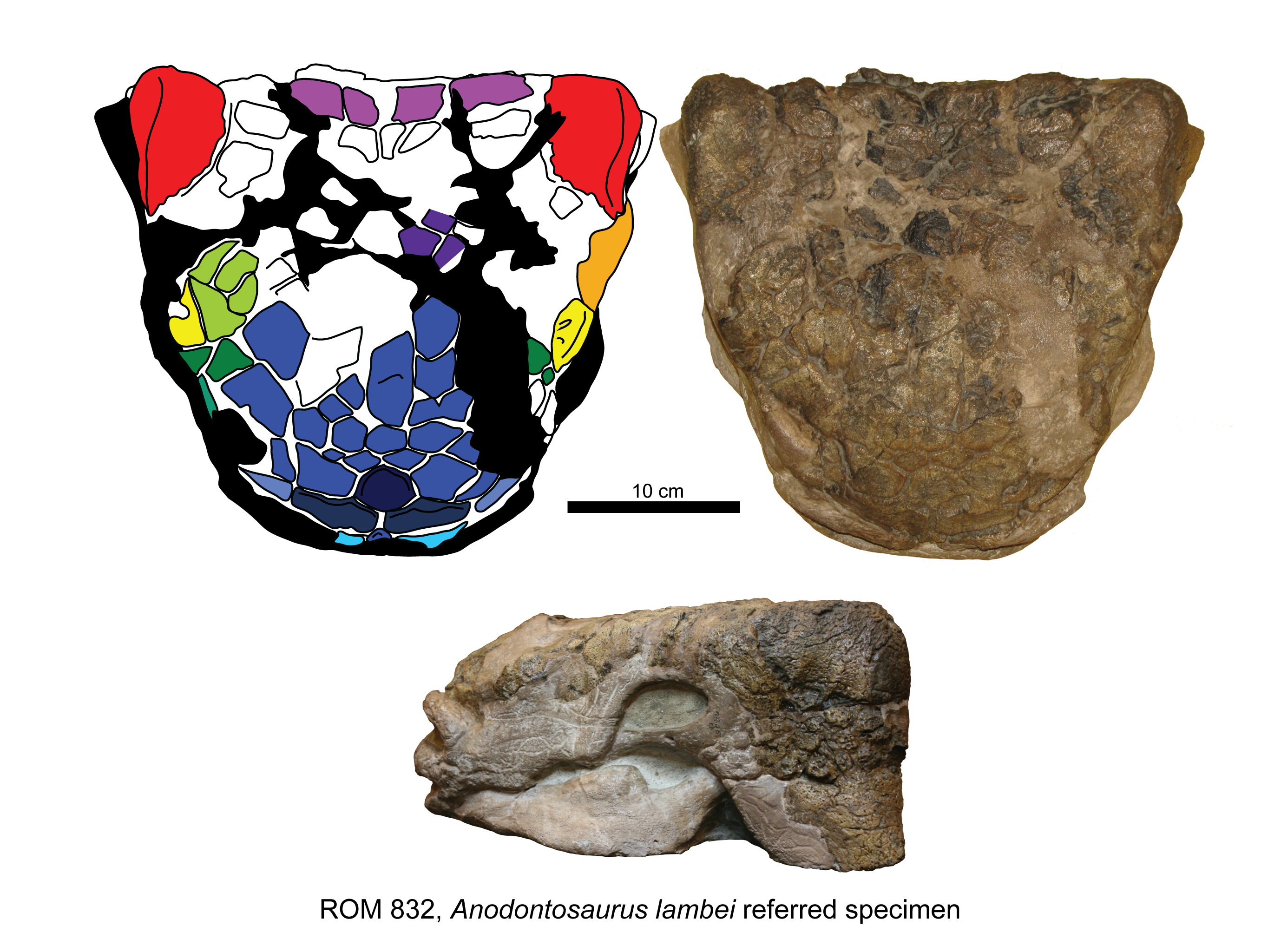
Referred A. lambei skull

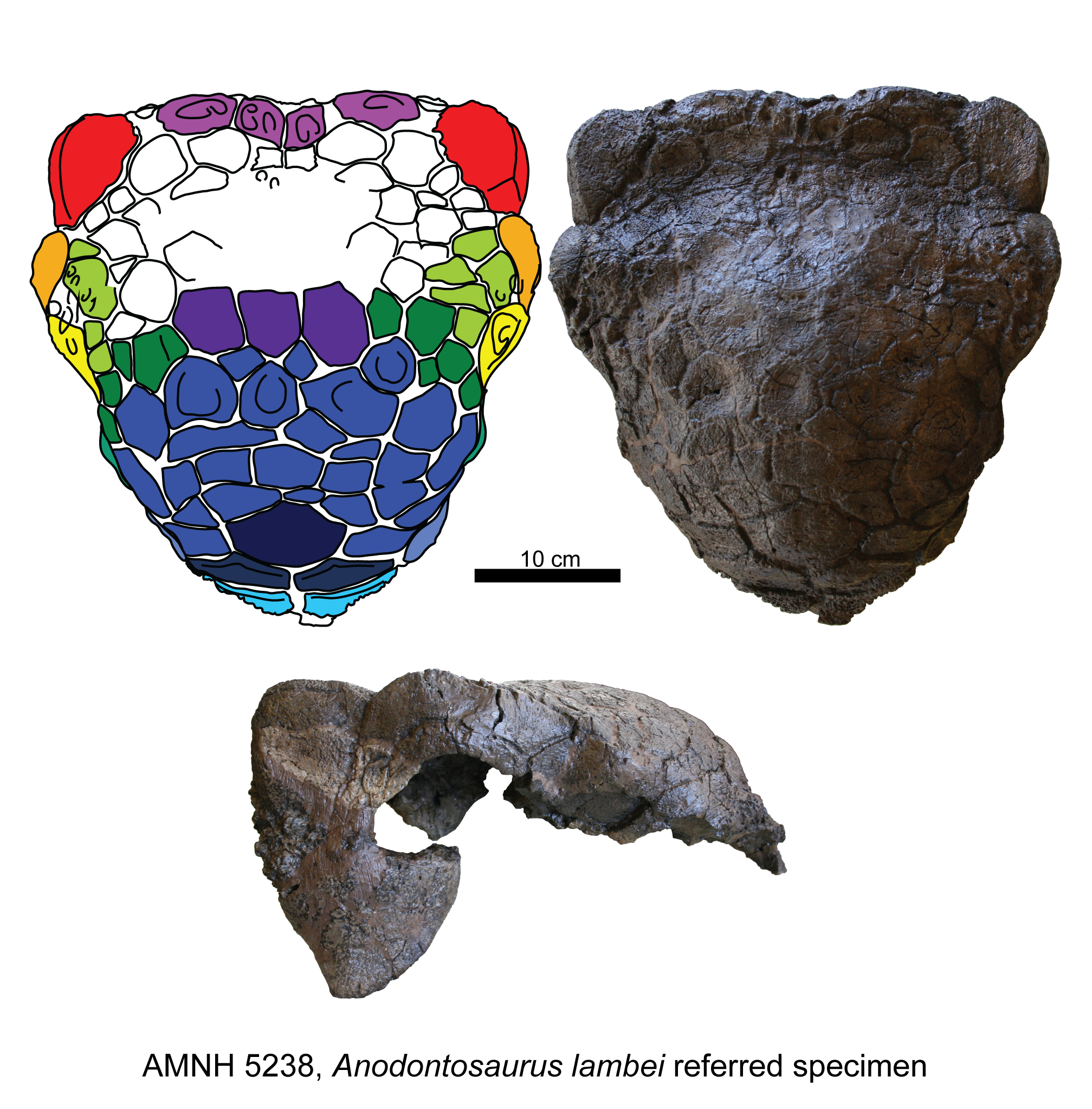
Referred A. inceptus skull AMNH 5238

In 1971, Walter Coombs concluded that there was only one species of ankylosaurid during the Campanian age of the Late Cretaceous of North America. He synonymised the species Anodontosaurus lambei, Dyoplosaurus acutosquameus, and Scolosaurus cutleri with Euoplocephalus tutus. The synonymisation of Anodontosaurus lambei and Euoplocephalus tutus was generally accepted and thus CMN 8530 was assigned to E. tutus. However, following the redescription of Dyoplosaurus as a valid genus by Arbour et al. (2009), in an abstract presented at the SVP 2010 conference, Victoria Arbour considered Anodontosaurus distinct from Euoplocephalus in distinctive skull and cervical half ring ornamentation, as well as tail club morphology, including the presence of pointed, triangular knob osteoderms in Anodontosaurus. She therefore reassigned all Horseshoe Canyon Formation ankylosaurine specimens previously referred to Euoplocephalus to Anodontosaurus.

The validity of Anodontosaurus was formalized in three studies. The first, published by Paul Penkalski and William T. Blows in 2013, re-validated Scolosaurus as well. The second study, by Penkalski (2013), named and described Oohkotokia from Montana on the basis of remains that were originally thought to be referable to Euoplocephalus. Penkalski (2013) performed a small phylogenetic analysis of some ankylosaurine specimens. The only Anodontosaurus specimen that was included in this analysis was its holotype. Anodontosaurus was placed in a polytomy with the holotype of Euoplocephalus and some specimens that are referred to it, while Oohkotokia was placed in a clade with Dyoplosaurus, and specimens that are thought to represent either Dyoplosaurus or Scolosaurus. In a study based on the results of her 2010 SVP abstract, Arbour along with Philip Currie formalized the revalidation of Anodontosaurus, and one specimen from the Dinosaur Park Formation, TMP 1997.132.1, was referred to Anodontosaurus extending the stratigraphic range of the genus back a few million years. The DPF specimen, however, was later made the holotype of a new species, A. inceptus. The following cladogram is based on a 2015 phylogenetic analysis of the Ankylosaurinae conducted by Arbour and Currie:

- Ankylosaurinae
  - Crichtonpelta
  - - Tsagantegia
    - Zhejiangosaurus
    - Pinacosaurus
    - - - Saichania
        - - Tarchia
          - Zaraapelta
      - Ankylosaurini
        - Dyoplosaurus
        - - - Talarurus
            - Nodocephalosaurus
          - - - Ankylosaurus
              - Anodontosaurus
            - Euoplocephalus
            - - Scolosaurus
              - Ziapelta

== See also ==
- Timeline of ankylosaur research
- 2018 in paleontology
