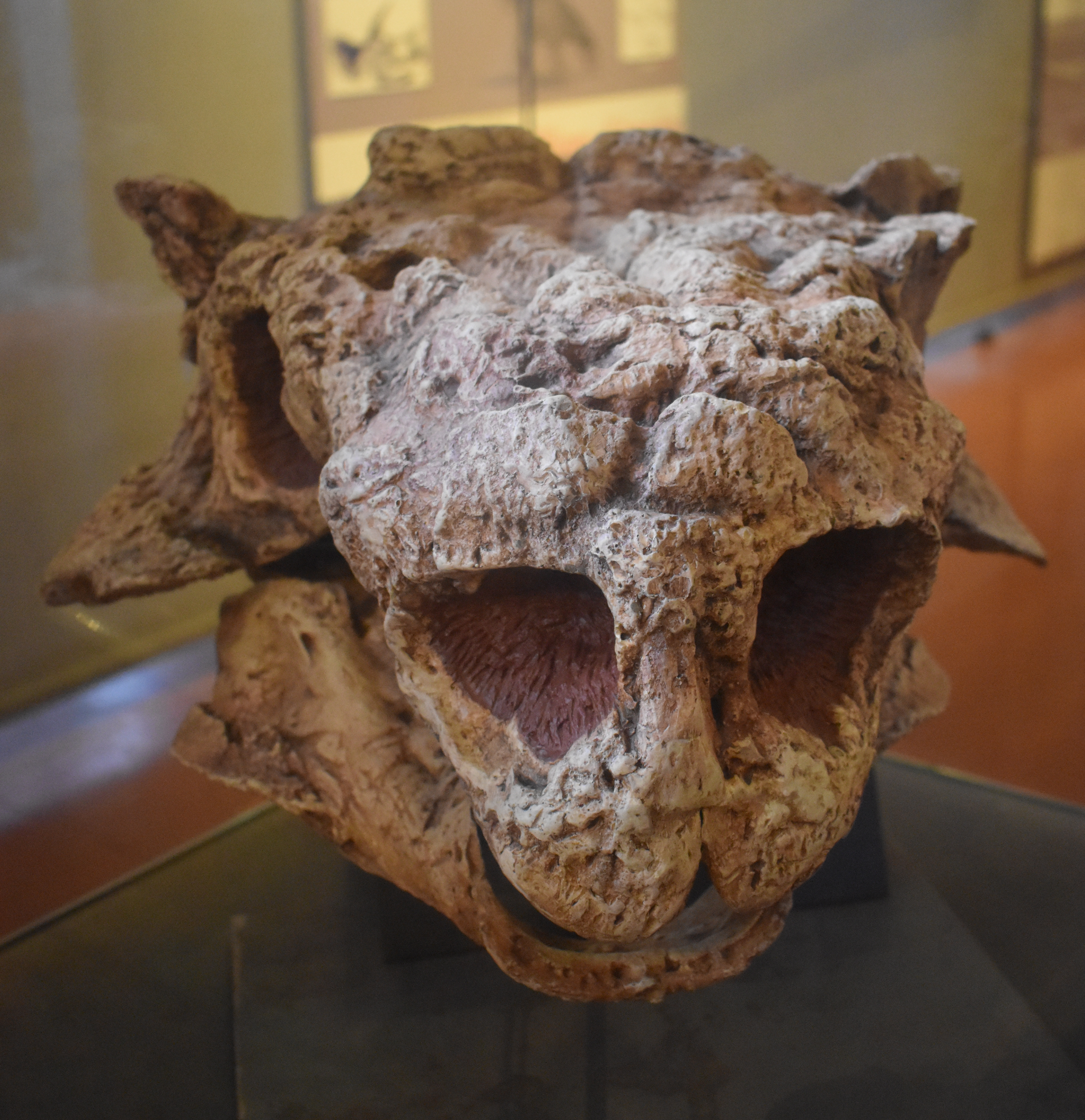
- A cast of specimen PIN 3142/250, the holotype of T. teresae.

Scientific classification
- Kingdom: Animalia
- Phylum: Chordata
- Class: Reptilia
- Clade: Dinosauria
- Clade: †Ornithischia
- Clade: †Thyreophora
- Clade: †Ankylosauria
- Family: †Ankylosauridae
- Subfamily: †Ankylosaurinae
- Genus: †Tarchia; Maryanska, 1977

Type species
- †Tarchia kielanae Maryanska, 1977

Other species
- †T. teresae Penkalski & Tumanova, 2016; †T. tumanovae Park et al., 2021

Synonyms
- Dyoplosaurus giganteus Maleev, 1956; Minotaurasaurus? Miles & Miles, 2009

= Tarchia =

Tarchia Temporal range: Late Cretaceous, Maastrichtian

Extinct genus of dinosaurs

Tarchia (meaning "brainy one") is a genus of herbivorous ankylosaurid dinosaur from the late Cretaceous of Mongolia.

== Discovery and naming ==
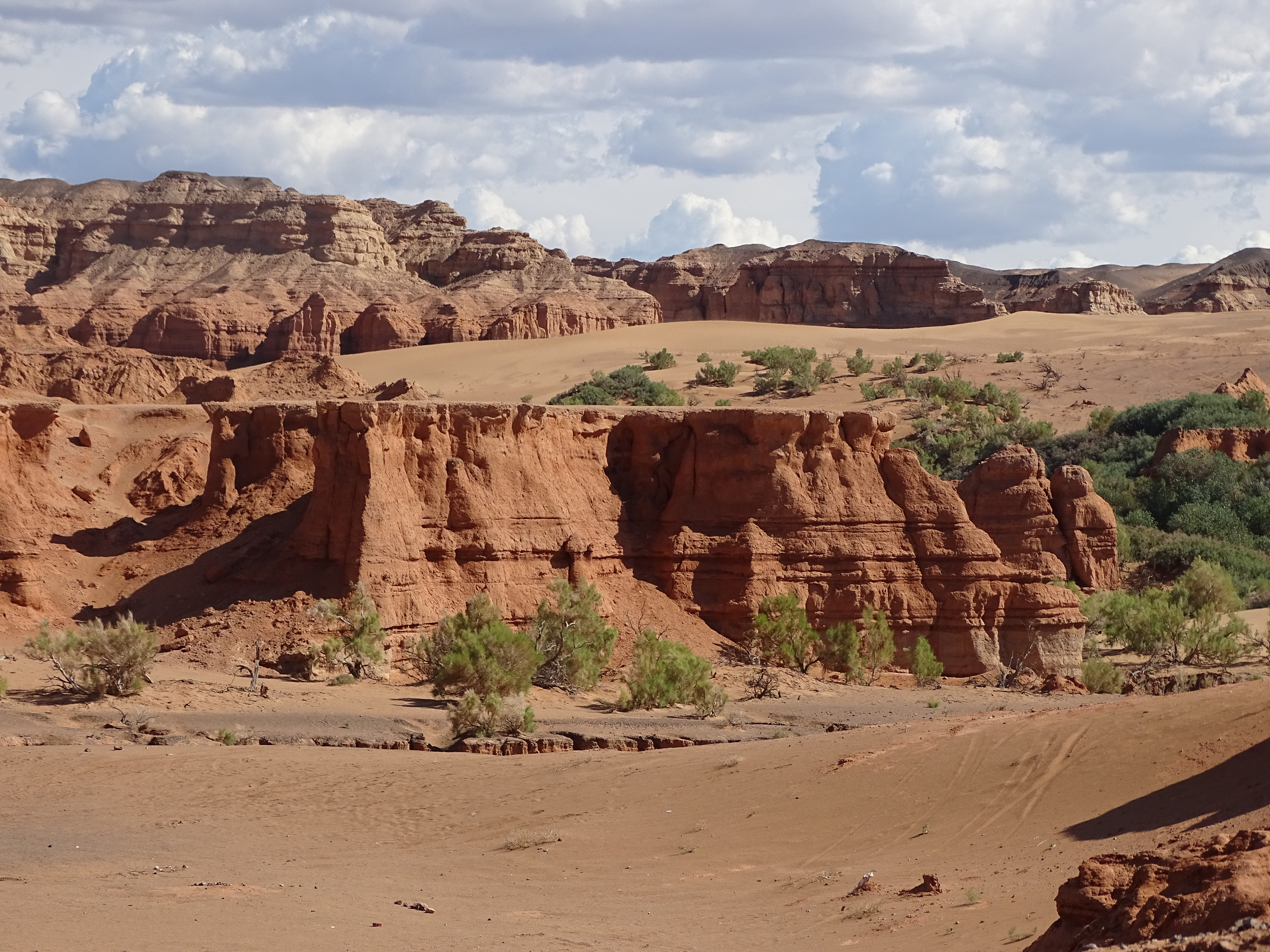
Barun Goyot Formation in Mongolia

In 1970, a Polish-Mongolian expedition discovered an ankylosaurian skull near Khulsan. In 1977, Teresa Maryańska named and described the type species Tarchia kielanae. The generic name is derived from Mongolian тархи (tarkhi, "brain") and Latin ~ia, in reference to a brain size presumed larger than that of the related form Saichania. The specific name honours Professor Zofia Kielan-Jaworowska, the leader of the expedition.

The holotype, ZPal MgD-I/111, was discovered in the Upper Cretaceous (possibly Campanian-Maastrichtian) Barun Goyot Formation (previously known as the 'Lower Nemegt Beds') of the Nemegt Basin of Mongolia. It consists of a skull roof, braincase and rear skull elements. Maryańska referred three additional specimens: ZPAL MgDI/43, a large postcranial skeleton containing three "free" tail vertebrae, twelve tail vertebrae of the "handle" of the tail club and a scute; ZPAL MgDI/49, a right humerus; and PIN 3142/251, a skeleton with skull, that as yet remains undescribed.

Tarchia is the geologically youngest of all known Asian ankylosaurid dinosaurs. In 1977, Tatyana Tumanova named a second species: Tarchia gigantea. This was a renaming of Dyoplosaurus giganteus Maleev 1956, which had been based on specimen PIN 551/29. In 1987, Tumanova concluded that both species were identical. This would make Dyoplosaurus giganteus the senior synonym of Tarchia kielanae. This was generally accepted and Tarchia gigantea became the usual species name, as a combinatio nova replacing Tarchia kielanae. However, recent study by Victoria Megan Arbour indicates that D. giganteus is indistinguishable from other ankylosaurs from the late Campanian-Maastrichtian of Mongolia, and hence a nomen dubium; the study revived the name Tarchia kielanae.

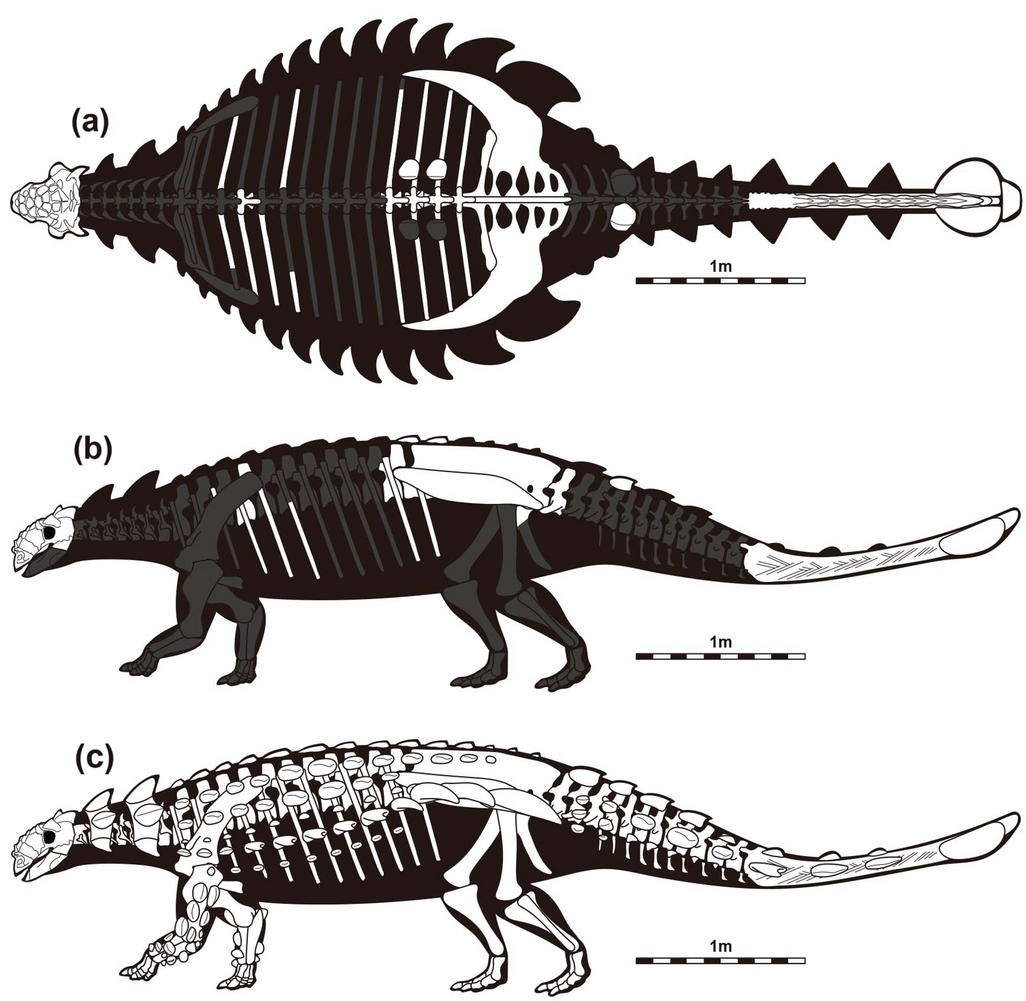
Skeletal diagram of T. tumanovae holotype

A rump with tail and club, specimen ZPAL MgD I/113, once referred to Dyoplosaurus giganteus and subsequently to Tarchia gigantea, was by Arbour seen as different from the D. giganteus holotype. The study by Arbour also concluded that specimen PIN 3142/250, in 1977 referred to Tarchia by Tumanova, probably belonged to Saichania instead. This would radically change the common image of Tarchia as this exemplar had been by far the best preserved and most illustrations, museum mounts and indeed scientific research had been based on it. Arbour discovered that the holotype of Tarchia shared distinguishing traits with that of Minotaurasaurus Miles & Miles 2009, concluding that the latter is a junior synonym of Tarchia.

Subsequently, in 2016, a study conducted by Paul Penkalski and Tatiana Tumanova indicated that PIN 3142/250 is not referable to Saichania due to significant anatomical differences, but instead represents a new species of Tarchia, T. teresae. The study also recognized Minotaurasaurus as a distinct genus. In 2021, Jin-Young Park and team named a new species of Tarchia, T. tumanovae, known from the holotype MPC-D 100/1353 which consists of a partial skeleton with associated skull. It was found in the Nemegt Formation at the Hermiin Tsav locality, making it coeval with T. teresae.

== Description ==
Tarchia was a medium-sized ankylosaur, measuring around 5.5–6 metres (18–20 ft) long and weighing up to 2.5–3 metric tons (2.8–3.3 short tons). If ZPAL MgD I/113 indeed belongs to the genus, it would have belonged to an individual measuring 5.8–6.7 metres (19–22 ft) long.

As an ankylosaurid, Tarchia would have had a broad, low-slung body, positioned on strong short legs. The body would have been protected by skin ossifications, named osteoderms. It probably had a bony tail club, for active defence against predators.

Tarchia had previously been distinguished from Saichania on the basis of its relatively larger basicranium, an unfused paroccipital process-quadrate contact and, based on PIN 3142/250, the fact that the premaxillary rostrum is wider than the maximum distance between the tooth rows in the maxillaries. In 2014, Arbour reported two distinguishing traits apart from those known exclusively from the holotype of Minotaurasaurus; the back of the head is visible in top view; and a deep groove runs along the front and outer side of the squamosal horn, and at the front it surrounds around an accessory osteoderm placed on the rear supraorbital, forming a deep furrow.

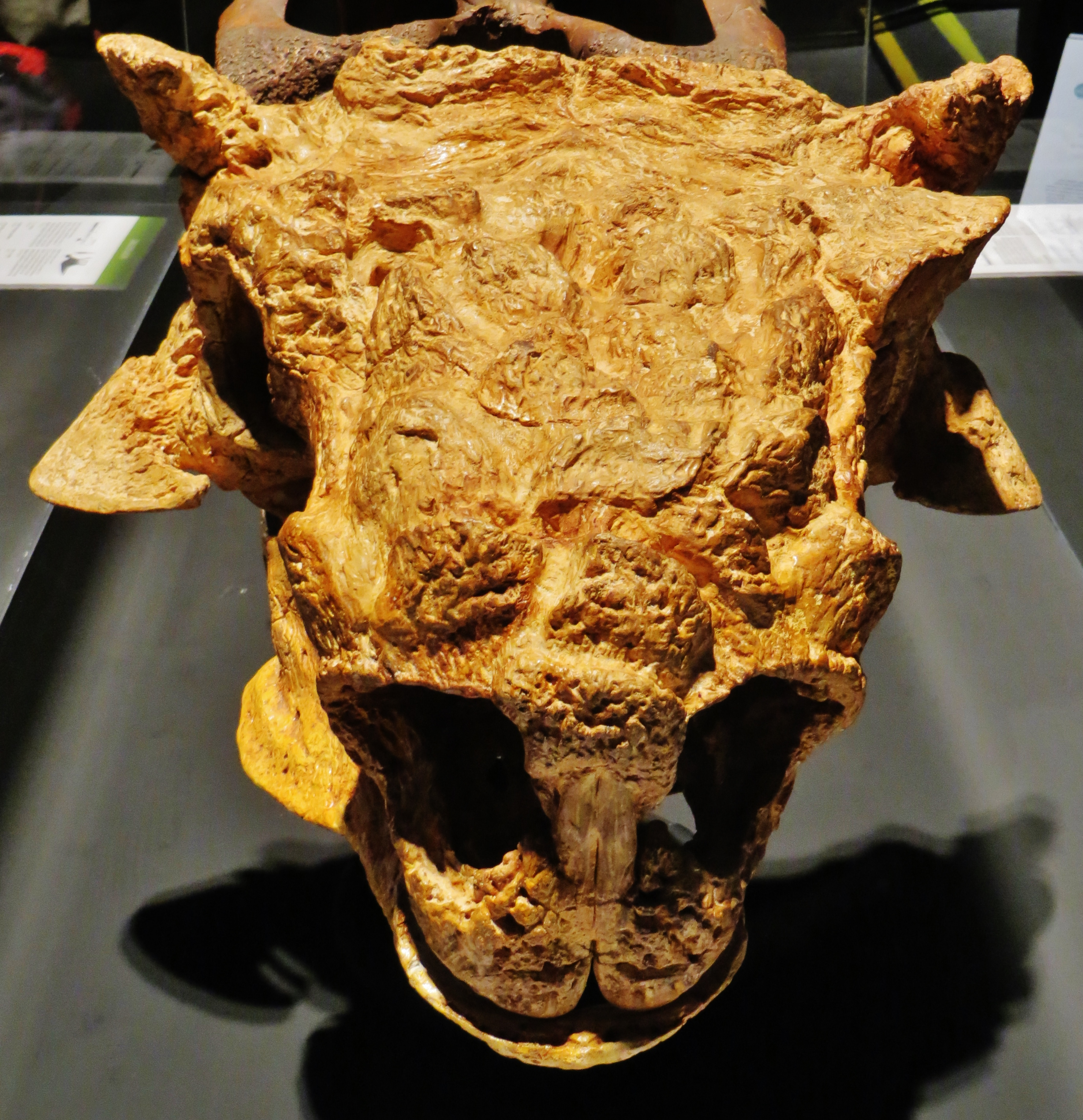
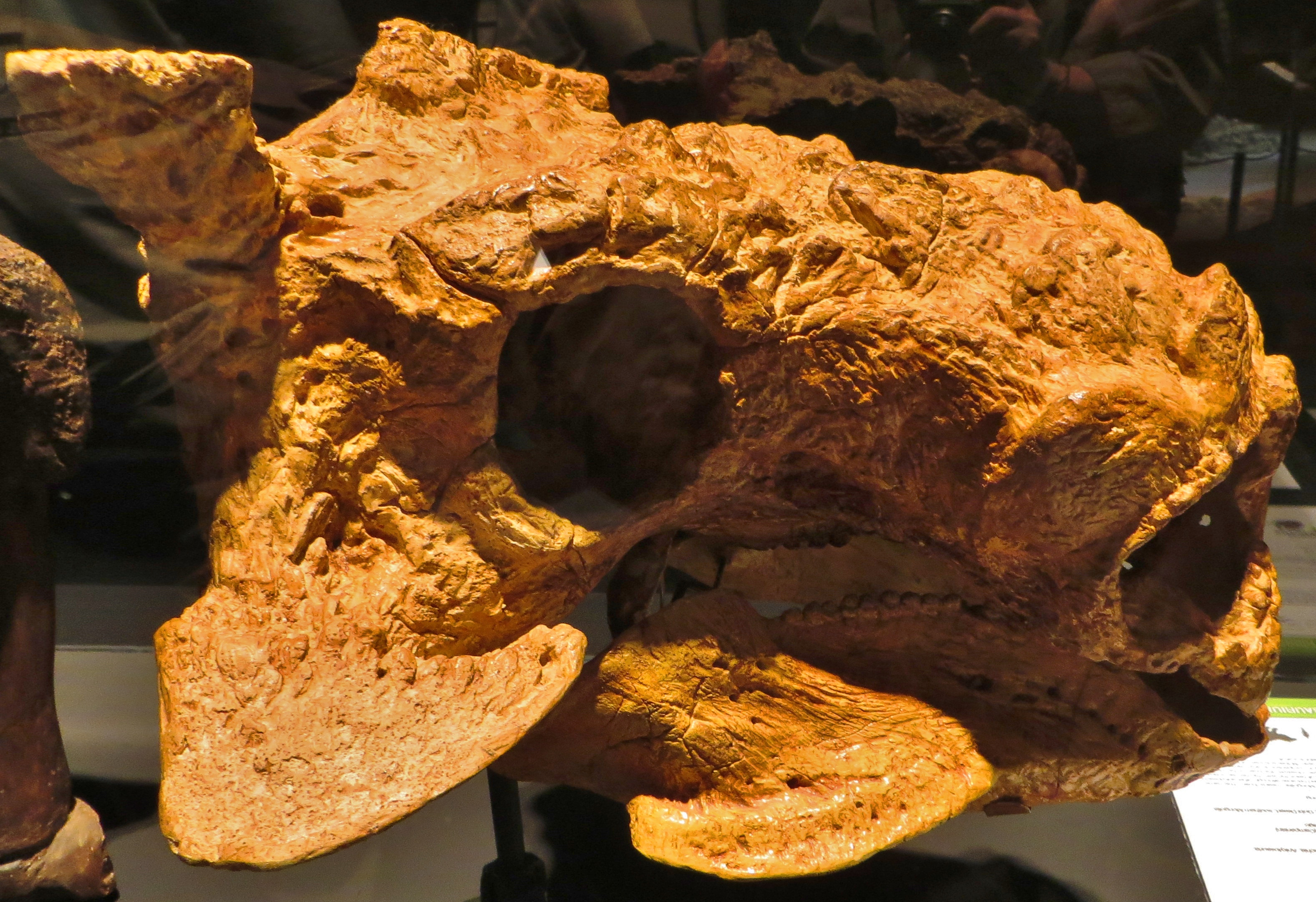
T. teresae skull
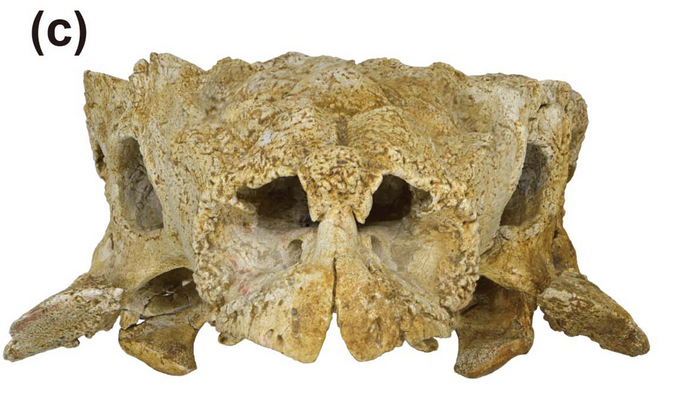
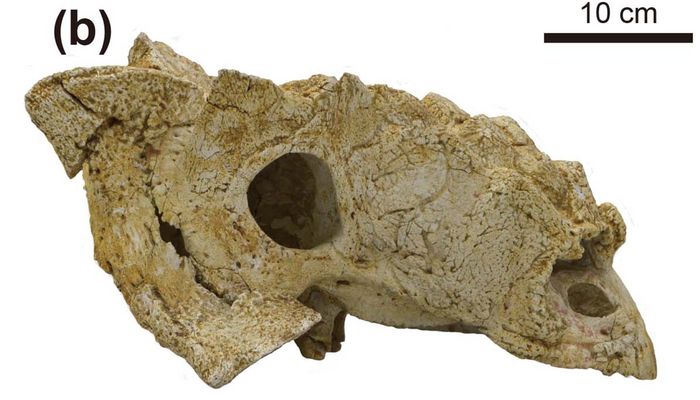
T. tumanovae skull

The 2016 redescription of Tarchia notes that it differs from Saichania in having a postorbital fossa (which separates the squamosal horn from the supraorbital) and an accessory osteoderm; the occiput being visible in dorsal view; the large, deep braincase; the foramen magnum being higher than it is wide; and the nuchal osteoderms being taller laterally than medially. In addition, it differs from both Saichania and Minotaurasaurus in that it lacks postocular caputegulae (or small, polygonal bony plates behind the orbit) and has a proportionally high occiput in caudal view. The study additionally found that PIN 3142/250 (i.e. T. teresae) can be distinguished from T. kielanae in that the accessory osteoderm is not fused to the roof of the skull, the quadrate and paroccipital process are not fused, the back of the skull roof is strongly sculptured, and the openings for the fourth to twelfth cranial nerves is bifurcated.

Much information given about Tarchia in older work refers to PIN 3142/250 (which was briefly referred to Saichania until it was named as T. teresae in 2016). In 2001, it was stated that, in Tarchia, wear facets indicative of tooth-to-tooth occlusion are present; this likely does not refer to the holotype specimen, since in the holotype no teeth are preserved.

== Phylogeny ==
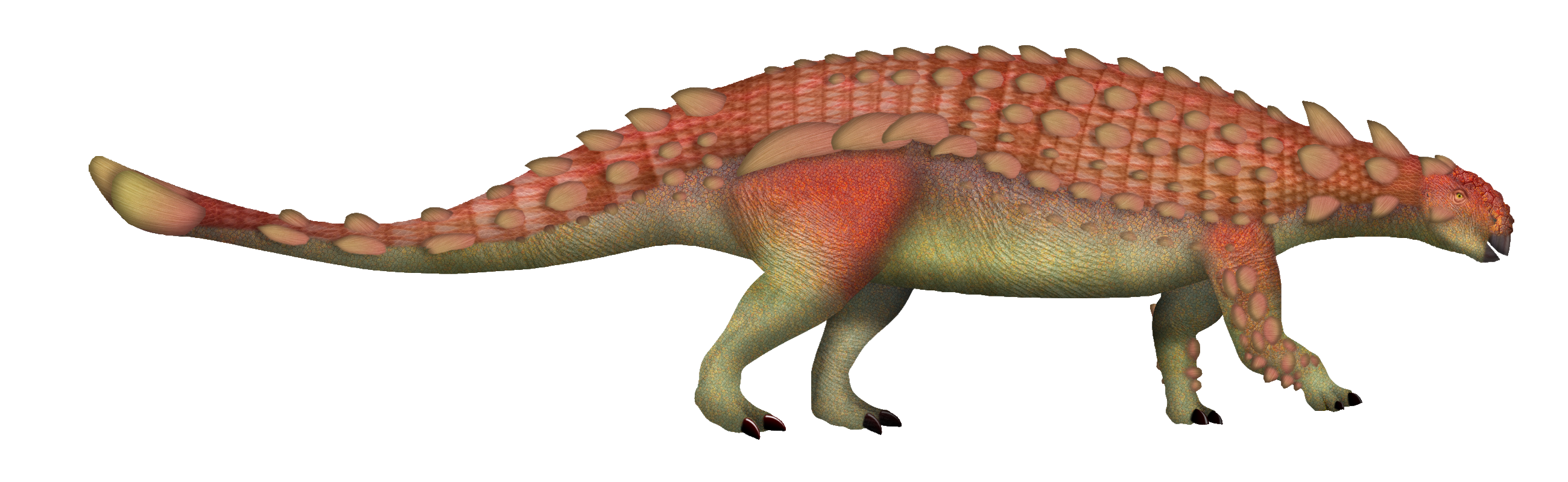
Life reconstruction

Vickaryous et al. in 2004 stated that Tarchia was basal to two distinct clades of Late Cretaceous ankylosaurids: one comprising North American taxa (Ankylosaurus, Euoplocephalus) and the other comprising Asian taxa (Pinacosaurus spp., Saichania, Tianzhenosaurus, Talarurus). However, this was again based on PIN 3142/250, the characters of which usually defined the operational taxonomic unit named Tarchia in the various cladistic analyses. Remarkably, Tarchia and Saichania nevertheless in these analyses often occupied very different positions.

The following cladogram is based on a 2015 phylogenetic analysis of the Ankylosaurinae conducted by Arbour and Currie:

- Ankylosaurinae
  - Crichtonpelta
  - - Tsagantegia
    - Zhejiangosaurus
    - Pinacosaurus
    - - - Saichania
        - - Tarchia
          - Zaraapelta
      - Ankylosaurini
        - Dyoplosaurus
        - - - Talarurus
            - Nodocephalosaurus
          - - - Ankylosaurus
              - Anodontosaurus
            - Euoplocephalus
            - - Scolosaurus
              - Ziapelta

A limited phylogenetic analysis conducted in the 2016 redescription of Tarchia, focusing on the interrelationships between Tarchia, Saichania, and Minotaurasaurus, is reproduced below.

- - Minotaurasaurus
  - - Zaraapelta
    - - Saichania
      - - T. kielanae
        - T. teresae
  - Pinacosaurus

== Palaeobiology ==
The rocks in which Tarchia fossils were found likely represent eolian dunes and interdune environments, with small intermittent lakes and seasonal streams.

=== Feeding ===
Tarchia was, like other Mongolian ankylosaurines, herbivorous and a low-level bulk feeder based on its sub-rectangular broad muzzle. Instead of oral processing, ankylosaurids living in dry environments such as Tarchia may have relied more on hindgut fermentation for digestion or, alternatively, consumed succulent plants that did not require complex chewing. These ankylosaurids may have also been restricted to simple orthal pulping and might have had to deal with more grit during feeding compared to ankylosaurs that lived in tropical to subtropical climates, as indicated by the microwear pits. Park et al. (2021) suggested that there was a shift from bulk feeding to selective feeding in Mongolian ankylosaurines during the Campanian and Maastrichtian stages which may have either been caused by the change in habitat, as the climate changed from semi-arid and arid to humid, or interspecific competition with saurolophine hadrosaurids that immigrated from North America to Central Asia during the Campanian stage.

=== Pathology ===
One skull of Tarchia shows tooth marks identified as belonging to the tyrannosaurid, Tarbosaurus, indicating the theropod hunted the ankylosaurid.

== See also ==
- Timeline of ankylosaur research
- 2017 in archosaur paleontology
