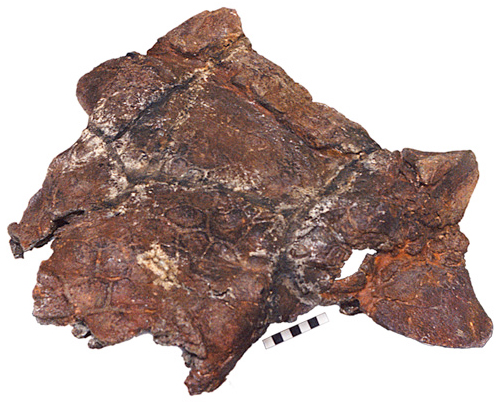
- Skull of the holotype, MOR 433

Scientific classification
- Kingdom: Animalia
- Phylum: Chordata
- Class: Reptilia
- Clade: Dinosauria
- Clade: †Ornithischia
- Clade: †Thyreophora
- Clade: †Ankylosauria
- Family: †Ankylosauridae
- Subfamily: †Ankylosaurinae
- Tribe: †Ankylosaurini
- Genus: †Oohkotokia; Penkalski, 2013

Type species
- †Oohkotokia horneri Penkalski, 2013

= Oohkotokia =

Oohkotokia Temporal range: Late Cretaceous, 74 Ma

Extinct genus of dinosaurs

Oohkotokia (/ˌoʊ.oʊkəˈtoʊkiə/ OH-oh-kə-TOH-kee-ə) is a genus of ankylosaurid dinosaur within the subfamily Ankylosaurinae. It is known from the upper levels of the Two Medicine Formation (late Campanian stage, about 74 Ma ago) of Montana, United States. The discovery of Oohkotokia supports that Ankylosaurine dinosaurs existed and flourished continuously in Montana and/or Alberta throughout the late Campanian and early Maastrichtian stages in the Late Cretaceous period. It was a large, heavily built, quadrupedal, herbivore, that could grow up to 5 metres (16 ft) long and weigh up to 2 metric tons (2.2 short tons).

== Discovery and naming ==
The generic name, Oohkotokia, is derived from the Blackfoot animate noun "ooh'kotoka", meaning "large stone" and the Latin suffix "ia" meaning "derived from"; thus "child of stone", which is a reference to its extensive body armor. The generic name also honors the Blackfoot people, on whose land the specimen was found. The specific name, O. horneri, refers to John R. Horner of the Museum of the Rockies, who collected the type specimen. Oohkotokia contains a single type species, Oohkotokia horneri, named and described in 2013 by Paul Penkalski. Penkalski described this genus after finding it in the collection of Montana's Museum of the Rockies where it had been stored for more than three decades.

== Description ==
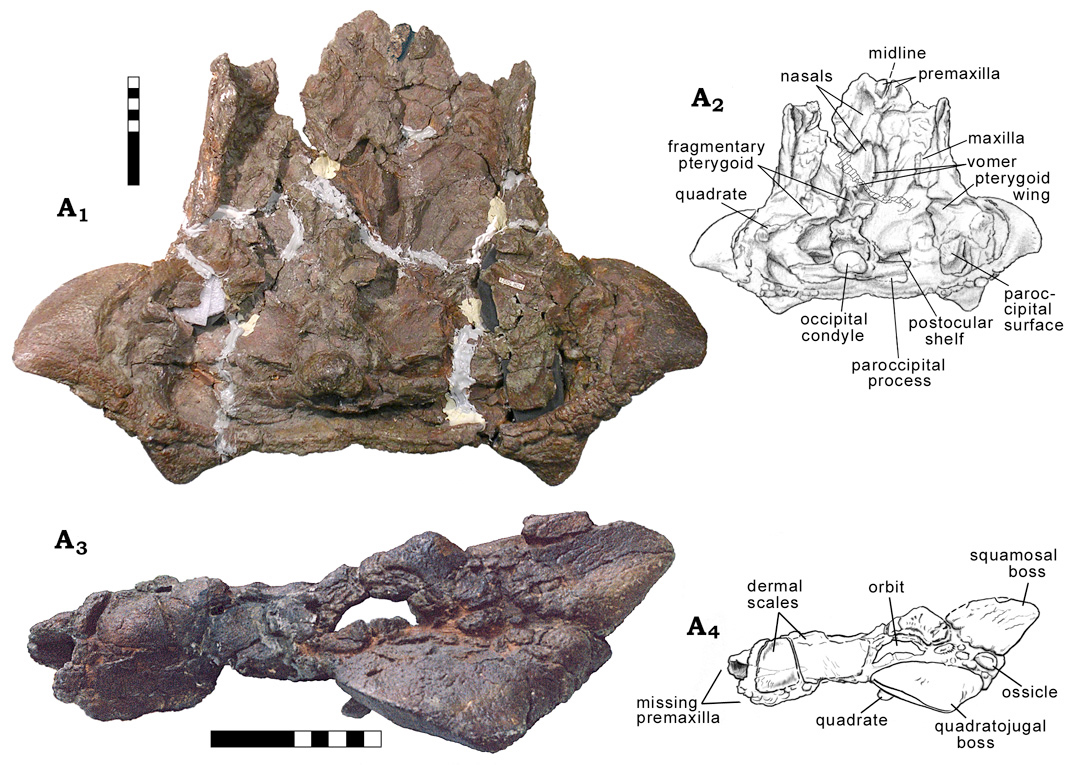
Skull of MOR 433 from below and in profile

The holotype of Oohkotokia, MOR 433 consists of a crushed but rather well preserved skull that measured 375 mm, axial material, a partial scapula, several thin-walled osteoderms, cervical armour, a very large humerus, and other fragments. Estimates suggest that Oohkotokia was at best 5 metres (16 ft) long and weighed 2 metric tons (2.2 short tons) at most. The skull of this genus bears great similarity to skulls that have been referred to Euoplocephalus, but is significant because it has a relatively smooth overall surface texture when compared to the skulls of most other ankylosaurids from the same time period.

=== Referred specimens ===
- Specimen MOR 363, which consists of fragmentary skull with supraorbital and quadratojugal bosses identical to those observed in holotype MOR 433, which was also found in the Two Medicine Formation, was referred to Oohkotokia.
- Specimen NSM PV 20381, which was collected in 1995 but not described, and includes an incomplete skull, a pelvic bone, one keeled osteoderm, forelimbs, and hindlimbs without feet. This specimen was once thought to belong to Euoplocephalus.
- Specimen TMP 2001.42.19, from the Two Medicine Formation, included a partial skull without teeth, squamosal horns, a distal humerus, osteoderms, a left scapulocoracoid, both ischia, and a complete and well preserved "tail club", which is average-sized - approximately 320 mm wide.
- Specimen MOR 538, a partial tail club similar to that of TMP 2001.42.19.
- Specimen USNM 7943, a partial cervical half-ring found in 1917 near the locality in Montana where the holotype of Brachyceratops montanensis was discovered.
- Specimen USNM 11892, a partial skull with five teeth first described and referred to Dyoplosaurus by Gilmore in 1930. This specimen has very large squamosal horns and teeth with shelf-like labial cingula and unique Z-shaped carinae in occlusal view.

=== Tail ===
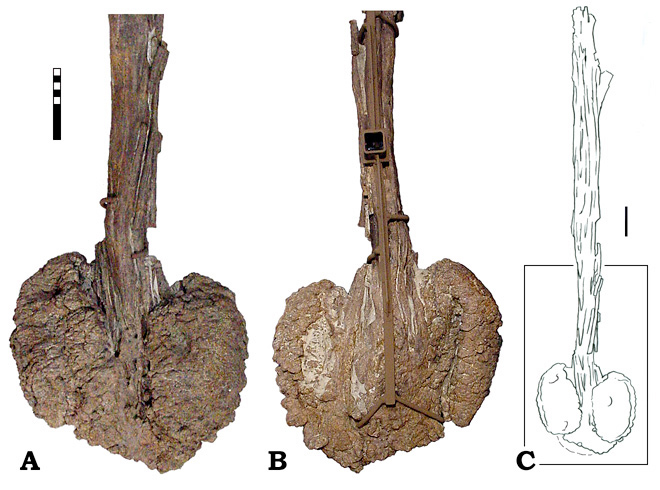
Referred tail club, TMP 2001.42.19

Like other ankylosaurids, Oohkotokia had an enlarged mass of bone forming a "club" on the end of its tail, made of two enlarged bone lumps. The presence of this type of tail club separates ankylosaurids like Oohkotokia from its close relatives the nodosaurids, who do not have this tail feature. Its tail club was made of several plates of bone, permeated by soft tissue, which allowed the absorption of thousands of pounds of force. The large clubs at the end of their tails may have been used in self-defense, by swinging the club at predators or rivals, or in sexual selection.

== Classification ==
Penkalski (2013) assigned this genus to Ankylosaurinae based on anatomical features present in the skull and the morphology of its body armor. There was sufficient morphological detail to conclude that Oohkotokia is a different animal than its relatives, Euoplocephalus tutus, Dyoplosaurus acutosquameus, and Scolosaurus cutleri.

Arbour and Currie (2013) found that Oohkotokia shares diagnostic features with Scolosaurus, including cervical half ring morphology and squamosal horn shape. They also noted that the rostrum is broken in all specimens referred to Oohkotokia (with some being reconstructed) and therefore the nasal plate morphology does not provide strong evidence for the separation of Oohkotokia. They concluded that Oohkotokia is a junior synonym of Scolosaurus.

=== Distinguishing anatomical features ===
A diagnosis is a statement of the anatomical features of an organism (or group) that collectively distinguish it from all other organisms. Some, but not all, of the features in a diagnosis are also autapomorphies. An autapomorphy is a distinctive anatomical feature that is unique to a given organism or group.

According to Penkalski (2013), Oohkotokia can be distinguished based on the following characteristics:

- The median, middle, plate on the nasal area of the skull roof is small and is not distinguished from surrounding osteoderms
- On the rear of the skull the squamosal bosses are prominent, horn-like, and "trihedral"
- The keel on the squamosal boss is flat rostrally. on the front side, grading into a blunt keel dorsally, on top; and the caudal, rear, surface of squamosal boss is flat to gently rounded and is unkeeled
- The quadratojugal bosses on the cheek are broad and smooth with strong caudal curvature
- The apex of the quadratojugal boss is rounded and unkeeled, and is situated caudally;
- The transverse nuchal crest on the rear skull roof is not visible in lateral, side, view
- The occipital condyle is small, approximately 16% of basal skull length
- The orbit, eye socket, is relatively large
- The rump osteoderms are basally excavated with a smooth, weakly ornamented external surface texture; and steeply pitched, triangular caudal, tail, osteoderms are present

== Paleoecology ==
=== Provenance and occurrence ===
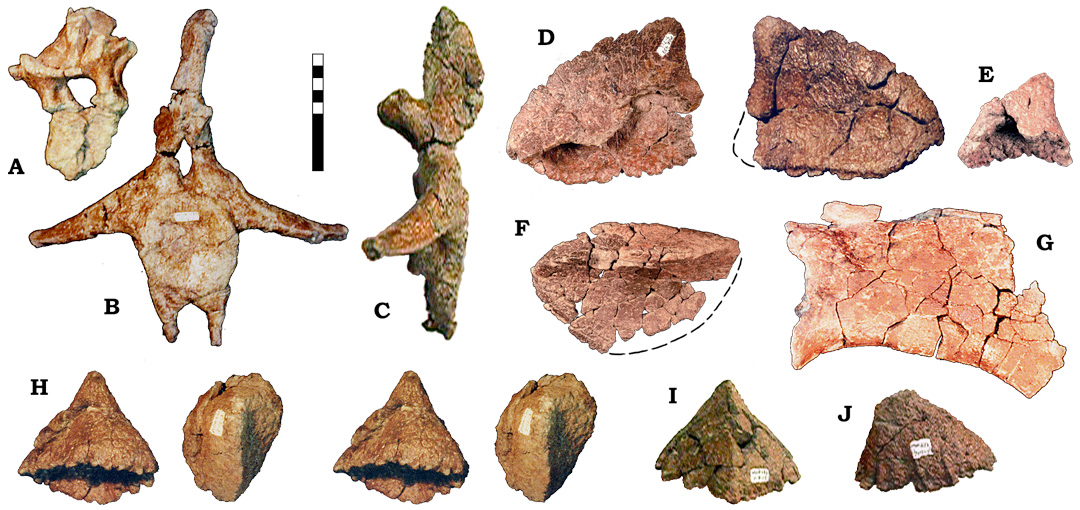
Postcranial material of the holotype

The remains of Oohkotokia, MOR 433 were recovered in the Upper Member of the Two Medicine Formation, in Montana, which radiometric dating has shown to be approximately 74 million years old. The remains were collected in 1986–1987 in grey siltstone that was deposited during the Campanian stage of the Cretaceous period. The specimen is housed in the collection of the Museum of the Rockies in Bozeman, Montana.

=== Fauna and habitat ===
Studies suggest that the paleoenvironment of the Two Medicine Formation featured a seasonal, semi-arid climate with possible rainshadows from the Cordilleran highlands. Lithologies, invertebrate faunas, and plant and pollen data suggest that during the Campanian, this region experienced a long dry season and warm temperatures. The extensive red beds and caliche horizons of the upper Two Medicine are evidence of at least seasonally arid conditions.

The Two Medicine Formation has produced the remains of oviraptorosaurs, ornithopods, the nodosaur Edmontonia, the ceratopsians Achelousaurus, Brachyceratops, Cerasinops, and Einiosaurus among others, Troodon, the dromaeosaurids Bambiraptor, Dromaeosaurus and Saurornitholestes, and the tyrannosauroids Albertosaurus, Daspletosaurus and Gorgosaurus. These dinosaurs and Oohkotokia shared the same ancient paleoenvironment with freshwater bivalves, gastropods, turtles, lizards, and champsosaurs. Some of the dinosaurs from this formation have been speculated to have shown signs of drought related death. The Upper Two Medicine Formation is particular significant for discoveries of a range of ontogenetic stages in dinosaurs, which has included hadrosaur nests with eggs and hatchlings, and Troodon eggs with intact embryos.

== Taphonomy ==
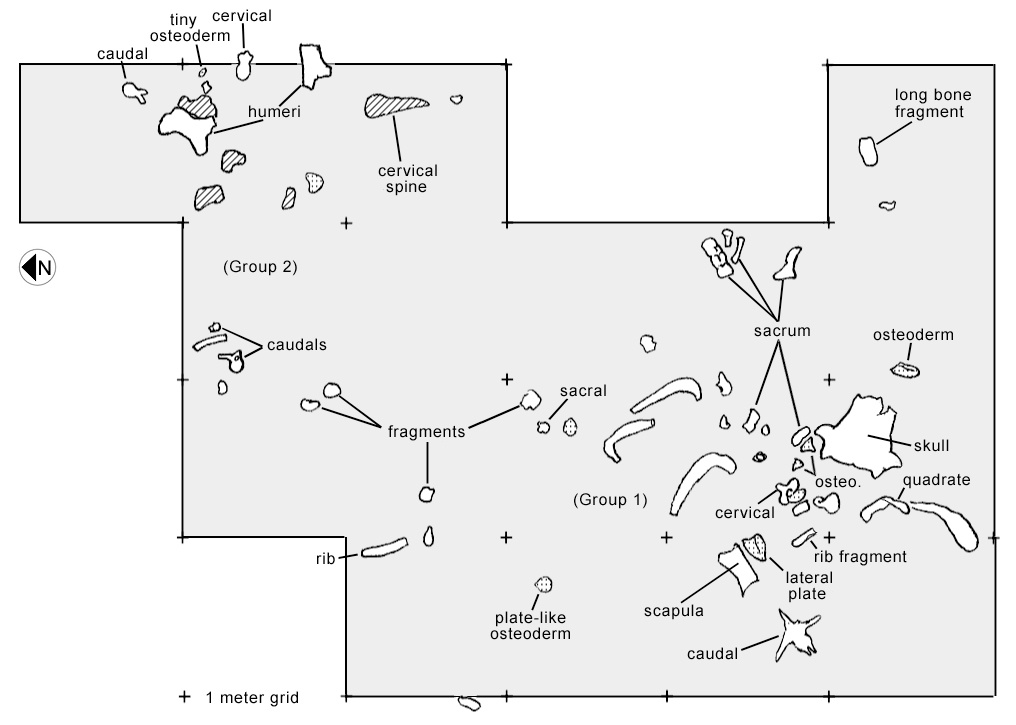
Quarry map of the holotype in situ

The skull of Oohkotokia, specimen MOR 433 is crushed but is overall reasonably well preserved on its dorsal and lateral surfaces, but its midline is offset to the animal's left side. The premaxillary beak is missing and most of the palate has eroded away. The crushing suggests that it was the result of dinoturbation, which is the trampling of soils, sediments and bones by passing dinosaurs. A roughly triangular area is present around which the bones of the skull have been splayed outward, as if the skull was stepped on prior to fossilization. The alveolar borders of the maxillae were eroded and no teeth were preserved. The recovered fossil material ranges from red to grey, but the coloration is not thought to bear any taphonomic significance, and the variation most likely arose from differential weathering.

== See also ==
- Timeline of ankylosaur research
