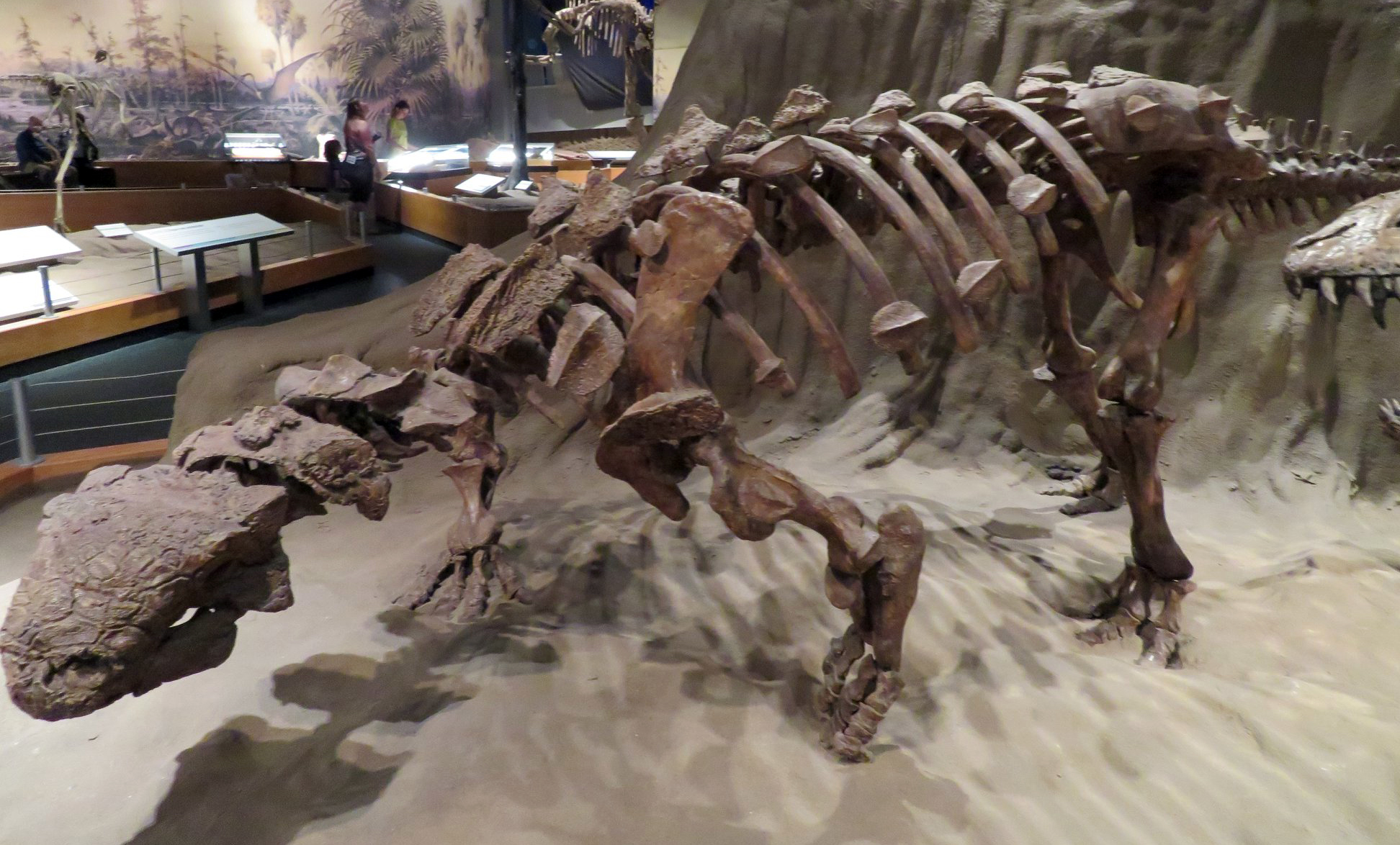
- Skeletal mount of the S. thronus holotype at the Royal Tyrell Museum

Scientific classification
- Kingdom: Animalia
- Phylum: Chordata
- Class: Reptilia
- Clade: Dinosauria
- Clade: †Ornithischia
- Clade: †Thyreophora
- Clade: †Ankylosauria
- Family: †Ankylosauridae
- Subfamily: †Ankylosaurinae
- Tribe: †Ankylosaurini
- Genus: †Scolosaurus; Nopcsa, 1928

Type species
- †Scolosaurus cutleri Nopcsa, 1928

Other species
- †S. thronus Penkalski, 2018

Synonyms
- Oohkotokia? Penkalski, 2013

= Scolosaurus =

Scolosaurus Temporal range: Late Cretaceous, 76.5–74 Ma

Extinct genus of dinosaurs

Scolosaurus is an extinct genus of ankylosaurid dinosaurs within the subfamily Ankylosaurinae. It is known from the lower levels of the Dinosaur Park Formation and upper levels of the Oldman Formation in the Late Cretaceous (latest middle Campanian stage, about 76.5 Ma ago) of Alberta, Canada. The genus contains two species, S. cutleri and S. thronus. The type species, S. cutleri, measured up to 5.6 metres (18 ft) in length and 2.2 metric tons (2.4 short tons) in body mass.

The genus was once believed to represent a synonym of the coeval Euoplocephalus, but this is no longer thought to be the case, and Scolosaurus is now accepted as a valid taxon. Some researchers have considered the genus Oohkotokia, known from the also Campanian-aged Two Medicine Formation of Montana, United States, to be synonymous with Scolosaurus.

== Discovery ==
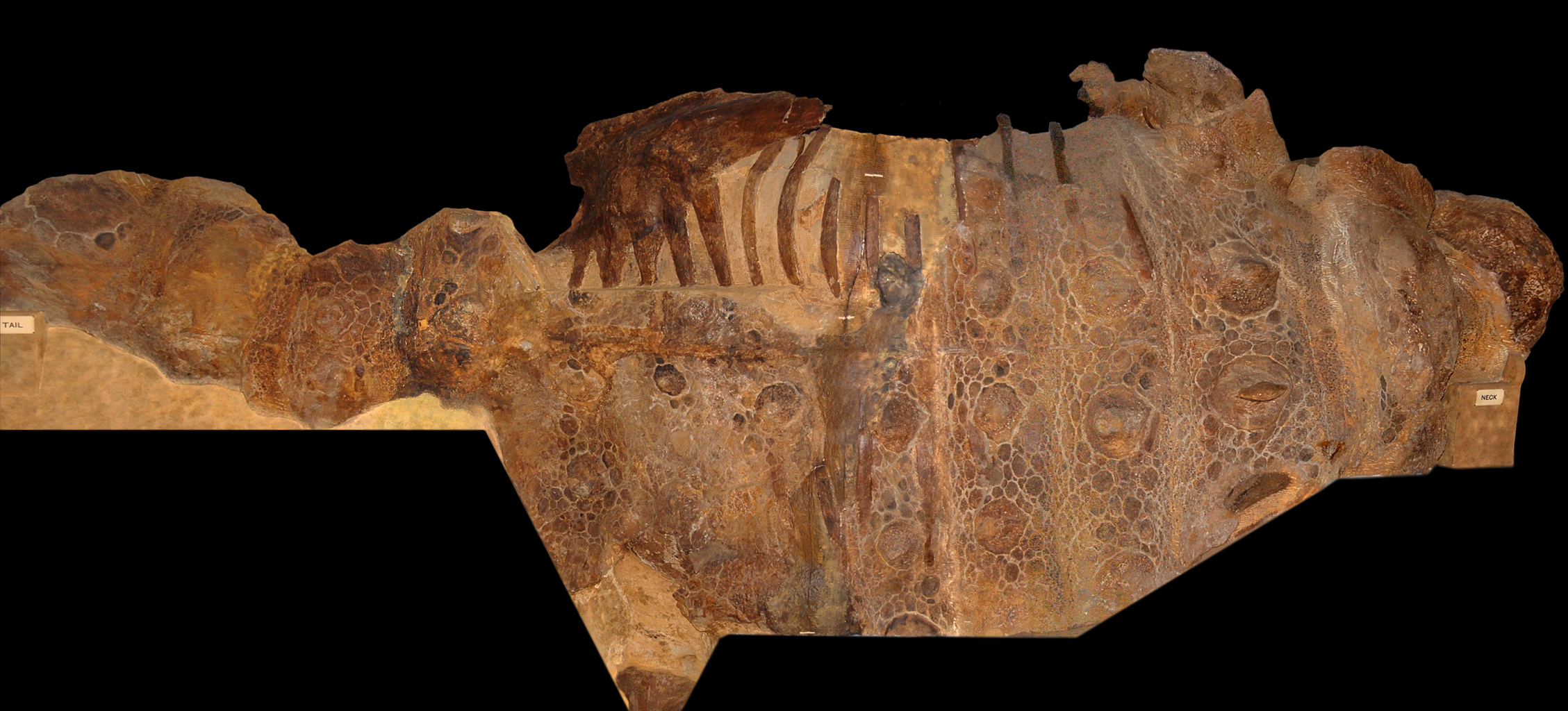
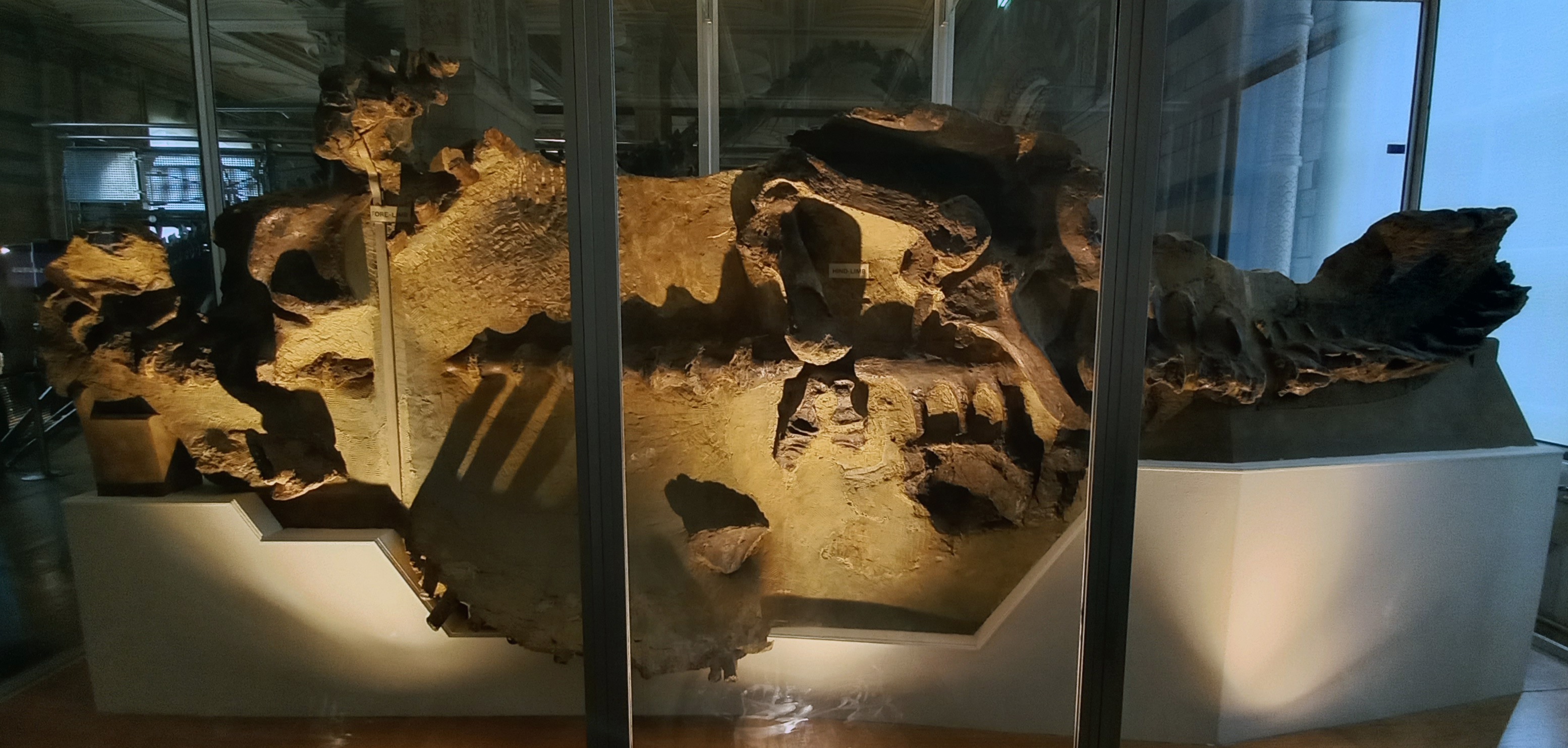
S. cutleri holotype specimen NHMUK PV R5161 from above and below at Natural History Museum, London

Scolosaurus was named by Franz Nopcsa von Felső-Szilvás in 1928, based on holotype NHMUK PV R.5161, a nearly complete specimen that preserves the entire skeleton except for the distal end of the tail, the right forelimb, the right hindlimb, and the skull. The rare preservation of osteoderms and skin impression are also present. The fossil skeleton was discovered by William Edmund Cutler, an independent fossil collector in 1914 at Quarry 80 of the Deadlodge Canyon locality. It was collected from the bottom of the Dinosaur Park Formation in fine-grained sandstone and fine-grained claystone sediments that were deposited during the Campanian stage of the Late Cretaceous period, approximately 76.5 million years ago. The holotype specimen is housed in the collection of the Natural History Museum in London, England.

In 2013, Arbour and Currie reassigned specimen MOR 433, upon which the genus Oohkotokia was based, to Scolosaurus. This specimen consists of a partial skull, both humeri, a caudal vertebra and several osteoderms and was recovered in the Upper Member of the Two Medicine Formation, in Montana, which has been dated at approximately 74 million years. The remains were collected in 1986-1987 in grey siltstone that was deposited during the Campanian stage of the Cretaceous period. The specimen is housed in the collection of the Museum of the Rockies in Bozeman, Montana.

The generic name Scolosaurus means "pointed stake lizard" and is derived from the Greek words skolos (σκῶλος) meaning "pointed stake", and saûros (σαύρα) meaning "lizard". The specific name, cutleri, honours its discoverer and the collector of the holotype, W. E. Cutler, who was seriously injured when the specimen fell on him as he was excavating it.

== Classification ==
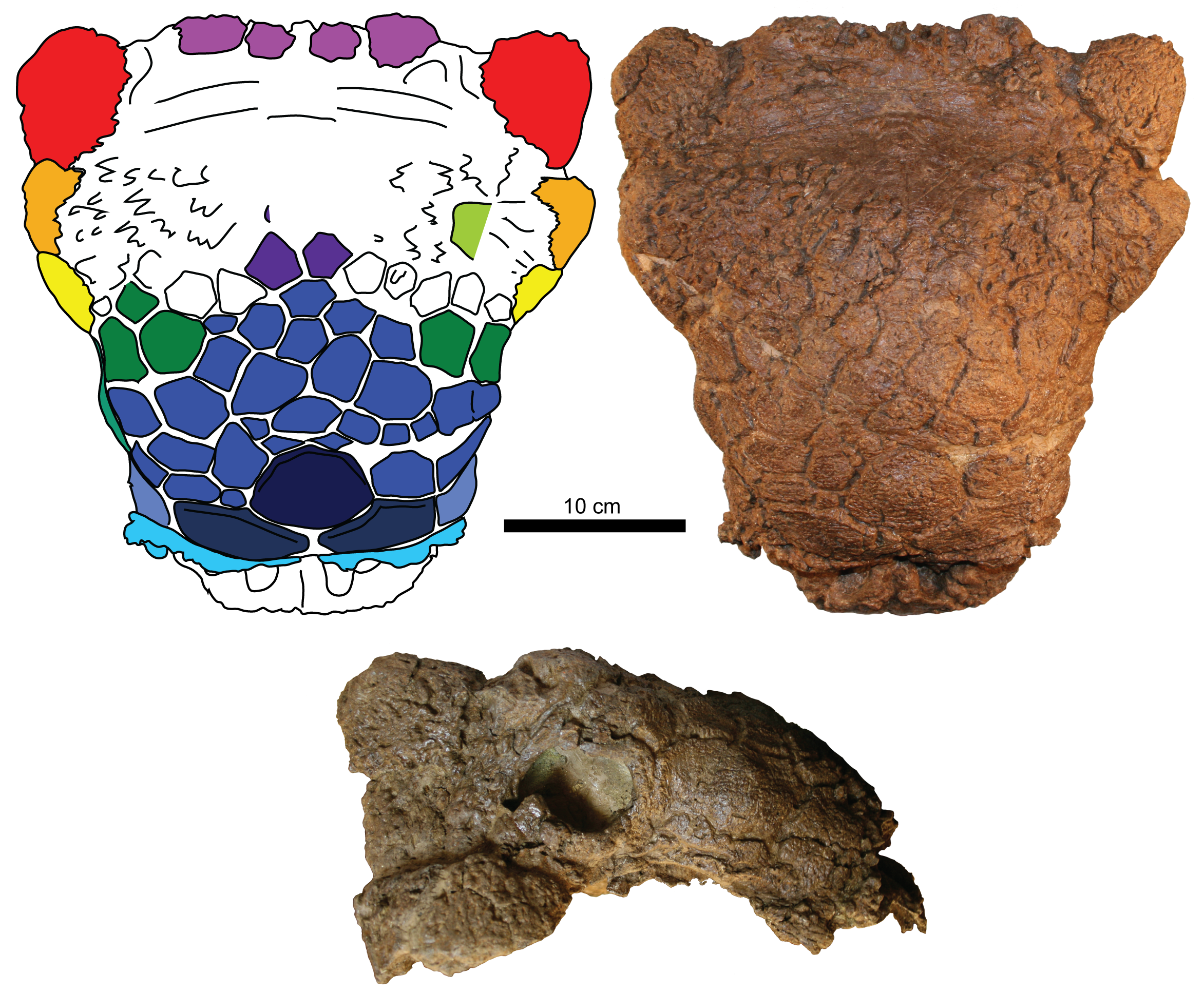
Skull of S. thronus holotype ROM 1930

In 1928, Nopcsa assigned the specimen to the family Ankylosauridae, and drew morphological comparisons with the fossil material known from Dyoplosaurus. In 1971, Walter Coombs concluded that there was only one species of ankylosaurid during the Campanian age of the Late Cretaceous of North America. He synonymized the species Anodontosaurus lambei, Dyoplosaurus acutosquameus, and Scolosaurus cutleri with Euoplocephalus tutus but did not provide any justification for these synonymies. The synonymization of Scolosaurus cutleri and Euoplocephalus tutus was generally accepted and thus NHMUK R.5161 was assigned to E. tutus. However, a redescription of Scolosaurus published in 2013 in the Canadian Journal of Earth Sciences by Paul Penkalski and William T. Blows suggested that the genus is a valid taxon. They concluded that Scolosaurus can be distinguished from Euoplocephalus by the form of their cervical armour, the details of other armour and the structure of the forelimb. They also concluded that Scolosaurus and Dyoplosaurus are distinct, due to differences noted in the pelvis and armour. Due to its completeness, the holotype of Scolosaurus has formed the basis for most Euoplocephalus reconstructions since 1971; therefore, most images of Euoplocephalus actually depict Scolosaurus instead.

A 2013 study found that the ankylosaurine Oohkotokia was indistinguishable from Scolosaurus, and was therefore considered a junior synonym. However, this synonymization is contentious as Oohkotokia was subsequently recognized as valid. Thus, much of the material illustrated as belonging to Scolosaurus may actually pertain to Oohkotokia.

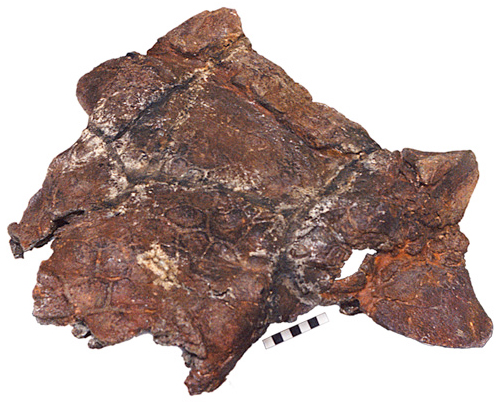
Skull MOR 433 of Oohkotokia, a possible junior synonym

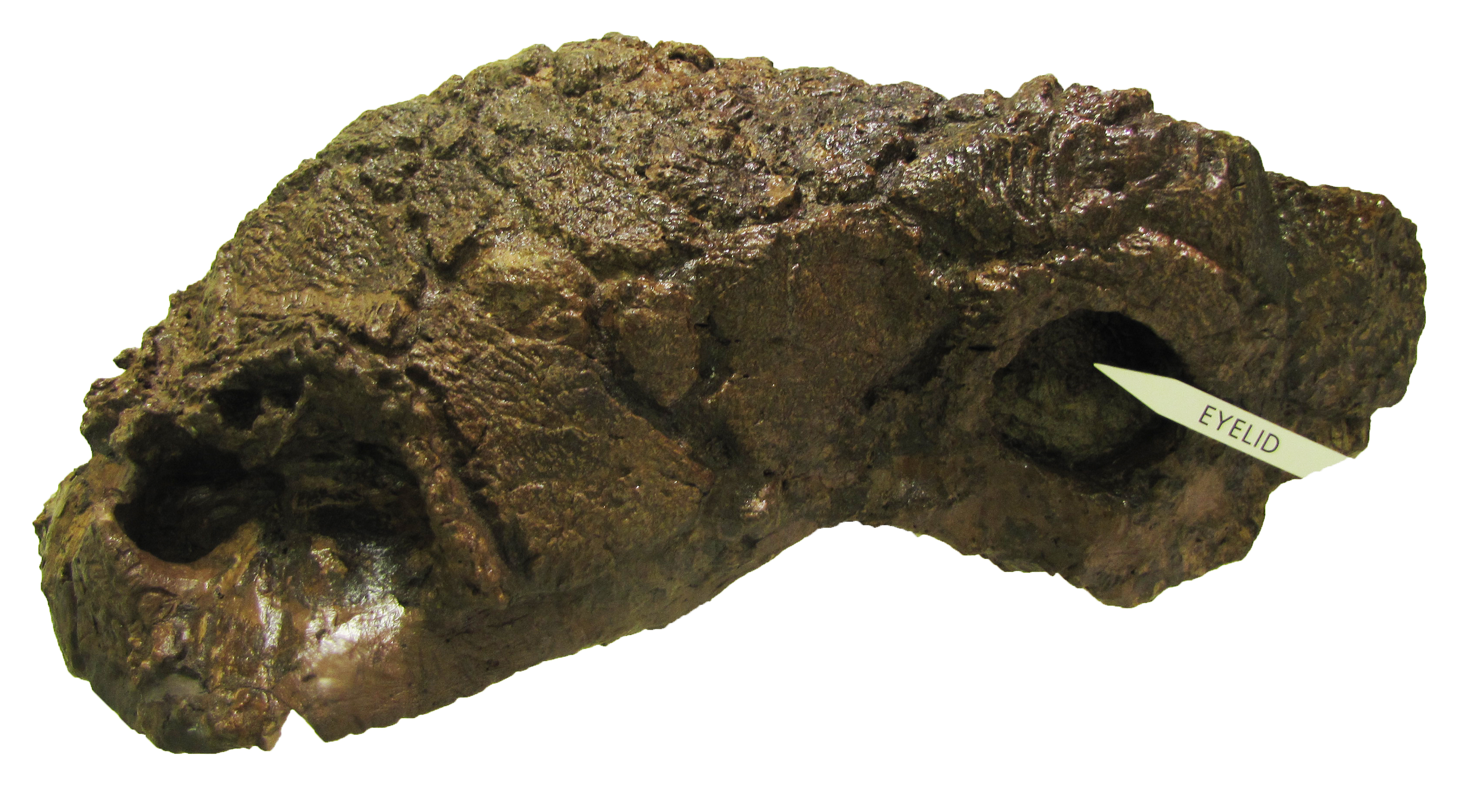
Referred S. cutleri skull, AMNH 5404

The following cladogram is based on a 2015 phylogenetic analysis of the Ankylosaurinae conducted by Victoria Arbour and Phillip J. Currie. The cladogram follows the biogeographical family tree provided by that study, which is a fusion of the study's 50% majority rule tree as well as the maximum agreement subtree. The study's 50% majority rule tree was a cladogram formed by a collection of clades, although it only included clades that appear in more than 50% of the family trees found during the analysis. The maximum agreement subtree is the cladogram that results from an algorithm which attempts to maximize the amount of taxa included in the result while also retaining the fundamental shape of all other trees in the sample. Some controversial taxa thus had to be omitted by the subtree in order for the resulting cladogram to fulfill the second requirement. The biogeographical tree (i.e. the following cladogram) is basically the 50% majority rule tree, except with some of the polytomies resolved according to the results of the maximum agreement subtree:

- Ankylosaurinae
  - Crichtonpelta
  - - Tsagantegia
    - Zhejiangosaurus
    - Pinacosaurus
    - - - Saichania
        - - Tarchia
          - Zaraapelta
      - Ankylosaurini
        - Dyoplosaurus
        - - - Talarurus
            - Nodocephalosaurus
          - - - Ankylosaurus
              - Anodontosaurus
            - Euoplocephalus
            - - Scolosaurus
              - Ziapelta

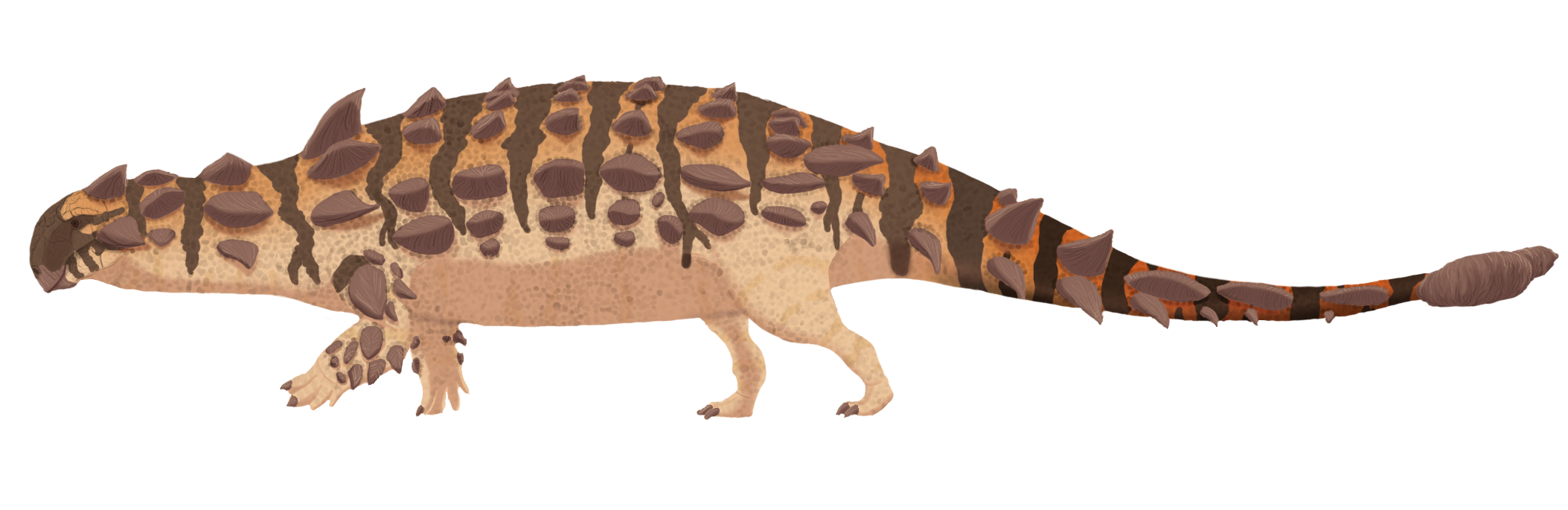
Life reconstruction of Scolosaurus cutleri

The following cladogram is based on a 2017 phylogenetic analysis of the Ankylosaurinae conducted by Victoria Arbour and David Evans. The cladogram depicts the majority rule (average result) of 10 most parsimonious trees, which each are considered to have the fewest evolutionary steps, thus being the most accurate under the principle of Occam's razor:

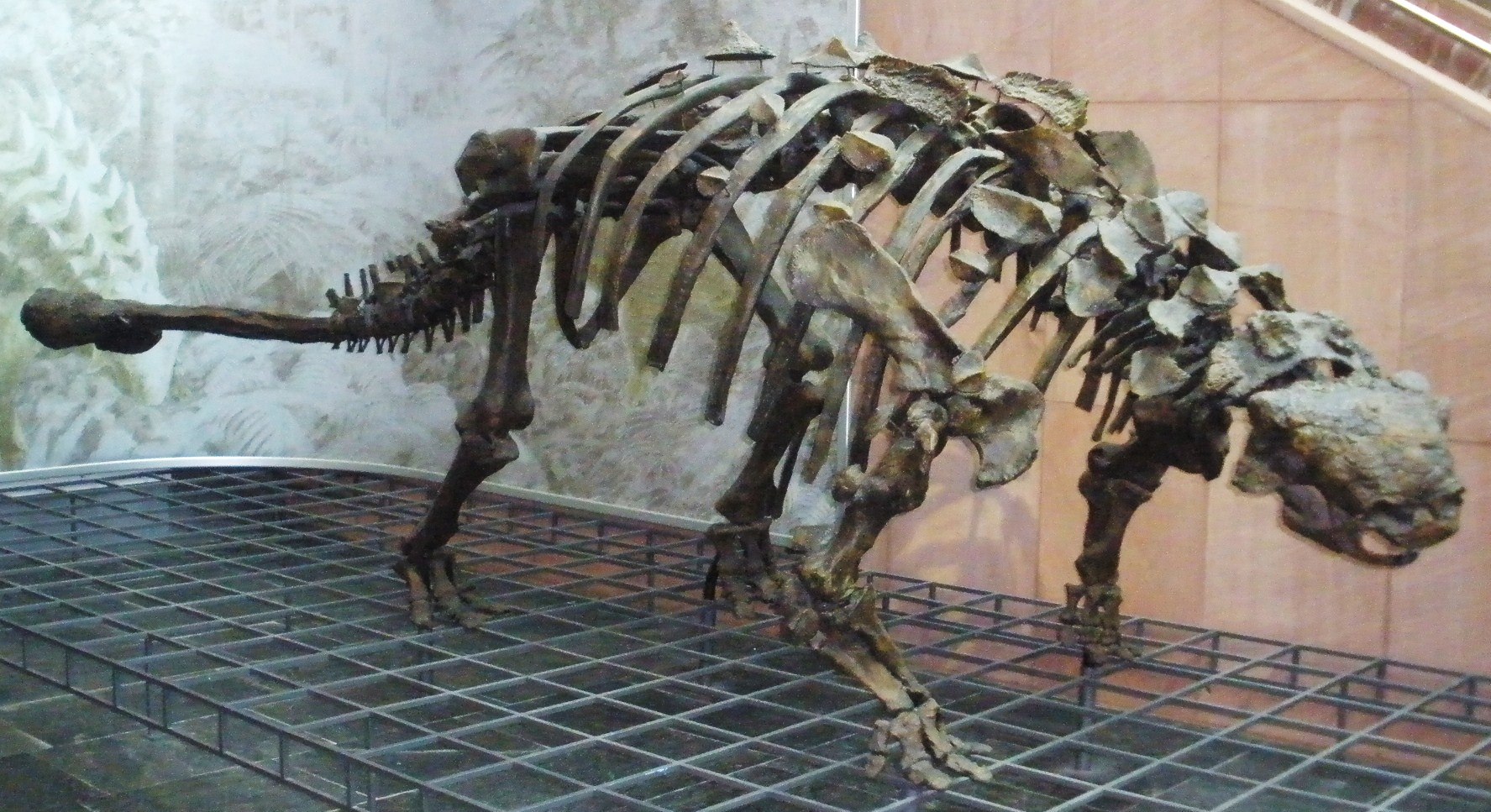
Reconstructed skeleton based on S. thronus holotype specimen ROM 1930

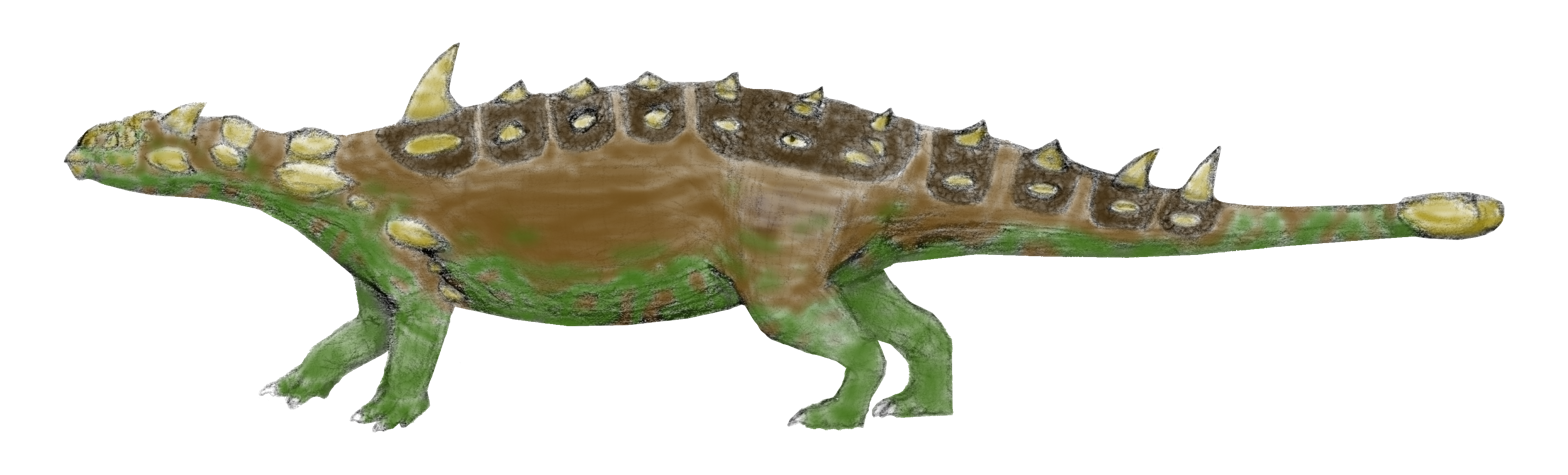
Life restoration of Scolosaurus cutleri. Proportions based on Paul (2016)

- Ankylosaurinae
  - Zhejiangosaurus luoyangensis
  - - - Pinacosaurus grangeri
      - Pinacosaurus mephistocephalus
    - - - Tsagantegia longicranialis
        - - Talarurus plicatospineus
          - Nodocephalosaurus kirtlandensis
      - - - Saichania chulsanensis
          - - Zaraapelta nomadis
            - Tarchia kielanae
        - Ankylosaurini
          - Ziapelta sanjuanensis
          - Euoplocephalus tutus
          - - Zuul crurivastator
            - Scolosaurus cutleri
            - Dyoplosaurus acutosquameus
            - Anodontosaurus lambei
            - Ankylosaurus magniventris

=== Referred material ===
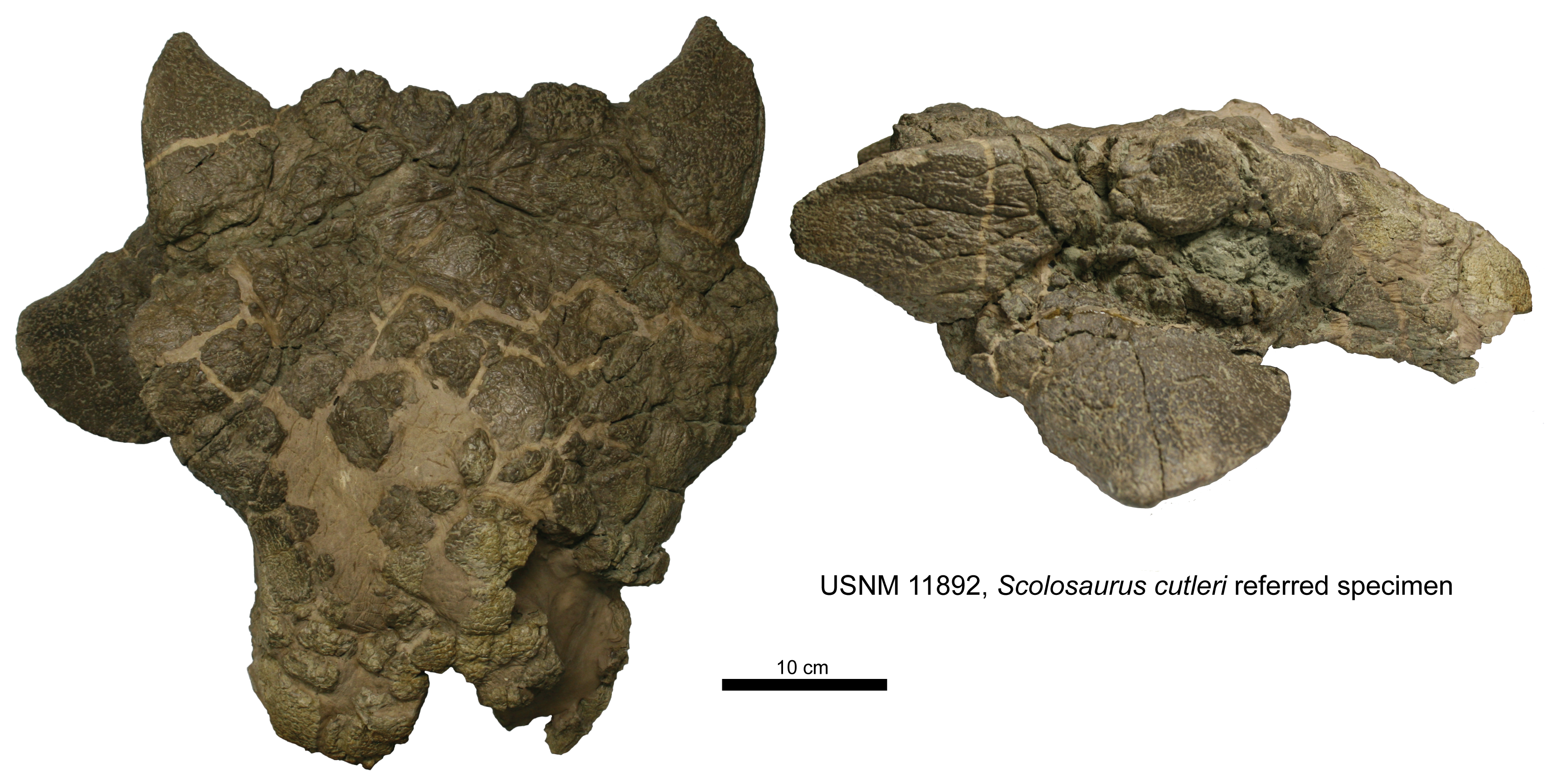
Referred skull USNM 11892

In 1874, G. M. Dawson excavated specimen USNM 7943 at the Milk River locality of the Frenchman Formation in Alberta. It was collected from terrestrial sediments that are considered to be from the Maastrichtian stage of the Late Cretaceous, approximately 70.6 to 66 million years old. The specimen consisted of a partial first cervical ring, which is part of the dinosaur's neck. In 2013, this material was assigned to Scolosaurus by Arbour and Currie who conducted a detailed phylogenetic analysis of the ankylosauridae. It is currently housed at the Smithsonian Institution in Washington, DC.

In 1928, George F. Sternberg, collected specimen USNM 11892, from the Montanazhdarcho holotype locality, high up in the Two Medicine Formation in Glacier County, Montana. The material, a partial skull, was recovered from channel sandstone sediments that were deposited during the Campanian stage, approximately 74 million years ago. This is also housed at the Smithsonian Institution.

Other referred specimens include FPDM V-31, NSM PV 20381 and TMP 2001.42.9. FPDM V-31 and TMP 2001.42.9 are both skulls, in various states of preservation. NSM PV 20381 includes a skull, dorsal vertebrae, caudal vertebrae, ribs, both scapulae, both ilia, partial ischia, and both femora, both tibiae and fibulae.

=== Distinguishing anatomical features ===
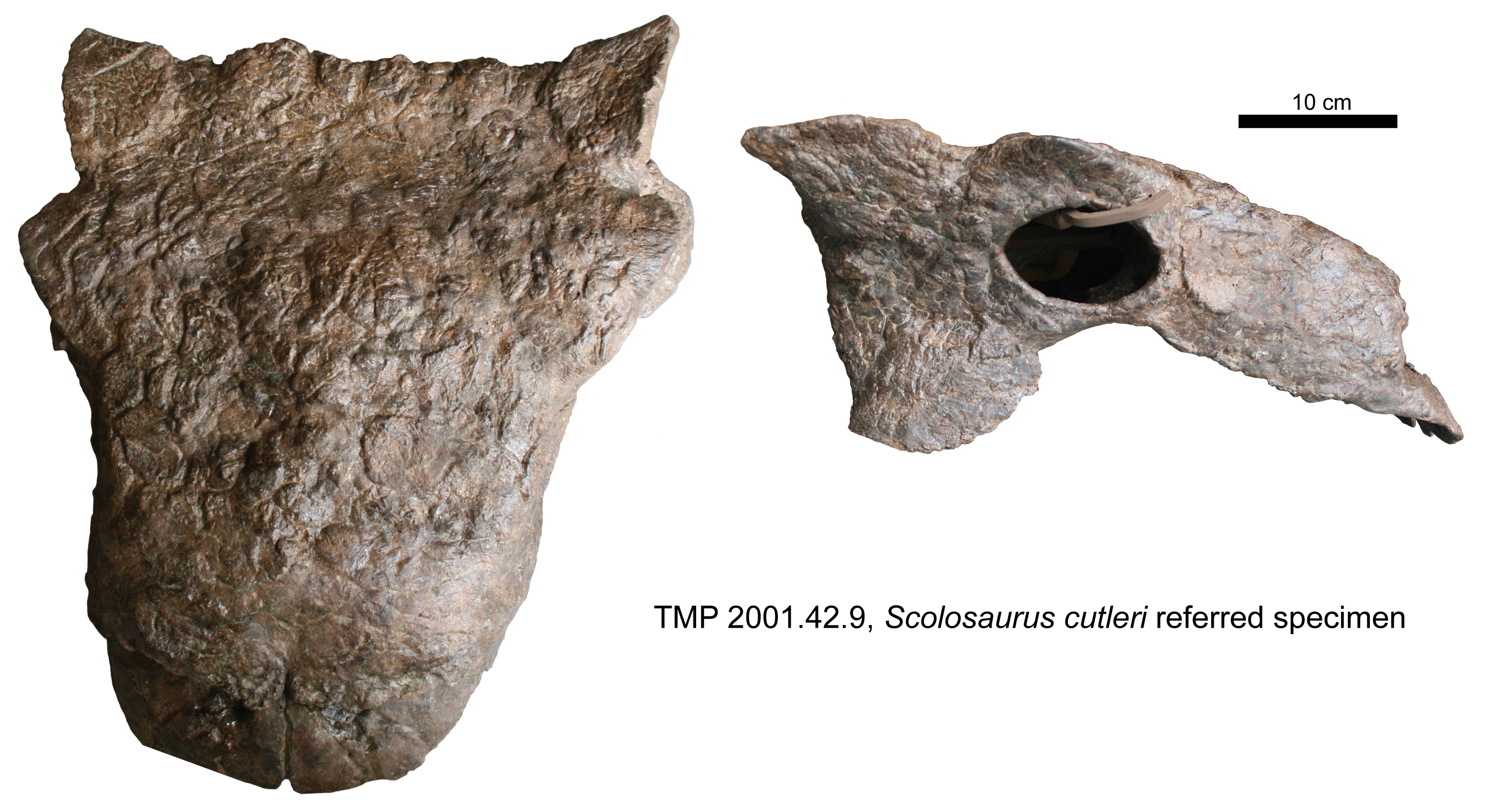
Referred skull, TMP 2001.42.9

Size of Scolosaurus compared to a human

A differential diagnosis is a statement of the anatomical features of an organism (or group) that collectively distinguish it from all other organisms. Some, but not all, of the features in a diagnosis are also autapomorphies. An autapomorphy is a distinctive anatomical feature that is unique to a given organism.

According to Arbour and Currie (2013), Scolosaurus (including the Two Medicine material) can be distinguished from other ankylosaurines based on the following characteristics:

- the squamosal horns are proportionately longer, are backswept, and have distinct apices (unlike Anodontosaurus lambei and Euoplocephalus tutus)
- the presence of a small circular caputegula at the bases of the squamosal and quadratojugal bones (unlike Euoplocephalus tutus)
- the postacetabular process of the ilium is proportionately longer (compared to Anodontosaurus lambei, Dyoplosaurus acutosquameus and Euoplocephalus tutus)
- the presence of proportionately large circular medial osteoderms with low central prominences, and compressed, half-moon shaped lateral/distal osteoderms on the cervical half rings (unlike Anodontosaurus lambei and Euoplocephalus tutus)
- the sacral ribs are laterally-directed (unlike Dyoplosaurus acutosquameus)
- the osteoderms are conical, with centrally positioned apices on the lateral sides of the anterior portion of the tail (unlike Dyoplosaurus acutosquameus)
- the tail club knob appears circular in dorsal view, unlike that of Anodontosaurus, which appears wider than it is long or that of Dyoplosaurus, which appears longer than it is wide
- the presence of anteriorly-directed nares, and the absence of a continuous keel between the squamosal horn and the supraorbital bones (unlike Ankylosaurus magniventris)

== Paleoecology ==
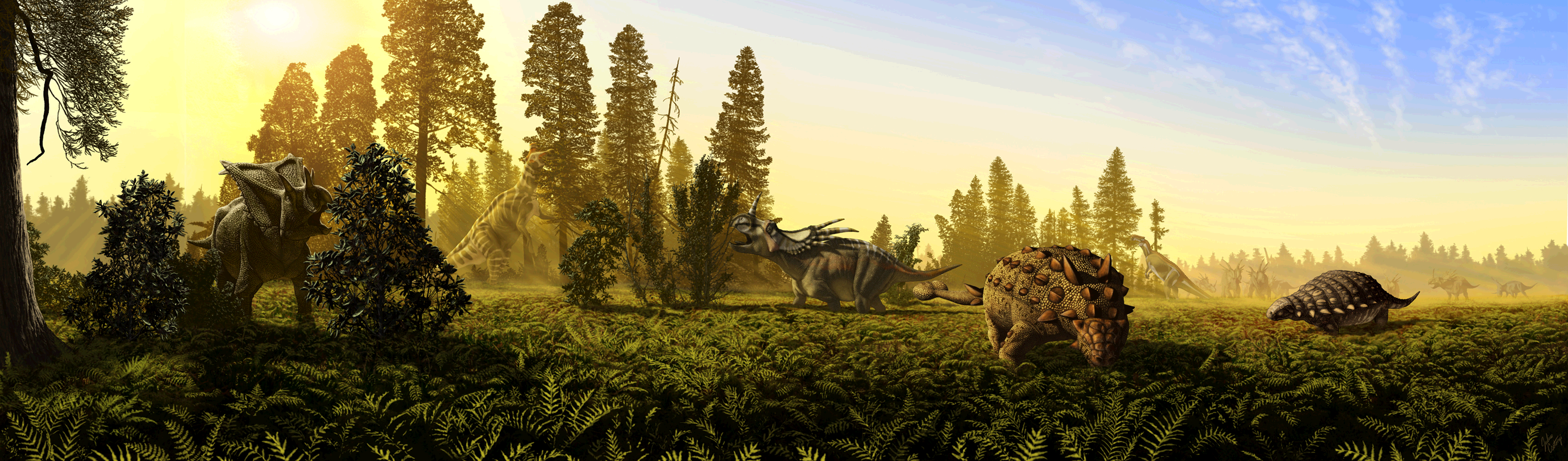
Depiction of the mega-herbivores in the Dinosaur Park Formation, Scolosaurus on the front right

=== Habitat ===
Argon-argon radiometric dating indicates that the Two Medicine Formation was deposited between 83.5 and 70.6 million years ago, during the Campanian stage of the Late Cretaceous period, in what is now northwestern Montana. If Oohkotokia is the same as Scolosaurus it would mean that Scolosaurus existed for around 3 million years. The Two Medicine Formation correlates to the Belly River Group in southwest Alberta, and the Pakowki Formation eastward. The Two Medicine Formation was deposited by rivers and deltas between the western shoreline of the Western Interior Seaway and the eastward advancing margin of the Cordilleran Overthrust Belt. Since the mid-Cretaceous, North America had been divided in half by this seaway, with much of Montana and Alberta below the surface of the water. However, the uplift of the Rocky Mountains forced the seaway to retreat eastwards and southwards. Rivers flowed down from the mountains and drained into the seaway, carrying sediment that formed the Two Medicine Formation and the Judith River Group. About 73 million years ago, the seaway began to advance westwards and northwards again, and the entire region was covered by the Bearpaw Sea, now preserved throughout the Western US and Canada by the massive Bearpaw Shale, which overlies the Two Medicine. Below this formation are the nearshore deposits of the Virgelle Sandstone. Lithologies, invertebrate faunas, and plant and pollen data support that the Two Medicine Formation was deposited in a seasonal, semi-arid climate with possible rainshadows from the Cordilleran highlands. This region experienced a long dry season and warm temperatures. The extensive red beds and caliche horizons of the upper Two Medicine are evidence of at least seasonally arid conditions.

=== Paleofauna ===
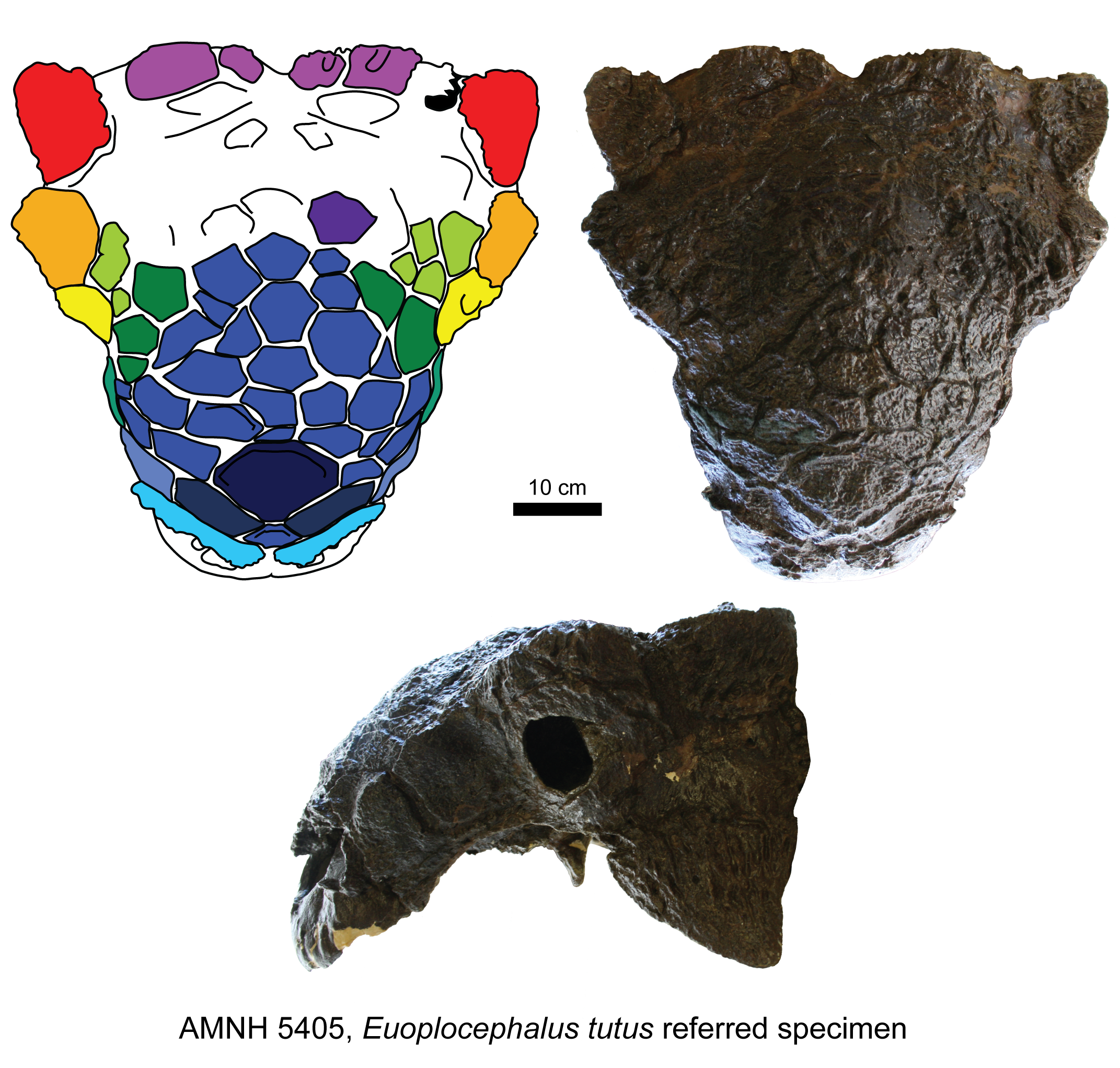
Skull of specimen AMNH 5405, Scolosaurus sp.

Scolosaurus shared its paleoenvironment with other dinosaurs, such as the duck-billed hadrosaurs Hypacrosaurus, Acristavus, Gryposaurus, Brachylophosaurus, Glishades, Prosaurolophus and Maiasaura, and the ankylosaur Edmontonia. Volcanic eruptions from the west periodically blanketed the region with ash, resulting in large-scale mortality, while simultaneously enriching the soil for future plant growth. Fluctuating sea levels also resulted in a variety of other environments at different times and places within the Judith River Group, including offshore and nearshore marine habitats, coastal wetlands, deltas and lagoons, in addition to the inland floodplains. The Two Medicine Formation was deposited at higher elevations farther inland than the other two formations. A large variety of ceratopsians coexisted in this region, which included Achelousaurus, Brachyceratops, Cerasinops, Einiosaurus, Prenoceratops and Styracosaurus. Carnivores included an unnamed troodontid, possibly Stenonychosaurus, the dromaeosaurs Bambiraptor and Saurornitholestes, and the large tyrannosaurids Daspletosaurus and Gorgosaurus.

The excellent vertebrate fossil record of Two Medicine and Judith River rocks resulted from a combination of abundant animal life, periodic natural disasters, and the deposition of large amounts of sediment. Many types of freshwater and estuarine fish are represented, including sharks, rays, sturgeons, gars and others. This region preserves the remains of many aquatic amphibians and reptiles, including bivalves, gastropods, frogs, salamanders, turtles, Champsosaurus and crocodilians. Terrestrial lizards, including whiptails, skinks, monitors and alligator lizards have also been discovered. Pterosaurs like Montanazhdarcho and Piksi as well as birds like Apatornis and Avisaurus flew overhead. Several varieties of mammals, such as the multituberculate Cimexomys coexisted with dinosaurs in the Two Medicine Formation and the various other formations that make up the Judith River wedge. Fossilized eggs belonging to a dromaeosaur have been recovered here. When water was plentiful, the region could support a great deal of plant and animal life, but periodic droughts often resulted in mass mortality.

== See also ==
- Timeline of ankylosaur research
- 2018 in paleontology
