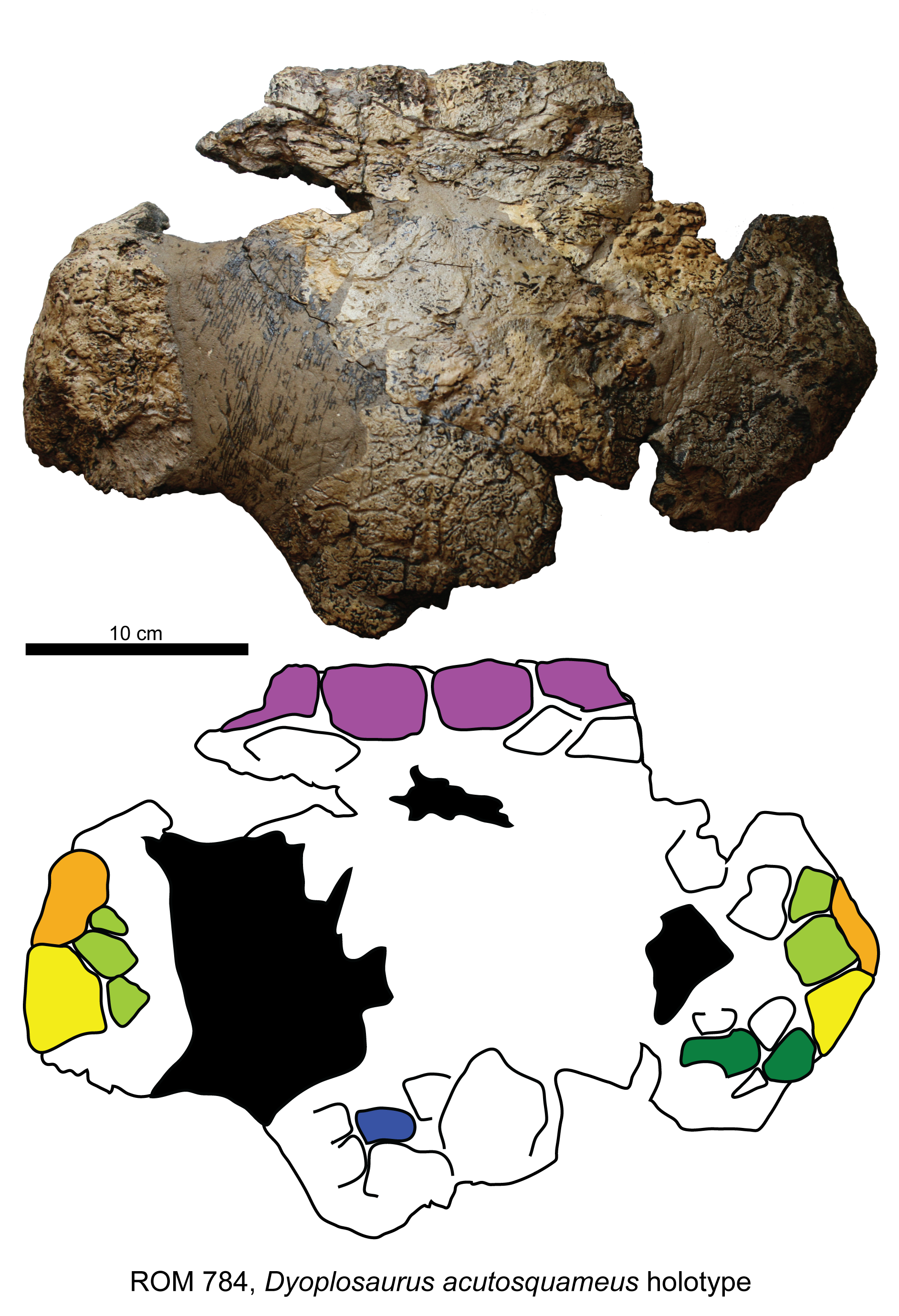
- Holotype skull

Scientific classification
- Kingdom: Animalia
- Phylum: Chordata
- Class: Reptilia
- Clade: Dinosauria
- Clade: †Ornithischia
- Clade: †Thyreophora
- Clade: †Ankylosauria
- Family: †Ankylosauridae
- Subfamily: †Ankylosaurinae
- Tribe: †Ankylosaurini
- Genus: †Dyoplosaurus; Parks, 1924
- Species: †D. acutosquameus

Binomial name
- †Dyoplosaurus acutosquameus Parks, 1924

= Dyoplosaurus =

Dyoplosaurus Temporal range: Late Cretaceous, 76.5 Ma

Extinct genus of dinosaurs

Dyoplosaurus (meaning "double-armoured lizard") is a monospecific genus of ankylosaurid dinosaur from Alberta that lived during the Late Cretaceous (middle Campanian, ~76.5–75 Ma) in what is now the Dinosaur Park Formation. Dyoplosaurus represents a close relative of Scolosaurus and Anodontosaurus, two ankylosaurids known from the Horseshoe Canyon and Dinosaur Park Formation.

== Discovery and naming ==
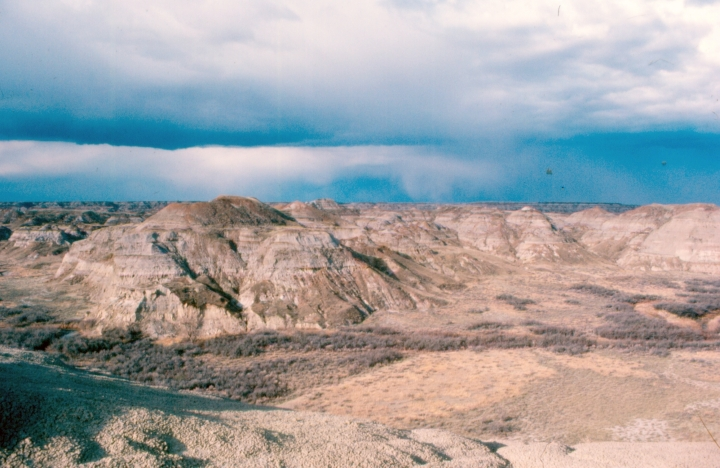
Dinosaur Park Formation in Alberta, Canada

The holotype specimen was obtained in 1919 from the bottom ten metres of the Dinosaur Park Formation by Levi Sternberg, near what is now the Red Deer River in Alberta, Canada. The holotype specimen, ROM 784, consists of a partial skull roof, mandible fragments with teeth, osteoderms, skin impressions, articulated post-thoracic vertebrae, partial thoracic ribs, a partial ilium, both ischia, tail club, associated radius, metacarpal, femur, tibia, fibula, and pes. The holotype is currently housed at the Royal Ontario Museum. Two specimens were referred to Dyoplosaurus, ROM 7761 and UA 47273, and both consist of partial tail clubs.

The generic name, Dyoplosaurus, is derived from the Greek words "dyo" (double), "hoplon" (weapon, shield, armour) and "sauros" (lizard). The specific name, acutosquameus, is derived from the Latin words "acutus" (sharp) and "squama" (scale).

In 1956, Evgeny Maleev named a second species of Dyoplosaurus: D. giganteus. The species was based on the very large specimen PIN 551/29, which consists of a series of caudal vertebrae, metatarsals, phalanges and osteoderms including tail club knob from the Nemegt Formation of Mongolia. The species was diagnosed based on the short anterior caudal vertebrae; large chevrons that were fused to the caudal vertebrae; low, long distal caudal vertebrae; short, wide metatarsals; thick, hoofed-shaped unguals; sharp, thin-walled osteoderms with numerous pits and channels on the external surface. However, a 2014 study by Arbour and colleagues considered that the holotype lacked diagnostic traits, as such traits are present in all ankylosaurines, and considered the species to be a nomen dubium.

== Description ==
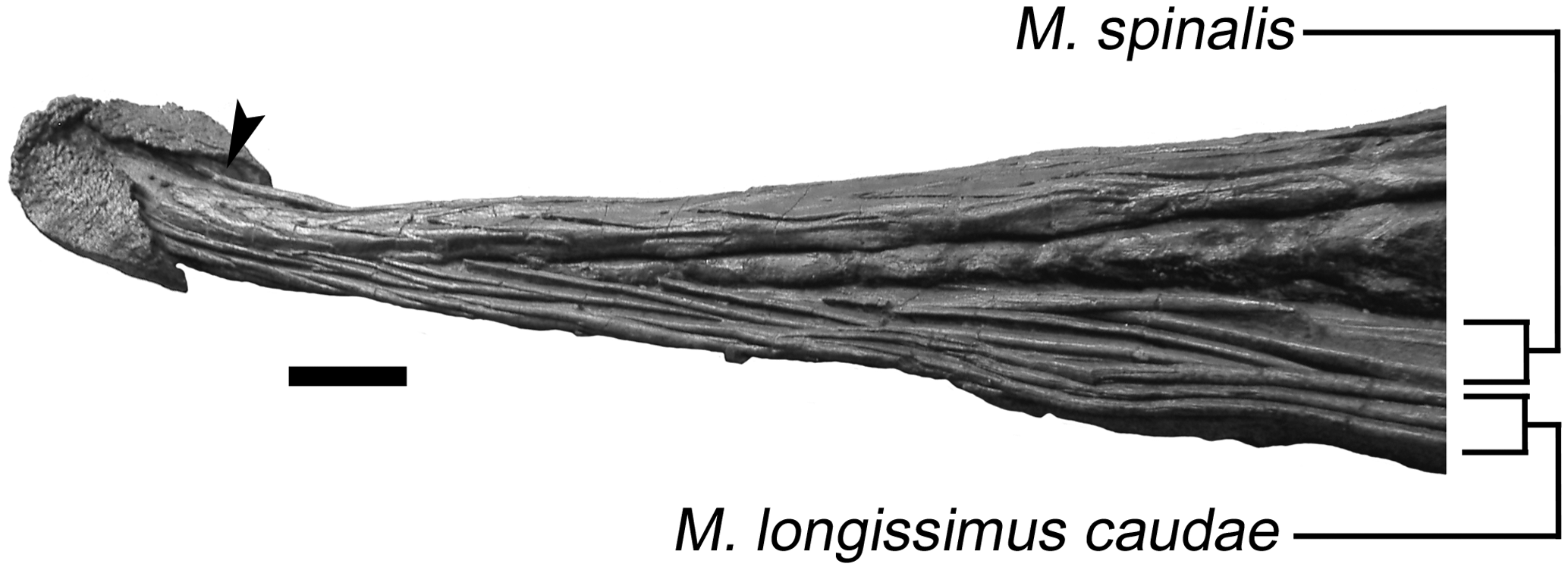

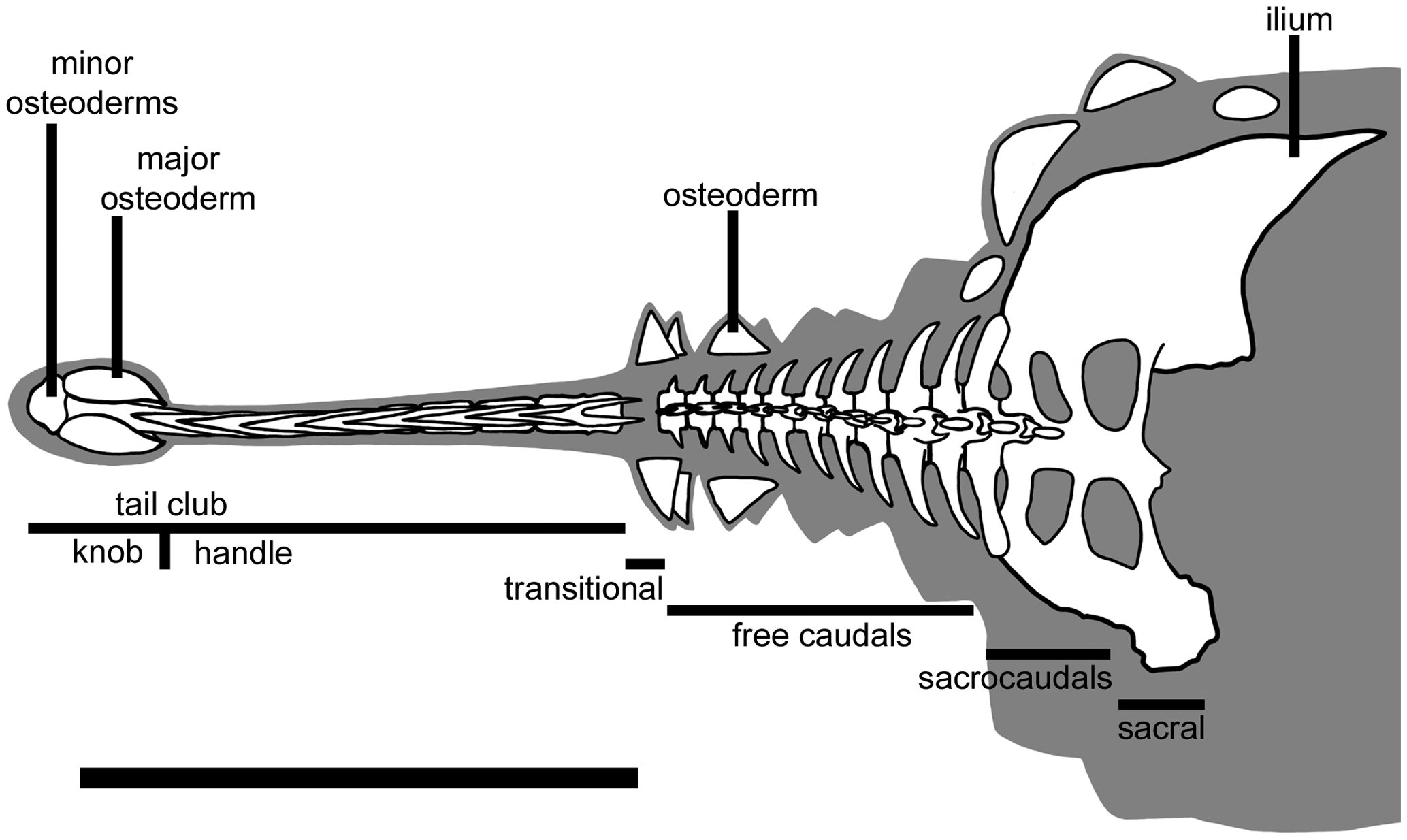
Tail of the holotype specimen and reconstruction of the tail and pelvis.

Dyoplosaurus has an estimated body length of approximately 4–4.5 metres (13–15 ft) and body mass of 1.2 metric tons (1.3 short tons). All referred specimens represent almost fully mature individuals.

Dyoplosaurus can be distinguished from all other ankylosaurids in having sacral ribs that are anterolaterally-directed, triangular unguals in dorsal view and a tail club knob that is longer than wide. It differs from Scolosaurus in having a proportionately shorter postacetabular process of the ilium and triangular osteoderms on the lateral sides of the anterior portion of the tail. Dyoplosaurus also differs from Euoplocephalus in the pelvis as it has anterolaterally projecting, ventrally directed sacral transverse processes on the third sacral vertebra, forming a butterfly-like arrangement of the sacral fenestrae, and in having ischia that articulate with the ilia at right angles.

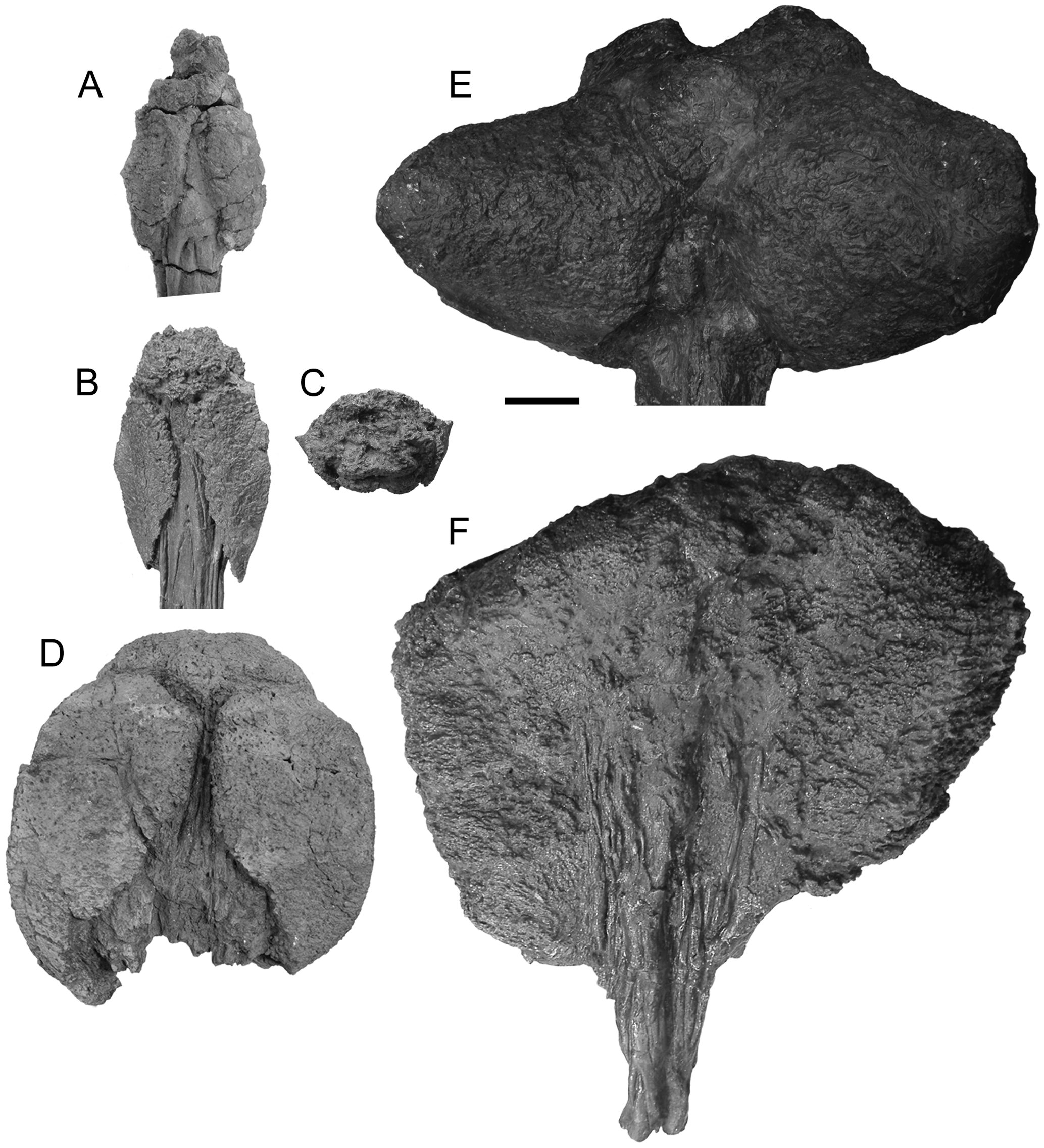
Tail club of Dyoplosaurus compared to other ankylosaurid tail clubs

The holotype specimen of Dyoplosaurus preserves ossified tendons on the tail club. The tail club preserves three series of tendons on the dorsolateral sides of the handle, and four on the distal, ventral side of the tail. These tendons are more readily grouped into two sets on the dorsolateral sides. Arbour, 2009 conducted a study to determine the impact force of ankylosaurids and used ROM 784. Arbour found that Dyoplosaurus could generate an impact force of 797–1127 N and a more realistic tensions of 571 N, an impact force that isn't enough to puncture bone. This is mainly due to the knob being smaller in comparison to that of other ankylosaurids. The small size of the tail club of suggests that ankylosaurid knobs were not primarily used as defensive weapons, as a weapon that is not functional until very late in life would probably not have a selective advantage over a weapon that is of use earlier in life.

The holotype specimen preserves remnants of fossilized skin and osteoderms on the left side. These skin impressions are punctuated by a nearly unbroken mosaic of small (0.50–1.0 cm), sub-angular to subrounded osteoderms. The skin impressions on the right side have been lost via erosion.

== Classification ==
In 1971, Walter Coombs synonymized Dyoplosaurus, along with Scolosaurus and Anodontosaurus, into Euoplocephalus as one of the four mandibles assigned to Dyoplosaurus was identical to those of other Euoplocephalus specimens, but did not offer any other characteristics to support the synonymization. However, a re-description of Dyoplosaurus published in 2009 by Victoria Arbour, Michael Burns and Robin Sissons considered it as a valid taxon and proposed that the synonymy was due to the fragmentary nature of the holotype and other referred specimens of Euoplocephalus. Thompson et al., 2011 confirmed its separation and recovered it as sister taxon to Pinacosaurus mephistocephalus. A cladistic analysis conducted by Arbour and Currie, 2015 recovered Dyoplosaurus as sister taxon to a clade containing Ankylosaurus, Euoplocephalus, Anodontosaurus and Scolosaurus, while an analysis conducted by Arbour and Evans, 2017 recovered it as sister taxon to Zuul.

A phylogenetic analysis conducted by Arbour & Evans, 2017 is reproduced below.

- Ankylosaurinae
  - Zhejiangosaurus luoyangensis
  - - - Pinacosaurus grangeri
      - Pinacosaurus mephistocephalus
    - - - Tsagantegia longicranialis
        - - Talarurus plicatospineus
          - Nodocephalosaurus kirtlandensis
      - - - Saichania chulsanensis
          - - Zaraapelta nomadis
            - Tarchia kielanae
        - Ankylosaurini
          - Ziapelta sanjuanensis
          - - Euoplocephalus tutus
            - - Ankylosaurus magniventris
              - - Anodontosaurus lambei
                - - Scolosaurus cutleri
                  - - Zuul crurivastator
                    - Dyoplosaurus acutosquameus

The results of an earlier analysis by Arbour & Currie, 2015 is reproduced below.

- Ankylosaurinae
  - Crichtonpelta
  - - Tsagantegia
    - Zhejiangosaurus
    - Pinacosaurus
    - - - Saichania
        - - Tarchia
          - Zaraapelta
      - Ankylosaurini
        - Dyoplosaurus
        - - - Talarurus
            - Nodocephalosaurus
          - - - Ankylosaurus
              - Anodontosaurus
            - Euoplocephalus
            - - Scolosaurus
              - Ziapelta

== Paleoenvironment ==
The holotype specimen of Dyoplosaurus was recovered from the base of the Dinosaur Park Formation, which dates to the middle Campanian stage of the Late Cretaceous. The lower Dinosaur Park Formation consist primarily of dryland habitats with modified channel-fills that experienced impeded drainage in the lower horizons and were subject to frequent flooding while more distal reaches of the floodplain, flooding was less frequent.

Dyoplosaurus would have coexisted with the ankylosaurs Edmontonia, Euoplocephalus, and Scolosaurus, the ceratopsid Chasmosaurus, the hadrosaurids Corythosaurus, Gryposaurus and Parasaurolophus, the tyrannosaurid Gorgosaurus, the dromaeosaurid Hesperonychus, the troodontid Latenivenatrix, and the caenagnathids Caenagnathus and Chirostenotes.

== See also ==
- Timeline of ankylosaur research
