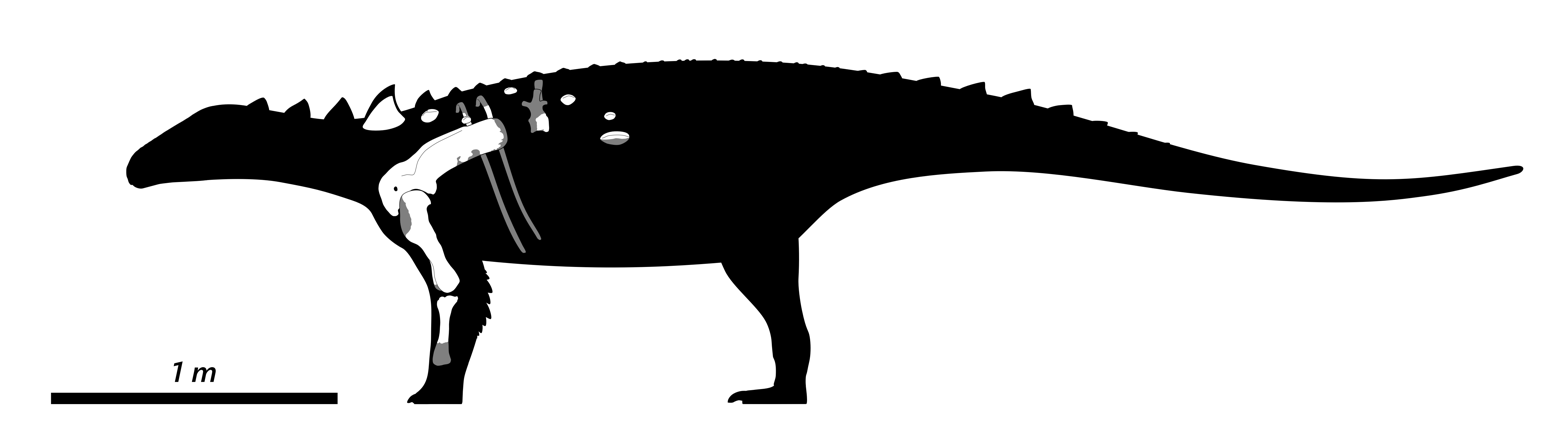
- Skeletal diagram

Scientific classification
- Kingdom: Animalia
- Phylum: Chordata
- Class: Reptilia
- Clade: Dinosauria
- Clade: †Ornithischia
- Clade: †Thyreophora
- Clade: †Ankylosauria
- Genus: †Ahshislepelta; Burns & Sullivan, 2011
- Species: †A. minor

Binomial name
- †Ahshislepelta minor Burns & Sullivan, 2011

= Ahshislepelta =

Ahshislepelta Temporal range: Late Cretaceous, 74.5 Ma

Extinct genus of dinosaurs

Ahshislepelta (meaning "Ah-shi-sle-pah Wash shield") is a monospecific genus of ankylosaur dinosaur from New Mexico that lived during the Late Cretaceous (late Campanian stage, 74.5 Ma) in what is now the Hunter Wash Member of the Kirtland Formation. The type and only species, Ahshislepelta minor, is known only from an incomplete postcranial skeleton of a small subadult or adult individual. It was named in 2011 by Michael Burns and Robert M. Sullivan. Based on the size of the humerus, Ahshislepelta is larger than Eopinacosaurus mephistocephalus but smaller than Talarurus and Pinacosaurus grangeri.

== Discovery and naming ==
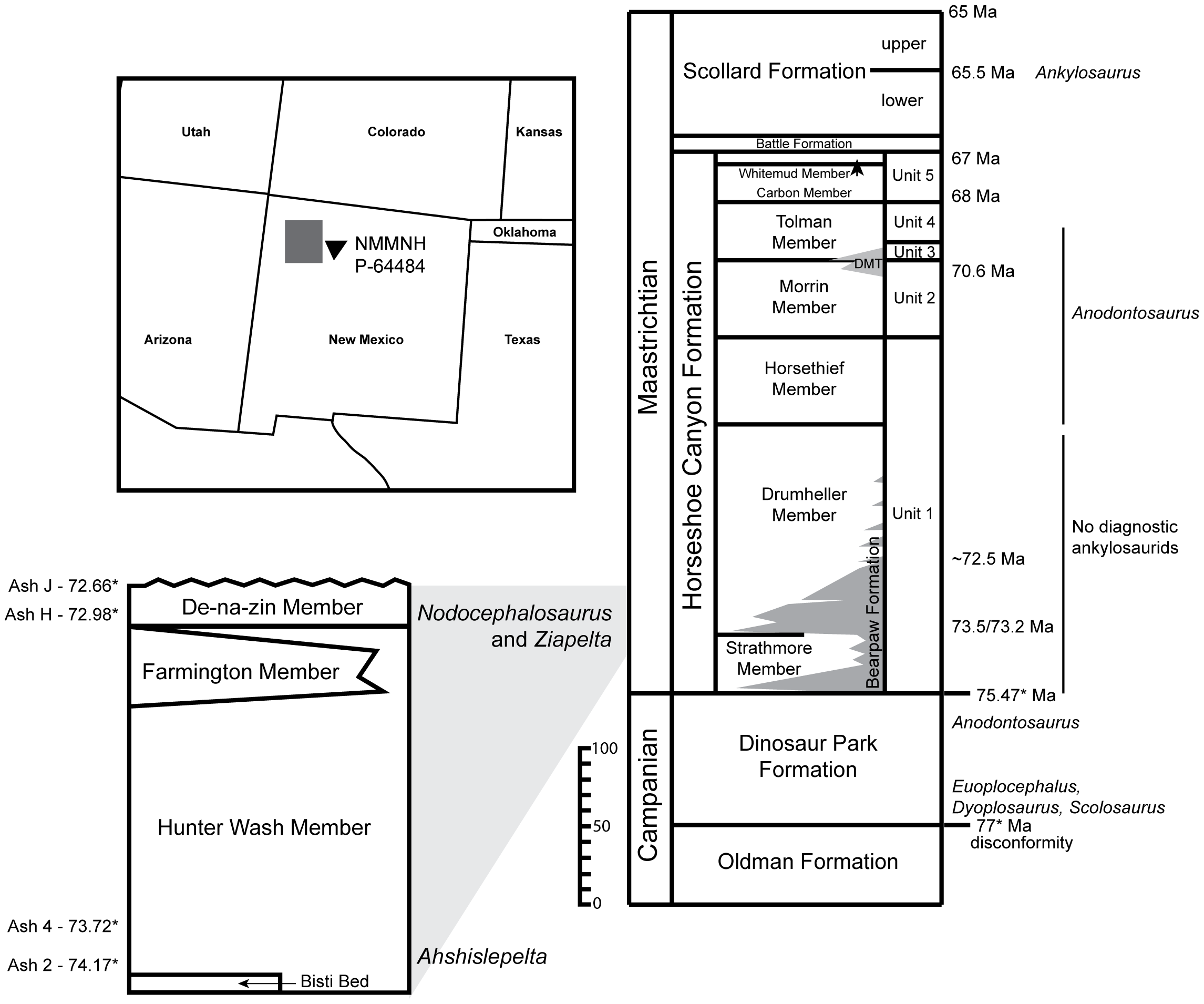
Location and stratigraphy of the Kirtland Formation.

In 2005, a partial postcranial skeleton of an ankylosaur was discovered from the Hunter Wash Member in the lower part of the Kirtland Formation, New Mexico at the Ah-shi-sle-pah Wilderness Study Area. The specimen was later collected over consecutive field seasons from 2005 to 2009 and was subsequently described in 2011 by Michael Burns and Robert M. Sullivan. The holotype specimen, SMP VP-1930, consists of a partial girdle, partial scapulocoracoid, a proximal portion of the radius, numerous cervical and/or dorsal vertebrae fragments, complete and fragmentary thoracic osteoderms, and other unidentifiable postcranial fragments. The holotype specimen is currently housed at the State Museum of Pennsylvania, Harrisburg.

The generic name, Ahshislepelta, is derived from Ah-shi-sle-pah Wash, the locality from which the holotype came, and the Ancient Greek word "peltè" (shield). The specific name, minor, is in reference to its small adult size relative to other North American ankylosaurids.

The holotype specimen represents a subadult or adult individual based on the complete fusion of the scapulocoracoids, centra and neural arches of the vertebrae, and the re-modelled osteoderm cores. The holotype falls within the same size range as adult specimens of other ankylosaurid taxa outside of North America and represents an individual that was larger than juvenile specimens of Pinacosaurus grangeri and Pinacosaurus mephistocephalus but smaller than Talarurus and adult specimens of P. grangeri based on humeral size; however, the scapulocoracoid is larger than that of Talarurus.

== Description ==
=== Distinguishing traits ===
Size of Ahshislepelta compared to a human.

Burns & Sullivan (2011) diagnosed Ahshislepelta based on the dorsolateral overhang of the scapular acromion process to 25% of the dorsoventral width of the scapula. Ahshislepelta differs from other ankylosaurids, with the exception of Euoplocephalus, by the superficial osteodermal surface texture, characterized by uniformly distributed pitted rugosity, and sparse distribution of reticular neurovascular grooves with neurovascular foramina extending perpendicularly to obliquely into the bone.

=== Postcrania ===
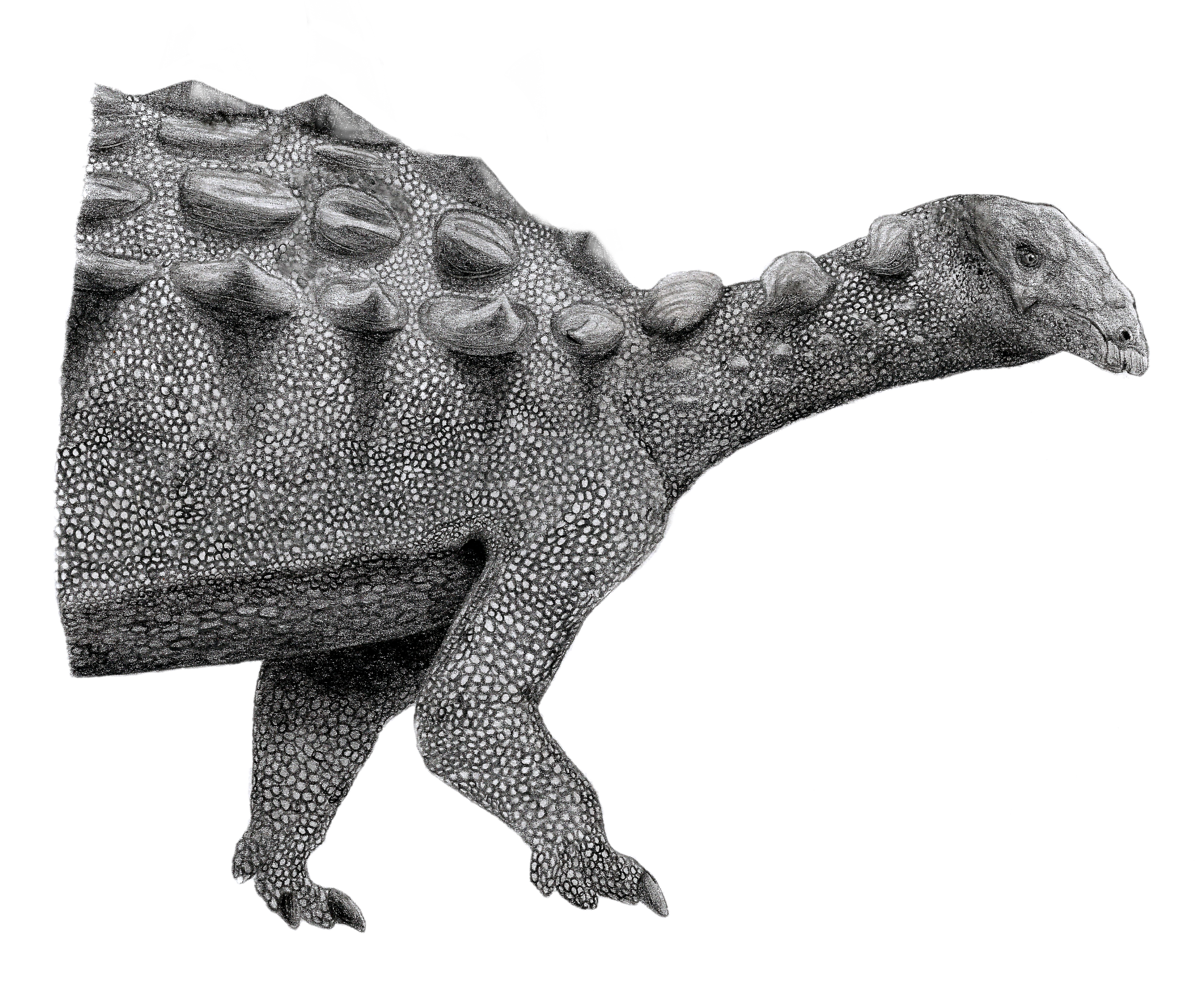
Speculative restoration as a nodosaurid.

The right scapula preserves osteoderms on the lateral side at the most distal portion and is associated with fragments of ribs that are mostly visible on the medial side. The scapula is fully fused to the coracoid and has a blunt, rugose process along the anterodorsal margin for the attachment of muscles. The coracoid is roughly 16 cm long and the coracoid foramen is anterodorsal to the glenoid cavity. The glenoid cavity forms an arc that projects the scapular margin posteroventrally at an 80° angle relative to the coracoid margin. As in nodosaurids, the scapula does not narrow towards the upper surface and sides relative to the coracoid and does not exhibit a scapular neck. A rugose, ridge-like structure that is identified as the acromion is present along the dorsal margin of the scapula opposite the glenoid cavity. The acromion attains its front most extension towards the back and sides to the most anterior extent of the glenoid cavity. Due to taphonomic shearing, the prominent overhang of the acromion on the left scapula is absent, although this feature is not a taphonomic artefact on the right scapulocoracoid. However, the right scapulocoracoid is cracked, its junction with the scapular blade is visible, well-preserved, and verifies its natural projection towards the lower edge and sides. Towards the sides of the acromion, the borders of the infraspinous fossa are prominent and creates an area or the attachment of muscles. The left forelimb is more than 50% complete. As in ankylosaurids, the left humerus is massive and has a length of 31 cm. The left humerus preserves a deltopectoral crest that is well-developed and measures 15 cm across the widest portion of the humerus. The lateral margin of the deltopectoral crest forms a 23° angle in posterior view with the long axis of the humerus. Bounded by the deltopectoral crest and humeral head is a broad, bicipital fossa that is present on the anterior face of the humerus. On the anterior face of the humerus is a hemispherical radial condyle. The proximal articular surface of the left radius is oval in proximal view and is concave. The articular surface is 8 cm long, proportionally twice the diameter of the diaphysis.

Numerous vertebrae fragments that probably represent parts of the cervicals and/or dorsals were recovered and the position of the vertebrae are based on their association with elements of the pectoral girdles and forelimb. A few vertebrae were dorsoventrally tall dorsal vertebrae, based on a few of the more complete vertebrae appearing to have laterally compressed neural canals. All other vertebrae lack open sutural facets for the neural arches.

=== Osteoderms ===
Numerous osteoderms and associated osteoderm fragments were associated with the holotype specimen. Most osteoderms pertain to the thoracic region while others might pertain to the pelvic region and forelimbs. All osteoderms are either keeled or circular with an off-center apex. The distal portion of the right scapula preserves an in situ osteoderm and numerous ossicles. The osteoderm and ossicles of the right scapula and another series of osteoderms preserved in situ display a rosette arrangement of small ossicles surrounding the osteoderms. The largest osteoderm pertains to the thoracic region behind the cervical region based on the similar morphology to the median thoracic osteoderms of the holotype specimen of Scolosaurus. The osteoderm has a length of 15 cm, a width of 12 cm and a height of 10 cm. The smallest ossicle has a diameter of 1 cm. The surface texture of the osteoderms are smooth to uniformly pitted with a sparse patterns of grooves as in Euoplocephalus. One osteoderm has a histological condition typical of that of ankylosaurids.

== Classification ==
Burns & Sullivan (2011) originally placed Ahshislepelta as an ankylosaurid within the clade Ankylosaurinae, although this was not based on the result of a phylogenetic analysis. Likewise, Arbour & Currie (2015) placed Ahshislepelta as sister taxon to Gastonia at the base of Ankylosauridae, and Wiersma and Irmis (2018) placed it in a polytomy consisting of Euoplocephalus, Oohkotokia, Scolosaurus, Ziapelta, Anodontosaurus, Ankylosaurus and Dyoplosaurus.

On the other hand, several other studies have favored a nodosaurid position. Arbour et al. (2016) recovered it in a polytomy with Niobrarasaurus and a juvenile nodosaurid from the Paw Paw Formation, while Zheng et al. (2018) positioned Ahshislepelta in a polytomy containing Tatankacephalus, Silvisaurus, Niobrarasurus, Nodosaurus and more deeply nested taxa. Rivera-Sylva et al. (2018) placed it as sister taxon to Niobrarasurus.

A phylogenetic analysis conducted by Rivera-Sylva et al. (2018) is reproduced below, favoring a nodosaurid position. Clade names have been added following Madzia et al. (2021).

- Nodosauridae
  - - Sauroplites
    - Mymoorapelta
    - Dongyangopelta
  - - Gastonia
    - - Gargoyleosaurus
      - - Polacanthinae
          - Hoplitosaurus
          - Polacanthus
        - Nodosaurinae
          - Peloroplites
          - - Taohelong
            - Sauropelta
            - - Acantholipan
              - Nodosaurus
              - - Niobrarasaurus
                - Ahshislepelta
              - - Tatankacephalus
                - - Silvisaurus
                  - - CPC 273
                    - - Panoplosaurini
                        - Animantarx
                        - - Panoplosaurus
                          - - Patagopelta
                            - Texasetes
                            - Denversaurus
                            - Edmontonia longiceps
                            - Edmontonia rugosidens
                      - Struthiosaurini
                        - - Hungarosaurus
                          - Europelta
                        - - Pawpawsaurus
                          - Stegopelta
                          - Struthiosaurus languedocensis
                          - - Struthiosaurus transylvanicus
                            - Struthiosaurus austriacus

In contrast, an earlier analysis by Arbour & Currie (2015) favors an ankylosaurid position. Their results are reproduced below.

- Ankylosauridae
  - - Gastonia
    - Ahshislepelta
  - - Aletopelta
    - Liaoningosaurus
    - - Cedarpelta
      - Chuanqilong
    - - - Gobisaurus
        - Shamosaurus
      - - Crichtonpelta
        - - Tsagantegia
          - "Zhejiangosaurus"
          - - Pinacosaurus grangeri
            - Pinacosaurus mephistocephalus
          - - - Saichania
              - - Tarchia
                - Zaraapelta
            - - Dyoplosaurus
              - - - Talarurus
                  - Nodocephalosaurus
                - - - Ankylosaurus
                    - Anodontosaurus
                  - Euoplocephalus
                  - - Scolosaurus
                    - Ziapelta

== Paleoenvironment ==
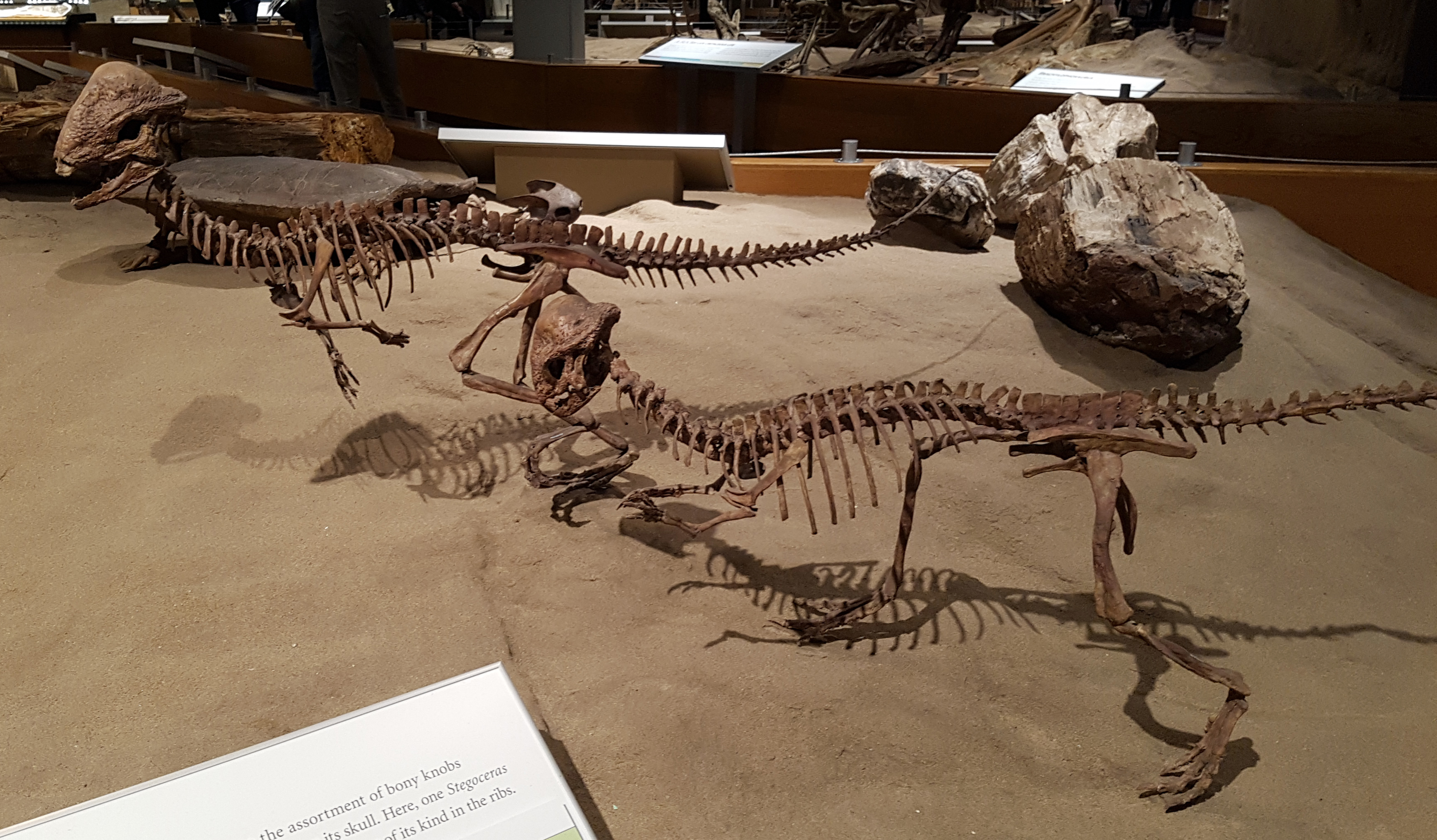
Stegoceras, a pachycephalosaurid contemporaneous with Ahshislepelta.

Ahshislepelta is known from the Hunter Wash Member of the Kirtland Formation which has been dated to the upper Campanian stage, 74.5 Ma. The Kirtland Formation consists of interbedded sandstone, siltstone, mudstone, coal and shale. The Kirtland Formation lies on the western margin of the Western Interior Seaway and represents a floodplain that was abundant with ferns, conifers and flowering plants. Based on the abundance of angiosperms with leaves that have entire or nearly entire margins and drip points, the Kirtland Formation may have had a warm temperate to subtropical climate. The Kirtland Formation was better drained than the underlying Fruitland Formation due to the lack of coal swamps.

Ahshislepelta coexisted with the pachycephalosaurid Stegoceras, the chasmosaurine ceratopsids Navajoceratops and Terminocavus, the ankylosaurine ankylosaurid Ziapelta, the eutyrannosaur tyrannosauroid Bistahieversor, and the azhdarchid pterosaur Navajodactylus.

== See also ==
- Timeline of ankylosaur research
