= Robert M. Sullivan =

Vertebrate paleontologist

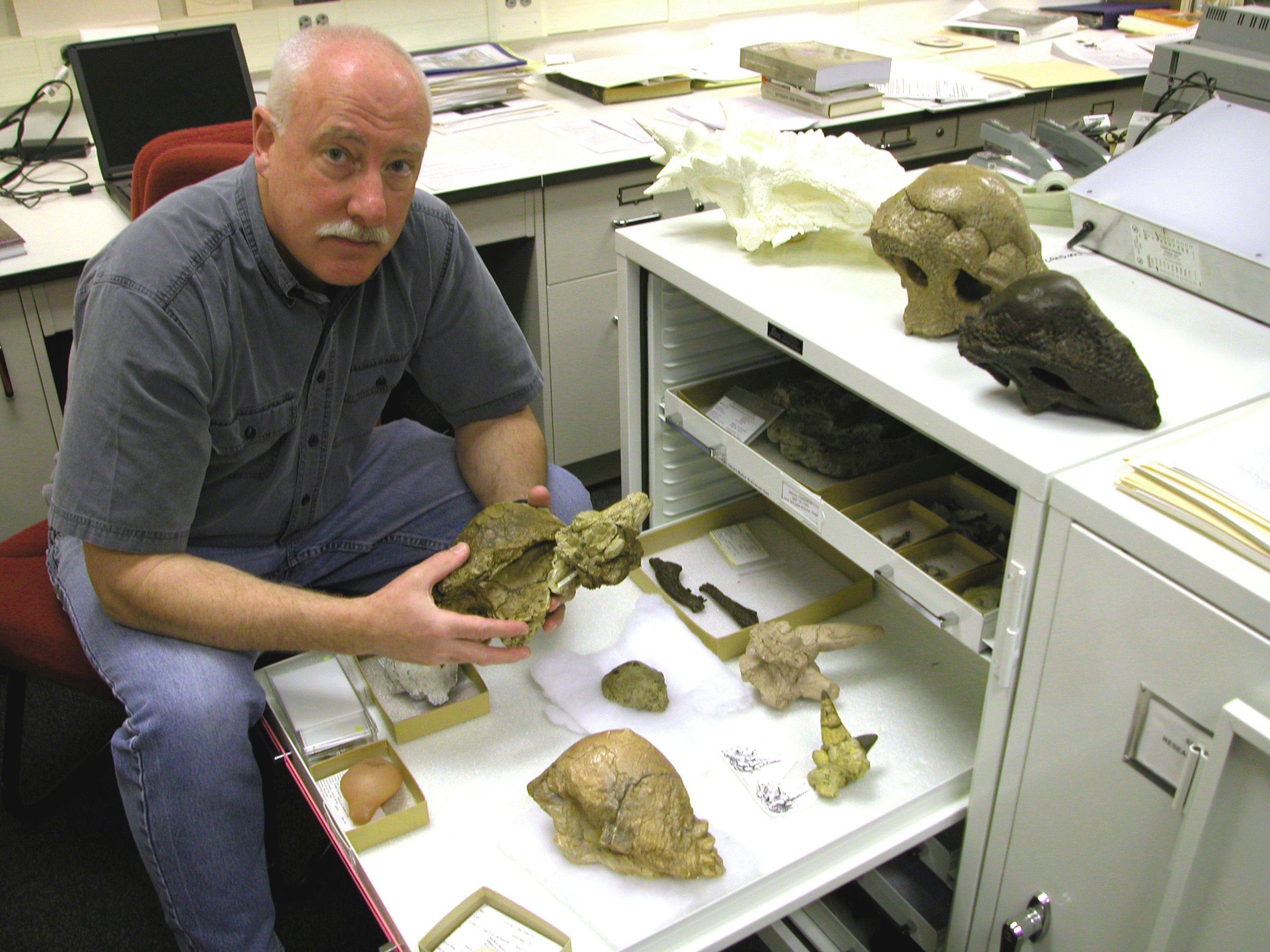
Robert M. Sullivan in office holding a pachycephalosaurid skull.

Robert Michael "Bob" Sullivan (born August 4, 1951) is a vertebrate paleontologist, noted for his work on fossil lizards and dinosaurs.

Sullivan discovered the second and most complete skull of the hadrosaurid dinosaur, Parasaurolophus tubicen, and skulls of the ankylosaurids Nodocephalosaurus kirtlandensis and Ziapelta sanjuanensis. He also made contributions to Late Cretaceous vertebrate faunas from the San Juan Basin, New Mexico, including establishing the Kirtlandian land vertebrate "age" for a time interval between the Judithian and younger Edmontonian "ages".

Sullivan is also noted for his work on pachycephalosaurid dinosaurs, and was an early vocal critic of the asteroid impact theory as the cause for dinosaur extinction.

== Early life ==
Born in Queens, New York, to parents Robert F. Sullivan and Marian E. Sullivan, Sullivan lived in Tarrytown, New York (1951-1953) and moved to Fairfield, Connecticut in early 1953. He had two younger brothers. Later, he lived in Trumbull, Connecticut, until college in the fall of 1969.

Robert grew up reading natural history books, including E. H. Colbert's (1961) Dinosaurs: Their discovery and their world, which fueled his fascination with dinosaurs at a very early age. He became an avid collector of butterflies, rocks, minerals and fossils, but it was his love for prehistoric animals that would consume his professional career.

On occasion, Sullivan's father would drop him off at the Peabody Museum of Natural History at Yale University, where he would spend hours in the dinosaur gallery viewing the various fossil vertebrates. His grandmother was especially supportive of his desire to become a paleontologist and drove him to a well-known Devonian roadside outcrop in Stroudsburg, Pennsylvania, where he would spend hours collecting fossil bryozoans, rugose corals and brachiopods. As a teenager he and a friend constructed a natural history "museum" and planetarium in the basement of his friend's house.

== Academic life ==
Sullivan attended St. Joseph's Boys High School in Trumbull from 1964 to 1965 and then the University of New Mexico where he received his B.A. in Geology in 1973. Upon graduation, he moved to Lincoln, Nebraska where he commenced a graduate program in geology and vertebrate paleontology.

The summer of 1973 Sullivan worked as a field paleontologist near Crawford, Nebraska, for the University of Nebraska State Museum, and found a partial skull and skeleton of a fossil lizard that would alter his scientific pursuits. In 1974, he left graduate school and moved to San Francisco where he landed a job as a lab technician for BP Alaska, Inc. A year later, he moved to San Diego to study the fossil lizard Glyptosaurus under the direction of Richard Dean Estes, the subject of his masters thesis which was published in 1979.

Sullivan received his M.S. in Vertebrate Paleontology (Special Major) at San Diego State University in 1978 and graduated with a Ph.D. in Geology from Michigan State University under the tutelage of J. Alan Holman in 1980.

== Professional life ==
Upon graduation, Sullivan worked for several oil companies in Denver in the early 1980s and then taught college in Alabama and subsequently at various colleges and universities in California, including the University of California-Riverside. He served as an NSF curatorial assistant in the late 1980s and later as collection manager in the Department of Herpetology of the San Diego Natural History Museum (1990-1992).

At the end of 1992 Sullivan became the Senior Curator of Paleontology and Geology at the State Museum of Pennsylvania in Harrisburg, Pennsylvania, where he stayed until his retirement in 2012.

== San Juan Basin fieldwork ==
In the mid 1980s, Sullivan spent time working in the Paleocene Nacimiento Formation looking for fossil lizards, with little luck, and occasionally would wander down section into the Upper Cretaceous rocks of the San Juan Basin. He began intensive fieldwork in the Upper Cretaceous in 1995 with occasional interruptions, spending numerous summers collecting fossil vertebrates from the Fruitland, Kirtland and Ojo Alamo (Naashoibito Member) formations. This fieldwork, which spanned over two decades, resulted in numerous unique and significant discoveries, including the recovery of New Mexico's first pterosaur Navajodactylus boerei, along with many new dinosaur species.

== Grants received and other affiliations ==
Sullivan has been the recipient of grants from Sigma XI (1974), the National Science Foundation (1984), the Dinosaur Society (1996) and the Jurassic Foundation (1999). Served as Program Officer, Society of Vertebrate Paleontology (1991 - 1993)

Sullivan held Research Associate positions with the University of Colorado (1980 - 1982), San Diego Natural History Museum (1987 - 1990), Natural History Museum of Los Angeles (1984 - 1992), Carnegie Museum of Natural History (1993 - present) and the New Mexico Museum of Natural History and Science (1998 - present).

== Selected major publications ==
- 1979. Revision of the Paleogene genus Glyptosaurus (Reptilia, Anguidae). Bulletin of the American Museum of Natural History, 163(1): 1-72.
- 1986. The skull of Glyptosaurus sylvestris Marsh 1871 (Lacertilia: Anguidae). Journal of Vertebrate Paleontology, 6(1): 28-37.
- 1987. Parophisaurus pawneensis (Gilmore, 1928), new genus of anguid lizard from the middle Oligocene of North America. Journal of Herpetology, 21(2): 115-133.
- 1987. A reassessment of reptilian diversity across the Cretaceous-Tertiary boundary. Contributions in Science, Natural History Museum of Los Angeles County, No. 391, 26pp.
- 1989. Proglyptosaurus huerfanensis new genus, new species of glyptosaurine lizard (Squamata: Anguidae) from the early Eocene of Colorado. American Museum Novitates, No. 2949, 8pp.
- 1999. (Robert M. Sullivan and Thomas E. Williamson) A new skull of Parasaurolophus (Dinosauria: Hadrosauridae) from the Kirtland Formation of New Mexico and a revision of the genus. New Mexico Museum of Natural History and Science Bulletin, Number 15, 52pp.
- 1999. Nodocephalosaurus kirtlandensis gen. et sp. nov., a new ankylosaurid dinosaur (Ornithischia: Ankylosauria) from the Upper Cretaceous (Late Campanian) Kirtland Formation of New Mexico. Journal of Vertebrate Paleontology, 19(1): 126-139.
- 1999. (Robert M. Sullivan, Thomas Keller, and Jörg Habersetzer). Middle Eocene (Geiseltalian) anguid lizards from Geiseltal and Messel, Germany. I. Ophisauriscus quadrupes Kuhn 1940. Systematics and Taphonomy. Courier Forschungstitut Senckenberg, 216: 97-129.
- 2003. Revision of the dinosaur Stegoceras Lambe (Ornithischia: Pachycephalosauridae). Journal of Vertebrate Paleontology, 23(1): 181-207.
- 2003. (Robert M. Sullivan and Spencer G. Lucas). The Kirtlandian -a new land-vertebrate "age" from the Late Cretaceous of western North America. New Mexico Geological Society Guidebook, 54: 375-383.
- 2006. (Robert M. Sullivan and Spencer G. Lucas). The Kirtlandian land-vertebrate "age"—faunal composition, temporal position and biostratigraphic correlation in the nonmarine Upper Cretaceous of western North America. New Mexico Museum of Natural History and Science, Bulletin 35: 7-29.
- 2013. (Victoria M. Arbour, Michael E. Burns, Robert M. Sullivan, Spencer G. Lucas, Amanda K. Cantrell, Joshua Fry and Thomas L. Suazo). A new ankylosaurid dinosaur (Ornithischia, Ankylosauria) from the Upper Cretaceous (Kirtlandian) of New Mexico with implications for ankylosaurid diversity in the Upper Cretaceous of western North America. PLoS ONE, 9(9): 1-14.
- 2019. The taxonomy, chronostratigraphy and paleobiogeography of glyptosaurine lizards (Glyptosaurinae, Anguidae). Comptes Rendus Palevol 18 (2019): 747-763.
