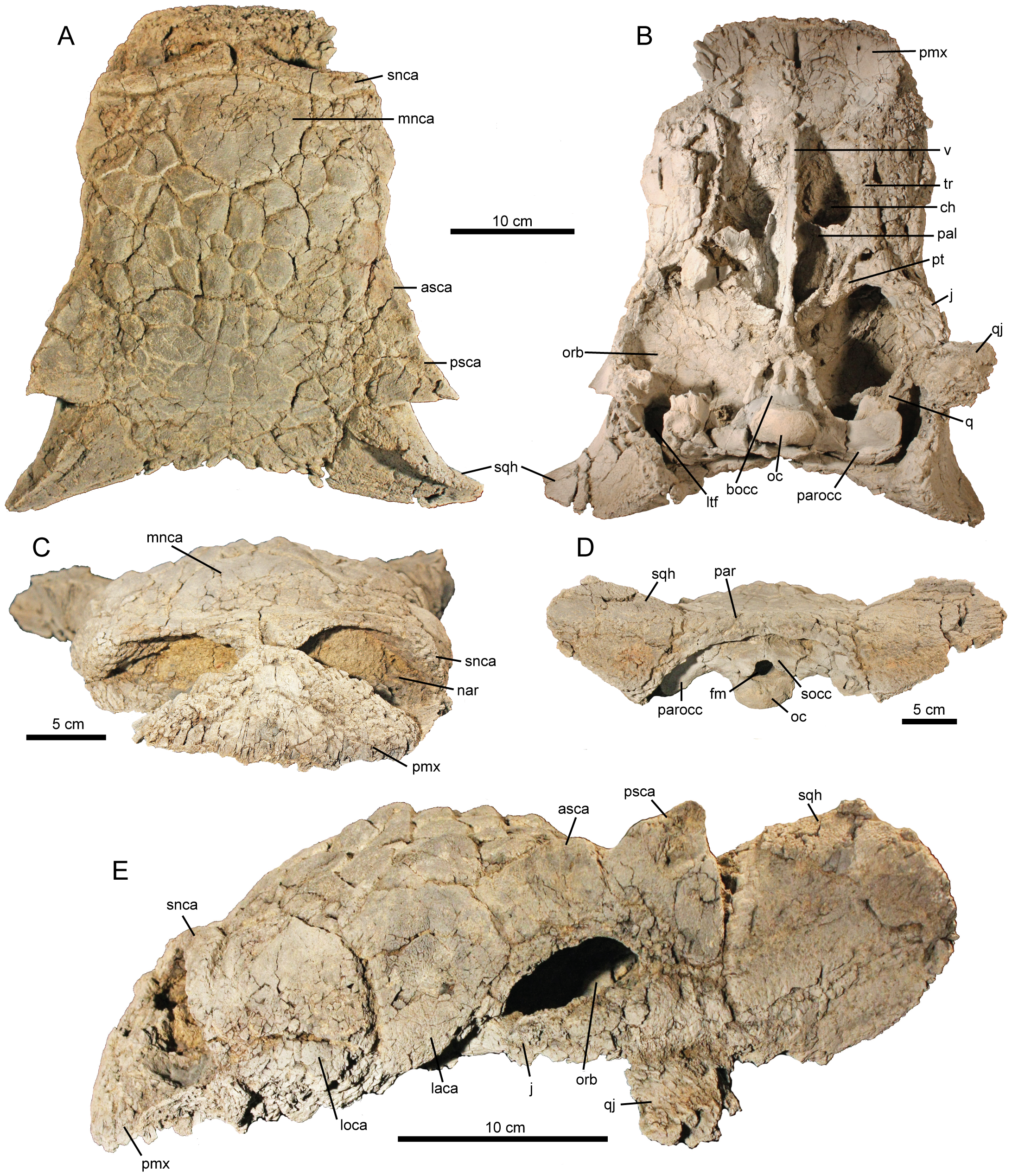
- Holotype skull

Scientific classification
- Kingdom: Animalia
- Phylum: Chordata
- Class: Reptilia
- Clade: Dinosauria
- Clade: †Ornithischia
- Clade: †Thyreophora
- Clade: †Ankylosauria
- Family: †Ankylosauridae
- Subfamily: †Ankylosaurinae
- Tribe: †Ankylosaurini
- Genus: †Ziapelta; Arbour et al., 2014

Type species
- †Ziapelta sanjuanensis Arbour et al., 2014

= Ziapelta =

Ziapelta Temporal range: Campanian, 74.5–72.6 Ma

Genus of ankylosaurid dinosaur from the Late Cretaceous period

Ziapelta is an extinct genus of ankylosaurid. Its fossils have been found in the Hunter Wash and De-na-zin members of the Kirtland Formation of Upper Cretaceous (Campanian) New Mexico. It was named in 2014, in a research paper led by ankylosaur researcher Victoria Arbour. There is a single species in the genus, Ziapelta sanjuanensis. The genus is named after the Zia sun symbol, a stylized sun with four groups of rays, having religious significance to the Zia people of New Mexico, and the iconic symbol on the state flag of New Mexico, and pelta (Latin), a small shield, in reference to the osteoderms found on all ankylosaurids. The specific name is in reference to San Juan County and the San Juan basin, where the fossils were found. Multiple specimens have been described to date, though the fossils are mostly from the front part of the animal. Its closest relative appears to be either Scolosaurus or Nodocephalosaurus, depending on what cladistic model is used.

== Discovery ==
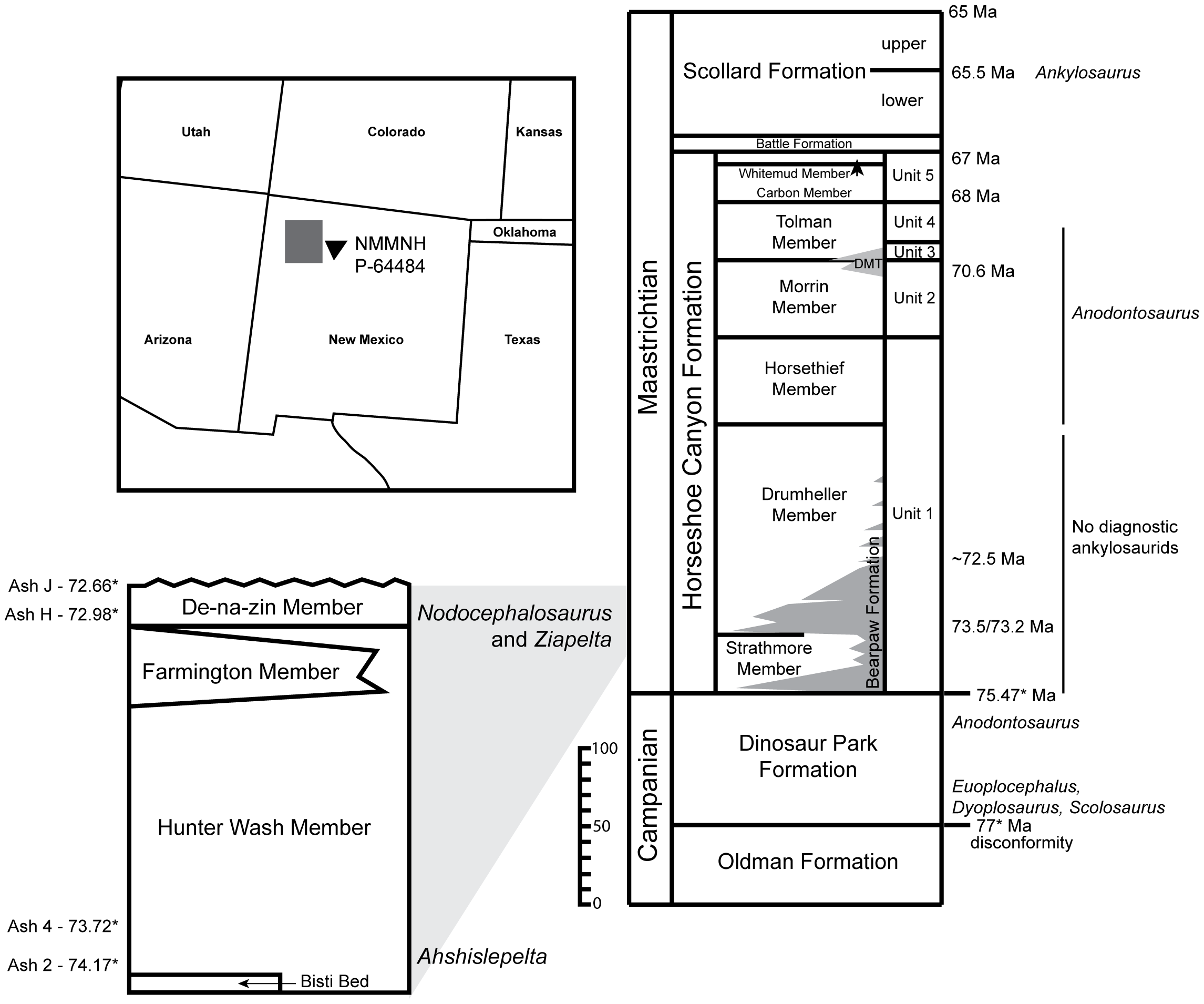
Location and stratigraphy of the find

An expedition from the New Mexico Museum of Natural History and Science and the State Museum of Pennsylvania, led by Robert Michael Sullivan, discovered a number of Z. sanjuanensis fossils in the Kirtland Formation in 2011. The specimens were found in the Hunter Wash and De-na-zin Members of the formation in the Bisti/De-Na-Zin Wilderness in New Mexico. Z. sanjuanensis was identified as a new species from a number of fossils including the holotype NMMNH P-64484 found from the De-na-zin Member and consisting of a complete skull lacking the lower jaws, parts of the first two cervical half-rings, and a number of partial osteoderms; and a referred specimen NMMNH P-66930 from the older Hunter Wash Member, consisting of a first cervical half-ring. By argon dating of ash layers the age of the holotype skull has been determined at between 72.98 and 72.62 million years old, the late Campanian. It was initially prepared by Amanda K. Cantrell and Thomas L. Suazo; later by Larry Rinehart.

In 2014 Victoria Megan Arbour, Michael Burns, Robert Sullivan, Spencer Lucas, Amanda Cantrell, Joshua Fry and Thomas Suazo named the type species Ziapelta sanjuanensis. The genus (Ziapelta) was named after the Zia sun symbol, a religious image for the Zia people and an element of the flag of New Mexico, and the Latin word pelta ("shield"), referring to ankylosaurids' osteoderms. The specific name (sanjuanensis) comes from San Juan County, where the fossils were discovered.

== Description ==
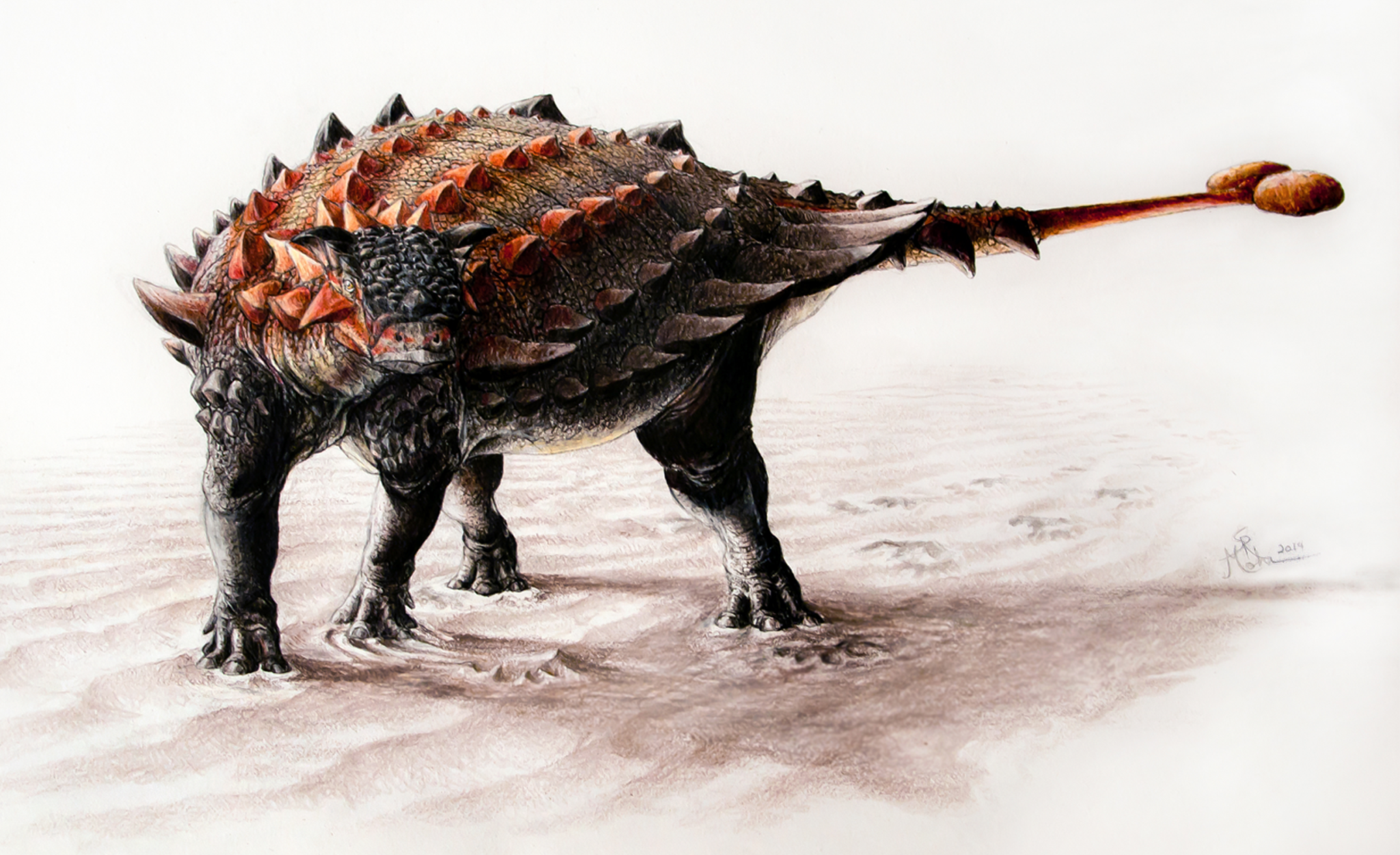
Artistic illustration

Ziapelta is known from a complete skull and specimens of first cervical half ring, so its head and cervical armor may have been separated from the body before the specimen was buried.

=== Distinguishing traits ===
Ziapelta sanjuanensis showed three unique derived traits or autapomorphies. The caputegulum (middle bone plate), of the snout was large, prominent and roughly triangular in shape. Ziapelta had deep, anteriorly curved squamosal horns (measuring 10.2 centimetres (4.0 in) from the base to the tip). The rear base of the skull featured three deep grooves. A further possible distinguishing trait is the mixture of concave, flat and convex caputegulae on the skull top.

From the Kirtland Formation a second ankylosaur is known from limited remains, Nodocephalosaurus. Ziapelta differs from Nodocephalosaurus in several traits. The edge on the squamosal horns is sharper. The points of these horns are more curved to the front instead of to below. The osteoderm peaks above the eye sockets are sharper. The caputegulae are more irregular in form, at best lightly convex instead of cone-shaped, have a more rectangular outline, instead of a rounded one, and are separated by deeper grooves.

=== Skull ===
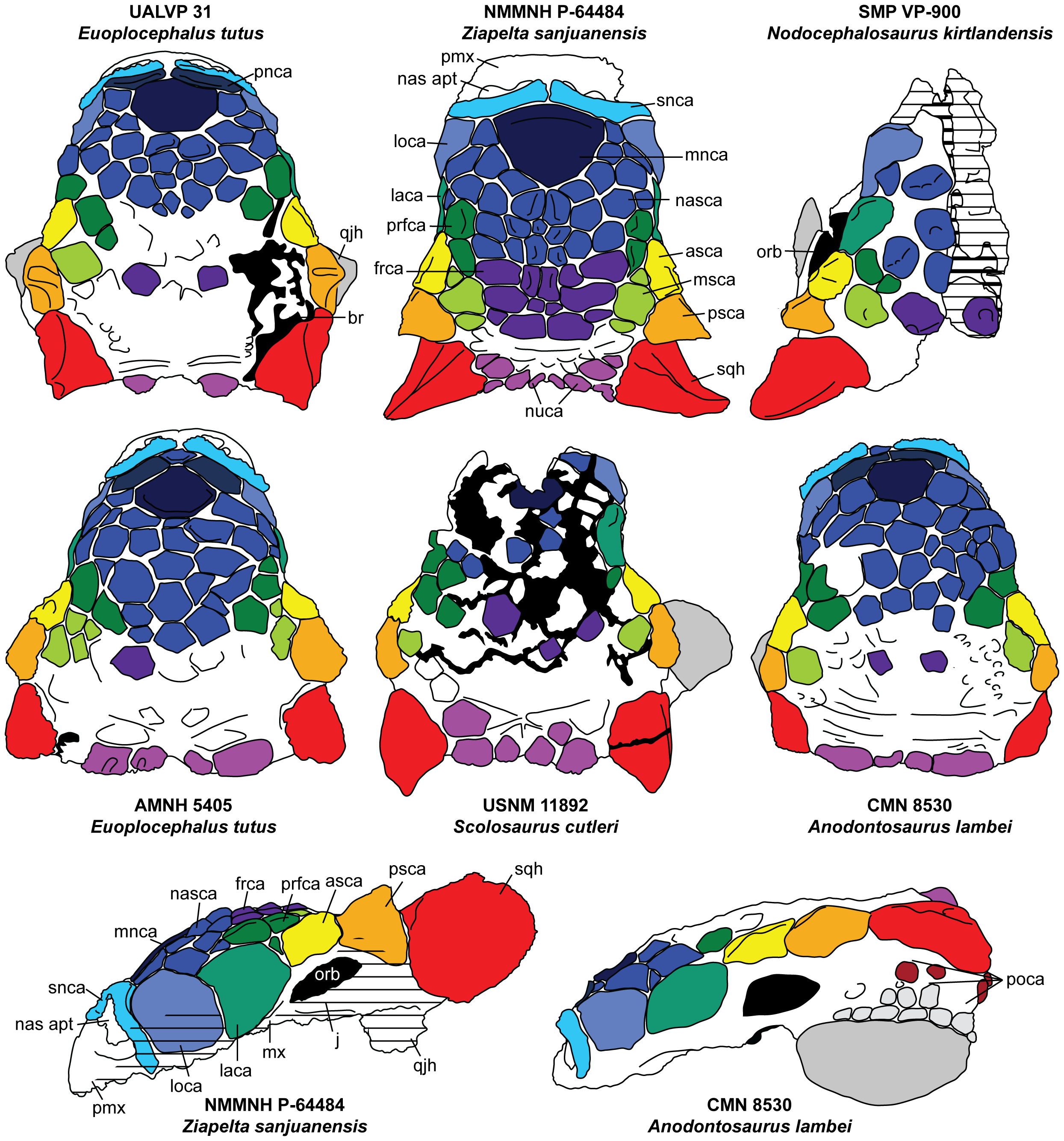
The caputegulae pattern in ankylosaurids; Ziapelta at the middle top and lower left

The skull has no constriction in front of the eye sockets and its widest point is formed by the squamosal horns on the top rear corners. The skull is rather flat and this is only to a small degree caused by compression of the fossil. The antorbital portion of the skull was lightly convex, and the premaxillae were broad and square, and covered in a rather flat cranial ornamentation. The nasal vestibules are oriented towards the front and shaped like flat ovals. The central caputegulae of the snout is exceptionally large, covering about half of the snout width whereas in other species possessing such a structure this is at most 40%. It is also triangular instead of hexagonal, which is the usual shape. Behind this central plate rows of smaller caputegulae run backwards; they have a diameter of about three centimetres each and are rectangular, pentagonal or hexagonal. The maxillae, the upper jaws, were 11.9 centimetres (4.7 in) long and contained about eighteen small teeth on each side. The outside of the maxilla was covered by a large loreal osteoderm, overlapping the snout edge. A large lacrimal plate is present behind it. The rim above the eye socket has two osteoderms, each forming a separate peak as with Asian ankylosaurids. The rear edge of the skull is ornamented by small osteoderms, oriented somewhat to the midline and gradually increasing in size towards the outside of the skull. The squamosal horns on the back corners of the skull were very high, thick and forward-curving. The shape of the cheek horns is unknown because of damage inflicted during the fossilisation process.

At the rear of the skull, the paroccipital processes are fused with the quadrates. The contact with the neck, the occipital condyle, is kidney-shaped with a smooth surface surrounded by a groove. In Ziapelta, the bones of the upper rear skull sides, the exoccipitalia, do not contribute to this condyle which is fully formed by the basioccipital, the lower rear braincase element. More to below this basioccipital shows three deep parallel grooves, bordered by four rims. The middle groove has the opening of the foramen basioccipitale. To the front the basioccipital contacts the triangular basisphenoid of the underside of the braincase. The two elements are not fully fused but in side view show a clear suture, obliquely running to below.

At the underside of the skull, the paired front praemaxillae form a bony secondary palate, with a concave surface. Each praemaxilla is pierced by two foramina. Both elements are at the snout tip separated by a gap, ending about thirty-five millimetres in front of the tip of the narrow and flat vomers at the midline. Behind the praemaxillae, the internal wings of the maxillae form the edges of the choanae, the internal nostrils. To the rear of the vomers, triangular palatine bones are located. These are not pierced by large fenestrae, though a triangular depression is present at their undersides.

=== Osteoderms ===
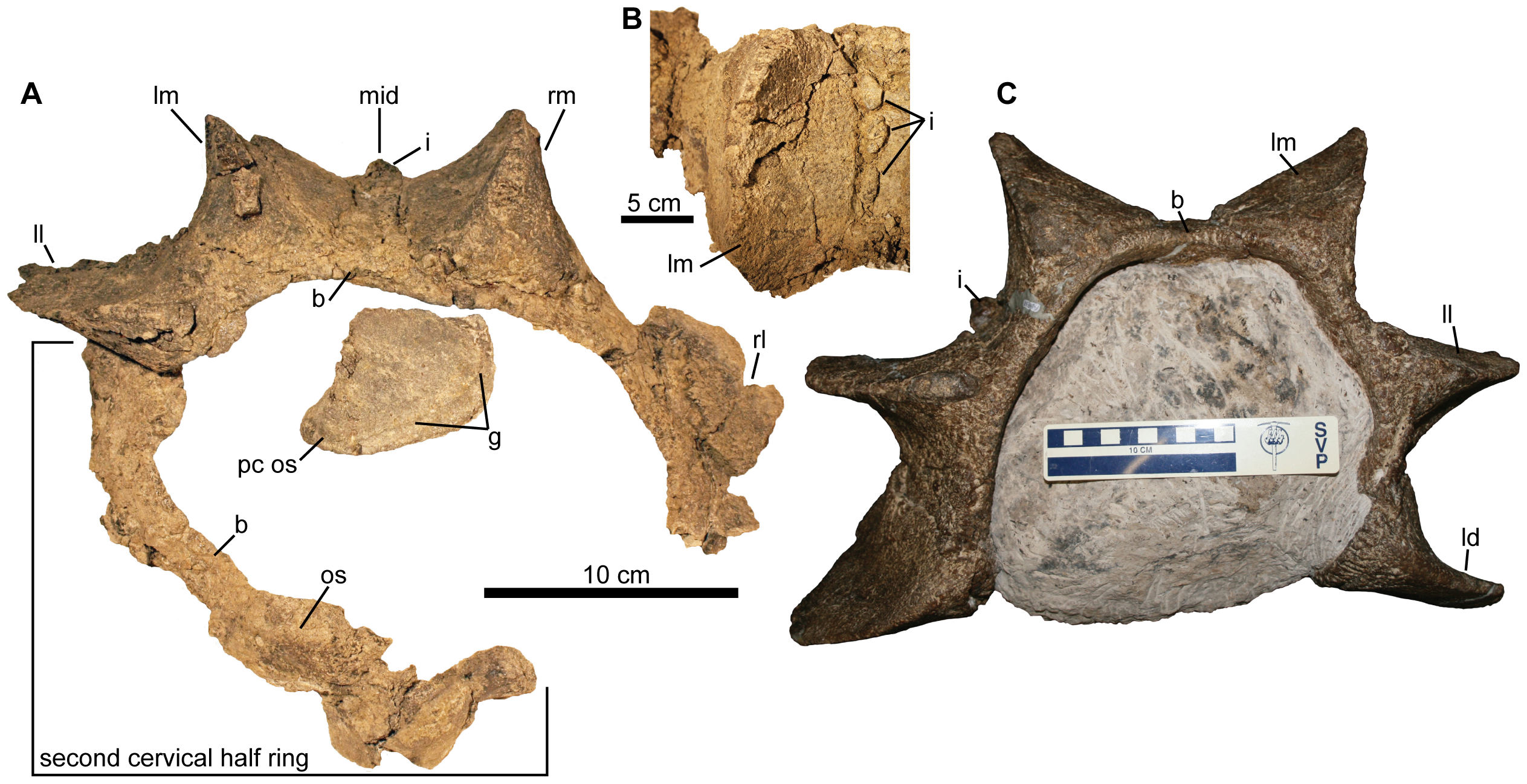
Three cervical half-rings

The body of Ziapelta was protected by osteoderms, scutes of bone that sit inside of the skin. Apart from the osteoderms that are part of the skull, two cervical halfrings were present to protect the upper side of the neck and rows of oval scutes probably ran along the back and sides of the torso; the latter are only known as detached specimens. All osteoderms found have a surface that is densely pitted but lacks veins.

The cervical halfrings of ankylosaurids typically consisted of six fused segments each, that were paired per side: one at the top, a second segment at the upper side and a third one at the lower side. These segments were fused to an underlying continuous bone ring. In Ziapelta the segments consisted of osteoderms that were in-between an oval and a rectangular shape. These osteoderms were keeled, featuring a high cutting edge. The osteoderms were between 146 and 169 millimetres long, between 58 and 104 millimetres wide and their keels varied between 2.4 centimetres (0.94 in) and 10.9 centimetres (4.3 in) tall. Where the middle segments touched each other on the midline, an irregular punctuated row of small trapezium-shaped "interstitial" osteoderms was present within the suture. At the front of the suture of the first cervical halfring, a small cone-shaped interstitial osteoderm protruded. Such interstitial elements were absent with the side segments.

Specimen NMMNH P-66930, a first cervical halfring, shared several traits with its counterpart of the holotype: high narrow keels, interstitial osteoderms in the middle and a lower side osteoderm that does not wrap around the lower edge. It was therefore referred to Z. sanjuanensis.

Several unconnected osteoderms have been discovered. One of these might originally have been part of a halfring. A second one was seen as originating from the pectoral, upper breast, region. A third, measuring 118 by 68 millimetres, had a narrow keel and the shark fin shape typical of the ankylosaurian side spikes and was thus identified as a lateral rump osteoderm. Some small ossicles were discovered also, round scutes of between two and four centimetres in cross-section, with a conical or flat shape and featuring a pitted surface. Their original position cannot be determined.

== Classification ==
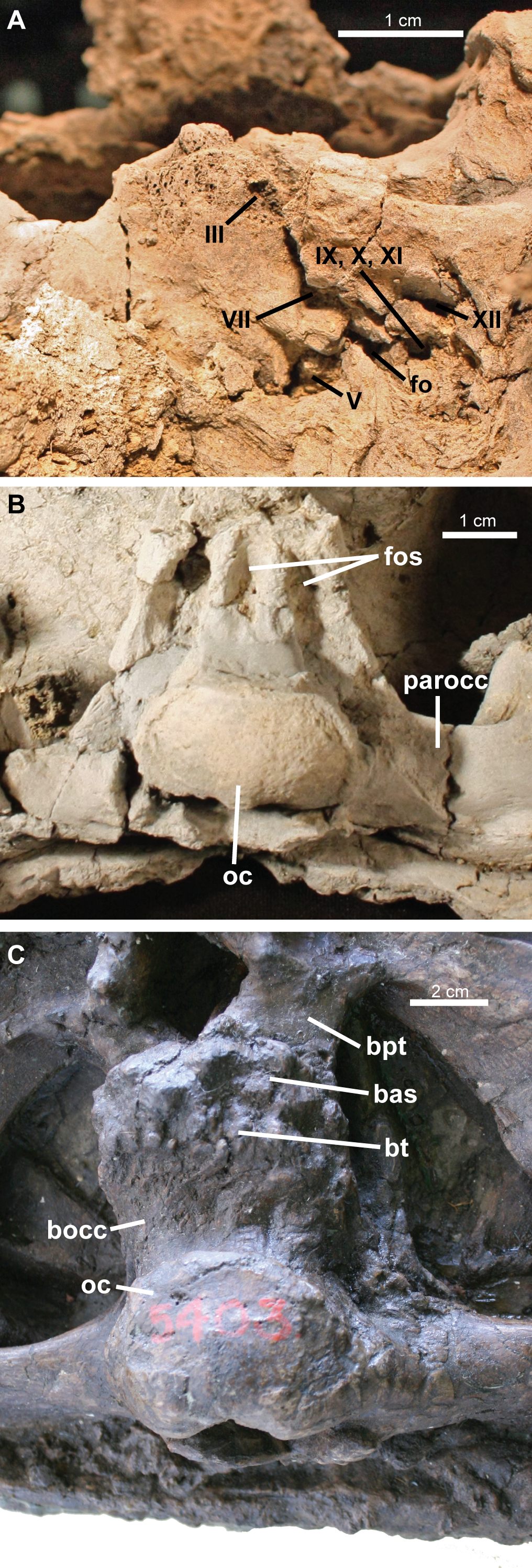
Braincase (A, B) compared to that of Euoplocephalus (C)

Ziapelta was placed in the Ankylosauridae, as possibly closely related to Scolosaurus from Canada, being its sister species in several of the evolutionary trees rendered by the cladistic analysis that was part of the describing paper. It thus was part of a clade also containing other American ankylosaurids. However it was not closely related to Nodocephalosaurus, which lived in the same time and area. The latter being recovered as a relative of East-Asian ankylosaurids. However, the authors indicated that an alternative tree in which Ziapelta and Nodocephalosaurus were forced to be sister species was just one evolutionary step longer, i.e. requiring the presence of but a single additional shared trait, and thus only slightly less likely.

The following cladogram is based on a 2015 phylogenetic analysis of Ankylosaurinae conducted by Arbour and Currie:

- Ankylosaurinae
  - Crichtonpelta
  - - Tsagantegia
    - Zhejiangosaurus
    - Pinacosaurus
    - - - Saichania
        - - Tarchia
          - Zaraapelta
      - Ankylosaurini
        - Dyoplosaurus
        - - - Talarurus
            - Nodocephalosaurus
          - - - Ankylosaurus
              - Anodontosaurus
            - Euoplocephalus
            - - Scolosaurus
              - Ziapelta

Since, Ziapelta and other Late Cretaceous North American ankylosaurids are grouped with Asian genera, in a tribe which the authors dubbed Ankylosaurini, Arbour and Currie suggested that earlier North American ankylosaurids had gone extinct by the late Albian or Cenomanian ages of the Middle Cretaceous. They propose that ankylosaurids subsequently recolonized North America from Asia during the Campanian or Turonian ages of the Late Cretaceous, and there diversified once more, leading to genera such as Euoplocephalus, Scolosaurus and Ziapelta

== Paleogeography ==
The relation between Nodocephalosaurus and Asian forms indicates a migration between Asia and Laramidia. Provincialism in the sense of a faunal separation between the northern and southern regions of Laramidia cannot be deduced from the fact that Ziapelta was not present in the habitat shared by its relatives Euoplocephalus, Dyoplosaurus, and Scolosaurus because Ziapelta stems from younger layers than these animals.

== See also ==
- Timeline of ankylosaur research
