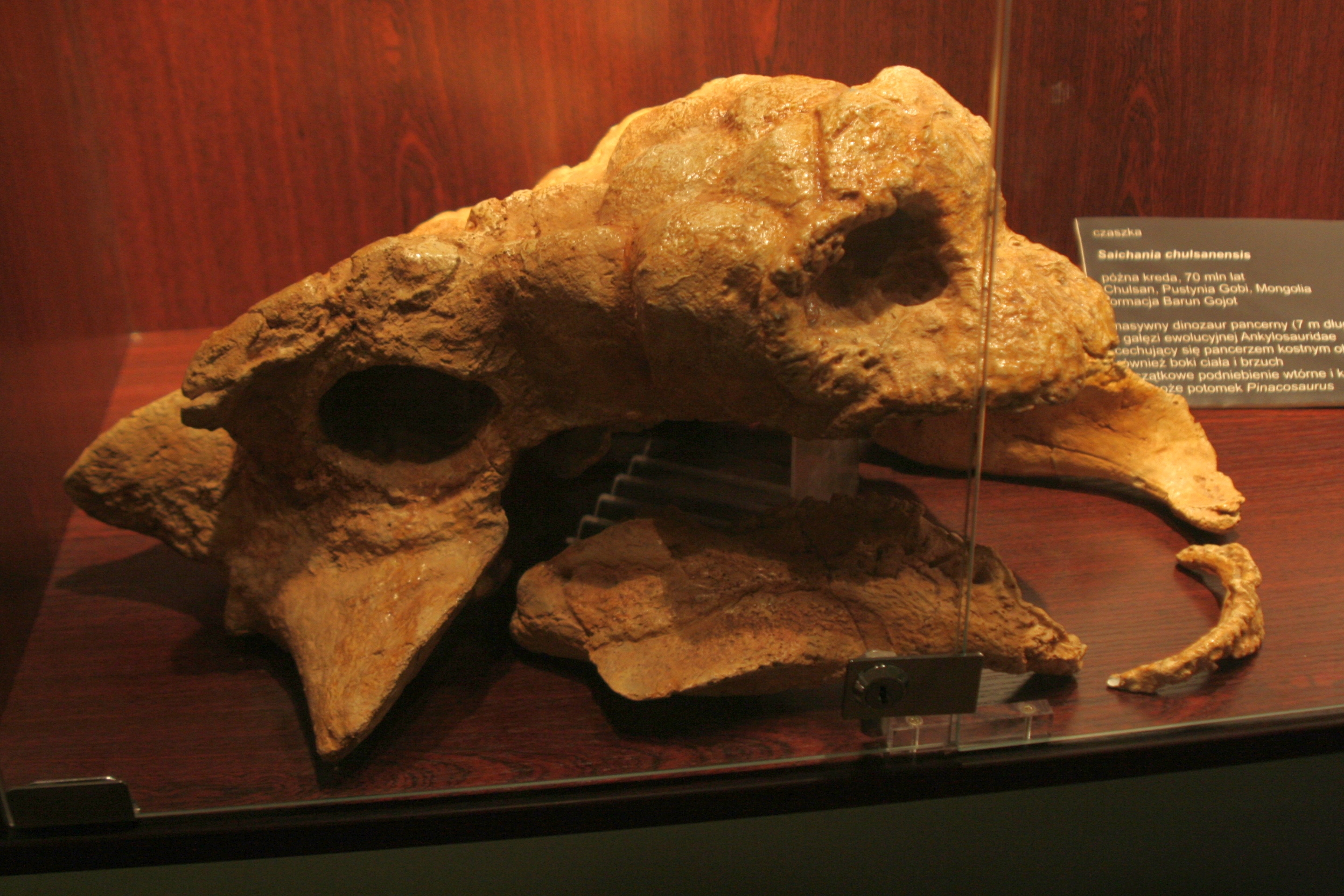
- Cast of holotype skull GI SPS 100/151

Scientific classification
- Kingdom: Animalia
- Phylum: Chordata
- Class: Reptilia
- Clade: Dinosauria
- Clade: †Ornithischia
- Clade: †Thyreophora
- Clade: †Ankylosauria
- Family: †Ankylosauridae
- Subfamily: †Ankylosaurinae
- Genus: †Saichania; Maryańska, 1977
- Species: †S. chulsanensis

Binomial name
- †Saichania chulsanensis Maryańska, 1977

Synonyms
- Tianzhenosaurus? Pang & Cheng, 1998; Shanxia? Barrett et al., 1998

= Saichania =

Saichania Temporal range: Late Cretaceous, Maastrichtian

Extinct genus of dinosaurs

Saichania (Mongolian meaning "beautiful one") is a genus of herbivorous ankylosaurid dinosaur from the Late Cretaceous period of Mongolia and China. The first fossils of Saichania were found in the early 1970s in the Baruungoyot Formation. In 1977, the type species Saichania chulsanensis was named.

Saichania is more robustly built than other members of the Ankylosauridae, measuring 5–7 metres (16–23 ft) in length and 1.4–2.0 metric tons (1.5–2.2 short tons) in body mass. Neck vertebrae, the shoulder girdle, and ribs were fused or firmly connected. Its body is flat and low-slung, standing on four short legs. The forelimbs were very powerful. The head was protected by bulbous armour tiles. It could defend itself against predators like Tarbosaurus with a tail club. On the torso, keeled osteoderms were present. Saichania bit off plants in its desert habitat with a horny beak and processed them in its wide hindgut.

== History of discovery ==
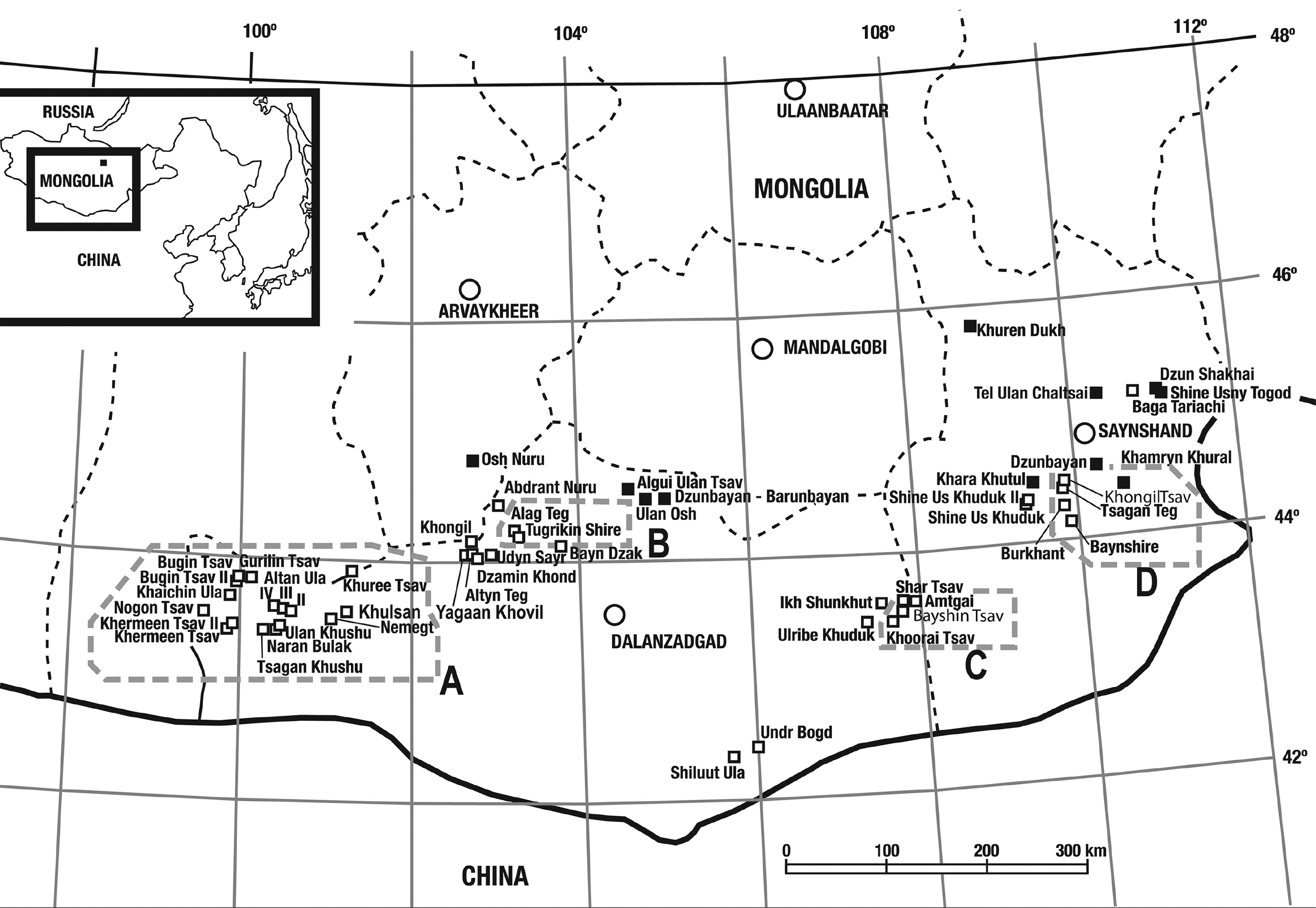
Cretaceous-aged dinosaur fossil localities of Mongolia; Saichania fossils were collected in area A

In 1970 and 1971 a Polish-Mongolian expedition found ankylosaurian fossils in the Gobi Desert near Chulsan, or Khulsan. The type species Saichania chulsanensis was named and described by the Polish palaeontologist Teresa Maryańska in 1977, along with the related species Tarchia kielanae. The generic name originates from the Mongolian сайхан (saikhan), meaning "beautiful", referring to the pristine state of preservation of the type specimen. The specific name refers to the provenance near Chulsa.

The holotype of Saichania chulsanensis, specimen GI SPS 100/151, was found in a layer of the Barun Goyot Formation, dating from the late Campanian, about seventy-three million years old. It consists of a skull and the anterior part of the postcranial skeleton: seven neck vertebrae, ten back vertebrae, the left shoulder girdle, the left forelimb, the two cervical halfrings and extensive armour in life position. The holotype is largely articulated. Referred specimens include ZPAL MgD-I/114 consisting of an undescribed fragmentary skull roof and associated armour, and an undescribed, almost complete skeleton with skull, specimen PIN 3142/251.

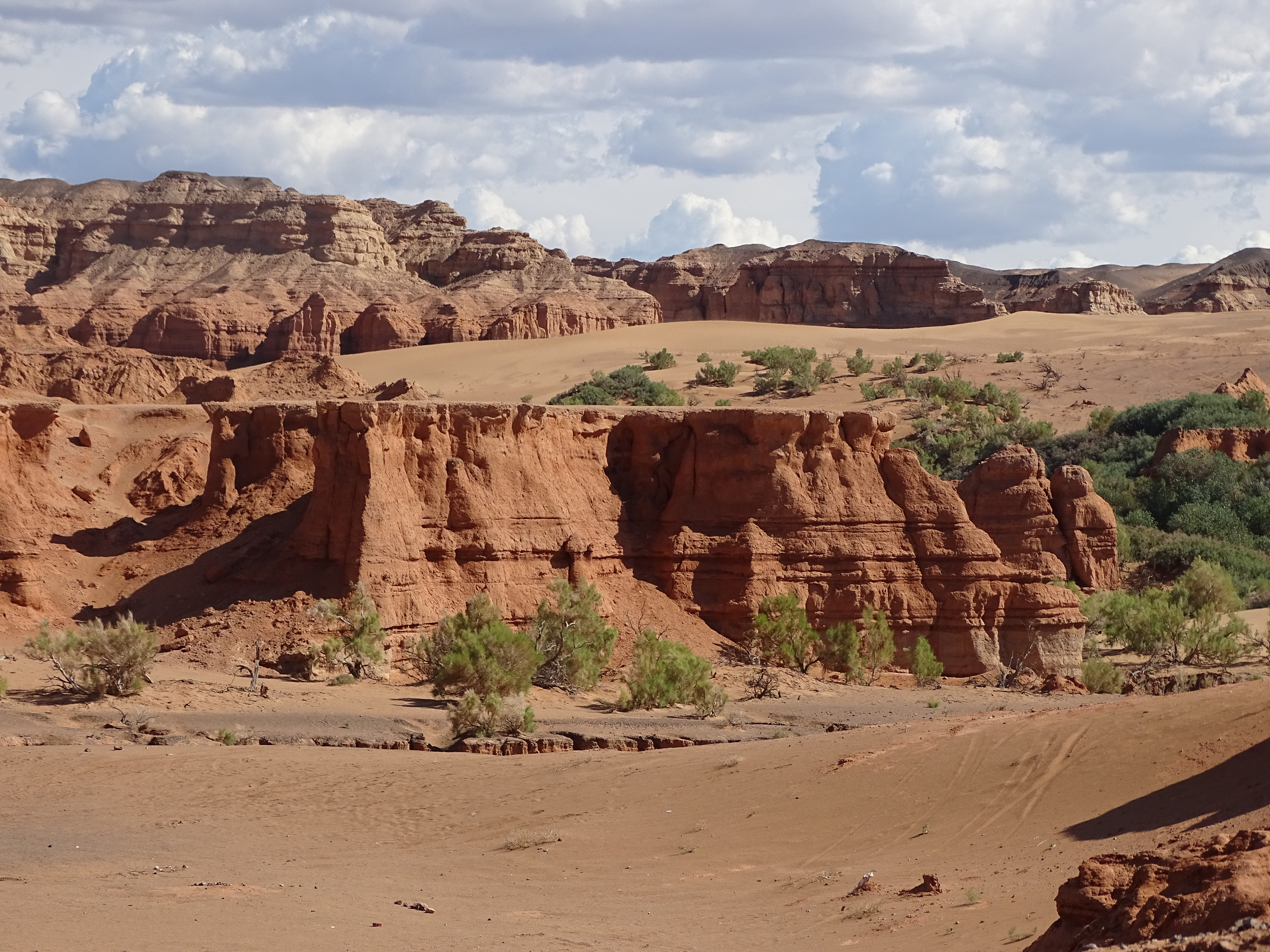
Barun Goyot Formation in Mongolia

Later, also the juvenile specimen MPC-D 100/1305 was referred and extensively described in 2011, seeming for the first time to provide complete information on the postcranial skeleton. However, in 2014 Victoria Megan Arbour concluded that the describers had been misled by the skeleton having been completed with a skull cast of GI SPS 100/151, and that the remainder of the fossil belonged to some other ankylosaur, possibly Pinacosaurus. On the other hand, Arbour added to the number of possible Saichania specimens by referring PIN 3142/250, a skull previously seen as a Tarchia exemplar. This would imply that Saichania, formerly thought to occur solely in the Barun Goyot Formation at Khulsan, is also known from the Nemegt Formation at Khermeen Tsav. Saichania would then be the only ankylosaur definitely known from the Nemegt, its occurrence thus spanning the time of the Campanian–Maastrichtian transition, and early Maastrichtian (Nemegtian) period. Arbour also considered the Chinese taxa Tianzhenosaurus youngi Pang & Cheng 1998 and Shanxia tianzhenensis Barrett, You, Upchurch & Burton 1998 to be junior synonyms of Saichania. The referral of PIN 3142/250 to Saichania was contested by Penkalski & Tumanova who considered this specimen to be referable to a new species of Tarchia, T. teresae.

== Description ==
=== Size, build and distinguishing traits ===
Size comparison of GI SPS 100/151 and MPC-D 100/1305

Saichania was a medium-sized ankylosaur, measuring 5–7 metres (16–23 ft) in length and 1.4–2.0 metric tons (1.5–2.2 short tons) in body mass. Finds of tail clubs of gigantic individuals suggest larger sizes but their reference to Saichania cannot be substantiated as the holotype, the only specimen sufficiently described, only consists of the front of the animal.

Saichania shared the general ankylosaurid build, being a low-slung, broad, heavily armoured dinosaur, with short forelimbs. Even for an ankylosaurid however, Saichania is exceptionally robust, its rump strengthened by ossifications and fusions of the vertebral column, ribs, shoulder girdle and breast bones.

Arbour in 2014 established a revised list of distinguishing traits. The osteoderms on the skull are bulbous. The first and second neck vertebrae are fused into a single element, a syncervical. The upper side of the humerus is very broad, equalling 70% of the total length of the bone. The rib shafts are expanded by intercostal ossifications, the cartilage connecting the ribs having been turned into bone sheets. The cervical halfrings, protecting the neck, have each an underlying continuous band of bone and the borders between the segments of these rings are covered by extra armour plates entirely hiding these connections from view.

=== Skull ===
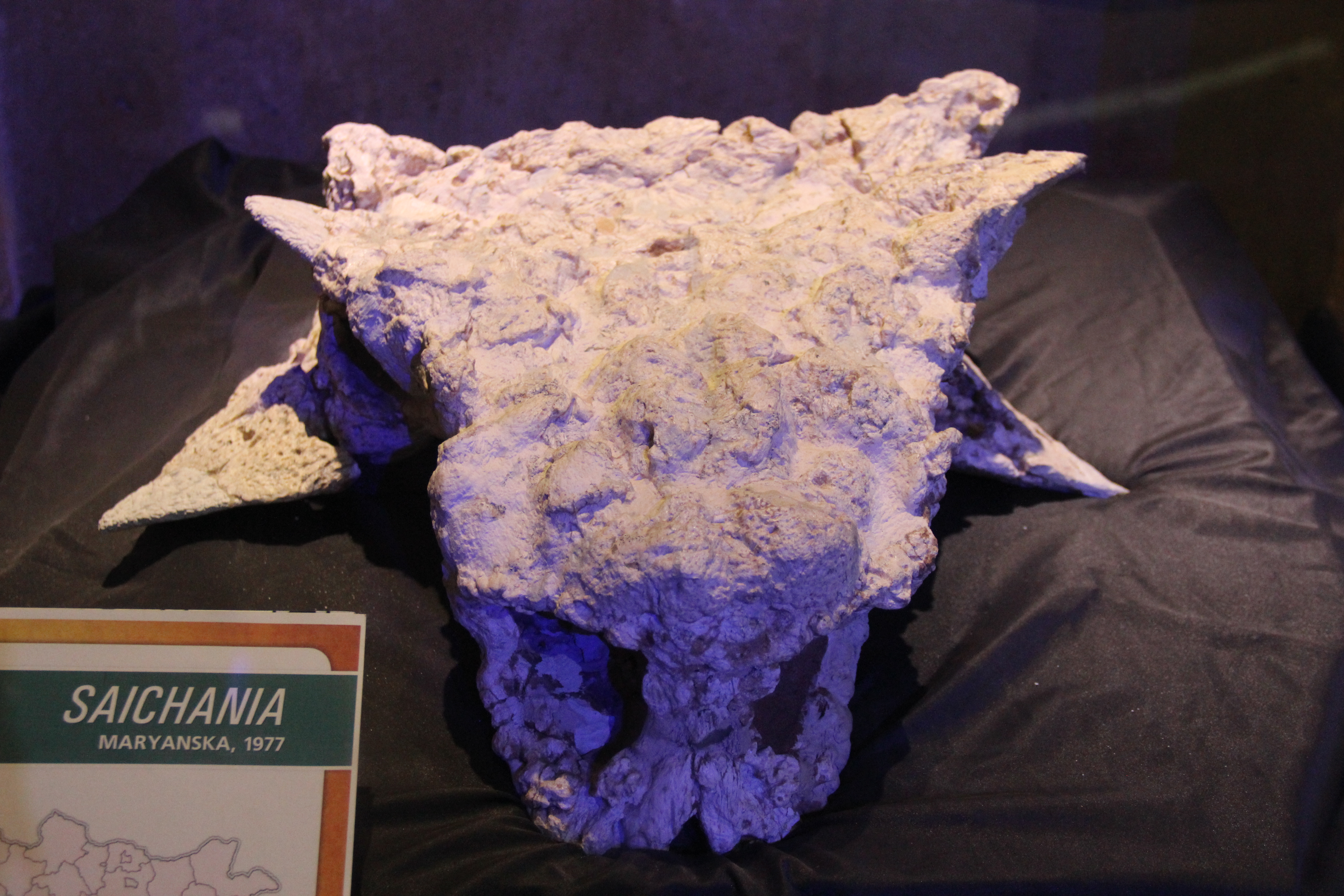
Skull in front view

The skull of Saichania is broad, 455 millimetres long and 480 millimetres wide with the holotype. The top of the snout is covered with strongly convex osteoderms. These armour tiles on the snout comprise a central large caputegula. A large "loreal" osteoderm covers much of the top edge and the side of the snout. The caputegula on the prefrontal is of moderate size and not strongly protruding sideways. The osteoderms on the upper eye socket rim are continuous, not forming two peaks. An extra osteoderm on the rear supraorbital, as in Tarchia, is lacking. The pyramid-shaped squamosal horns on the rear skull corners are broad, not narrow as with Tarchia. These horns have a uniform surface texture, not a division into a smooth and rough surface as in Zaraapelta. On the cheek, large triangular quadratojugal horns are present.

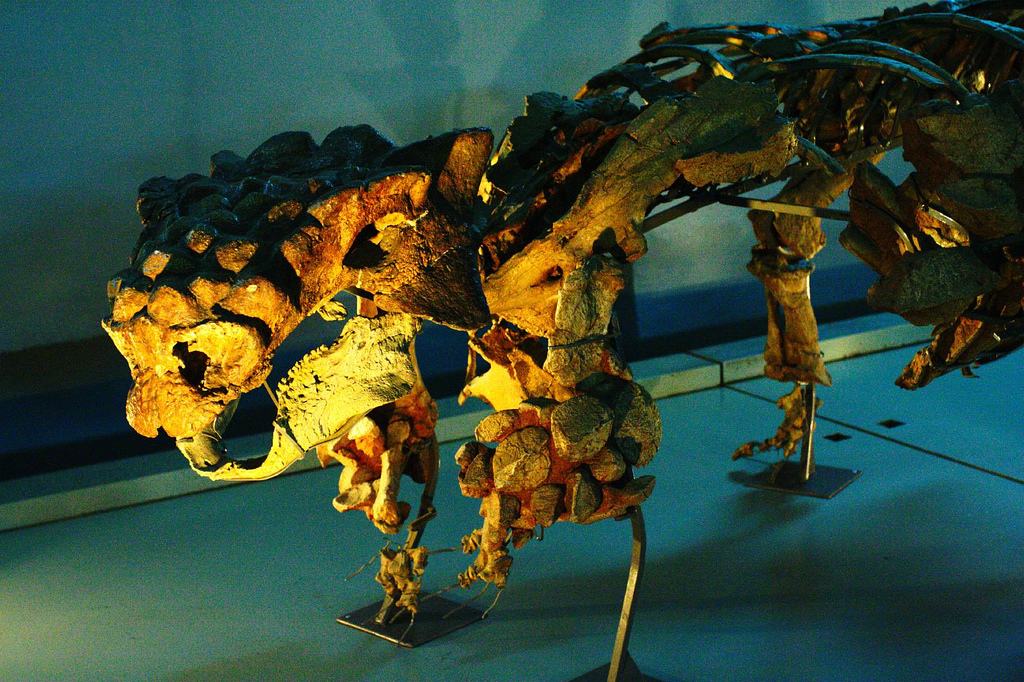
Saichania skull cast mounted on the skeleton of cf. Pinacosaurus in Mongolia

The skull had very complex air passages. The main entrance of each external nostril consisted of a roomy "nasal vestibule". In each vestibule again two smaller entrances were present, vertically arranged. The lower hole allowed air to enter the hollow inside of the bone core of the beak. This premaxillary sinus had a little recess at the top, connected by a nerve channel to the mouth. Maryańska presumed this recess housed a Jacobson's organ, a secondary smelling organ. The main room of the premaxillary sinus was connected to behind with a sinus in the maxilla, which itself was partly divided in two by a transverse bone wall or septum. The nasal cavity was large, situated directly below the snout roof. It was divided into a left and right side by a thick vertical bone wall. It was also horizontally divided in two by high internal wings of the praemaxillae and the upper side of a crista maxilloturbinalis. This latter was a scroll-like structure, a turbinate bone serving with warm-blooded animals to condense and preserve exhaled moisture. Normally, in dinosaurs these turbinates are not ossified. Together with a crista nasoturbinalis, the crista maxilloturbinalis filled the lower half of the nasal cavity. Maryańska presumed it was connected with the underlying premaxillary sinus, allowing the animal to exhale air through the lower hole of the nasal vestibule. The upper half of the nasal cavity was the main respiratory tract, allowing air to enter via the upper hole of the nasal vestibule. An unusually strongly ossified hard palate was present. The air passages may have allowed the animal to cool the air that it breathed and limit water loss. The hard palate allowed it to eat tough plants. All this suggested that it lived in a hot, arid, environment. There is even some evidence that the animal may have possessed a salt gland next to its nostrils, which would have further aided it in a desert habitat.

The teeth were small and leaf-shaped. There are twenty-two of them in each maxilla, seventeen in the right and sixteen in the left lower jaw of the holotype. On the rear skull, the oval occipital condyle is obliquely pointing to below, indicating that the entire head was appending. A large hyoid bone apparatus was found, in 1977 the most complete discovered for any dinosaur. It is V-shaped with the central parts representing the basihyal and basibranchial, and the branches being the ceratobranchialia. This bone apparently supported a long tongue.

=== Postcranial skeleton ===
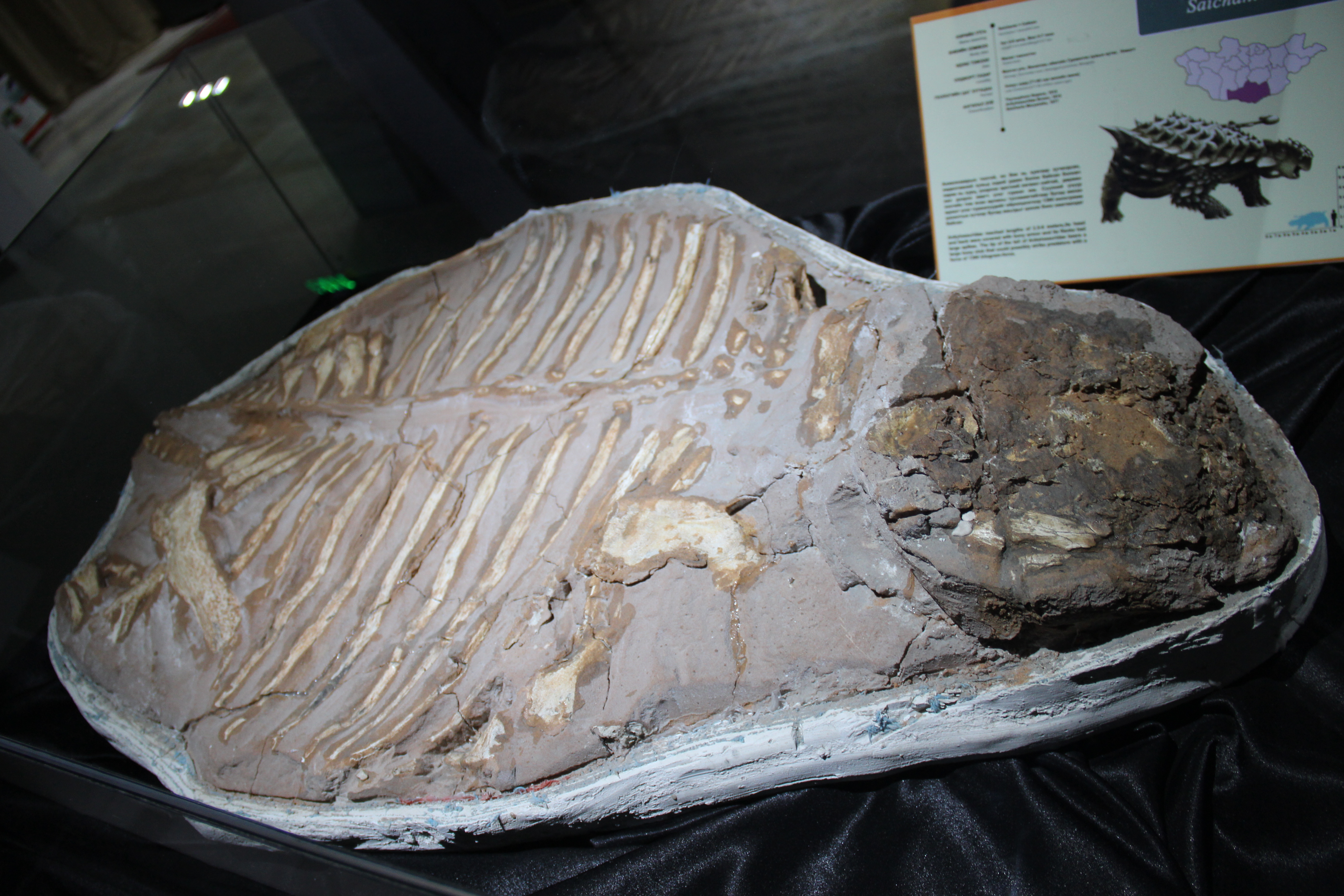
Skeleton in Central Museum of Mongolian Dinosaurs

The front skeleton shows some exceptional ossifications and fusions. The front neck vertebrae, the atlas and axis, are grown together. The cervical vertebrae have very long joint processes, zygapophyses, showing that thick intervertebral discs must have been present and that the neck was longer and more flexible than is often assumed. The short rib and the diapophysis of the first dorsal vertebra are fused with the coracoid, immobilising the entire shoulder girdle relative to the vertebral column. The coracoids are small but sharply curving to the inside below, almost meeting each other. From the fifth rib onwards, the rib shafts have intercostal plates on their rear edges, ossified cartilage sheets, overlapping the front edge of the next rib. The intercostal plate is positioned in a relatively high position in the fifth rib; more to the rear of the series it gradually descends towards the lower belly. These ribs also articulate at their lower ends with the breast bones, a condition which is rare in the Ornithischia. The breast bones are fully ossified and connect to form a sternal plate that is split in front and broadly forked at the rear.

The humerus is very robust. Thirty centimetres long in the holotype, it has an upper side width of 212 millimetres due to a well-developed inner corner and a strong hatchet-shaped deltopectoral crest. The ulna, twenty-one centimetres in length, also is robust but has a relatively low olecranon. The metacarpus is short, in 1977 it was the shortest of any Asian ankylosaur known. The metacarpals were positioned vertically, closely connected into an arch. Below the first and second metacarpal small disc-shaped sesamoid bones were found.

=== Body armour ===
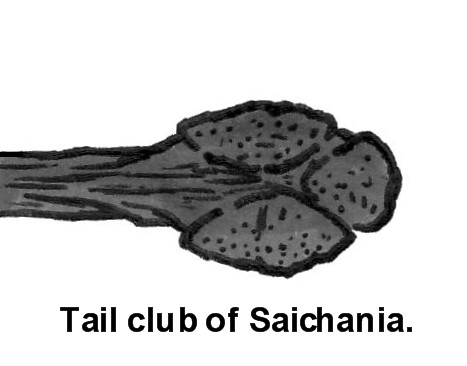
Illustration of the tail club

The holotype preserves the front body armour in articulation. The neck is protected by two cervical halfrings, each made of six rectangular segments positioned next to each other: two at the top, two at the upper sides and two at the lower sides. Each segment has a keel parallel to the long axis of the body. The keel of the lower side segments is the largest. The segments are connected to an underlying continuous band of bone, mainly by a broad fusion at the front edge, but also by a narrow strip at the rear. The seams between the segments are covered by a rectangular zone of small oval osteoderms. Between the upper and lower side segment a larger central osteoderm is present, forming a rosette. The front halfring is smaller than the rear one.

A central row of symmetrical conical osteoderms is positioned on the back. On both sides of this median series, a parallel row of large thin osteoderms is present, featuring moderately high keels, their apexes pointing to behind. The vertical sides of the rump are covered by three rows of conical osteoderms: the upper rim is equipped with large plates and apexes pointing to the rear; at the middle side a similar row is present of even larger plates; the lower edge has a row of smaller plates, their keels to the contrary directed to the front. In general, the keels are sharp and narrower plates have higher and more asymmetrically placed keels. Some osteoderms have the shape of pure cones. The larger osteoderms are also ordered in transverse rows but are not fused into bands; small ossicles connect the larger elements. On the underside of the breast, osteoderms are present also.

== Classification ==
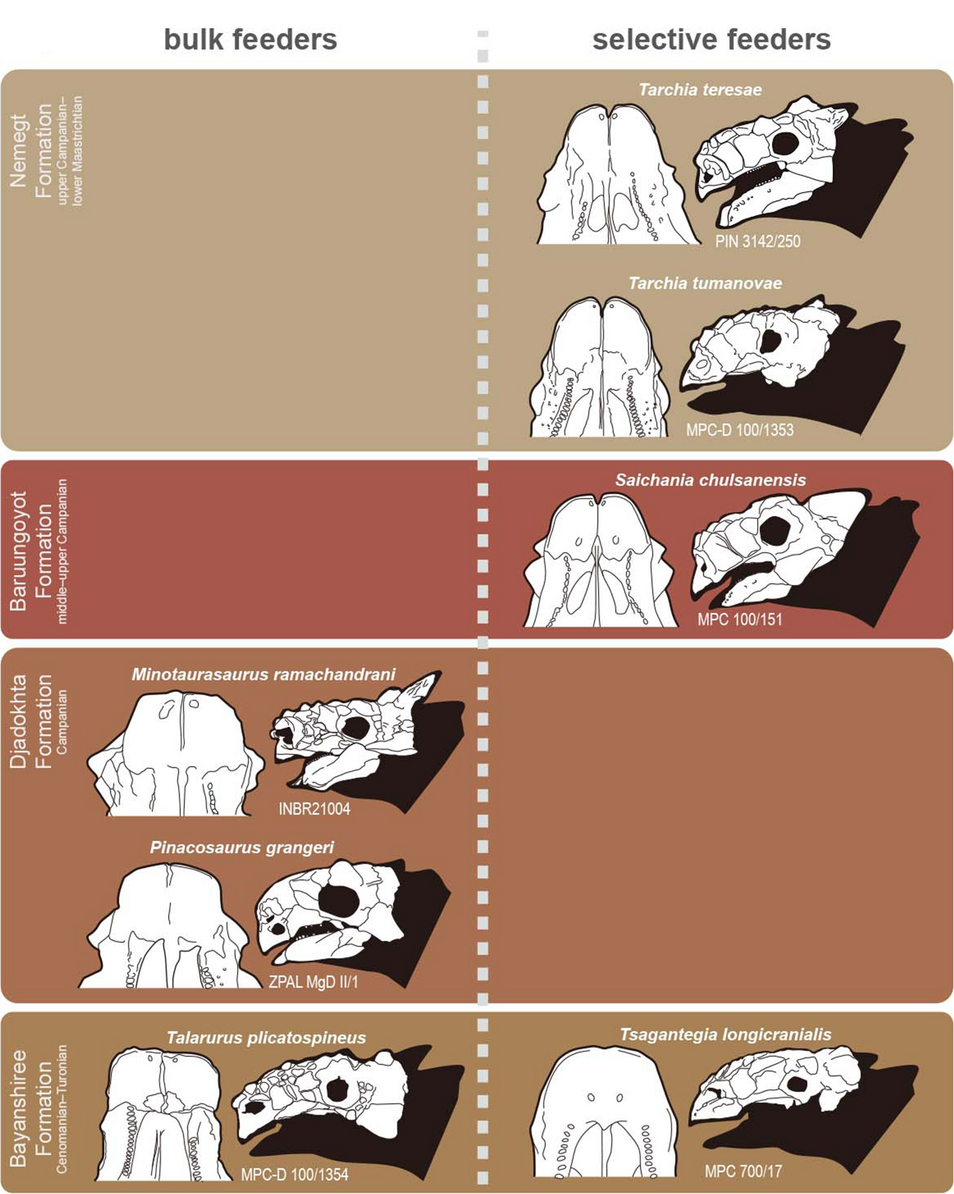
Comparisons of Mongolian ankylosaurines and their dietary categories through time

Maryańska classified Saichania as a member of the Ankylosauridae, related to Pinacosaurus and observed that these two dinosaurs differ from all others in the structure of their nasal cavities. Maryańska provided a differential diagnosis that showed that the two genera were distinct based on morphological differences observed in the bones of the skull and braincase. Later cladistic analyses recovered a position in the Ankylosaurinae, often close to Tarchia, which is not surprising given that the Operational Taxonomic Unit of the latter was typically based on specimen PIN 3142/250, now referred to Saichania. However, even if the Tarchia OTU is based on its holotype only, it is still closely related to Saichania.

A phylogenetic analysis conducted by Arbour & Evans (2017) is reproduced below.

- Ankylosaurinae
  - Zhejiangosaurus luoyangensis
  - - - Pinacosaurus grangeri
      - Pinacosaurus mephistocephalus
    - - - Tsagantegia longicranialis
        - - Talarurus plicatospineus
          - Nodocephalosaurus kirtlandensis
      - - - Saichania chulsanensis
          - - Zaraapelta nomadis
            - Tarchia kielanae
        - Ankylosaurini
          - Ziapelta sanjuanensis
          - - Euoplocephalus tutus
            - - Ankylosaurus magniventris
              - - Anodontosaurus lambei
                - - Scolosaurus cutleri
                  - - Zuul crurivastator
                    - Dyoplosaurus acutosquameus

The results of an earlier analysis by Arbour & Currie (2015) is reproduced below.

- Ankylosaurinae
  - Crichtonpelta
  - - Tsagantegia
    - Zhejiangosaurus
    - Pinacosaurus
    - - - Saichania
        - - Tarchia
          - Zaraapelta
      - Ankylosaurini
        - Dyoplosaurus
        - - - Talarurus
            - Nodocephalosaurus
          - - - Ankylosaurus
              - Anodontosaurus
            - Euoplocephalus
            - - Scolosaurus
              - Ziapelta

== Paleobiology ==
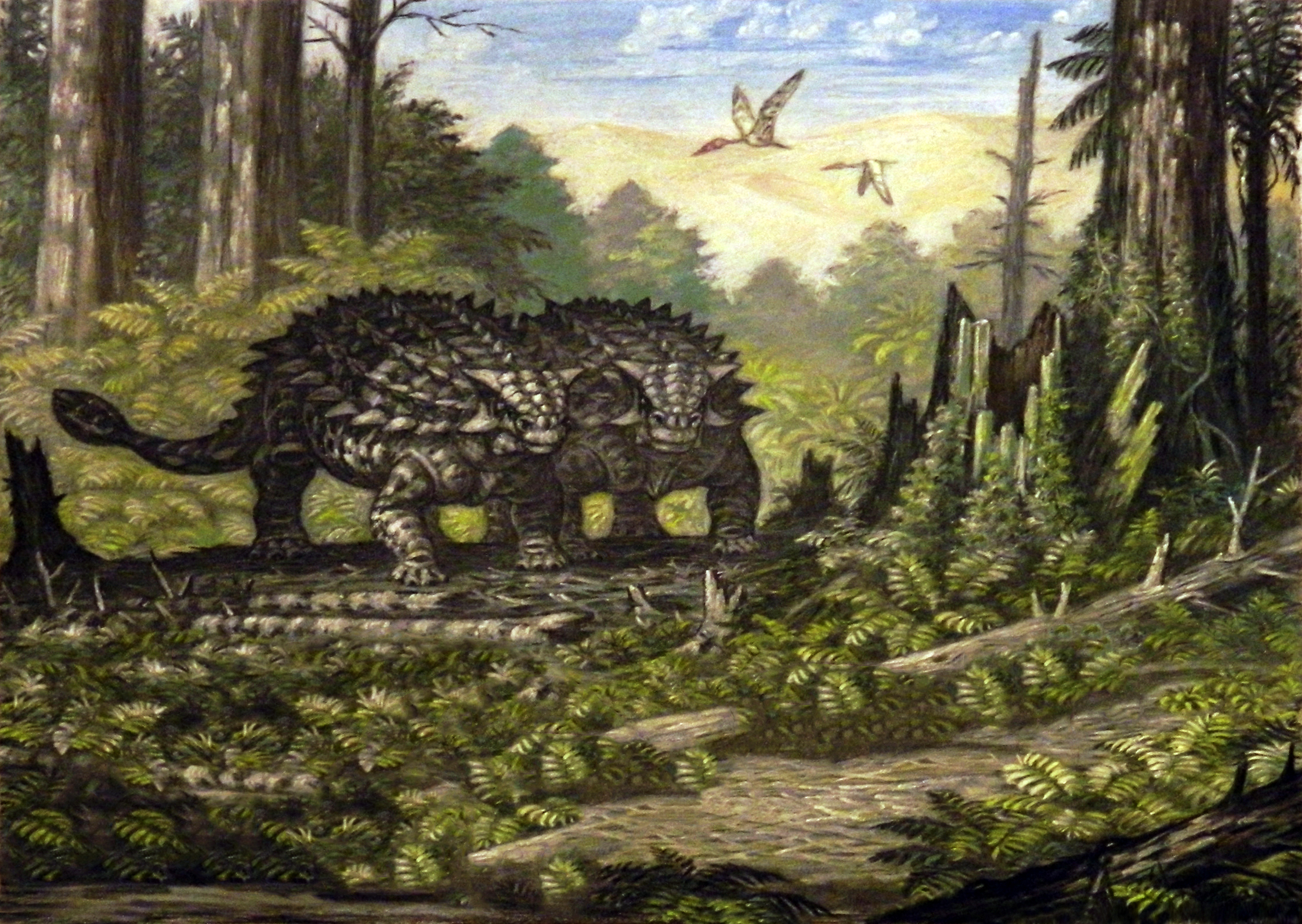
Artist's illustration of two Saichania in their habitat

Saichania lived in a desert habitat, with sand dunes interspersed with oases. Other dinosaurs present in the Barun goyot included Lamaceratops, Bagaceratops and Tylocephale; large theropods have not been found yet. In the later Nemegt the gigantic predator Tarbosaurus was present.

Arbour pointed out that Saichania, Tarchia and Zaraapelta shared the same habitat. She assumed that this relative ankylosaurian abundance in species had been caused by them being the main herbivores in the area, enough crop thus being available to feed three populations, although their relative niches were unclear. The differences in head ornamentation would then have served species recognition. She saw no indications of sexual dimorphism.

== See also ==
- Timeline of ankylosaur research
