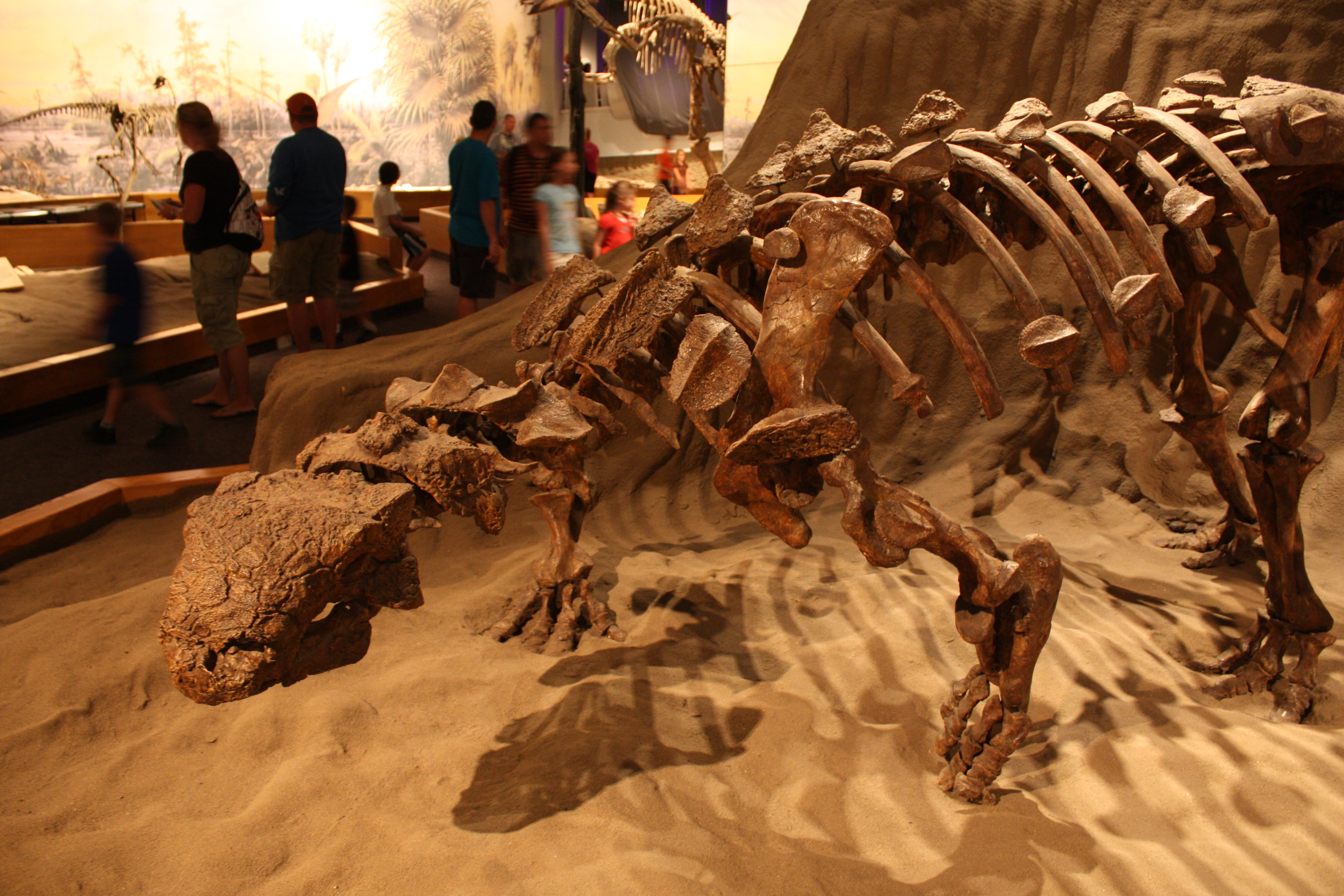
- Mounted skeleton of Scolosaurus thronus, Royal Tyrrell Museum of Palaeontology

Scientific classification
- Kingdom: Animalia
- Phylum: Chordata
- Class: Reptilia
- Clade: Dinosauria
- Clade: †Ornithischia
- Clade: †Thyreophora
- Clade: †Ankylosauria
- Clade: †Euankylosauria
- Family: †Ankylosauridae; Brown, 1908

Type species
- †Ankylosaurus magniventris Brown, 1908

Subgroups
- †Aletopelta; †Cedarpelta; †Chuanqilong; †Huaxiazhoulong; †Liaoningosaurus; †Maleevus?; †Shamosaurinae Tumanova, 1983; †Gobisaurus; †Shamosaurus; †Ankylosaurinae

Synonyms
- Syrmosauridae Maleev, 1952

= Ankylosauridae =

Ankylosaurids Temporal range: Early–Late Cretaceous, 122–66 Ma

Extinct family of dinosaurs

Ankylosauridae (/ˌæŋkɪloʊˈsɔːrɪdiː/) is a family of armored dinosaurs within Ankylosauria, and is the sister group to Nodosauridae. The oldest known ankylosaurids date to around 122 million years ago, and the clade went extinct 66 million years ago during the Cretaceous–Paleogene extinction event. These animals were mainly herbivorous and were obligate quadrupeds, with leaf-shaped teeth and robust, scute-covered bodies. Ankylosaurids possess a distinctly domed and short snout, wedge-shaped osteoderms on their skull, scutes along their torso, and a tail club.

Ankylosauridae is exclusively known from the Northern Hemisphere, with specimens found in North America, Europe, and Asia. The first discoveries within this family were of the genus Ankylosaurus, by Peter Kaiser and Barnum Brown in Montana in 1906. Brown went on to name Ankylosauridae and the subfamily Ankylosaurinae in 1908.

== Anatomy ==
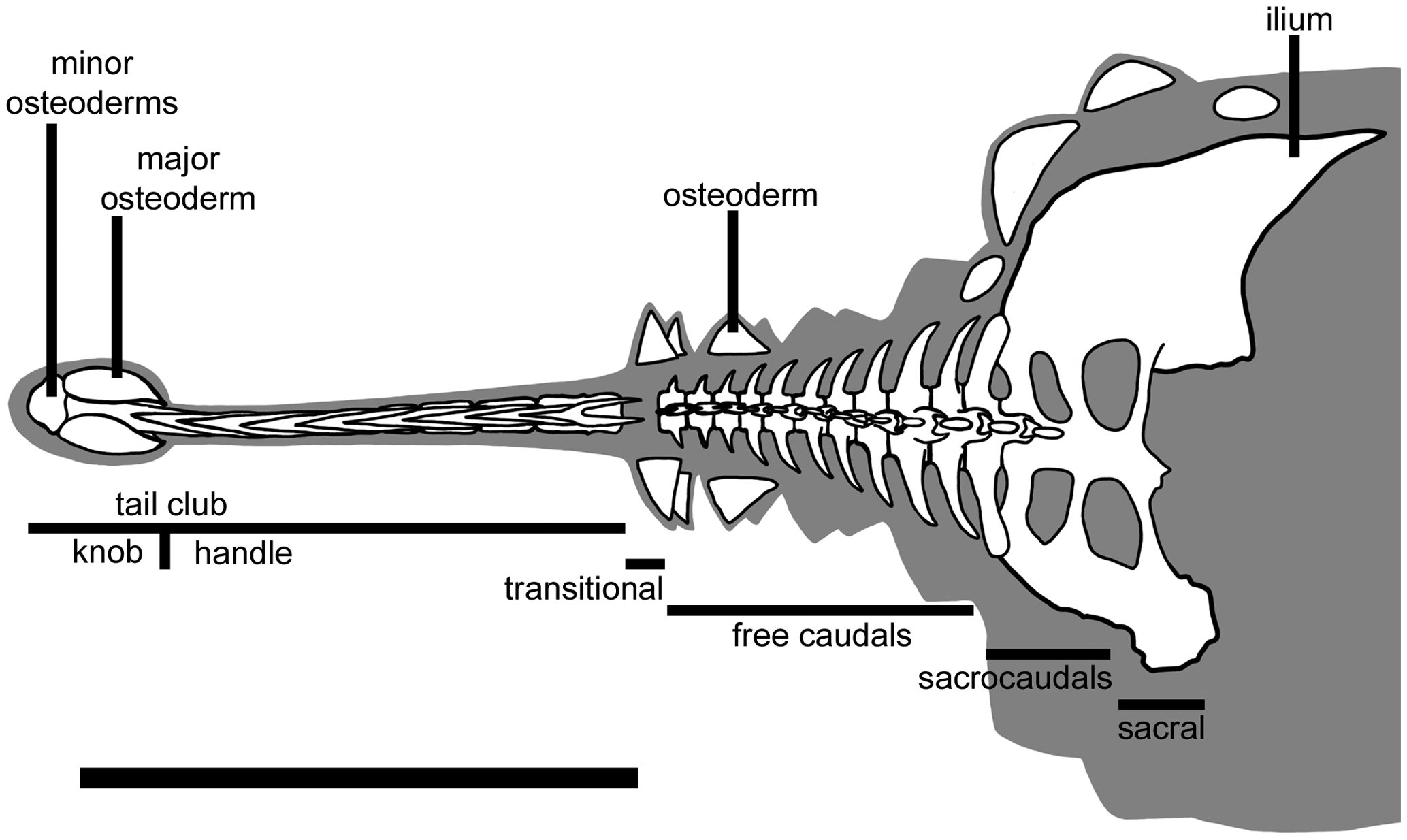
Dyoplosaurus tail reconstruction, showing terms used for parts of ankylosaurid tails

Ankylosaurids are stout, solidly built, armoured dinosaurs. They possess accessory ossifications on cranial bones that cover some skull openings and form wedge-shaped, horn-like structures. Along the ankylosaurid torso are scute rows, which are filled in with smaller ossicles to create a fused shield of armour. Only two collars of armour plates can be found on the neck, as opposed to the sister group, nodosaurids, which have three. Nodosauridae and Ankylosauridae also share the unique attribute of abundant structural fibres in both primary and secondary bone. Ankylosaurids also have an S-shaped narial passage.

The most distinguishing feature of ankylosaurids is the presence of a tail club. It is made out of modified interlocking distal caudal vertebrae and enlarged, bulbous osteoderms. The "handle" of the tail club involves the vertebrae, and requires elongated prezygapophyses to overlap at least half of the preceding vertebral centrum length. These distal caudal vertebrae also lack transverse processes and neural spines, and therefore tend to be longer than they are wide; the reverse is true for proximal caudal vertebrae. Derived ankylosaurids possess a fusion of posterior dorsal, sacral, and sometimes anterior caudal vertebrae, which forms a singular structure called a "synsacrum complex". There is a complete fusion between centra, neural arches, zygapophyses, and sometimes neural spines.

In 2017, Victoria M. Arbour and David C. Evans described a new genus of ankylosaurine that preserved extensive soft tissues along the body. This animal, named Zuul after its resemblance to the Ghostbusters monster, is also the first ankylosaur from the Judith River Formation.

== History of study ==
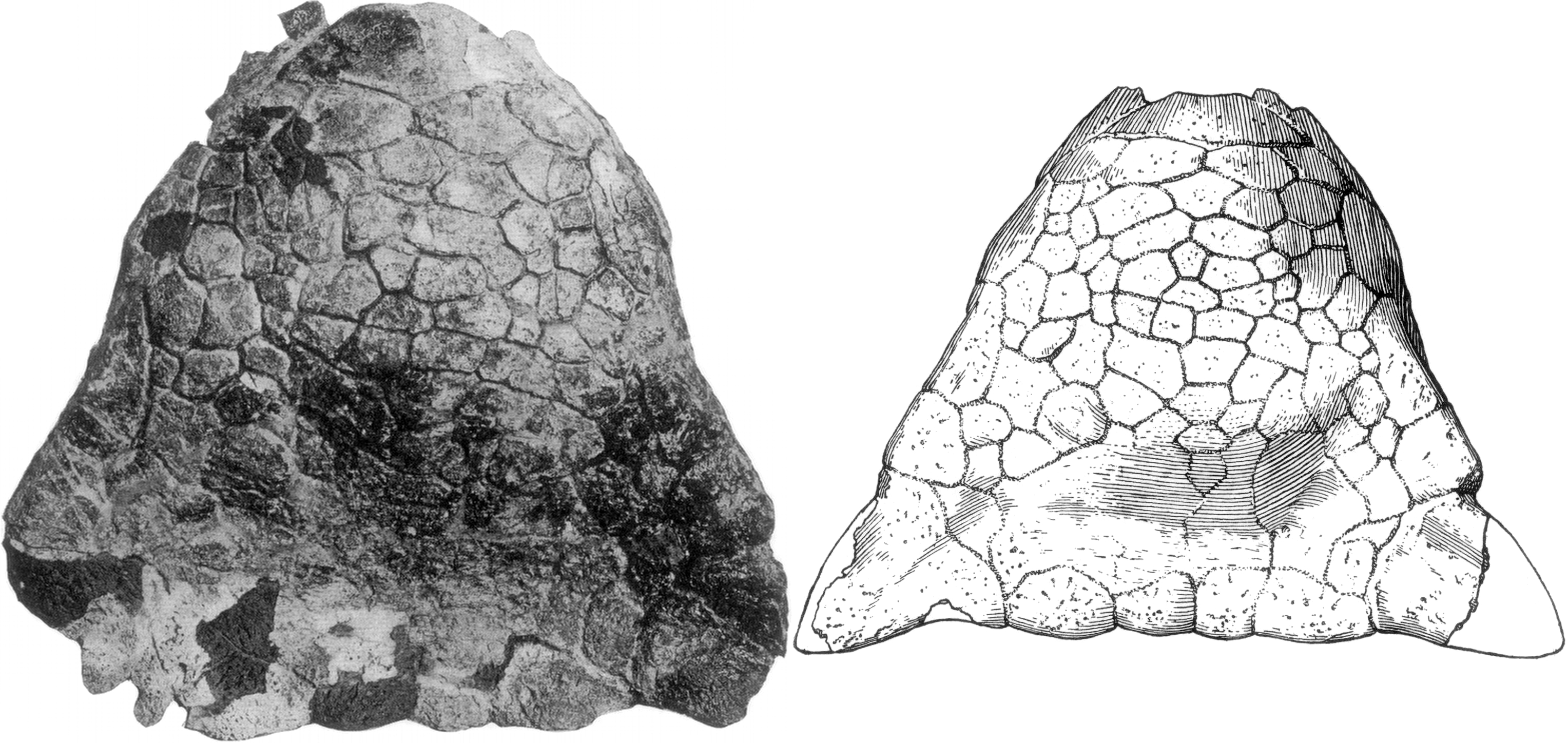
Skull of first known ankylosaurid specimen, belonging to Ankylosaurus

Barnum Brown and Peter Kaisen discovered the first ankylosaurid genus, Ankylosaurus, in 1906 in the Hell Creek Beds in Montana. The fossil material they found was a portion of the skull, two teeth, some vertebrae, a distorted scapula, ribs and more than thirty osteoderms. Reconstruction of the specimen was initially met with skepticism by those who believed it to be at least very close to, or completely a part of the genus Stegopelta, and Brown himself placed it within the suborder Stegosauria.

It has previously been interpreted that variation in ankylosaurid tail club shape is due to sexual dimorphism, which assumes that tail club morphology has a sex-linked intraspecific function. This is possible if the tail club was used for agonistic behaviour. However, a sexual dimorphism theory would predict roughly equal numbers of individuals with two distinct sizes of tail clubs. Obvious sexual dimorphism has not been documented, but if the clubs of one sex are much larger, then there would be a bias for preservation and discovery towards that sex.

== Phylogeny ==
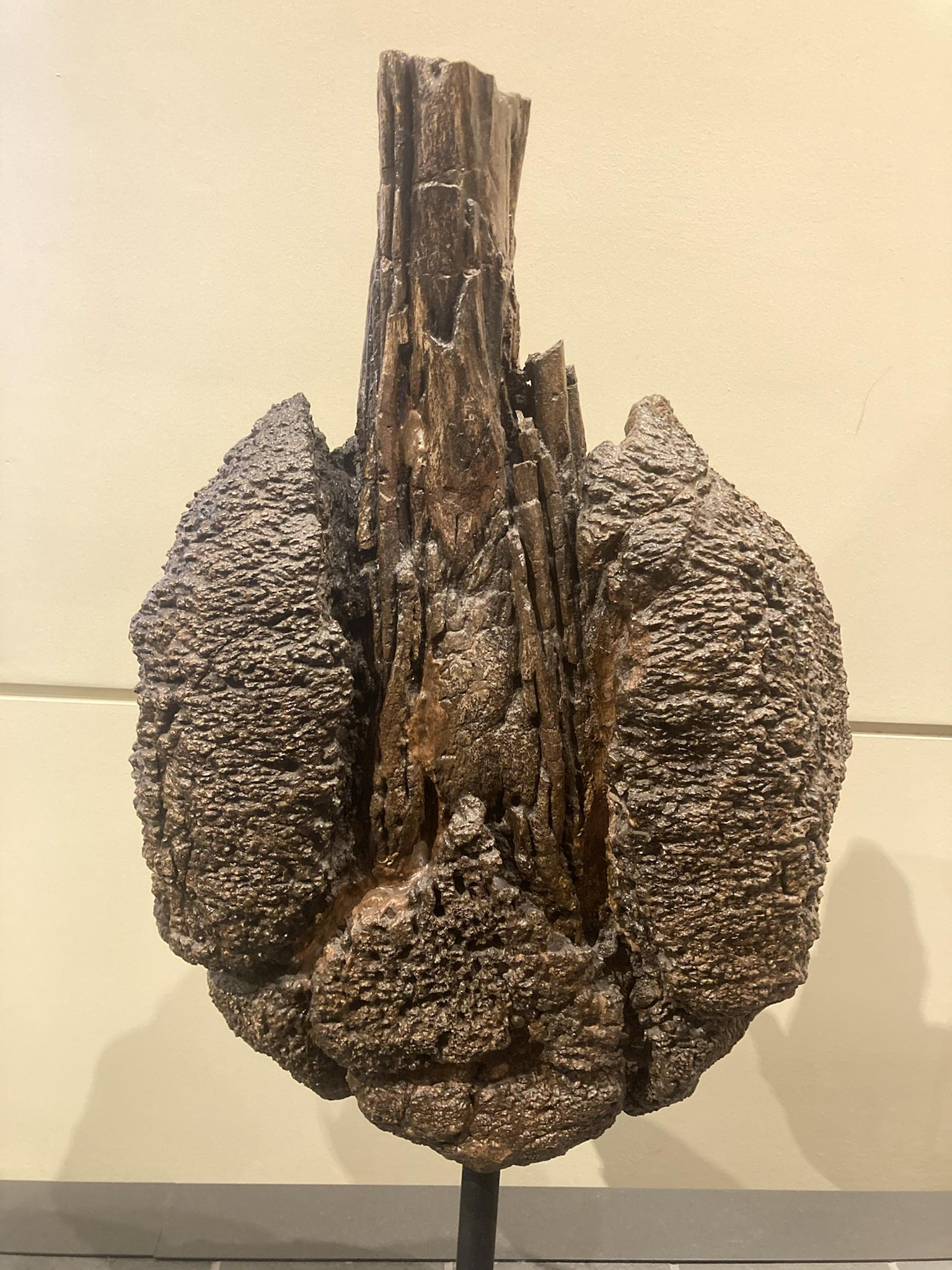
Club of indeterminate ankylosaurine, CMN 349

In 1978, W.P. Coombs, Jr. classified almost all valid species of Ankylosauria within either Nodosauridae or Ankylosauridae. This was a pivotal study and described many characters of ankylosaurs in the earliest phylogenetic analyses of the group.

Later in 1998, Paul Sereno formally defined Ankylosauridae as all ankylosaurs more closely related to Ankylosaurus than to Panoplosaurus. Ankylosaurs not known to possess a tail club were included in Kenneth Carpenter's 2001 phylogeny of Ankylosauridae. Daniel Madzia and colleagues in 2021 formally defined Ankylosauridae in the PhyloCode as "the largest clade containing Ankylosaurus magniventris, but not Nodosaurus textilis". The basal subfamily Shamosaurinae is formally defined as "the largest clade containing Gobisaurus domoculus and Shamosaurus scutatus, but not Ankylosaurus magniventris". This definition ensures that Shamosaurinae is only valid when both Gobisaurus and Shamosaurus form a clade to the exclusion of Ankylosaurus.

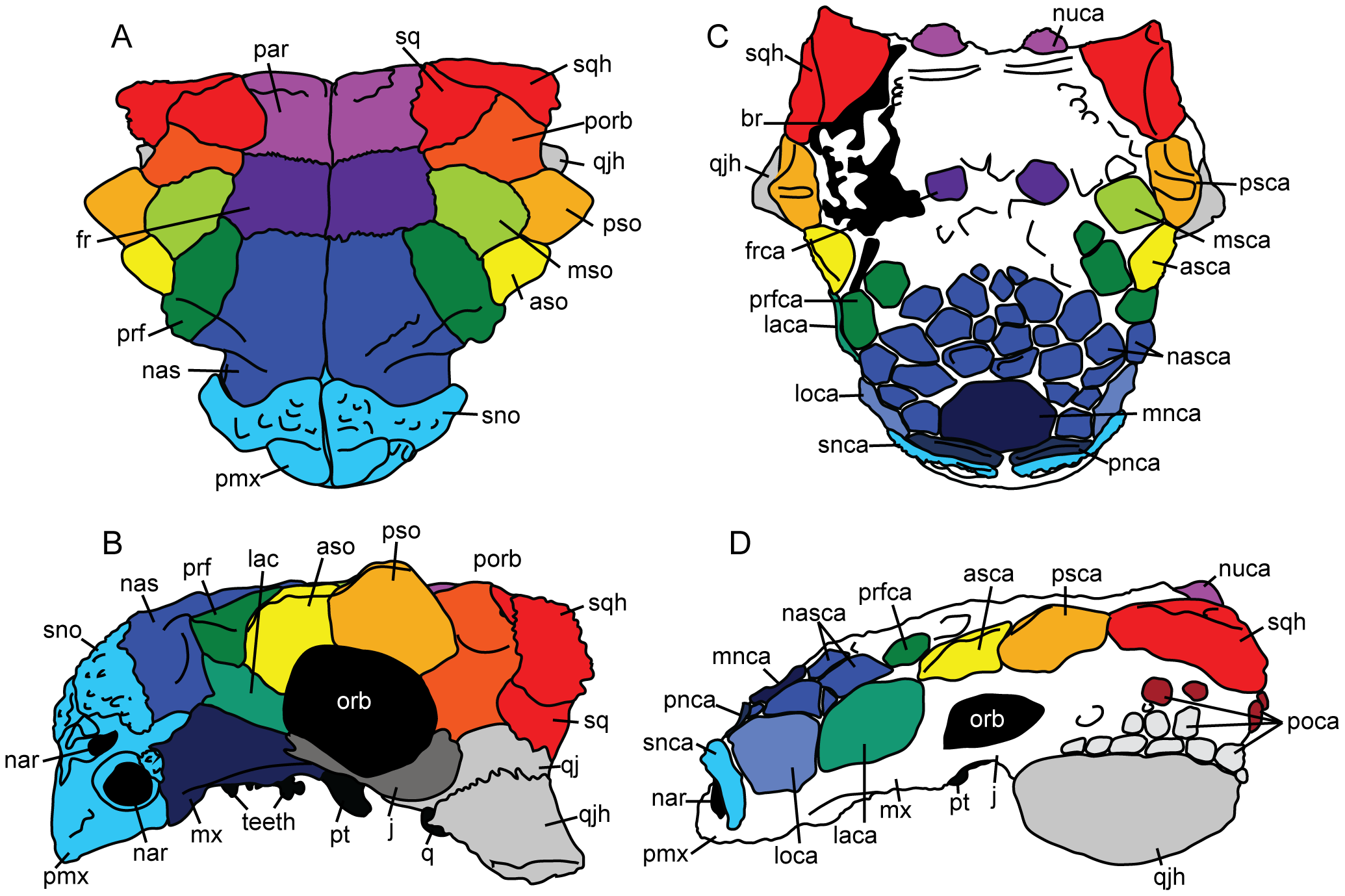
Diagram showing ankylosaurid skull anatomy

In a study done in 2004 by Vickaryous et al., Gargoyleosaurus, Gastonia, and Minmi were recorded as basal ankylosaurids, with the rest of the ankylosaurids filled out with Gobisaurus, Shamosaurus, and ankylosaurines from China, Mongolia, and North America.

In 2012, Thompson et al. undertook an analysis of almost all known valid ankylosaurs and outgroup taxa at the time. They based their resulting phylogeny on characters representing cranial, post-cranial, and osteodermal anatomy, and details of synapomorphies for each recovered clade. This study placed Gargoyleosaurus and Gastonia within basal Nodosauridae, and put Cedarpelta and Liaoningosaurus as basal ankylosaurids.

- - - Huayangosaurus taibaii
    - Stegosaurus armatus
  - - Nodosauridae
    - Ankylosauridae
      - Minmi paravertebra
      - - Liaoningosaurus paradoxus
        - - Cedarpelta bilbeyhallorum
          - - Gobisaurus domoculus
            - - Shamosaurus scutatus
              - - Zhongyuansaurus luoyangensis
                - Tsagantegia longicranialis
                - - - Shanxia tianzhensis
                    - - "Crichtonsaurus" benxiensis
                      - - Dyoplosaurus acutosquameus
                        - Pinacosaurus mephistocephalus
                  - - - Ankylosaurus magniventris
                      - Euoplocephalus tutus
                    - - - Minotaurasaurus ramachandrani
                        - Pinacosaurus grangeri
                      - - Nodocephalosaurus kirtlandensis
                        - - - Talarurus plicatospineus
                            - Tianzhenosaurus youngi
                          - - Saichania chulsanensis
                            - Tarchia gigantea

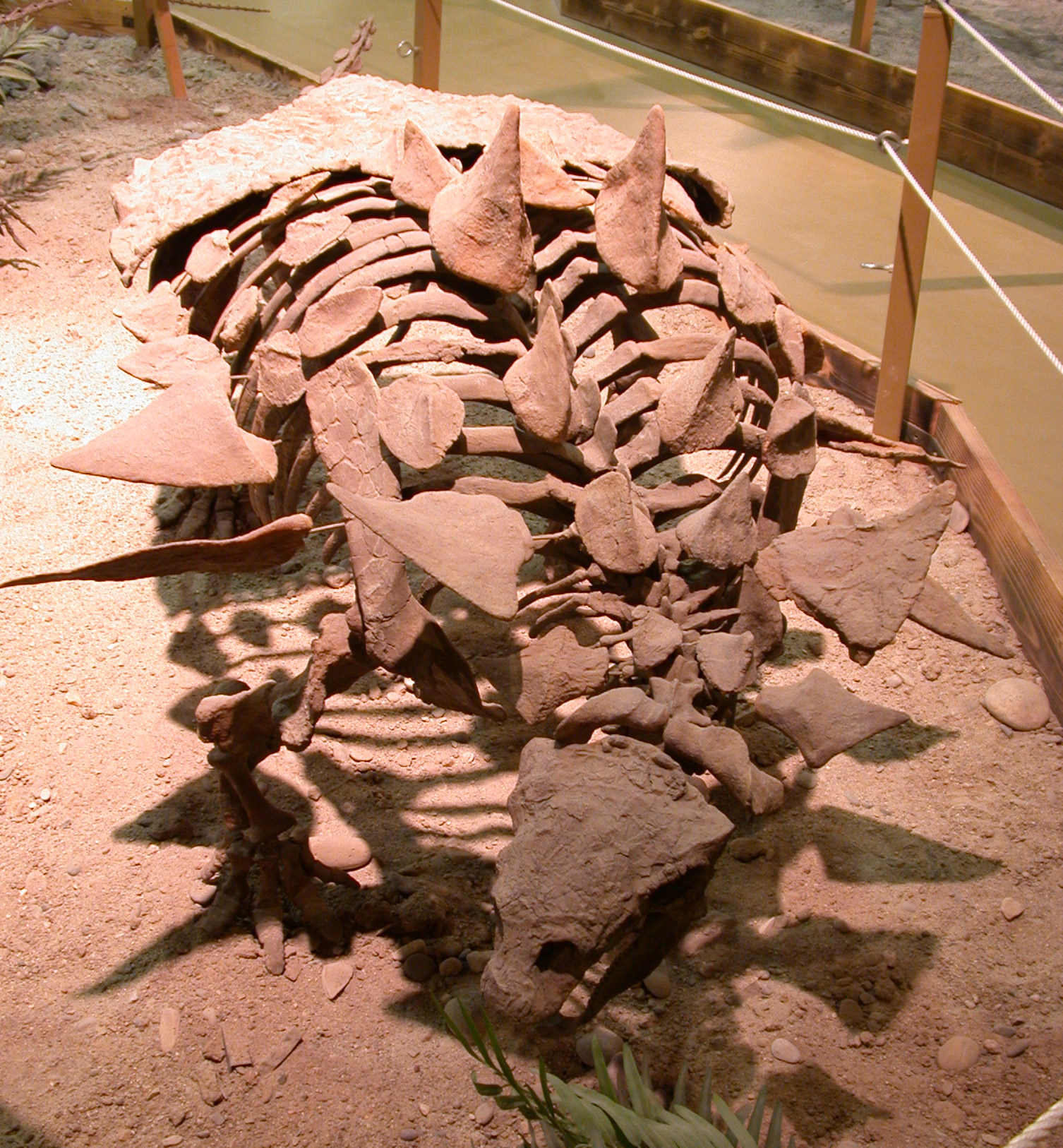
Gastonia and other polacanthine dinosaurs have uncertain placement, possibly within Ankylosauridae

In 2016, Arbour and Currie have presented a phylogenetic analysis of Ankylosauridae consisting of Gastonia, Cedarpelta, Chuanqilong, other basal ankylosaurids, and a number of derived ankylosaurids. Their phylogeny includes some uncertain phylogenetic relationships, between Ankylosaurus, Anodontosaurus, Scolosaurus, and Ziapelta.

- - Lesothosaurus
  - - Scelidosaurus
    - Thyreophora
      - Stegosauria
      - Ankylosauria
        - Minmi paravertebra
        - - Nodosauridae
            - Gargoyleosaurus
            - More derived nodosaurids
          - Ankylosauridae
            - - Gastonia
              - Ahshislepelta
            - - Aletopelta
              - Liaoningosaurus
              - - Cedarpelta
                - Chuanqilong
              - - - Gobisaurus
                  - Shamosaurus
                - - Crichtonpelta
                  - - Tsagantegia
                    - "Zhejiangosaurus"
                    - - Pinacosaurus grangeri
                      - Pinacosaurus mephistocephalus
                    - - - Saichania
                        - - Tarchia
                          - Zaraapelta
                      - - Dyoplosaurus
                        - - - Talarurus
                            - Nodocephalosaurus
                          - - - Ankylosaurus
                              - Anodontosaurus
                            - Euoplocephalus
                            - - Scolosaurus
                              - Ziapelta

== Paleobiology ==
=== Posture and locomotion ===
Ankylosaurids were likely very slow-moving animals. In all Ankylosauria, the fibula is more slender than the tibia, suggesting that the tibia carried most of the weight of the animal, while the fibula served as an area of muscular attachment. Hindlimb muscles of Euoplocephalus have been restored and the placement of several muscles inserting on the femur have very short moment arms. Muscles inserting on the tibia and fibula have longer moment arms. This pattern of retractor muscles points to an elephantine locomotion, consistent with columnar posture.

Restoration of Euoplocephalus forelimbs demonstrate similarities to crocodilian forelimb musculature. The most well developed muscles in the pectoral region had more of a weight-bearing function than a rotational one. It has also been postulated that the carpals and metacarpals bear resemblance to those of tetrapods with fossorial (burrowing) habits.

Several muscles in the posterior of ankylosaurids (dorsalis caudae, ilio-caudalis, coccygeo-femoralis brevis, coccygeo-femoralis longus, ilio-tibialis, and ischio caudalis) were used for motion of the tail and tail club. Ankylosaurids tend to have horizontal rather than an obliquely vertical orientation of zygapophyseal articulations in the free caudal vertebrae of the tail. This arrangement is most effective for side-to-side rather than vertical mobility. The absence of musculature to elevate the tail, and this orientation of zygapophyses suggest that the tail and its club swept parallel to and slightly above the ground.

=== Biogeography ===
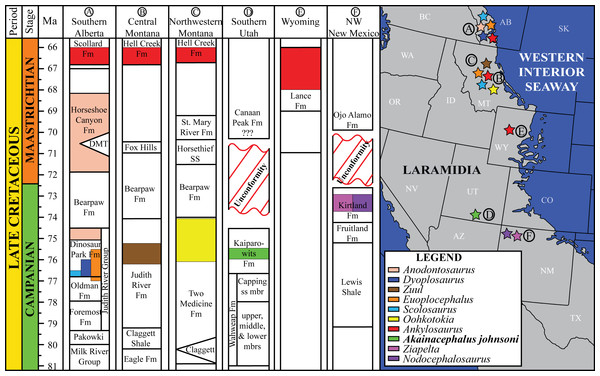
Map of ankylosaurine distribution across North America in the Late Cretaceous

It is difficult to establish the geographical origin of Ankylosauridae at present. There is a mix of basal ankylosaurids from both North America and Asia, which carries on through accepted cladistic analyses. It appears that in the mid-Cretaceous, Asian nodosaurids were replaced by ankylosaurine ankylosaurids. Some researchers postulate that Ankylosaurines migrated into North America from Asia between the Albian and Campanian, where they diversified into a clade of ankylosaurines characterized by arched snouts and flat cranial bone plates (caputegulae). There is no evidence for ankylosaurids in Gondwana.

=== Variation ===
Within Ankylosauridae there is much individual and interspecific variation in expression of armour. However, the most researched aspect of ankylosaurid armour is the tail club. There has been substantial ontogenetic and individual variability found in the morphology of this feature. There have been at least 16 caudal vertebrae included in the handle of the tail club of Pinacosaurus grangeri, and Euoplocephalus has an estimated 9 – 11 coossified caudals.

Variations in tail knob shape, thickness, and length are attributed to individual variation, taxonomy, or representation of different growth phases. There are difficulties with this last aspect, however, in that known clubs do not conform to a single growth series, yet some differences must be ontogenetic and allometric.

=== Lifestyle ===
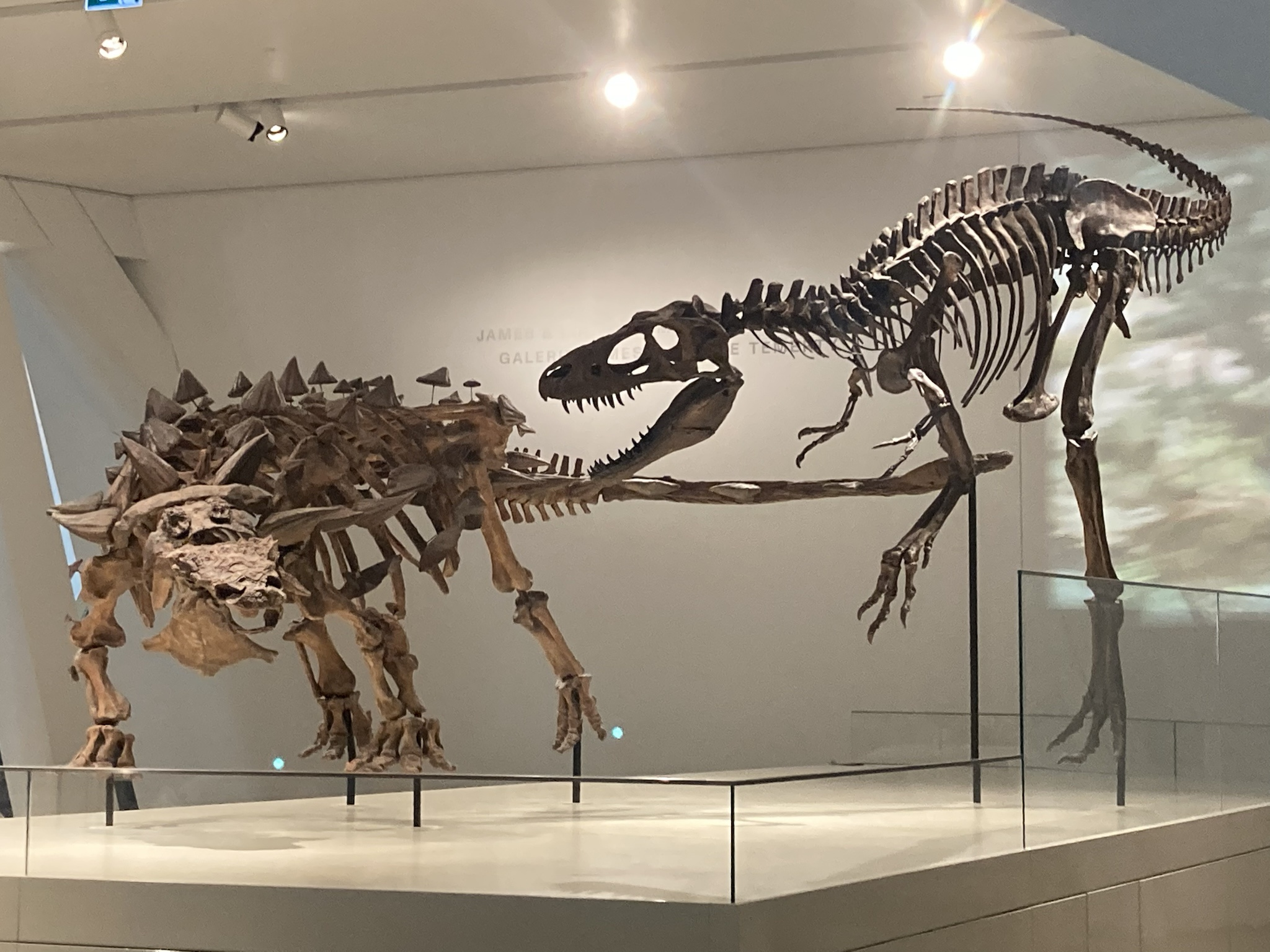
Mount of ankylosaurid Zuul using its tail club to fight off Gorgosaurus

Most ankylosaurid teeth were leaf-shaped, implying a mainly herbivorous diet. Their teeth could be smooth or fluted, or may differ on labial and lingual surfaces. Euoplocephalus tutus possess ridges and grooves on their teeth that have no relation to their marginal cusps. With their downward-facing neck and head, it is plausible for ankylosaurids to feed in a grazing pattern.

Non-herbivorous habits have been implicated for some species, however. Pinacosaurus has been speculated as being an ant-eater-like long tongued insectivore, while Liaoningosaurus has been proposed to be a piscivore. Either would be exceptional evidence of carnivory among ornithischians.

There are a few prevailing theories for ankylosaurid tail club function. The first is agonistic behaviour within a species. In most vertebrates, including dinosaurs, this behaviour is accompanied by structures for display or combat. Some researchers believe this phenomenon would have been implausible considering there is no modern tetrapod analogue that uses the tail for this purpose. These paleontologists instead propose that ankylosaurids made use of their broad, flat skull for head-butting between individuals.

The second theory for tail club function is for defense against predators. It has been postulated that the club would be most effective against the metatarsals of an attacking theropod.

The bones that form cranial ornamentation have physiological costs, and so would be inefficient to produce merely for protection against predation. The theory has therefore been posed that these wedge-shaped osteoderms could support a partly sexually selected interpretation.

== See also ==
- Timeline of ankylosaur research
