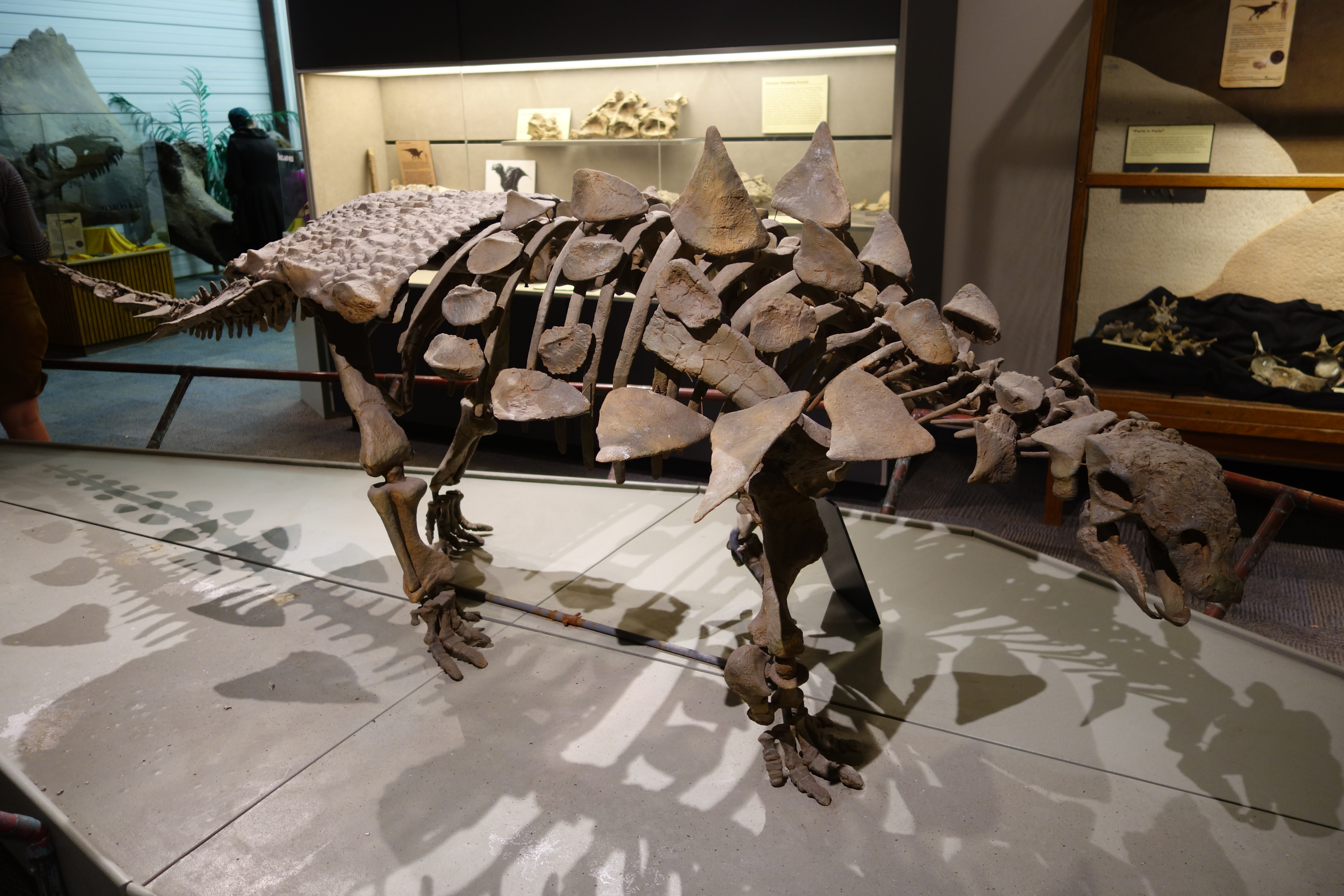
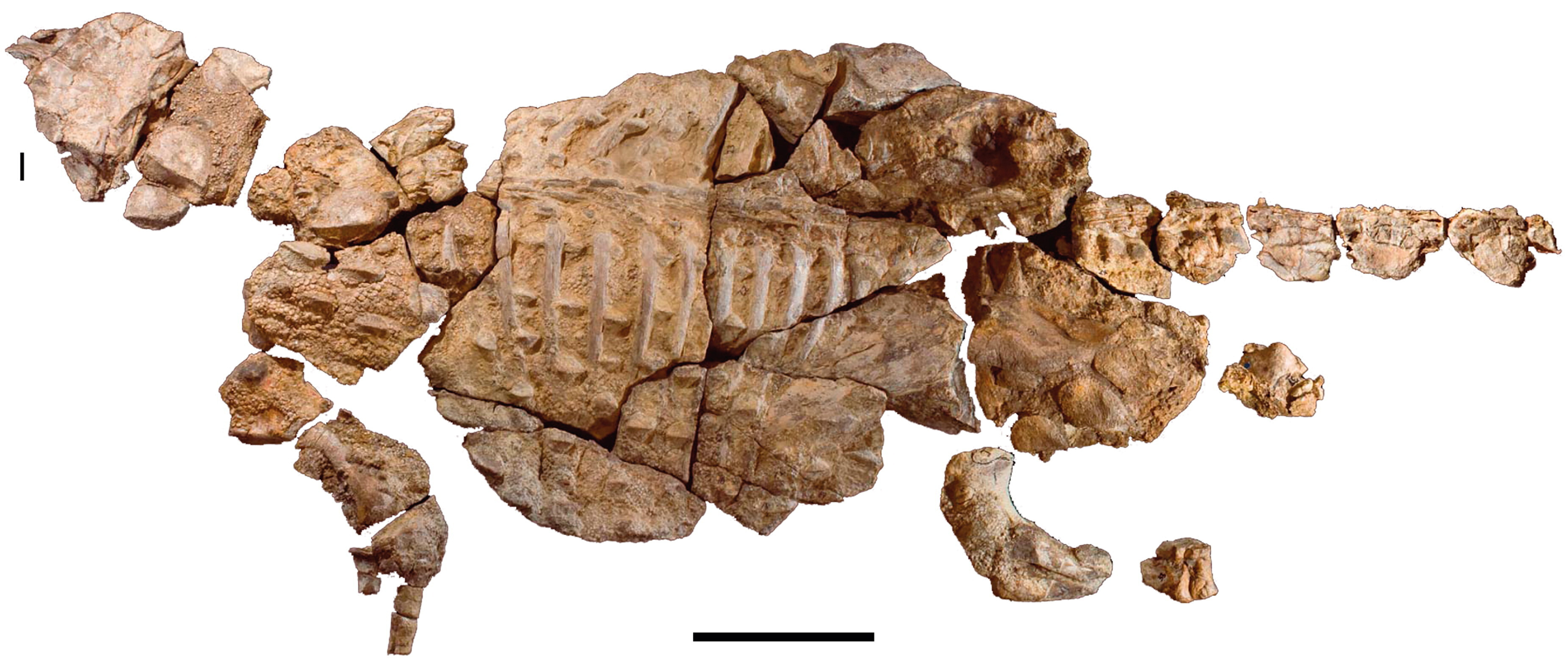
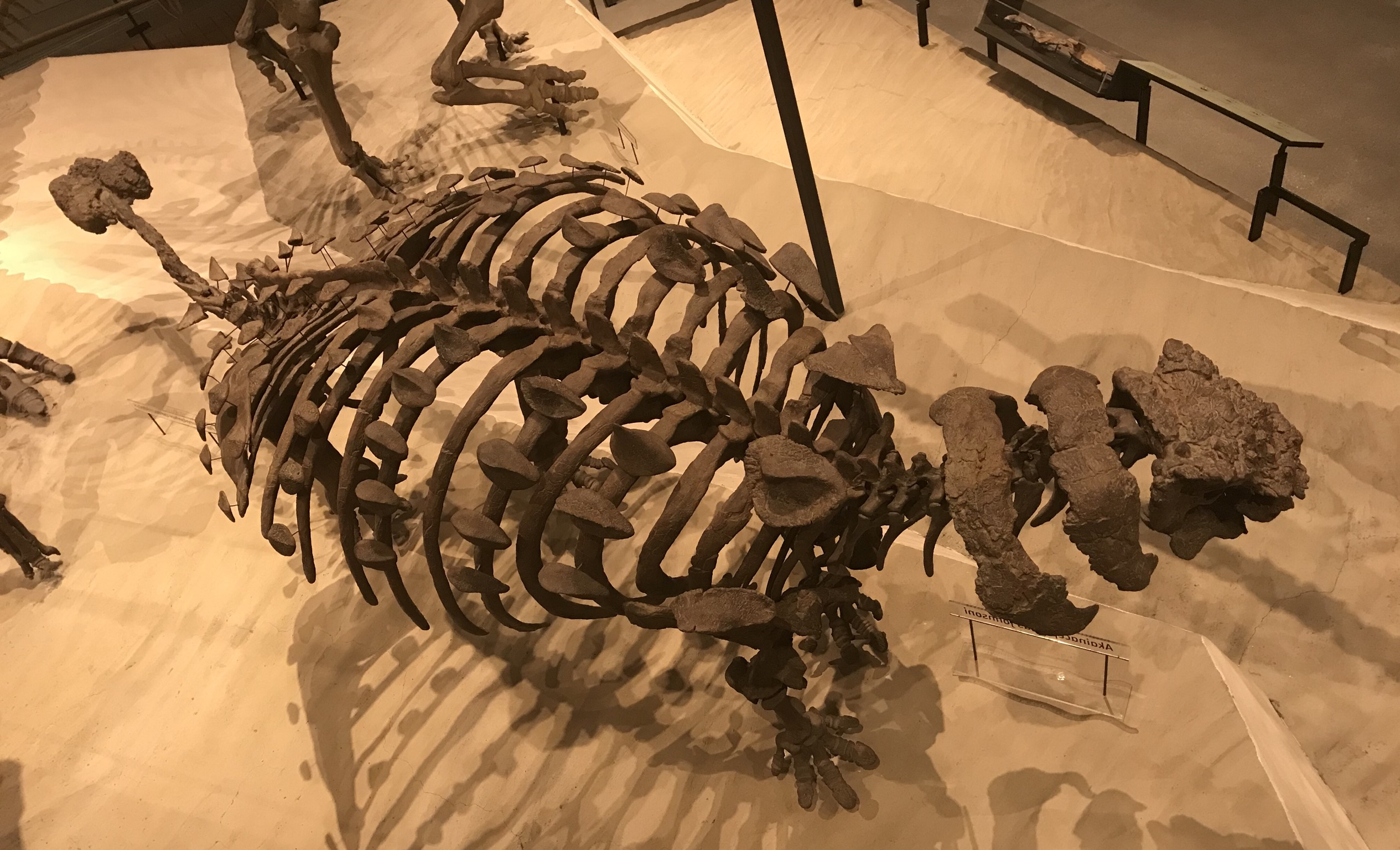
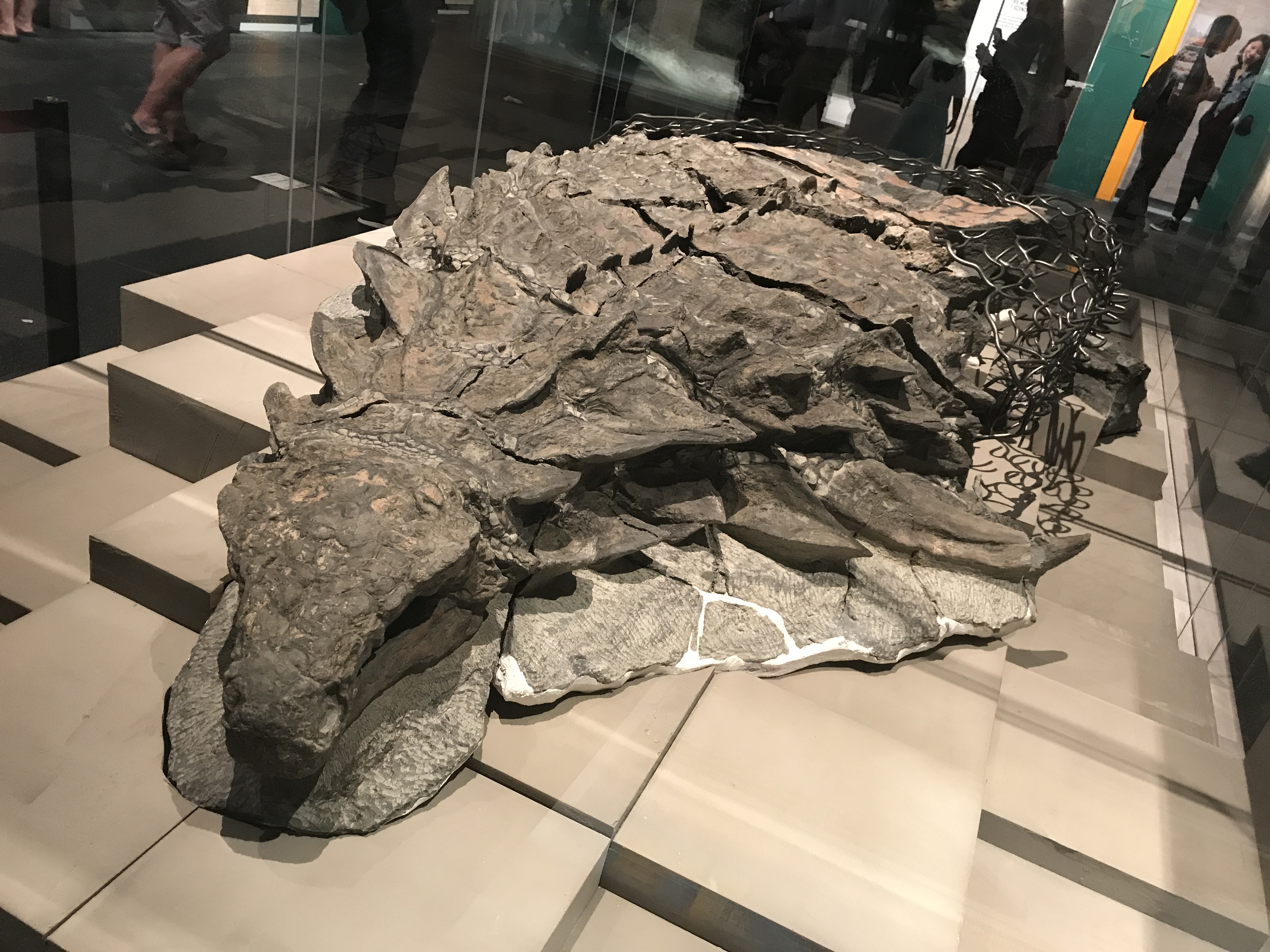
- Four ankylosaurs. Clockwise from top left: Gastonia (a polacanthine), Kunbarrasaurus (a parankylosaur), Borealopelta (a nodosaurid), and Akainacephalus (an ankylosaurid)

Scientific classification
- Kingdom: Animalia
- Phylum: Chordata
- Class: Reptilia
- Clade: Dinosauria
- Clade: †Ornithischia
- Clade: †Thyreophora
- Clade: †Eurypoda
- Clade: †Ankylosauria; Osborn, 1923

Subgroups
- †Parankylosauria?
- †Euankylosauria Soto-Acuña et al., 2021
  - †Ankylosauridae
  - †Nodosauridae
Genera of uncertain affinity
- †Cryptosaurus
- †Dracopelta
- †Jakapil?
- †Minmi
- †Mymoorapelta
- †Sarcolestes
- †Serendipaceratops?
- †Sinankylosaurus?
- †Spicomellus
- †Stegosaurides?
- †Tianchisaurus
- †Vectipelta
- †Zhejiangosaurus

Synonyms
- Ancylosauria Huene, 1914 (lapsus calami); Ankylosauroidea Norman, 1984; Ankylosauromorpha Carpenter, 2001; Apraedentalia Huene, 1948; Apraedentalidae Huene, 1956; Nodosauria Brown & Schlaikjer, 1943; Oligosacralosauroidea Zhao, 1983; Polysacralosauroidea Zhao, 1983

= Ankylosauria =

Ankylosaurs Temporal range: Middle Jurassic—Late Cretaceous, Bathonian–Maastrichtian

Extinct order of dinosaurs

Ankylosauria is a group of herbivorous dinosaurs that originate of the clade Ornithischia. It includes the great majority of dinosaurs with armor in the form of bony osteoderms, similar to turtles. Ankylosaurs were bulky quadrupeds, with short, powerful limbs. They are known to have first appeared in North Africa during the Middle Jurassic, and persisted until the end of the Late Cretaceous. The two main families of ankylosaurians, Nodosauridae and Ankylosauridae primarily originated from the Northern Hemisphere (North America, Europe and Asia). The more basal Parankylosauria originated from southern Gondwana (South America, Australia and Antarctica) during the Cretaceous period, though it has been suggested that this group is a separate lineage of thyreophorans outside both Ankylosauria and Stegosauria.

Ankylosauria was first named by Henry Fairfield Osborn in 1923. In the Linnaean classification system, the group is usually considered either a suborder or an infraorder. It is contained within the group Thyreophora, which also includes the stegosaurs, armored dinosaurs known for their combination of plates and spikes.

== Etymology ==
The name of this group of dinosaurs is associated with a number of anatomical features in which small and large bony shields fused together, completely covering their back and sides. On the skull these shields fused with the underlying bones, and the dorsal ribs fit snugly to the vertebrae. The Latin name Ankylosauria is derived from the Greek ἀγκύλος [ankylos] "curved" or "bent" with the anatomical meaning "hard" or "fused", and σαῦρος [sauros] "lizard".

In the 1908 description of the genus Ankylosaurus, Barnum Brown described the family Ankylosauridae as a group of representatives with a "rigid spine", but noted the wide, curved shape of the ribs, suggesting a "strongly curved" back (an error based on the alleged similarity to stegosaurs and glyptodonts, as ankylosaurs have flat backs). Therefore, "rigid lizard" and "curved lizard" could be additional meanings applied to the name of ankylosaurs.

== Classification ==
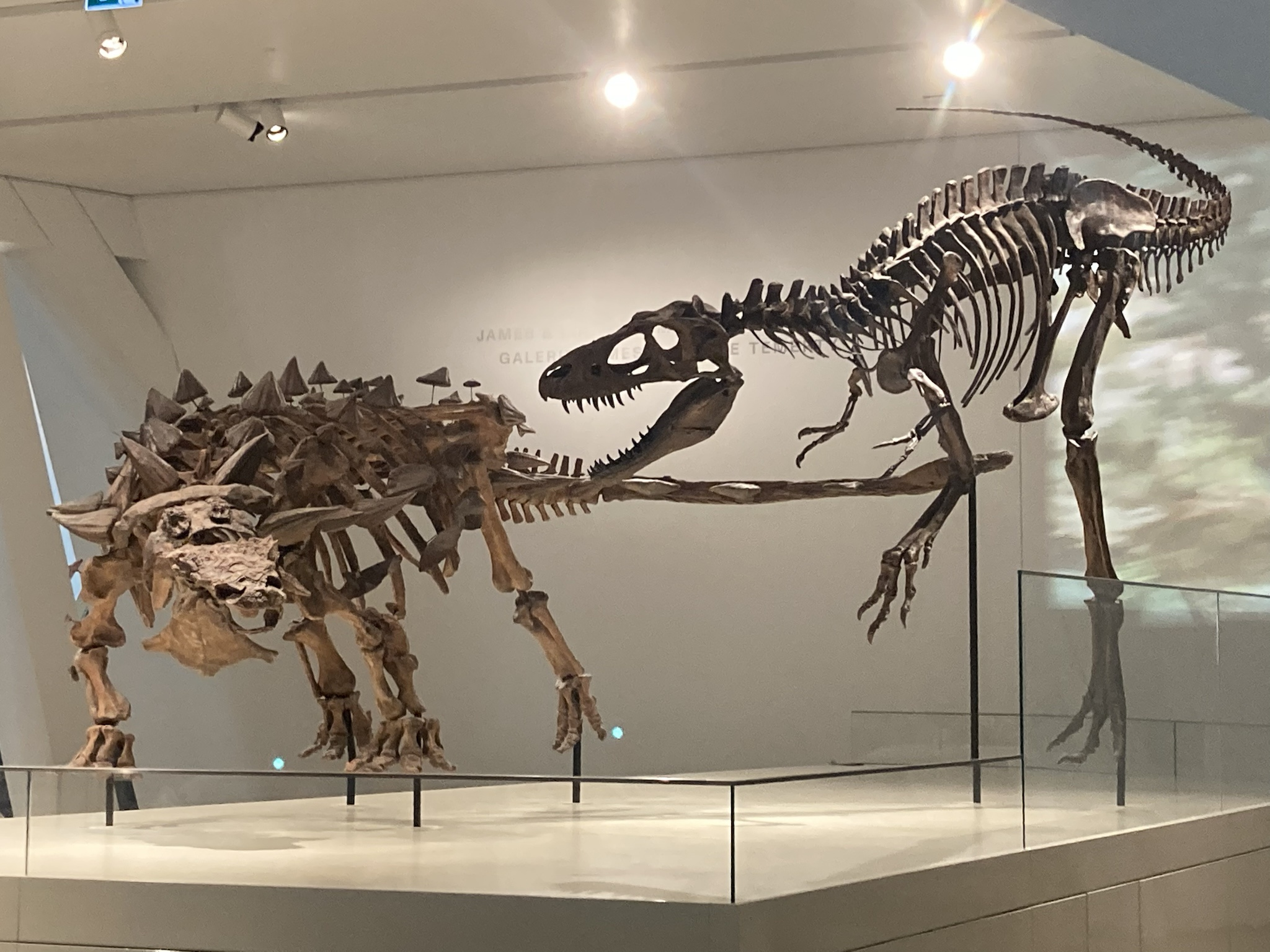
Mount of ankylosaurid Zuul using its tail club to fight off Gorgosaurus

Ankylosauria and Stegosauria together form the two major subgroups of Thyreophora, a group of armoured dinosaurs distinct from ornithopods and marginocephalians. Historically used for forms lacking large vertical plates, Kenneth Carpenter proposed in 1997 the first informal definition of the group, as all ornithischians closer to Ankylosaurus than Stegosaurus. This definition was further refined by Paul Sereno in 2005 to specify Ankylosaurus magniventris and Stegosaurus stenops, the type species of both genera, a definition that was followed by Madzia and colleagues in 2021 when the group name and definition was formalized following the PhyloCode.

Phylogenetic and morphological studies have differed on the inclusion of certain early taxa into Ankylosauria, especially the armoured Early Jurassic form Scelidosaurus. As some analyses, like that of Carpenter from 2001 or David B. Norman in 2021 find Scelidosaurus and possibly other early forms like Emausaurus and Scutellosaurus to fall closer to Ankylosaurus than Stegosaurus, Carpenter and later Norman suggested redefining Ankylosauria to limit it to the two subclades Nodosauridae and Ankylosauridae, creating the new clade Ankylosauromorpha for all taxa closer to Ankylosaurus than Stegosaurus. However, as historically even these primitive forms were considered ankylosaurs if they were more derived than Stegosaurus, Madzia and colleagues considered a redefinition of Ankylosauria to be undesirable, instead preferring to abandon Ankylosauromorpha as a same-definition junior synonym of Ankylosauria. The clade Euankylosauria was named by Soto-Acuña and colleagues in 2021 in their description of a unique basal ankylosaur Stegouros to represent the grouping uniting ankylosaurids and nodosaurids, to the exclusion of their newly discovered clade Parankylosauria. This clade is formally defined in the PhyloCode as "the largest clade containing Ankylosaurus magniventris and Nodosaurus textilis, but not Stegouros elengassen".

- Thyreophora
  - Scelidosaurus
  - - Stegosauria
    - Ankylosauria
      - Parankylosauria
        - Kunbarrasaurus
        - - Antarctopelta
          - Stegouros
      - Euankylosauria
        - Nodosauridae
          - Cedarpelta
          - Dongyangopelta
          - Gargoyleosaurus
          - Gastonia
          - Hylaeosaurus
          - Mymoorapelta
          - Panoplosaurus
          - Peloroplites
          - Polacanthus
          - Hoplitosaurus
          - Sauroplites
          - Taohelong
          - Nodosaurinae
        - Ankylosauridae
          - Aletopelta
          - - - Chuanqilong
              - Liaoningosaurus
            - - Gobisaurus
              - - Shamosaurus
                - Ankylosaurinae

A 2023 review of Thyreophora rejects the traditional Ankylosauridae-Nodosauridae split, instead finding "nodosaurids" to be referrable to three separate families: Panoplosauridae, Polacanthidae, and Struthiosauridae.

- Ankylosauria
  - Sarcolestes
  - - Paw Paw juvenile
    - - Animantarx
      - - Cedarpelta
        - - Gargoyleosaurus
          - - Polacanthidae
              - Hoplitosaurus
              - - - Niobrarasaurus
                  - Polacanthus
                - - Texasetes
                  - - Patagopelta
                    - - Hylaeosaurus
                      - - Gastonia burgei
                        - - Gastonia lorriemcwhinneyae
                          - Peloroplites
            - - - Sauropelta
                - Tatankacephalus
              - - - - - - Invictarx
                      - - Struthiosauridae
                          - - Silvisaurus
                            - Taohelong
                          - - Europelta
                            - - Struthiosaurus transylvanicus
                              - - Struthiosaurus languedocensis
                                - - Struthiosaurus austriacus
                                  - - Hungarosaurus
                                    - Pawpawsaurus
                        - Panoplosauridae
                          - Tianchisaurus
                          - - - Panoplosaurus
                              - - Denversaurus
                                - Edmontonia longiceps
                            - - Nodosaurus
                              - - Edmontonia rugosidens
                                - - Anoplosaurus
                                  - Dracopelta
                      - Ankylosauridae
                        - - Borealopelta
                          - - Mymoorapelta
                            - Stegopelta
                        - - - Vectipelta
                            - - Dongyangopelta
                              - Zhejiangosaurus
                          - - Ahshislepelta
                            - - - Aletopelta
                                - Talarurus
                              - - Shamosaurinae
                                  - Gobisaurus
                                  - - Kunbarrasaurus
                                    - - Liaoningosaurus
                                      - - Chuanqilong
                                        - - Shamosaurus
                                - Ankylosaurinae
                                  - Jinyunpelta
                                  - - - Tsagantegia
                                      - - Nodocephalosaurus
                                        - Zaraapelta
                                    - - Akainacephalus
                                      - - Pinacosaurus mephistocephalus
                                        - - Pinacosaurus grangeri
                                          - - - Crichtonpelta
                                              - Ziapelta
                                            - - - Ankylosaurus
                                                - - Anodontosaurus
                                                  - - Tarchia kielanae
                                                    - - Saichania
                                                      - - Minotaurasaurus
                                                        - Tarchia teresae
                                              - - Antarctopelta
                                                - - Zuul
                                                  - - Euoplocephalus
                                                    - - Dyoplosaurus
                                                      - Scolosaurus

=== Evolution ===
The origin of ankylosaurs is often misunderstood, and only a few specimens from the Middle Jurassic are known. The ancestry of ankylosaurs has long been sought among stegosaurs, the closest group to ankylosaurs compared to other dinosaurs. Currently, ankylosaurs are a close group of stegosaurs within the Eurypoda clade. They are united by the presence of osteoderms in the skin, the narrow triangular skull of stegosaurs is similar to that of nodosaurids, and some similarity is found in the structure of the palate. Ankylosaurs were definitely present in Africa by the Bathonian age as evidenced by Spicomellus in Morocco. Although a possible Early Jurassic (Sinemurian-Pliensbachian) origin has been suggested by Peter Galton in 2019 based on potential ankylosaur remains found in the Kota Formation, Spencer G. Lucas suggested in 2025 that this fossil record might instead be much younger than previously thought due to the age of the formation most likely extending to the Middle Jurassic. An incomplete radius and ulna from the Bajocian-aged strata in Isle of Skye, Scotland are known, the exact affiliation of which to ankylosaurs or stegosaurs is not established. Most likely, ankylosaurs followed a different evolutionary path from stegosaurs, although it is unknown when and how they split off. In the latter, the osteoderms become raised, and the lateral protection disappears. Ankylosaurs evolved towards the development of osteoderms on the surface of the skull, increased armor and further consolidation of the carapace, which suggests that the ancestor of the carapace consisted of separate non-fused osteoderms.

== Paleobiology ==
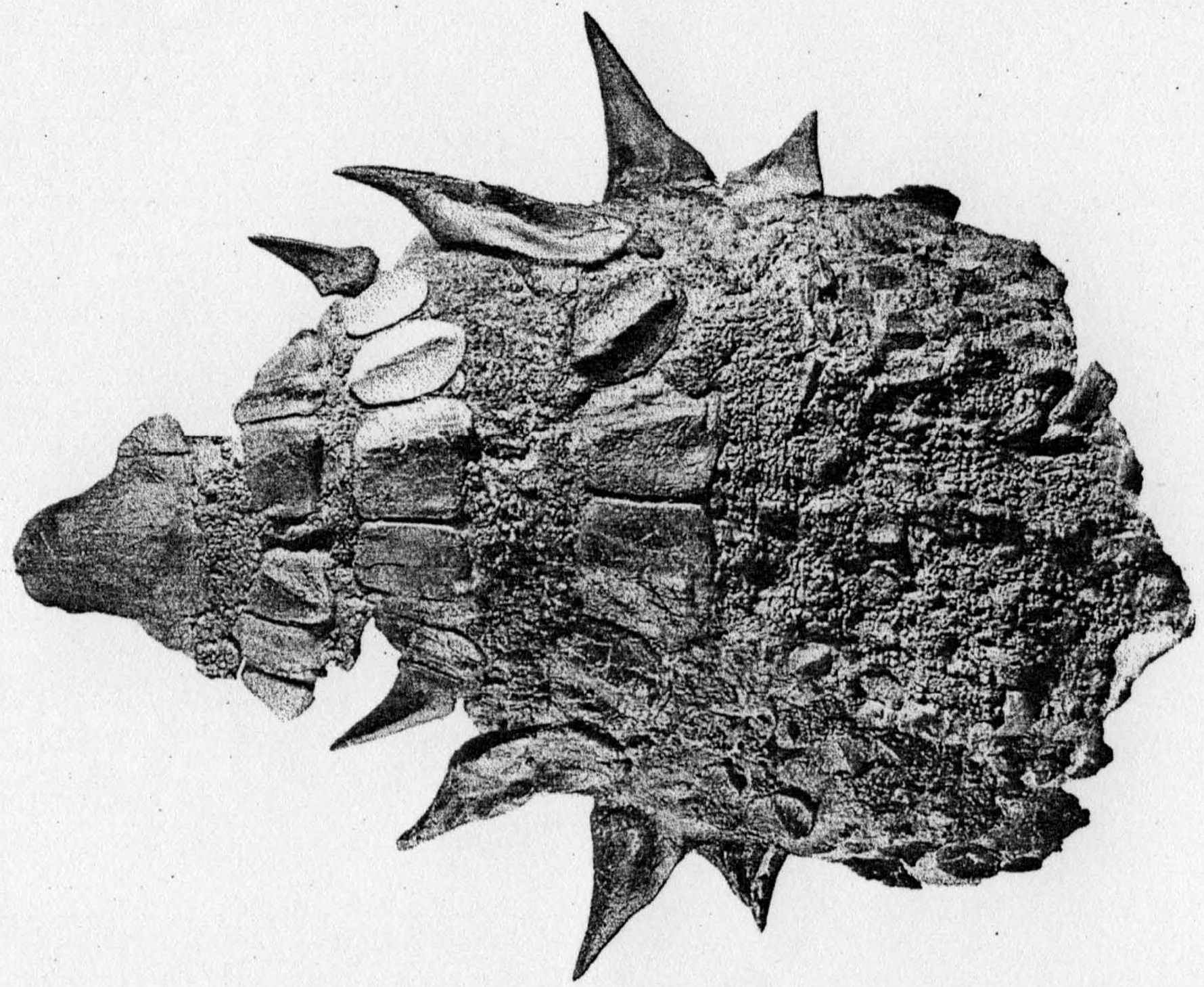
Armour of the nodosaurid Edmontonia

Possible neonate-sized ankylosaur fossils have been documented in the scientific literature.

=== Armor ===
All ankylosaurians had armor over much of their bodies from head to tail, mostly scutes and nodules, with large spines in some cases. The scutes, or plates, are rectangular to oval objects organized in transverse (side to side) rows, often with keels. Smaller nodules and plates filled in the open spaces between large plates. The two or three solid, bony ring/band around the neck have three or four scutes which can be adjacent to or fused to each other; in nodosaurids, this ring usually comes from several scutes adjoining against each other, while ankylosaurids usually have the scutes completely or partially fused to it.

=== Diet and feeding ===
Ankylosaurs were built low to the ground, typically one foot off the ground surface. They had small, triangular teeth that were loosely packed, similar to stegosaurs. The large hyoid bones left in skeletons indicates that they had long, flexible tongues. They also had a large, side secondary palate. This means that they could breathe while chewing, unlike crocodiles. Their expanded gut region suggests the use of fermentation to digest their food, using symbiotic bacteria and gut flora. Their diet likely consisted of ferns, cycads, and angiosperms. Mallon et al. (2013) examined herbivore coexistence on the island continent of Laramidia during the Late Cretaceous. It was concluded that ankylosaurs were generally restricted to feeding on vegetation at, or below, the height of 1 meter.

=== Vocalization ===
In February 2023, scientists reported that, based on analysis of a fossilized larynx from the ankylosaur Pinacosaurus grangeri, ankylosaur vocalizations may have been bird-like in the sense that sounds may have been produced low in the trachea (though not by a syrinx as in birds) and modified higher up.

== See also ==
- Timeline of ankylosaur research
