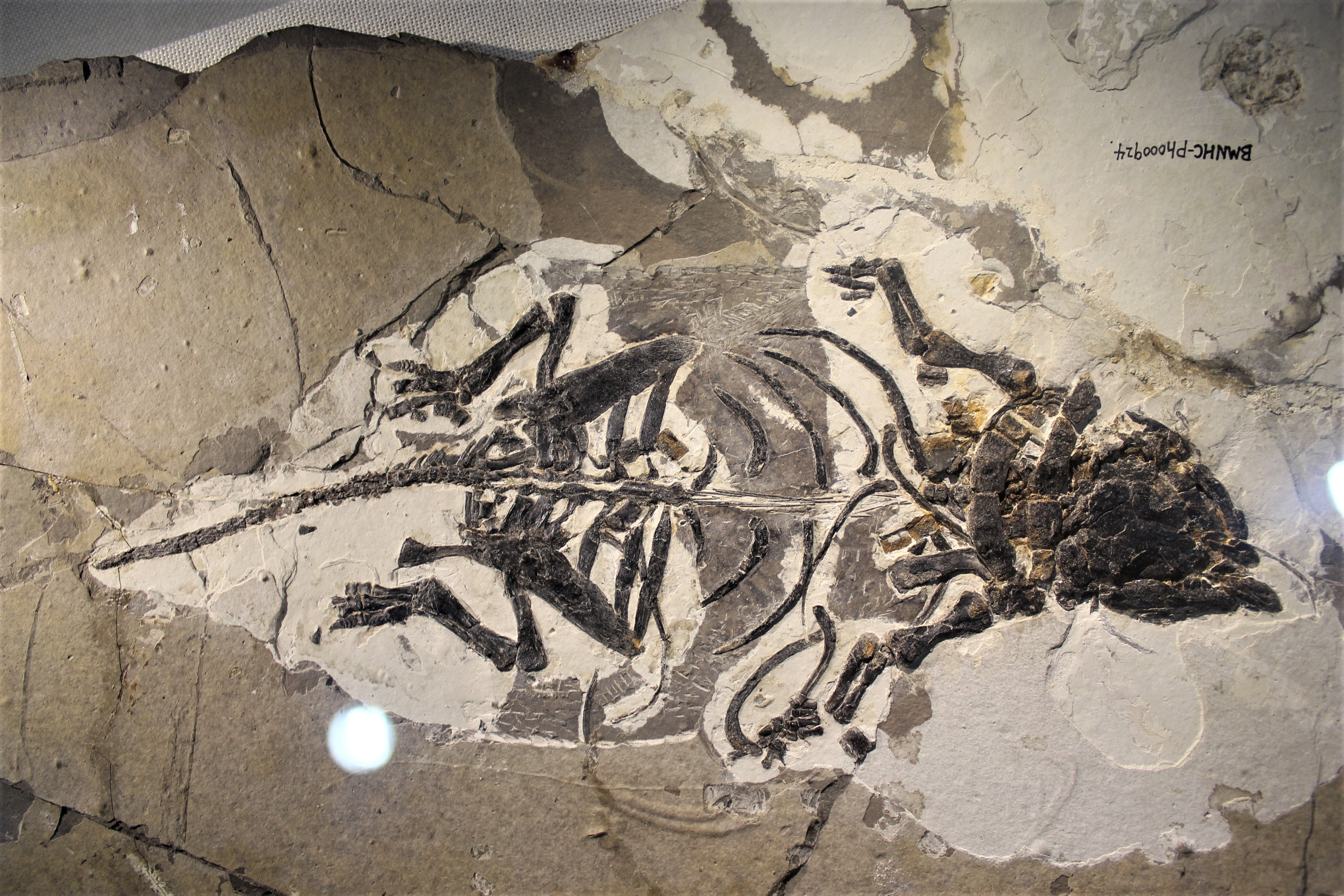
- An undescribed specimen of Liaoningosaurus (BMNH-PH000924) on display at Beijing Museum of Natural History.

Scientific classification
- Kingdom: Animalia
- Phylum: Chordata
- Class: Reptilia
- Clade: Dinosauria
- Clade: †Ornithischia
- Clade: †Thyreophora
- Clade: †Ankylosauria
- Clade: †Euankylosauria
- Family: †Ankylosauridae
- Genus: †Liaoningosaurus; Xu et al., 2001
- Species: †L. paradoxus

Binomial name
- †Liaoningosaurus paradoxus Xu et al., 2001

Synonyms
- Chuanqilong chaoyangensis? Han et al., 2014

= Liaoningosaurus =

Liaoningosaurus Temporal range: Early Cretaceous, 125.4–118.9 Ma

Extinct genus of dinosaurs

Liaoningosaurus (meaning "Liaoning lizard") is an unusual genus of basal ankylosaurid dinosaur from the Liaoning Province, China that lived during the Early Cretaceous (late Barremian to early Aptian stages, ~125.4 to 118.9 Ma) in what is now the Yixian and Jiufotang Formation. The type and only species, Liaoningosaurus paradoxus, is known from more than 20 specimens, represented by juvenile individuals. It was named in 2001 by Xu, Wang and You.

L. paradoxus was unusual among ornithischian dinosaurs in that it is speculated to have hunted or scavenged, with preserved gut contents showing that it may have eaten fish. Additionally, some features of its skeleton may suggest that it was partially aquatic. However, not all paleontologists agree with this interpretation. It is the oldest ankylosaurid to have had a tail club and had a wide paleogeographic and stratigraphic distribution in western Liaoning. Both Liaoningosaurus and Chuanqilong show various similarities with one another, with the latter being suggested to be a later growth stage.

== Discovery and naming ==
The remains of a juvenile ankylosaur were collected by members of the Western Liaoning expedition team of the Institute of Vertebrate Paleontology and Paleoanthropology (IVPP) from the Baicaigou locality in the Liaoning Province, China. It was recovered from the Dawangzhangzi Bed of the Yixian Formation, which dates to the late Barremian to early Aptian stages of the Early Cretaceous period. The specimen was named and described in 2001 by Xing Xu, Xiao-Lin Wang and Hai-Lu You. The generic name, Liaoningosaurus, is derived from the Liaoning Province and the Greek word "sauros" (lizard). The specific name is derived from the Latin word "paradoxus", in reference to a suite of highly unusual traits for an ankylosaur. The type specimen, IVPP V12560, consists of a nearly complete, articulated skeleton measuring approximately 34 centimetres (1 ft 1 in) in length that was preserved with the ventral surface exposed on a slab.

=== Additional specimens ===
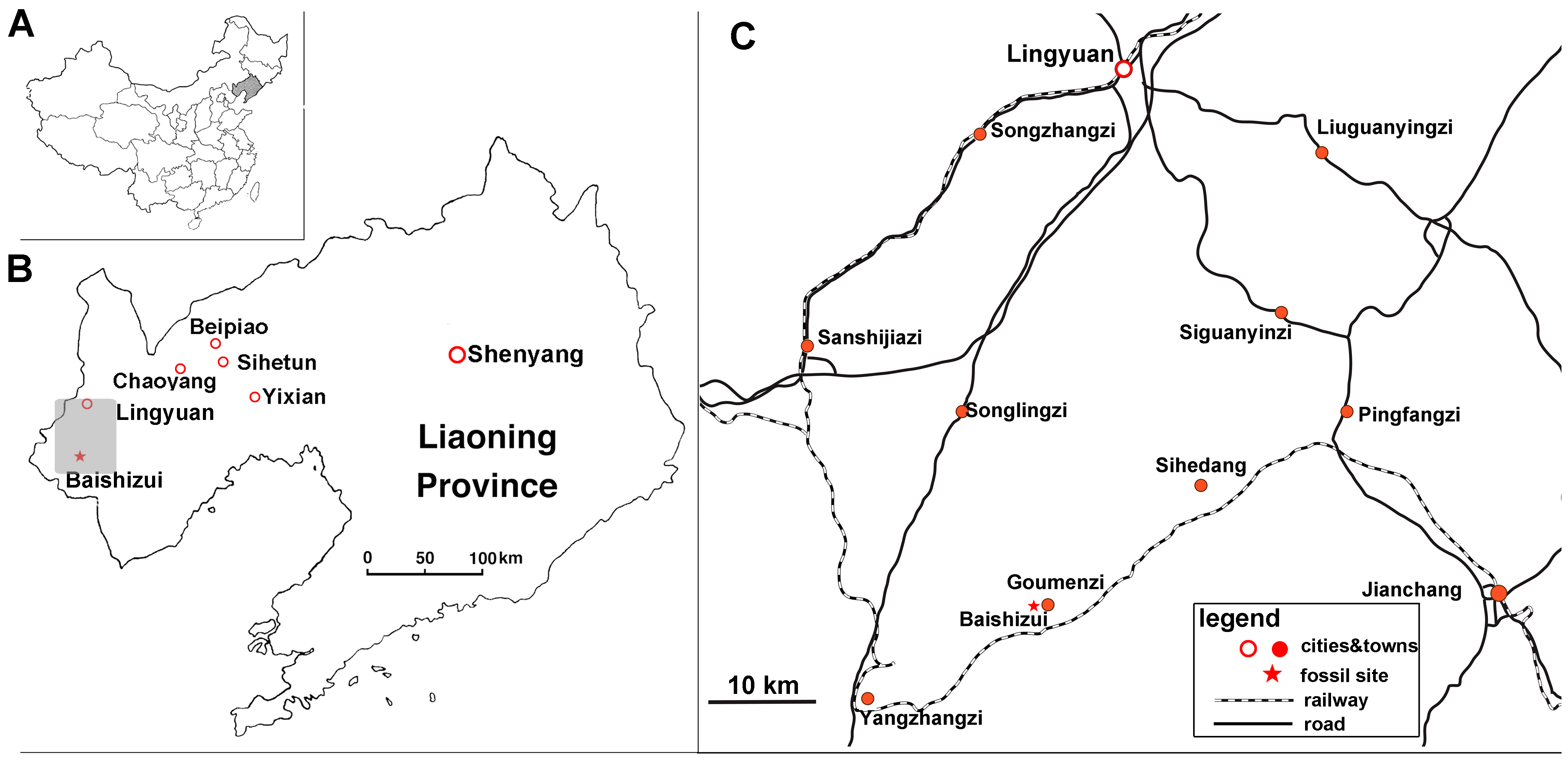
Map of the Jiufotang Formation.

In 2016, a nearly complete skeleton of Liaoningosaurus was described by Ji Qiang, Wu Xiaochun, Cheng Yennien, Ten Fangfang, Wang Xuri and Ji Yannan. The specimen, XHPM-1206, was collected from the Jianshangou Bed of the Yixian Formation, about 160 km west from the holotype locality. The authors noted that the specimen was slightly larger than the holotype and shows features that were either previously unknown or not accurately described in the holotype such as the humerus being almost as long as the femur or tibia and the presence of five digits rather than four on the manus (hand). It is currently housed at the Xinghai Museum of Paleontology. Arbour & Currie (2015) referred two specimens; CYGYB 208, a nearly complete skeleton that is preserved on a slab with the dorsal (upper side) surface exposed; and CYGYB 237, a nearly complete skeleton that is preserved on a slab with the ventral (underside) surface exposed.

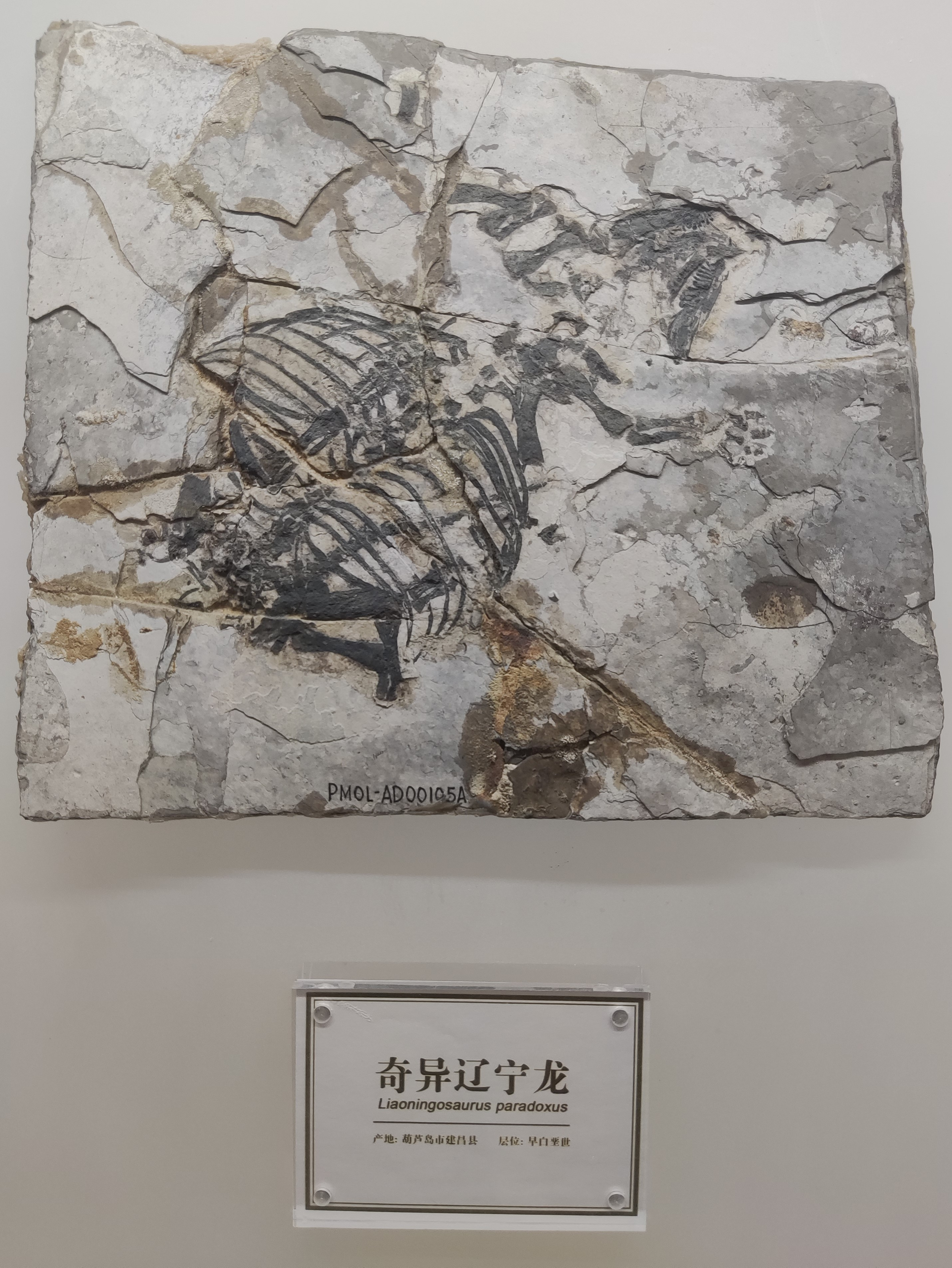
Fossil in Liaoning Palaeontological Museum

In 2022, Chang-Fu Zhou, Qing Liu, Xinyue Wang and Honggang Zhang described a nearly complete, associated skeleton (PMOL-AD00105) of Liaoningosaurus from the Jiufotang Formation of the Liaoning Province, China. The authors considered that the presence of Liaoningosaurus in the Jiufotang Formation supports the possibility of a wide paleogeographic and stratigraphic distribution in western Liaoning. A Canadian Society of Vertebrate Palaeontology abstract book that was published in 2019 mentioned that about 20 specimens had been collected from four different localities of the Yixian Formation, and one locality from the nearby Jiufotang Formation.

== Description ==
=== Size ===
The type specimen of Liaoningosaurus has an estimated length of about 34 centimetres (1 ft 1 in). It has a skull-sacral length of 17.2 centimetres (6.77 inches), while a second specimen, XHPM-1206, has a skull-sacral length of 19.3 centimetres (7.6 in). The largest specimen, GPMA-12-045, has a total body length of less than 45 centimetres (1 ft 5 in) and a skull-sacral length of 21 centimetres (8 in), and the smallest specimen, NGMC-98-003, has a preserved length of 22 centimetres (8.66 in) with a skull-sacral length of about 16 centimetres (6.299 in). A juvenile skeleton from the Jiufotang Formation has a total estimated body length of 30 centimetres (11.8 in).

=== Skull ===
The skull of Liaoningosaurus, like Chuanqilong, may have had an antorbital fossa or fenestra, as implied by a posteriorly excavated maxilla. An external mandibular fenestra is also present. The dentary bone has a straight ventral margin and has a stout appearance. On each premaxilla, slender teeth with few denticles are present. Premaxillary teeth are also seen in some basal nodosaurids and Gargoyleosaurus. There are only approximately 10 maxillary teeth, which has been suggested to be due to its juvenile status. However, the ontogenetic variation in the number of teeth is less than 10 among all known ankylosaurs. The tooth crowns are similar to those of Crichtonsaurus (or Crichtonpelta). The teeth have a shelf-like cingulum at their bases, and a palmate crown which bears vertical flutes that coincide with the notches between marginal cusps.

=== Skeleton ===
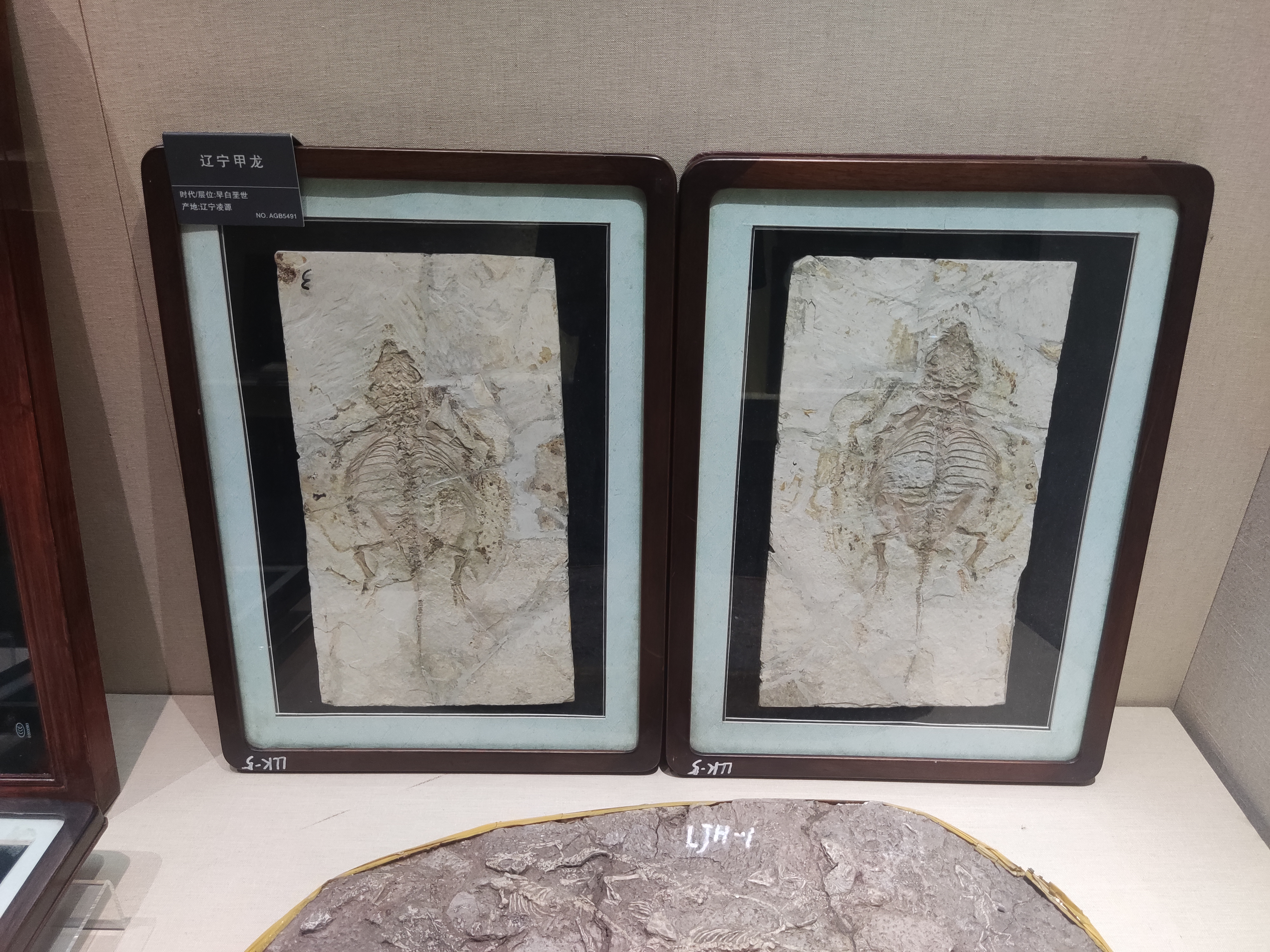
At the Anhui Geological Museum

Both the scapula and humerus are slender in appearance. The scapula has a narrow scapular base and a scapular spine that may have been directed towards the glenoid. The humerus has a deltopectoral crest that extends less than half the length of the shaft. The radial condyle of the humerus is poorly developed, while the olecranon process of the ulna is moderately developed. The manus is short. Xu et al. (2001) originally recorded the manual phalangeal formula as 2-3-3-2. However, Ji et al. (2016) noted the presence of five digits (fingers) rather than four in one specimen of Liaoningosaurus. The femur has an indistinct femoral head and a crest-shaped trochanter present on the mid-length of the shaft. The tibia is as long as the femur. The pes (foot) is about 230% as long as the manus. Metatarsals II–IV are elongate, while metatarsals I and V are splint-like. The pedal phalangeal formula is 0-3-4-5-0. Both the pedal and manual unguals are triangular in dorsal view, a condition also seen in Dyoplosaurus.

Xu et al. (2001) noted that the sternum has a sub-trapezoidal body, a very slender posterolateral process and a straight medial margin. However, Arbour & Currie (2015) questioned whether or not the sternum was preserved. The bone, tentatively identified as the left sternum, was found adjacent to various other elements and its boundaries remain unclear. The sternum could have possibly been displaced post-mortem, resulting in the anteriorly pointing posterolateral process. The sternum is dissimilar to those of other ankylosaurs, as it is not paddle-like with ovoid medial ends that narrow posterolaterally like that of nodosaurids, or fused at the midline to form a diamond shape, with narrower posterolaterally directed processes like that of ankylosaurids. The preacetabular process of the ilium deflects laterally and is enlarged. A crest is present on the acetabulum, which connects the ischial and pubic peduncles. The ischium is straight with a convex acetabular margin, while the pubis is strongly reduced in size.

Liaoningosaurus represents the oldest ankylosaurid known to have had a tail club. Although it possessed a tail club handle, it does not appear that a tail club knob was present. The tail club in ankylosaurids refers to the entire distal structure of the ankylosaurid tail, rather than just the large terminal osteoderms. The handle consists of interlocking neural arches on the distal caudal vertebrae, and prezygapophyses that overlap with the adjacent vertebra by at least 50% of the centrum length.

=== Skin impressions and osteoderms ===
With the exception of a few sub-triangular plates found near the cervical and pectoral region, it completely lacks osteoderms on its body. Xu et al. (2001) identified a large bony plate present ventral to the right pelvic girdle and noted that it was covered in small tubercles. These tubercles are hexagonal and rhombic in shape, and have a diameter of about 0.5 mm. This 'shell-like' ventral bony plate was noted as being present in no other ankylosaur. Arbour et al. (2014b) re-examined and reinterpreted the ventral plate as skin impressions, with the tubercles instead representing flat polygonal scales. This reinterpretation is based mostly on the broken edges not revealing any bony histology.

== Classification ==
Given the animal's unusual anatomy, Xu et al. (2001) had trouble identifying its relationship to other ankylosaurs. Their phylogenetic analysis loosely placed it into Nodosauridae. They conceded this binary division of Ankylosauria may not be entirely sound, meaning Liaoningosaurus could represent some third lineage. In 2004, paleontologist Matthew Vickaryous and colleagues left it under incertae sedis. A second cladistic analysis performed by Richard Thompson and colleagues in 2011 suggested that Liaoningosaurus is a basal ankylosaurid. This has become a consensus among phylogenetic analyses such as Arbour & Currie (2015) and Han et al. (2014), although a reduced strict consensus performed by Frauenfelder et al. (2022) recovered it within a polytomy, along with Cedarpelta and Chuanqilong, that is sister clade to both Ankylosauridae and Nodosauridae.

The following cladogram is based on a 2015 phylogenetic analysis conducted by Arbour and Currie:

- Ankylosauridae
  - - Gastonia
    - Ahshislepelta
  - - Aletopelta
    - Liaoningosaurus
    - - Cedarpelta
      - Chuanqilong
    - - - Gobisaurus
        - Shamosaurus
      - - Crichtonpelta
        - - Tsagantegia
          - "Zhejiangosaurus"
          - - Pinacosaurus grangeri
            - Pinacosaurus mephistocephalus
          - - - Saichania
              - - Tarchia
                - Zaraapelta
            - - Dyoplosaurus
              - - - Talarurus
                  - Nodocephalosaurus
                - - - Ankylosaurus
                    - Anodontosaurus
                  - Euoplocephalus
                  - - Scolosaurus
                    - Ziapelta

== Paleobiology ==
=== Semiaquatic habits and diet ===
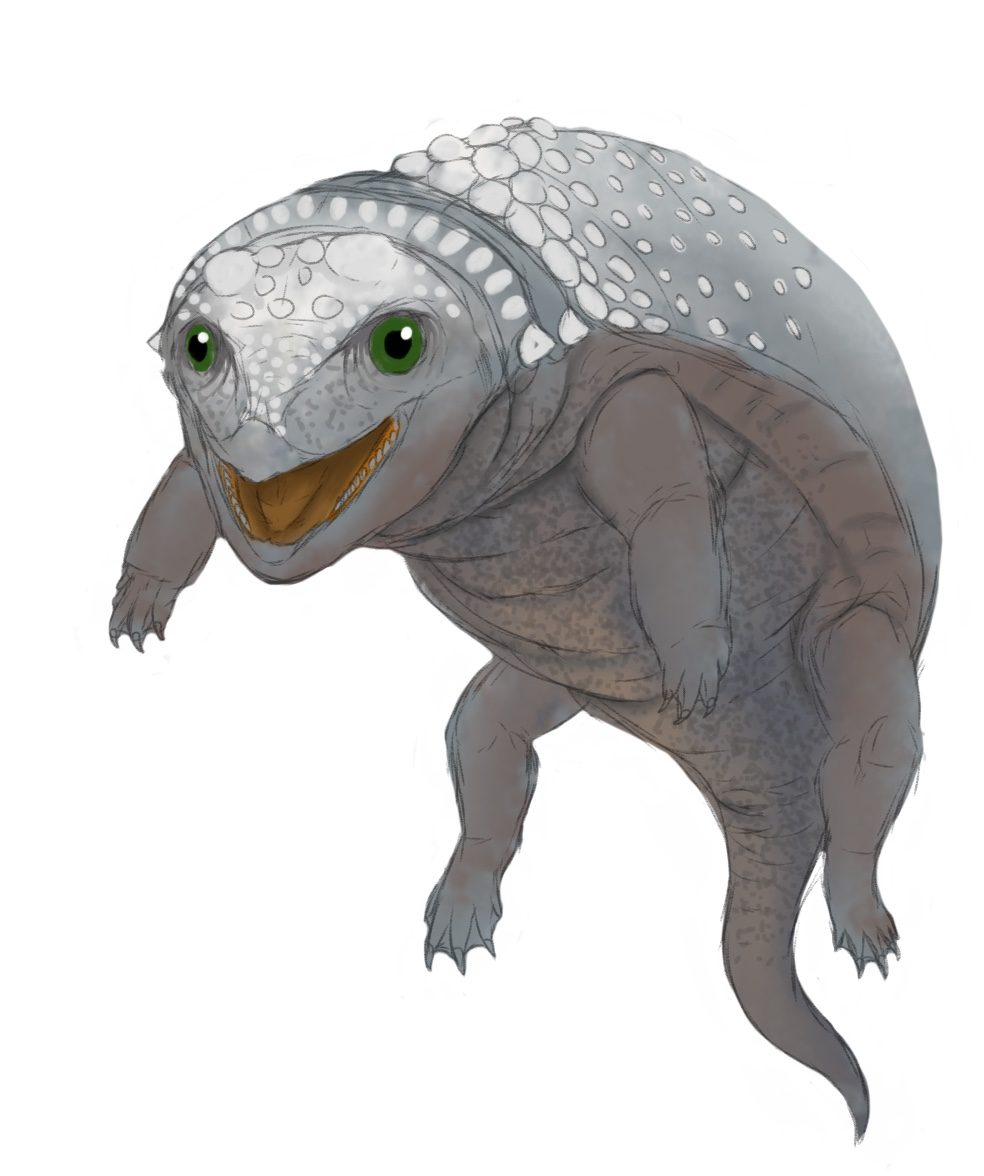
Reconstruction of Liaoningosaurus based on the semiaquatic hypothesis proposed by Ji et al. (2016). Note that its armor in this reconstruction is incorrectly drawn as carapace instead of osteoderms embedded in the skin.

Based on the second specimen that was described in 2016, Ji and colleagues proposed that Liaoningosaurus might have been adapted to a semiaquatic lifestyle. This is due to the presence of a 'shell-like' ventral bony plate that would have covered the entire ventral surface of the torso. The authors suggested that the structure would have functioned to protect the body from underwater attacks. However, a study by Arbour et al. (2014b) examined the shell-like structure and reinterpreted it as skin impressions with no bony internal texture. In contrast, Zheng (2018) suggested that the structure may have been formed by a ventral pelvic shield and an epidermal scale cover. Furthermore, Ji and colleagues argued that the lack of fusion between the spine and hip bones is an adaptation to a semiaquatic lifestyle rather than a juvenile feature and the presence of open neural arch-central sutures in vertebrae cannot be used to indicate the juvenile nature of the type specimen as it is a feature also documented in young adult eosauropterygians.

In addition to a semiaquatic lifestyle, the authors suggested that Liaoningosaurus was carnivorous based on the elongated and fork-like denticles of the crowns of the cheek teeth, sharp unguals on the hands and feet, and the presence of fish within the skeleton of the second specimen. They proposed three explanations as to how this association may have occurred, with the first explanation being that the fish, lying at the bottom of a lake or river, passively went into the ribcage due to underwater turbulence. The second explanation suggests that the fish died whilst within the ribcage when they were scavenging, while the third explanation is that the fish represent gut contents. The authors considered the third explanation to be the most reasonable, arguing that the obscure body outline and incompleteness of the fish was caused by digestive acids. The fish skeletons are scattered on both sides of the body cavity instead of being tightly packed in the stomach region, which may have been caused by the expulsion of gases or the compression of the stomach region post-mortem. In addition to fish, the tail of a lizard is preserved on the posterolateral side of the ribcage.

Paleontologist Andrea Cau has expressed skepticism on the idea, considering it too radical in view of the actual evidence, which could be explained by more parsimonious interpretations: reduced ossification of the skeleton and small size are typical traits of juveniles, and abundance of juvenile individuals compared to the adults is coherent with what is known of Mesozoic dinosaurs population dynamics and of high conservation deposits. Also, the aquatic depositional setting in which the specimen was found doesn't necessarily mean the animal itself was aquatic (many other dinosaurs have been found in such contexts) and the chaotic distribution of fish inside the thoracic cavity, and the presence of one outside of it, are more coherent with fish scavenging on the animal's carcass (it would also be expected that, given the abundance of specimens, more showed evidence of a supposedly piscivorous diet, but such is not the case).

=== Ontogeny ===
Arbour and Currie (2015) considered the type specimen to represent a juvenile individual on basis of unfused neural arches, small size and the absence of post-cervical osteoderms. In addition, Han et al. (2014) also considered the unfused scapula and coracoid, low and wedge-shaped olecranon process of the ulna, and unfused calcaneum and astragalus of the holotype to be juvenile characteristics. However, Ji et al. (2016) argued that the holotype, and other specimens, instead represented adults due to the lack of fusion of the ribs to the vertebrae, absence of a synsacrum, and small stature of all known specimens. A microanatomical study by Chinese palaeontologist Wenjie Zheng instead concluded that the holotype was no older than 12 months and further suggested that Liaoningosaurus could be the juvenile form of the much larger Chuanqilong. In 2019, Li Xiaobo and Robert R. Reisz investigated three more specimens and also concluded they represented juveniles. Zheng et al., (2025) concluded that all specimens of Liaoningosaurus found so far were under a year old at the time of their deaths through bone histology.

== Paleoenvironment ==
=== Yixian Formation ===
Specimens attributable to Liaoningosaurus have been recovered from the Dawangzhangzi and Jianshangou Beds of the Yixian Formation, which is a part of the Jehol Biota. The Yixian Formation is mainly composed of volcanic rocks such as andesites, andesitebreccia, agglomerates and basalts. It represents a freshwater lacustrine environment, lacking rivers and deltas among other variable features of freshwater settings. Such environments lacking these features include shallow lakes. The yearly temperature averaged about 10 °C (50 °F) and was temperate, with distinct wet and dry seasons. The fluctuations in the climate are due to orbital forcing. Conifers related to species that are found in modern subtropical and temperate upland forests dominated the landscape, with ferns, cycads, horsetails, and a small number of flowering plants also being present. Previous dating using ^{40}Ar-^{39}Ar isotopes gave an age of approximately 125 to 120 Ma, although more recent estimates indicate an age of 125.755 ± 0.061 to 124.122 ± 0.048 ma by using U-Pb zircon. The deconstruction and reconstruction of biotic components occurred frequently due to periodic mortality events such as volcanic eruptions, wildfires, and noxious gases erupting from the lakes.

Fossils of gastropods, bivalves, ostracods, insects, amphibians, pterosaurs, dinosaurs, birds and mammals have been recovered from the Yixian Formation. Ornithischians from the formation are represented by the iguanodonts Bolong and Jinzhousaurus; the ceratopsian Psittacosaurus; and the basal neornithischian Jeholosaurus. Saurischians include the sauropods Dongbeititan and Liaoningotitan; the dromaeosaurids Sinornithosaurus and Tianyuraptor; the troodontids Mei and Sinovenator; the therizinosaur Beipiaosaurus; the oviraptorosaurs Caudipteryx and Incisivosaurus; the ornithomimosaurs Hexing and Shenzhousaurus; the compsognathid Sinosauropteryx; and the tyrannosaurs Dilong and Yutyrannus.

=== Jiufotang Formation ===
One specimen of Liaoningosaurus was retrieved from the Jiufotang Formation of the Jehol Group. It overlies the Yixian Formation, and is composed of mudstones, siltstones, shales, sandstones and tuffs. Similar to the Yixian Formation, it represents a lacustrine environment lacking rivers and deltas. The Jiufotang Formation experienced less volcanism compared to its underlying formation, and fluctuated seasonally between semi-arid and mesic conditions. Based on analyses using secondary ion mass spectrometry (SIMS) zircon U-Pb, the formation dates to the late Barremian and Aptian stages of the Lower Cretaceous period, approximately 122.0–118.9 Ma. Zhou et al. (2022) suggested that the Jehol ecosystem (the Yixian and Jiufotang Formations) may have been more suitable for the survival of juvenile ankylosaurs based on the lack of adult specimens and abundance of juvenile specimens.

The Jiufotang Formation has yielded specimens of the basal ankylosaurid Chuanqilong, the ceratopsian Psittacosaurus, the dromaeosaurid Microraptor, the oviraptorosaur Similicaudipteryx, the jeholornithiforms Jeholornis and Kompsornis, and the tyrannosaur Sinotyrannus. Other vertebrate fossils found in the formation included fish, mammaliamorphs such as Fossiomanus and Liaoconodon, the choristoderans Philydrosaurus and Ikechosaurus, pterosaurs like Liaoningopterus, Sinopterus, and Guidraco, enantiornithines such as Longipteryx, Sinornis and Yuanchuavis, and a variety of early birds like Yanornis and Yixianornis.

== See also ==
- Halszkaraptor
- Koreaceratops
- Lurdusaurus
- Spinosaurus
- Timeline of ankylosaur research
