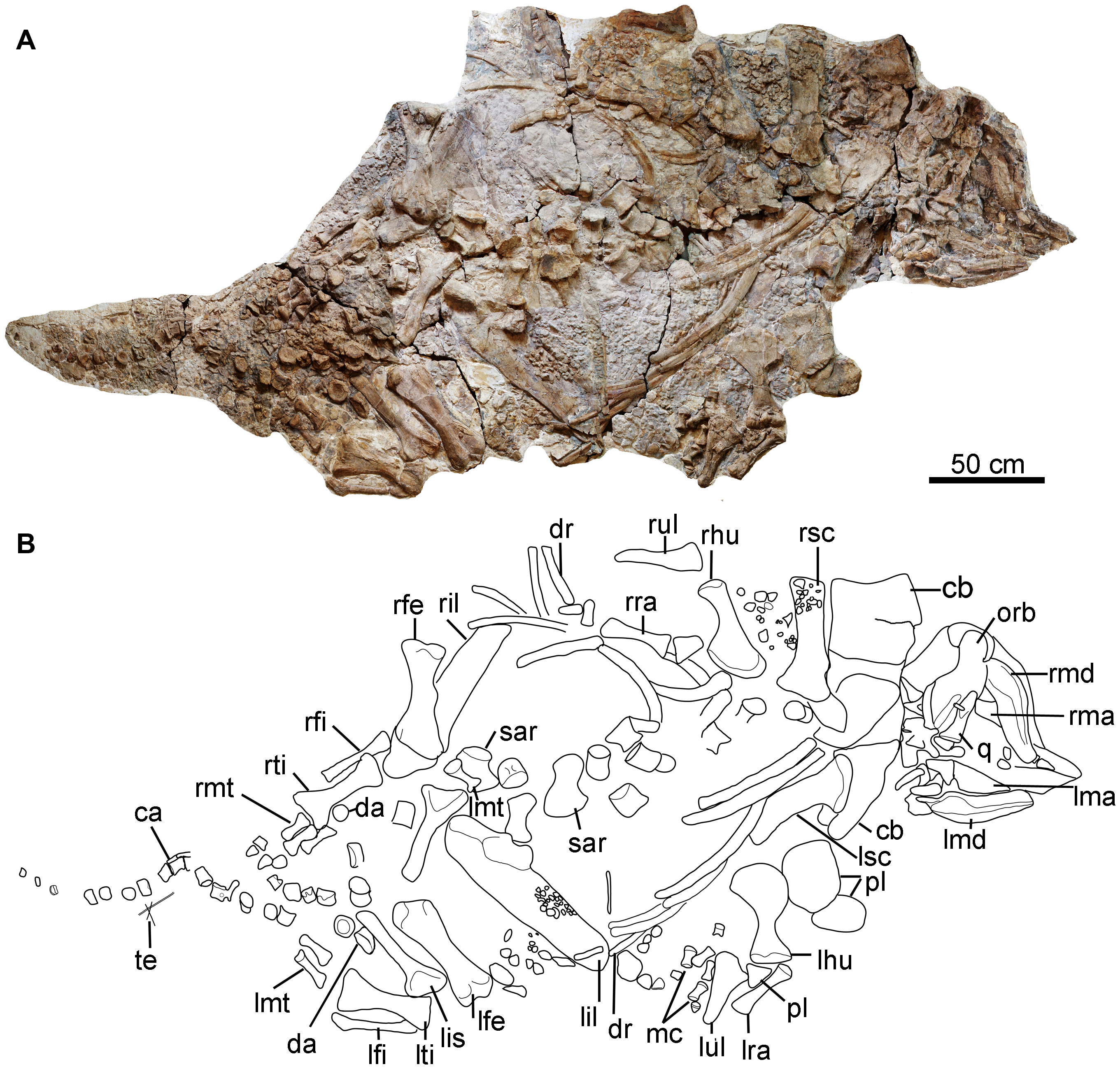
- Holotype specimen

Scientific classification
- Kingdom: Animalia
- Phylum: Chordata
- Clade: Dinosauria
- Clade: †Ornithischia
- Clade: †Thyreophora
- Clade: †Ankylosauria
- Family: †Ankylosauridae
- Genus: †Chuanqilong; Han et al., 2014

Type species
- †Chuanqilong chaoyangensis Han et al., 2014

= Chuanqilong =

Chuanqilong Temporal range: Early Cretaceous 124.0–121 Ma

Extinct genus of dinosaurs

Chuanqilong (meaning "legendary dragon") is a monospecific genus of basal ankylosaurid dinosaur from the Liaoning Province, China that lived during the Early Cretaceous ( Barremian to Aptian stage, 124.0 to 121 Ma) in what is now the Jiufotang Formation. The type and only species, Chuanqilong chaoyangensis, is known from a nearly complete skeleton with a skull of a juvenile individual. It was described in 2014 by Fenglu Han, Wenjie Zheng, Dongyu Hu, Xing Xu, and Paul M. Barrett. Chuanqilong shows many similarities with Liaoningosaurus and may represent a later ontogenetic stage of the taxon.

Chuanqilong was a medium-sized ankylosaur, with an estimated length of 4.5 metres (14.8 feet), although it has been suggested that it would have been larger due to the immature age of the type specimen. It had a triangular skull and a neck that was protected by bands of osteoderms known as cervical half rings. The rest of the body was covered in osteoderms and ossicles of various shapes and sizes. Unlike derived ankylosaurids, the end of its tail lacked a club. Like other ankylosaurids, it was quadrupedal with robust forelimbs and hindlimbs.

== Discovery and naming ==
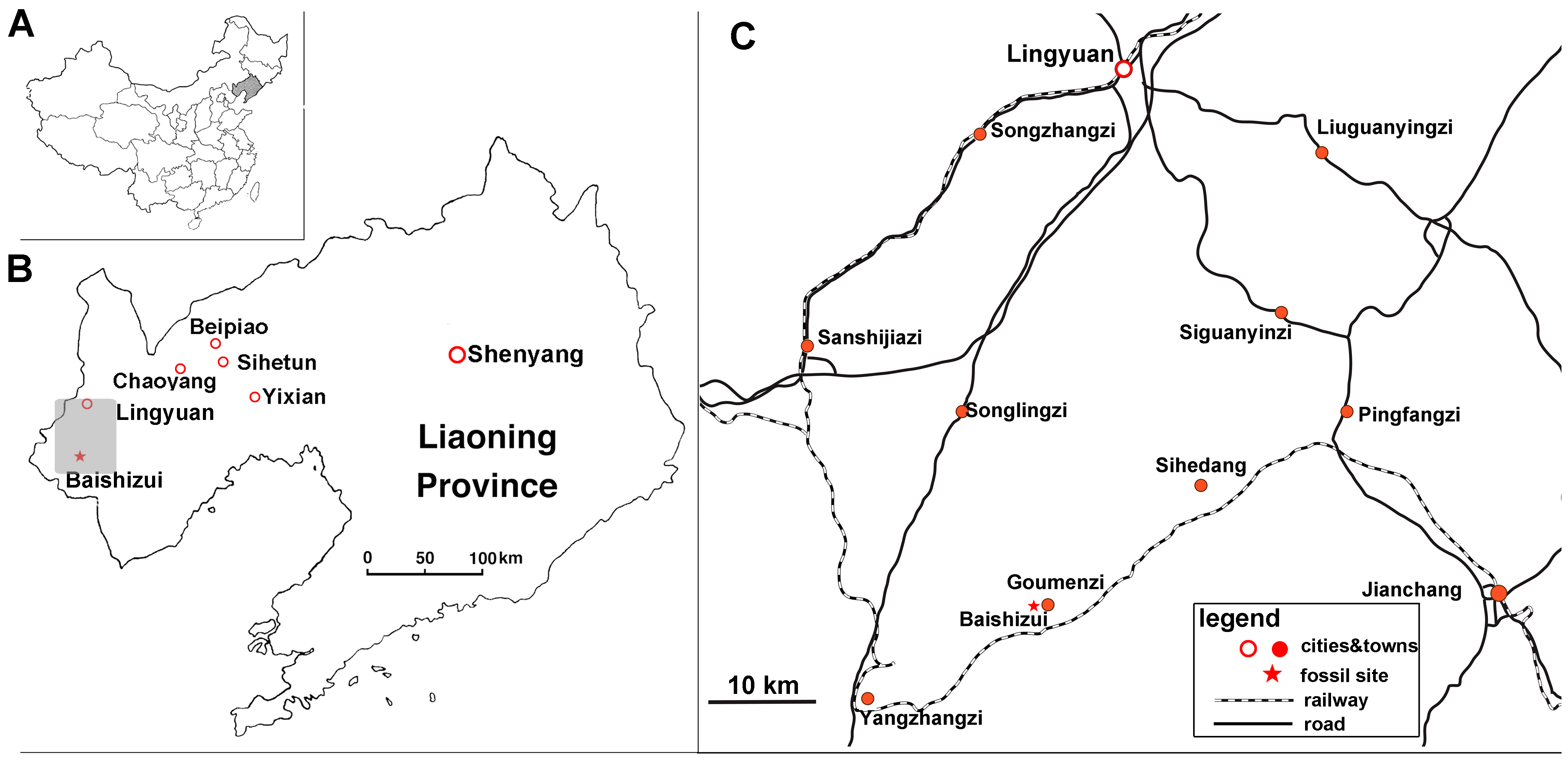
Map of the type locality.

A nearly complete skeleton was collected by local farmers from a single quarry in the Liaoning Province, China. The skeleton was recovered from the Jiufotang Formation which dates to the late Barremian to Aptian stages of the Early Cretaceous period, 122.0 to 118.9 Ma. The specimen was named and described in 2014 by Fenglu Han, Wenjie Zheng, Dongyu Hu, Xing Xu, and Paul M. Barrett. The holotype specimen, CJPM V001, consists of a nearly complete skull and skeleton, with only the distal portion of the caudal series missing, and represents a juvenile individual. The authors noted that the specimen was at a more advanced ontogenetic stage than the specimens of the sympatric Liaoningosaurus based on the larger size of the type specimen, the size of the orbit and the tooth count. The specimen is preserved two-dimensionally, with only the ventral side being visible. Most of the skull is compressed dorsoventrally and most of the vertebral column is disarticulated, while the limbs are preserved in articulation. The type specimen is currently housed at the Chaoyang Jizantang Paleontological Museum, while a cast of the specimen (IVPP FV 1978) is housed at the Institute of Vertebrate Paleontology and Paleoanthropology.

The generic name, Chuanqilong, is derived from the Chinese words "Chuanqi" (legendary), in reference to the abundance of fossils of western Liaoning, and "long" (dragon). The specific name, chaoyangensis, refers to the broader geographical area which encompasses the type locality.

In 2014, the impressions of a scapulocoracoid and humerus belonging to an indeterminate ankylosaur with an estimated body length of 6.0-8.6 metres (19.7-18.2 feet) were described from the Jiufotang Formation and, at the time, was the first ankylosaur described from the formation. A Canadian Society of Vertebrate Palaeontology abstract book that was published in 2019 mentioned that the type and only known specimen of Chuanqilong actually represented an adult individual, in contrast to the interpretation of Han et al. (2014), and may have been Liaoningosaurus at a different and later ontogenetic stage.

== Description ==
=== Size and distinguishing traits ===
Han et al. (2014) gave Chuanqilong an estimated length of 4.5 metres (14.8 feet). However, the authors suggested that it could have reached larger sizes as the type specimen represents a juvenile individual.

The describing authors indicated two distinguishing traits. Both of these are autapomorphies, unique derived characters. The quadrate has a glenoid fossa that is at the same level as the dentary tooth row. The distally tapering ischium is constricted at midshaft length. Other distinguishing traits include the presence of a long retroarticular process, the presence of a lacrimal that is slender and wedge-like, a ratio of humerus to femur length of 0.88, the width of the proximal end of the humerus is half of the length of the humeral shaft, and the presence of subtriangular unguals.

=== Cranium ===
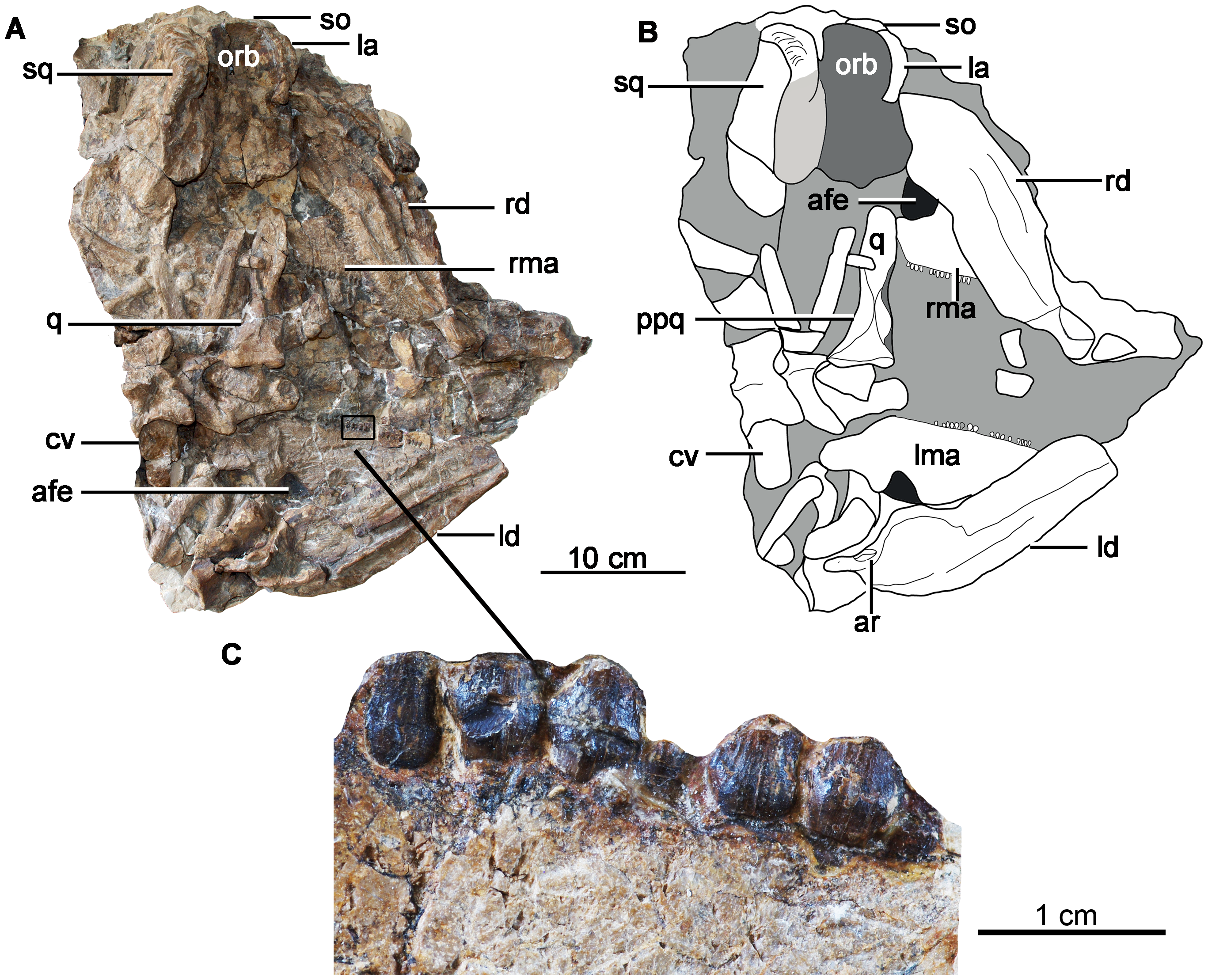
Skull and mandible.

In ventral view, the skull is triangular. The maxilla has a buccal with a notched margin that is shallow and flattened, while an antorbital fenestra is present in the caudodorsal region. A slender, wedge-shaped lacrimal forms the rostral margin of the orbit and a long supraorbital contacts the lacrimal rostroventrally. A bone which might be composed of the squamosal and the postorbital has a subrectangular outline and grooves that are subparallel. The left quadrate has a rectangular head and is straight, with the shaft forming a wide and shallow depression underneath the quadrate head. Unlike nodosaurids, the quadrate isn't fused with the squamosal. The pterygoid process has a transversely expanded ventral end which is composed of two mandibular condyles, and has an outline that is subrectangular. As in most other ankylosaurs, the medial condyle is wider across and extends further towards the underside than the lateral condyle. As in most ankylosaurs, with the exception of Ankylosaurus, the left maxilla has at least 20 alveoli. The rostral maxillary teeth that are preserved are smaller than the caudal teeth, with their crowns being as tall as they are wide and their bases being swollen with a weak cingulum. The teeth lack crescentic cingula. A rostral maxillary tooth crown has small denticles and cusps present. Some of the teeth have denticles that taper with a round cross-section at the base.

The mandible is similar to that of other basal ankylosaurids as it is long and shallow. However, it lacks an osteoderm on the underside margin unlike other basal ankylosaurids. The absence of the osteoderm might be a result of incomplete preservation as it may not have been fused to the mandibular bone due to the immature age of the holotype. If an osteoderm was presents, it might have been restricted to the sides corner of the mandible. The dentary tooth row is not as strongly sinusoidal as those of derived ankylosaurs and is straight. The dentary has at least 20 alveoli present, with most of the teeth missing. The teeth preserved are similar to the maxillary teeth. The symphysis of the right dentary is downturned slightly and the cross-section is sub-triangular. As in nodosaurids, the coronoid eminence projects above the level of the dentary tooth row. Below the coronoid eminence is the large adductor fossa. The retroarticular process is long and slender, while the articular is small. The glenoid fossa is unlike that of other ankylosaurs as it is situated at the same level as the dentary tooth row.

=== Postcrania ===
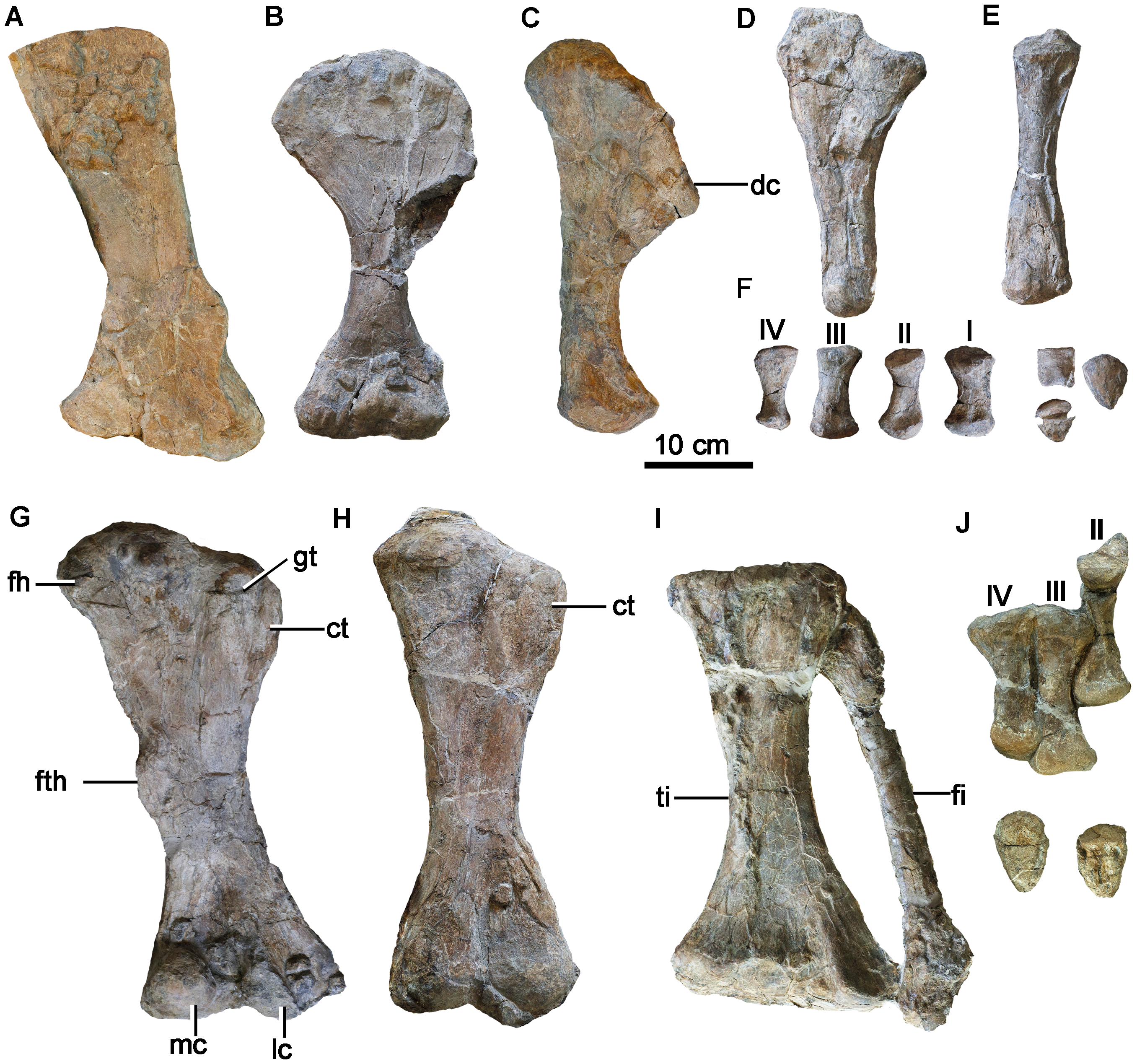
Material of the forelimbs and hindlimbs.

The centra of the cervical and dorsal vertebrae are spool-like. The cervical centra are shorter than they are wide, while the dorsal centra are longer than tall. and the sacral centra are wider than it is long. All of the centra of the dorsal vertebrae lack a ventral keel. The sacral ribs have a dumbbell-shaped outline and are robust. Present on the caudal vertebrae are deep longitudinal grooves. The centrum of a middle caudal vertebra has a square outline in lateral view. The upper part of the sides of the centrum possesses a transverse process that has been reduced to a small nodular process. The neural spines have an arc-shaped outline and are elongated. The facets of the prezygapophyseal face craniomedially, while the postzygapophyses face caudolaterally. The caudal vertebrae have neural spines that join with postzygapophyses, as to form a caudal process which ends cranial to the midpoint of the following vertebrae. The reduction of the size of the postzygapophyses coincides with the reduction of the prezygapophyses. Unlike other ankylosaurids, Chuanqilong lacked a tail club as it lacks the modified handle-like vertebrae in the distal portion of the tail.

The coracoid is not co-ossified with the scapula, which might represent an ontogenetic trait as it is also known in other juvenile ankylosaur specimens. The scapula blade has a rhomboid-like outline, with a dorsal margin that is straight and a ventral margin that is concave. The narrowest point of the scapular blade is towards the head of the glenoid fossa. The ventral edge of the scapula lacks a distinct enthesis, which may also represent an ontogenetic trait. The glenoid fossa has an oval outline and is large. The humerus is short, with a large deltopectoral crest. The proximal end of the femur has a width that is much greater than the width of the distal end. The radial condyle is more prominent than the medial ulna condyle, while the lateral epicondylar ridge is underdeveloped. The ulna has a wedge-shaped olecranon process, as in other immature ankylosaur specimens and may represent an ontogenetic characteristic. The radius is slender and rod-like, with a distal end that is wider transversely than the proximal end of the radius. Only the left manus is known, which consists of four metacarpals that are all slender in appearance. Out of all the metacarpals, metacarpal III is the longest while metacarpal IV is the shorter. The other metacarpals are sub-equal in length. The most robust metacarpal is metacarpal I, while metacarpals II and IV are the slenderest. The distal and proximal ends if all the metacarpals are expanded. The ungual phalanges have a triangular outline with a sharp point, while the ventral surfaces are flattened.

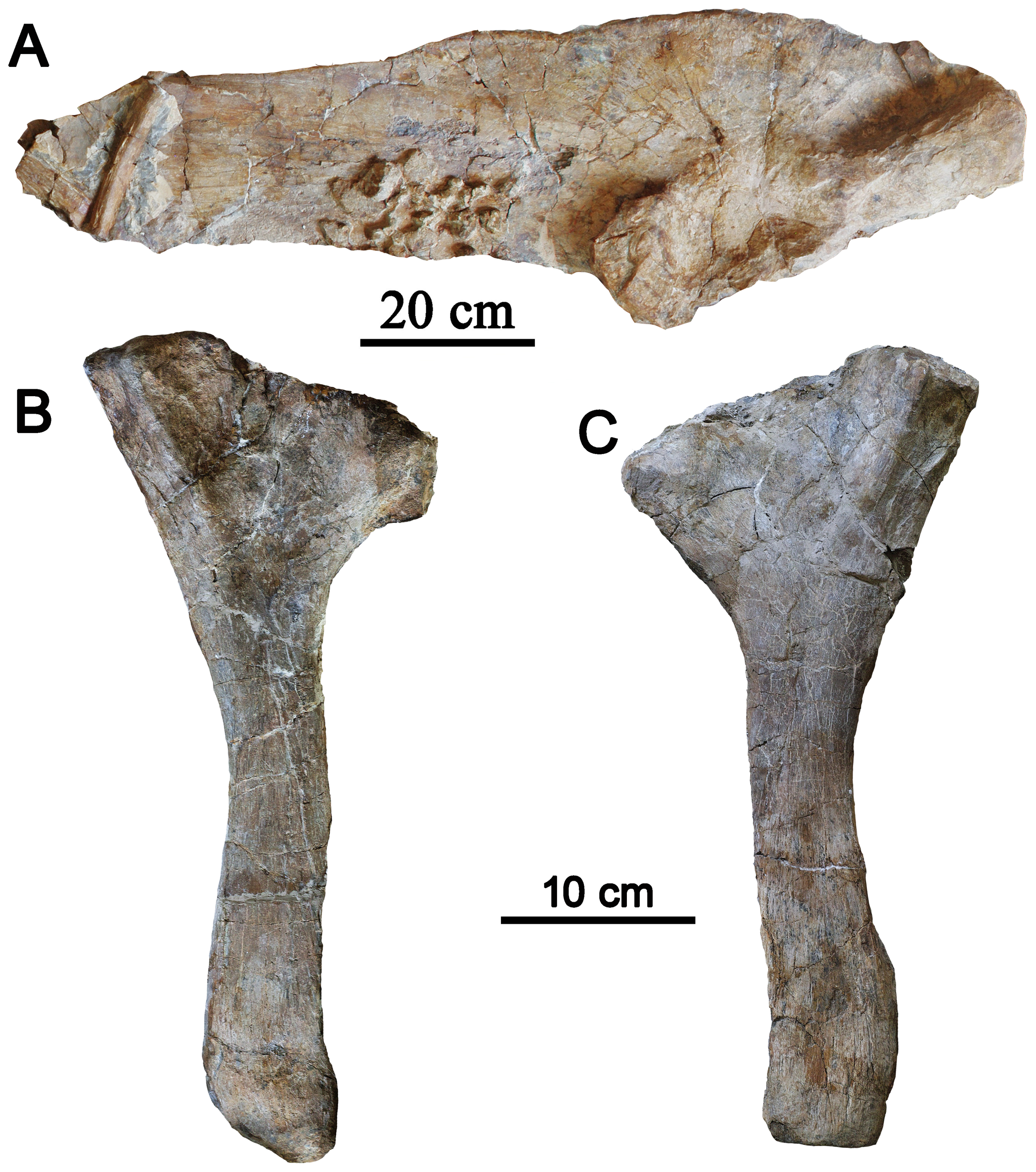
Ilium and ischia.

The preacetabular process of the ilium is long and is rotated towards the middle, while the postacetabular process is rotated in apposition. The preacetabular process diverges sideways from the vertebral column and has a straight side margin. The postacetabular process has a subtriangular outline and is shorter than the acetabulum. The pubic peduncle has a profile that is sub-rounded and developed, while the ischial peduncle is undeveloped. The ischium is long, lacks an obturator process and has a slender shaft that curves slightly towards the underside. The mid-shaft region of the ischium is narrow and widens towards the distal end before tapering further distally. The ischium has a proximal end that is straight in side view, unlike the convex and fan-like ischium of Ankylosaurus and the concave proximal ischia of Struthiosaurus.

As typical with other ankylosaurs, the femur is both robust and straight. The femoral head forms an articular surface that is circular. The femur possesses both the cranial and greater trochanters, which are separated from the femoral head by a tightening. The cranial trochanter is separated from the greater trochanter, which is seen in juvenile ankylosaur specimens but not in most adult ankylosaurs. However, this may rather represent a plesiomorphic trait of ankylosaurids, as well as a trait under ontogenetic control in some ankylosaurs, due to the cranial trochanter being also present in some nodosaurids. Present on the femur is a shallow cranial intercondylar fossa. Chuanqilong has a similar ratio of humerus to femur length to Ankylosaurus, but lower than that of other juvenile ankylosaur specimens and Hungarosaurus. The tibia is shorter than the femur and robust, with the proximal end having a transverse expansion that is weaker then that of the distal end of the tibia. Slightly shorter than the tibia is the fibula, which is slender and has a shaft that is oval in cross-section, as well as being relatively equal in size. The right foot preserves metatarsals II, III, and IV in articulation. The longest and most robust metatarsal is metatarsal III, while metatarsals II and IV are both sub-equal in length. All of the preserved metatarsals have proximal and distal ends that are expanded. The unguals have a sub-triangular outline with distal ends that are sub-rounded and are similar to that of Dyoplosaurus.

=== Armour ===
The only preserved cervical half ring of Chuanqilong consists of a connecting band that is fused into a single plate, but is compressed towards the dorsal and ventral sides and is also segmented into four sections. Of these sections, the right three have a subrectangular outline and are arched upwards, while the left section has a subtriangular profile and tapers caudolaterally. The shoulder region preserves two osteoderm plates that are large, flat, thickened and have a subrectangular outline. The largest of these osteoderm plates is twice the length of the other and are both similar to the osteoderms of cervical half ring but may also represent separate cervical osteoderm plates. Between the proximal end of the left ulna and radius is a small triangular osteoderm that has a wide base and tapers distally. Present near the left ischium is an oval osteoderm that is sharply keeled along the midline. Preserved over the entirety of the body are a diverse range of osteoderms and ossicles that are small and irregular.

== Classification ==
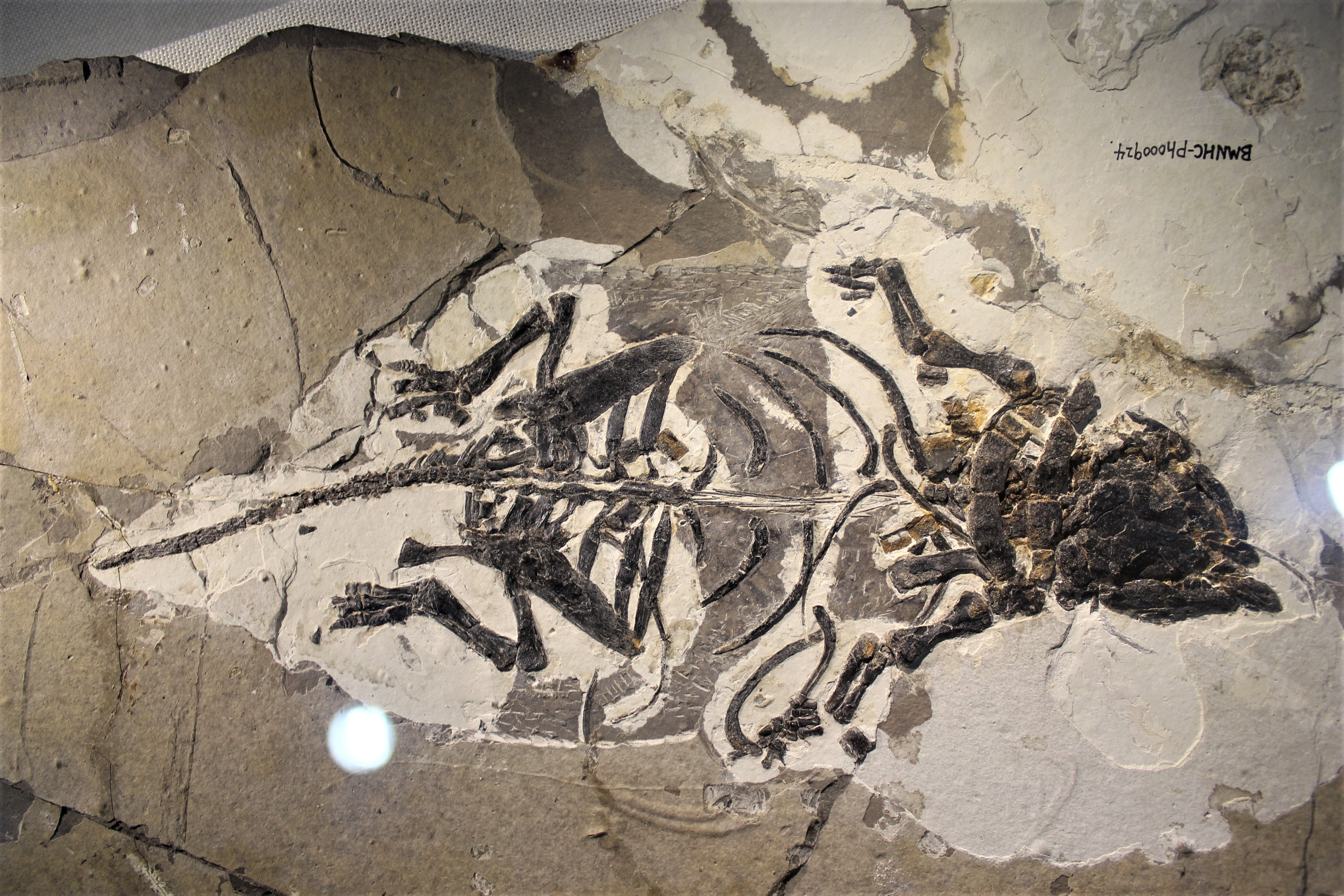
A specimen of Liaoningosaurus, a potential senior synonym of Chuanqilong.

Han et al. (2014) originally found Chuanqilong to be a basal ankylosaurid that was sister taxon to Liaoningosaurus. The authors noted that only two unambiguous synapomorphies supported its close relationship to Liaoningosaurus, which are the presence of an antorbital fossa and a ventrally oriented scapula glenoid. The authors also noted that, although both taxa are represented by juvenile specimens and are sister taxa, Chuanqilong can be differentiated from Liaoningosaurus based on a number of characteristics such as the differences in the metatarsus to metacarpus length ratio and the morphology of the cheek tooth crown. Cladistic analyses conducted by Arbour & Currie (2015) recovered Chuanqilong as either being within a polytomy with other basal ankylosaurids or as sister taxon to Cedarpelta, a position also recovered by Arbour et al. (2016). Analyses conducted by Arbour & Evans (2017), Zheng et al. (2018) and Park et al. (2019) similarly placed Chuanqilong within a polytomy with other basal ankylosaurids, although the inclusion of certain taxa such as Aletopelta within the internal node varied. Rivera-Sylva et al. (2018) also recovered it within a polytomy in a strict consensus tree, but it was also recovered it as sister taxon to Cedarpelta in a 50% majority rule tree. Contrary to other analyses, Frauenfelder et al. (2022) found Chuanqilong to be within a clade including Liaoningosaurus and Cedarpelta outside of Ankylosauridae and Nodosauridae. In 2019, an abstract suggested the possibility that Chuanqilong and Liaoningosaurus may represent the same species but at different ontogenetic stages.

Below is a reproduced phylogenetic analysis from Arbour & Currie (2015).

- Ankylosauridae
  - - Gastonia
    - Ahshislepelta
  - - Aletopelta
    - Liaoningosaurus
    - - Cedarpelta
      - Chuanqilong
    - - - Gobisaurus
        - Shamosaurus
      - - Crichtonpelta
        - - Tsagantegia
          - "Zhejiangosaurus"
          - - Pinacosaurus grangeri
            - Pinacosaurus mephistocephalus
          - - - Saichania
              - - Tarchia
                - Zaraapelta
            - - Dyoplosaurus
              - - - Talarurus
                  - Nodocephalosaurus
                - - - Ankylosaurus
                    - Anodontosaurus
                  - Euoplocephalus
                  - - Scolosaurus
                    - Ziapelta

== Paleoenvironment ==
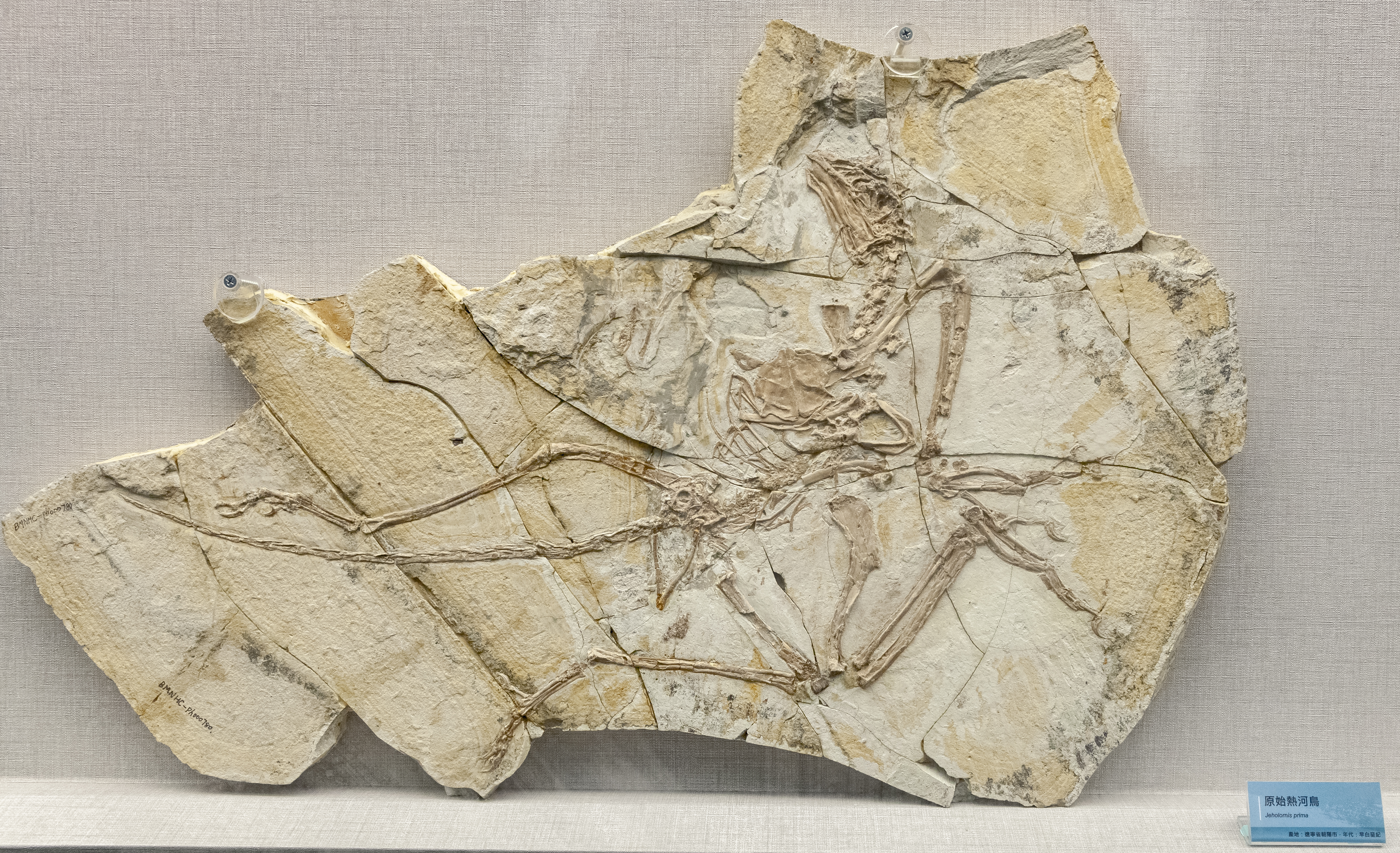
A specimen of Jeholornis, an avialan contemporaneous with Chuanqilong.

The remains of Chuanqilong were uncovered from the Jiufotang Formation of the Jehol Group. The formation is composed of mudstones, siltstones, shales, sandstones and tuffs, and overlies the Yixian Formation. Recent secondary ion mass spectrometry (SIMS) zircon U-Pb analyses suggest that the formation dates to the late Barremian to Aptian stages of the Early Cretaceous, ca. 122.0–118.9 Ma. Both the Yixian and Jiufotang Formations represent freshwater lacustrine environments that lacked rivers as well as many other variable features of freshwater settings, and would have fluctuated seasonally between semi-arid and mesic conditions. The Jiufotang Formation experienced infrequent volcanic activity, while the younger Yixian Formation had more frequent activity. A combination of regional volcanism and the presence of many shallow lakes allowed the exceptional preservation of fossils and the preservation of integument impressions, cartilage and keratin.

A variety of forms of Euornithines (such as Mengciusornis, Piscivoravis, Parahongshanornis, and Yanornis) and Enantiornithines (such as Cuspirostrisornis, Longipteryx, Rapaxavis, Sinornis, and Yuanchuavis) are present in the Jiufotang Formation. Numerous pterosaurs are also known from the formation including the chaoyangopterids Chaoyangopterus, Eoazhdarcho, Jidapterus and Shenzhoupterus, the ctenochasmatid Forfexopterus, the anhanguerids Guidraco and Liaoningopterus, the lonchodraconid Ikrandraco, the istiodactyliforms Hongshanopterus, Liaoxipterus, Linlongopterus and Nurhachius, the tapejarid Sinopterus, the anurognathid Vesperopterylus and the indeterminate pterodactyloid Pangupterus. Other fauna present include the jeholornithiforms Jeholornis and Kompsornis, the omnivoropterygids Omnivoropteryx and Sapeornis, the oviraptorosaur Similicaudipteryx, the dromaeosaurid Microraptor, the tyrannosauroid Sinotyrannus, the ceratopsian Psittacosaurus, the mammaliamorphs Fossiomanus and Liaoconodon, and the choristoderes Philydrosaurus, Ikechosaurus and Liaoxisaurus.
