= 1953 in paleontology =

List of years in paleontology	(table)
- … 1943; 1944; 1945; 1946; 1947; 1948; 1949; 1950; 1951; 1952; 1953; 1954; 1955; 1956; 1957; 1958; 1959; 1960; 1961; 1962; 1963 …
- In science 1950 1951 1952 1953 1954 1955 1956
- Art; Archaeology; Architecture; Literature; Music; Philosophy; Science; +...

Paleontology or palaeontology is the study of prehistoric life forms on Earth through the examination of plant and animal fossils. This includes the study of body fossils, tracks (ichnites), burrows, cast-off parts, fossilised feces (coprolites), palynomorphs and chemical residues. Because humans have encountered fossils for millennia, paleontology has a long history both before and after becoming formalized as a science. This article records significant discoveries and events related to paleontology that occurred or were published in the year 1953.

== Plants ==
=== Angiosperms ===
Name	Novelty	Status	Authors	Age	Type locality	Location	Notes	Images
Holmskioldia speirii	Comb nov	jr synonym	(Lesquereux) MacGinitie	Late Eocene	Florissant Formation	United States; Colorado	A mallow relative. moved from Porana speirii (1883); Moved to Florissantia speirii (1992)	Florissantia speirii

== Dinosaurs ==
Name	Novelty	Status	Authors	Age	Type locality	Location	Notes	Images
Brachylophosaurus	Gen. et sp. nov.	Valid	Sternberg	Cretaceous; Campanian	Oldman Formation	Canada (Alberta)	A hadrosaurid The type species is B.canadensis	
Chiayusaurus	Gen. et sp. nov	Nomen dubium	Bohlin	Late Jurassic	Kalazha Formation	China	An indeterminate eusauropod The type species is C. lacustris	
Heishansaurus	Gen. et sp. nov.	Nomen dubium	Birger Bohlin	Cretaceous; Campanian	Minhe Formation	China	An ankylosaurid The type species is H. pachycephalus.	
Microceratops	Gen. et 2 sp. nov.	jr homonym	Bohlin	Cretaceous; Campanian	Minhe Formation	China	A ceratopsian The type species is M. gobiensis Genus also includes M. sulcidens of the Xinminbao Group; Genus name preoccupied by Microceratops Seyrig 1952; Genus renamed Microceratus (2008)	
Peishansaurus	Gen. et sp. nov.	Nomen dubium	Bohlin	Cretaceous; Campanian	Minhe Formation	China	An ankylosaurid The type species is P. philemys	
Sauroplites	Gen. et sp. nov	Valid	Bohlin	Cretaceous (Barremian to Aptian)	Zhidan Group	China	A nodosaurid the type species is S. scutiger	
Stegosaurides	Gen. et sp. nov.	Nomen dubium	Bohlin	Early Cretaceous	Xinminbao Group	China	A nodosaurid The type species is S. excavatus	
Troodon bexelli	Sp. nov.	jr synonym	Bohlin	Cretaceous; Turonian	Ulansuhai Formation	China	First named as a Troodon species Moved to Stegoceras bexelli (1964); Moved to Tylocephale bexelli (1978); Moved to Sinocephale bexelli (2021).	

== Synapsids ==
=== Non-mammalian ===
Name	Status	Authors	Age	Location	Notes	Images
Aloposauroides	Valid	Brink and Kitching	Late Permian	South Africa		
Sycocephalus	junior synonym	Brink and Kitching	Late Permian	South Africa; Zambia		
