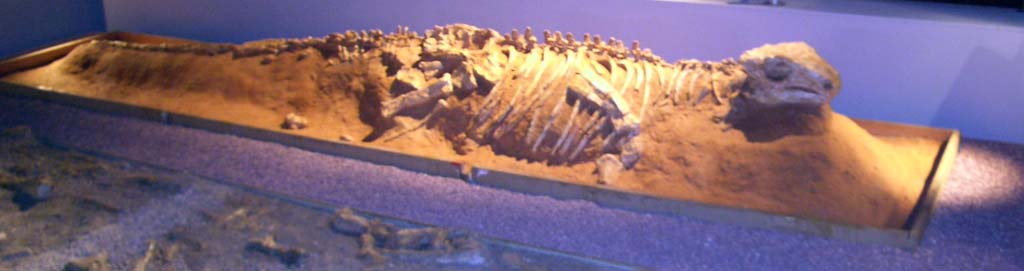
- Fossil in the Hong Kong Science Museum

Scientific classification
- Kingdom: Animalia
- Phylum: Chordata
- Class: Reptilia
- Clade: Dinosauria
- Clade: †Ornithischia
- Clade: †Thyreophora
- Clade: †Ankylosauria
- Family: †Ankylosauridae
- Subfamily: †Ankylosaurinae
- Genus: †Pinacosaurus; Gilmore, 1933

Type species
- †Pinacosaurus grangeri Gilmore, 1933

Other species
- †Pinacosaurus hilwitnorum Penkalski, 2026

Synonyms
- Pinacosaurus ninghsiensis Young, 1935; Heishansaurus pachycephalus? Bohlin, 1953; Syrmosaurus viminocaudus Maleev, 1952

= Pinacosaurus =

Pinacosaurus Temporal range: Cretaceous, 75–71 Ma

Genus of ankylosaurid dinosaur

Pinacosaurus (meaning "plank lizard") is an extinct genus of ankylosaurid dinosaur that lived in what is now Mongolia and China during the Late Cretaceous (Campanian, roughly 75 to 71 million years ago). The genus contains two species; the type species, Pinacosaurus grangeri, was named in 1933 based on fossils found in 1923. A second species, Pinacosaurus hilwitnorum, was named in 2026. An additional species, originally placed in this genus, P. mephistocephalus, was later transferred to its own genus, Eopinacosaurus.

At least 24 Pinacosaurus skeletons have been found, possibly more than of any other ankylosaur. These predominantly consist of juveniles. Adult fossils have not been found in groups.

Pinacosaurus was a medium-sized ankylosaurine, about 5 metres (16 ft) long and weighed up to 1.9 metric tons (2.1 short tons). Its body was flat and low-slung but not as heavily built as in some other members of the Ankylosaurinae. The head was protected by bone tiles, hence its name. Each nostril was formed as a large depression pierced by between three and five smaller holes, the purpose of which is uncertain. A smooth beak bit off low-growing plants that were sliced by rows of small teeth and then swallowed to be processed by the enormous hind gut. Neck, back and tail were protected by an armour of keeled osteoderms. The animal could also actively defend itself by means of a tail club.

== Discovery and naming ==
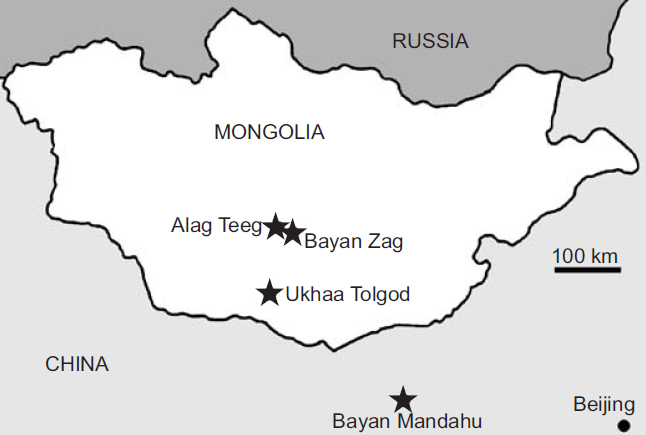
Map of Mongolia showing where Pinacosaurus fossils have been found

The American Museum of Natural History sponsored several Central Asiatic Expeditions to the Gobi Desert in Mongolia in the 1920s. Among the many paleontological finds from the "Flaming Cliffs" of the Djadokhta Formation in Shabarakh Usu (Bayn Dzak) were the original specimens of Pinacosaurus, found by Walter W. Granger in 1923. In 1933, Charles Whitney Gilmore named and described the type species Pinacosaurus grangeri. The generic name is derived from Greek πίναξ, pinax, "plank", in reference to the small rectangular scutes covering the head. The specific name honours Granger, who accompanied the 1923 expedition as a paleontologist. The holotype, AMNH 6523, was found in a layer of the Djadokhta Formation, dating from the Campanian. It consists of a partially crushed skull, lower jaws, the first two neck vertebrae, and dermal bones collected in 1923. The skull is still the largest known of the genus.

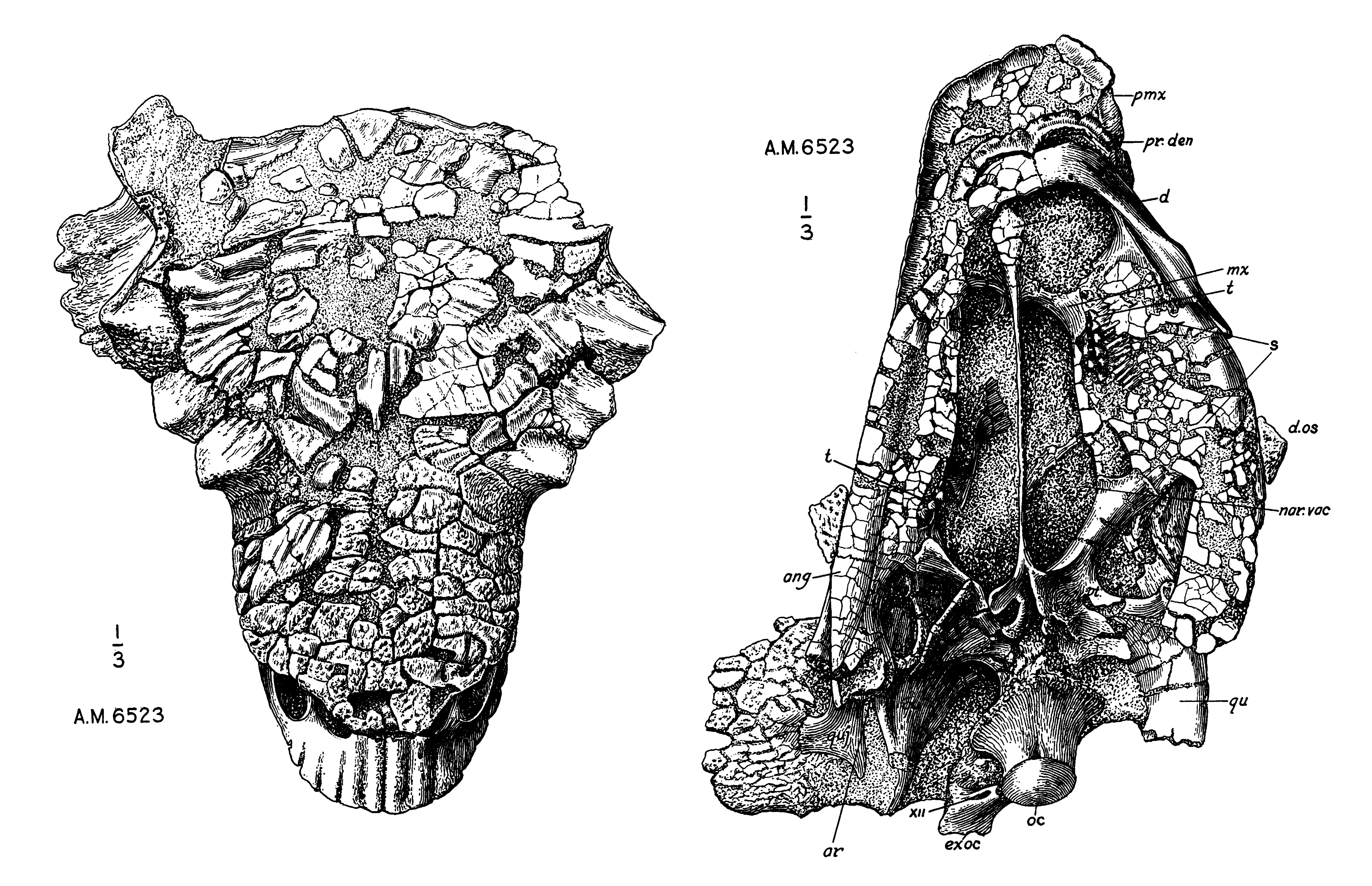
Holotype skull of P. grangeri

In 1923, a well-preserved sacrum with the attached right ilium and part of the presacral rod, caudal vertebrae, a left femur and a dermal scute was collected from the Wangshi Group in Shandong, China by H. C. T'an and Otto Zdansky and was described as Pinacosaurus cf. grangeri by Buffetaut (1995).

Pinacosaurus is the best known Asian or worldwide ankylosaur with numerous specimens having been discovered. From the original Flaming Cliffs or Shabarakh Usu several other fossils have been reported including ZPAL MgD II/1: a nearly complete skeleton; ZPAL MgD II/9: a postcranial skeleton; ZPAL MgD II/31: the handle of a tail club; and PIN 3780/3: a skull; PIN 614: a nearly complete postcranial skeleton (= Syrmosaurus viminocaudus); and possibly MPC 100/1305, a postcranial skeleton erroneously described in 2011 as belonging to Saichania. At another site, Alag Teeg now considered part of the Alagteeg Formation, entire bonebeds have been uncovered of juvenile animals. Soviet-Mongolian expeditions in 1969 and 1970 reported thirty skeletons. Mongolian-Japanese expeditions added another thirty between 1993 and 1998. Forty were reported by Canadian expeditions between 2001 and 2006. The remains have not been all dug up and it is possible the reports partly pertain to the same material.

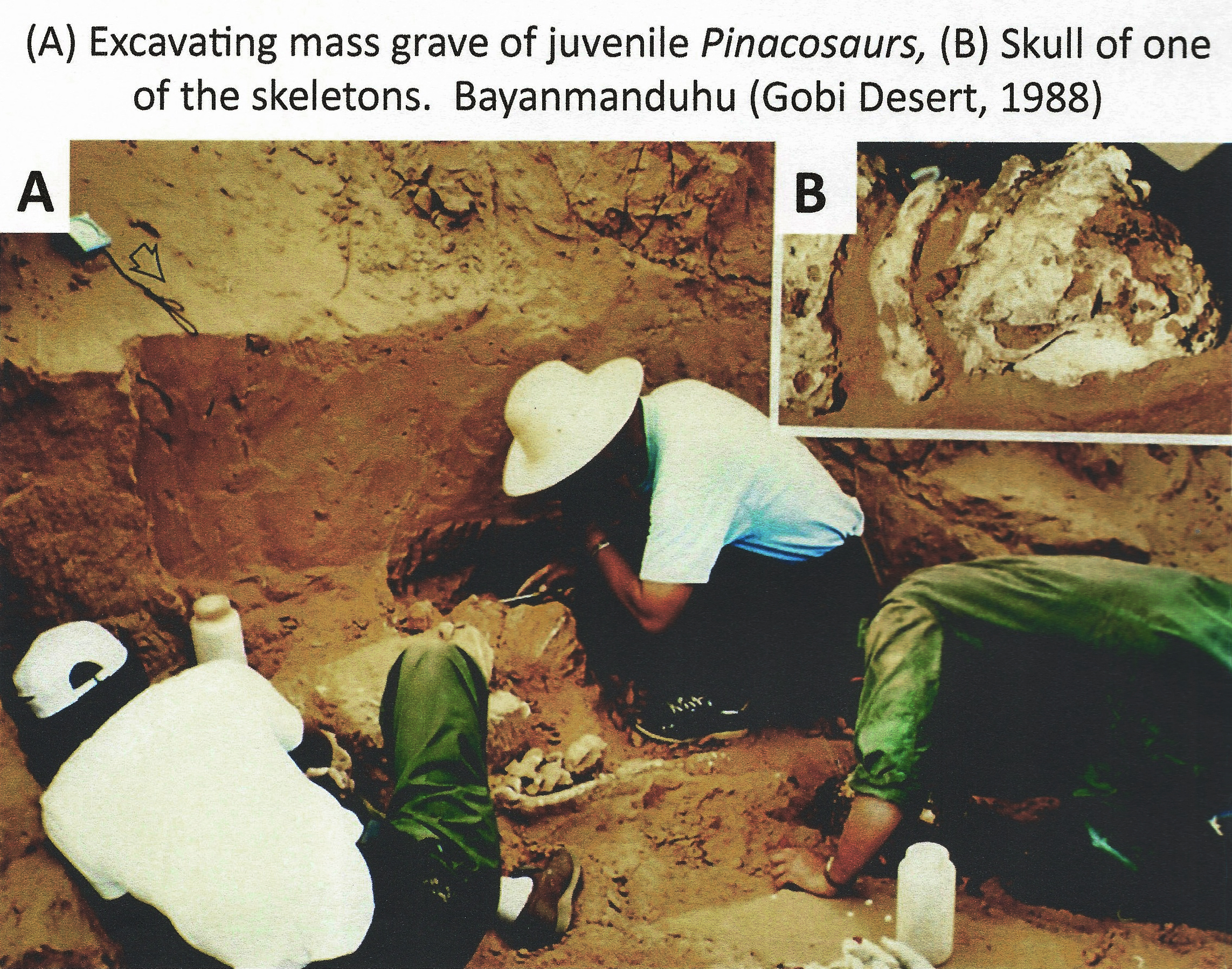
Mass-mortality juvenile specimens from Bayan Mandahu. Under excavation in 1988 (A), and juvenile skull (B)

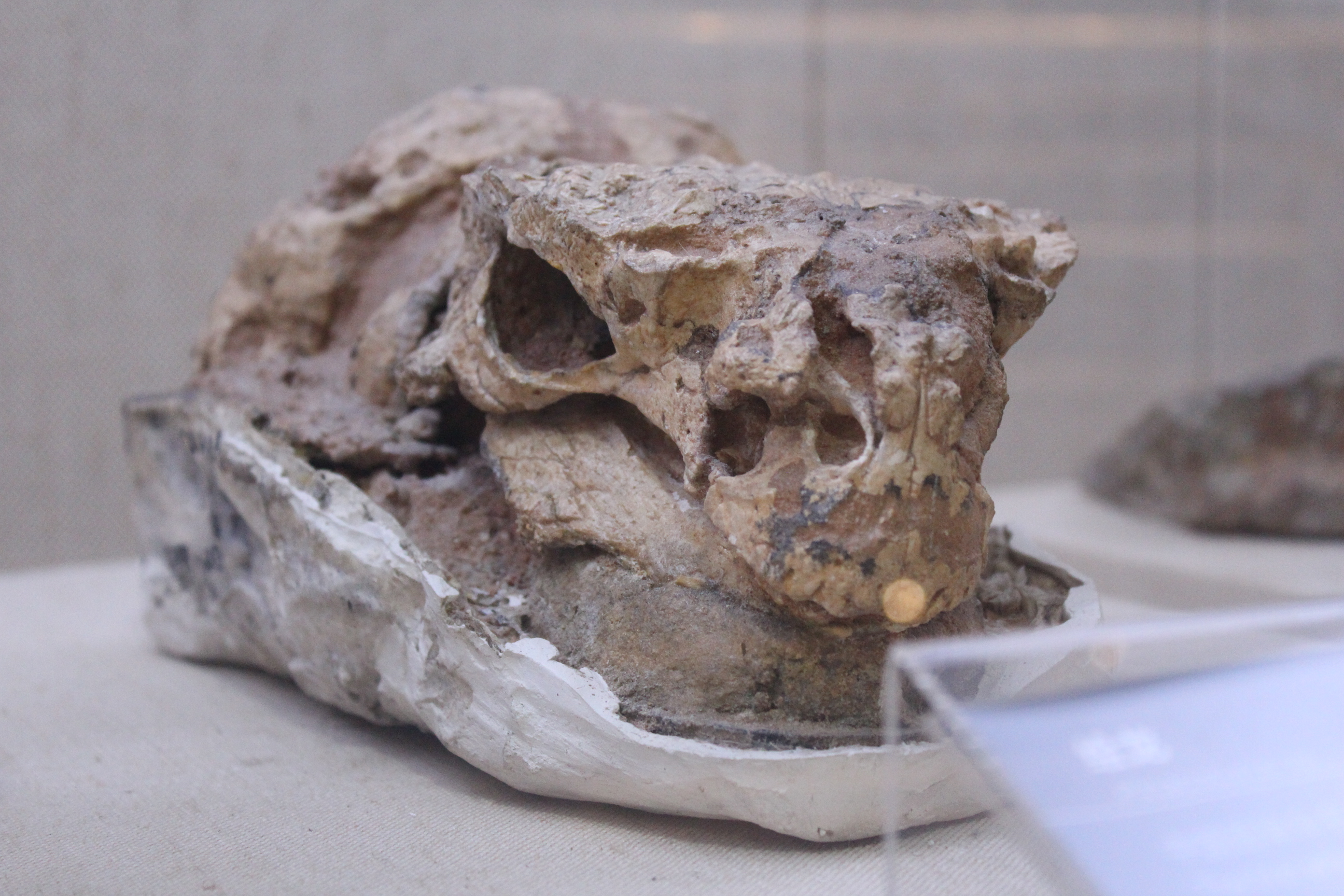
Skull of specimen IVPP V16853, from previous photograph

In Inner Mongolia at the Bayan Mandahu Formation, the Canada−China Dinosaur Project in 1987, 1988, and 1990 found specimens IVPP V16853: a skull with cervical halfrings; IVPP V16283: a partial skull, IVPP V16854: a nearly complete skeleton; IVPP V16346: a partial skull; and IVPP V16855: a skeleton. Other, as yet undescribed material included two finds of several juveniles huddled together, evidently killed by a sandstorm. Whereas ankylosaur skeletons have often been preserved laying on their back, most Pinacosaurus juveniles are found on their belly in a resting position, with the legs tucked in.

Because of the many finds, in principle the entire juvenile skeleton is known. Pinacosaurus especially provides information on the build of the ankylosaurian skull, as in the juveniles the head armour has not yet fused with the skull proper and the sutures of the various elements are still visible. Modern studies have not yet fully covered the abundance of data. A well-preserved juvenile skull was described by Teresa Maryańska in 1971 and 1977. In 2003, Robert Hill studied the juvenile specimen IGM 100/1014. In 2011, Currie published a study on the hand and foot, body parts often incompletely known with other ankylosaurs. The same year Michael Burns dedicated an article to four juveniles from the Bayan Mandahu. Also in 2011, the postcranial skeleton MPC 100/1305 was described in detail, though at the time referred to Saichania. Most recently, Michael Burns and colleagues described and illustrated the original Alag Teeg material from the Soviet-Mongolian expeditions in 1969 and 1970.

=== Additional species and synonyms ===
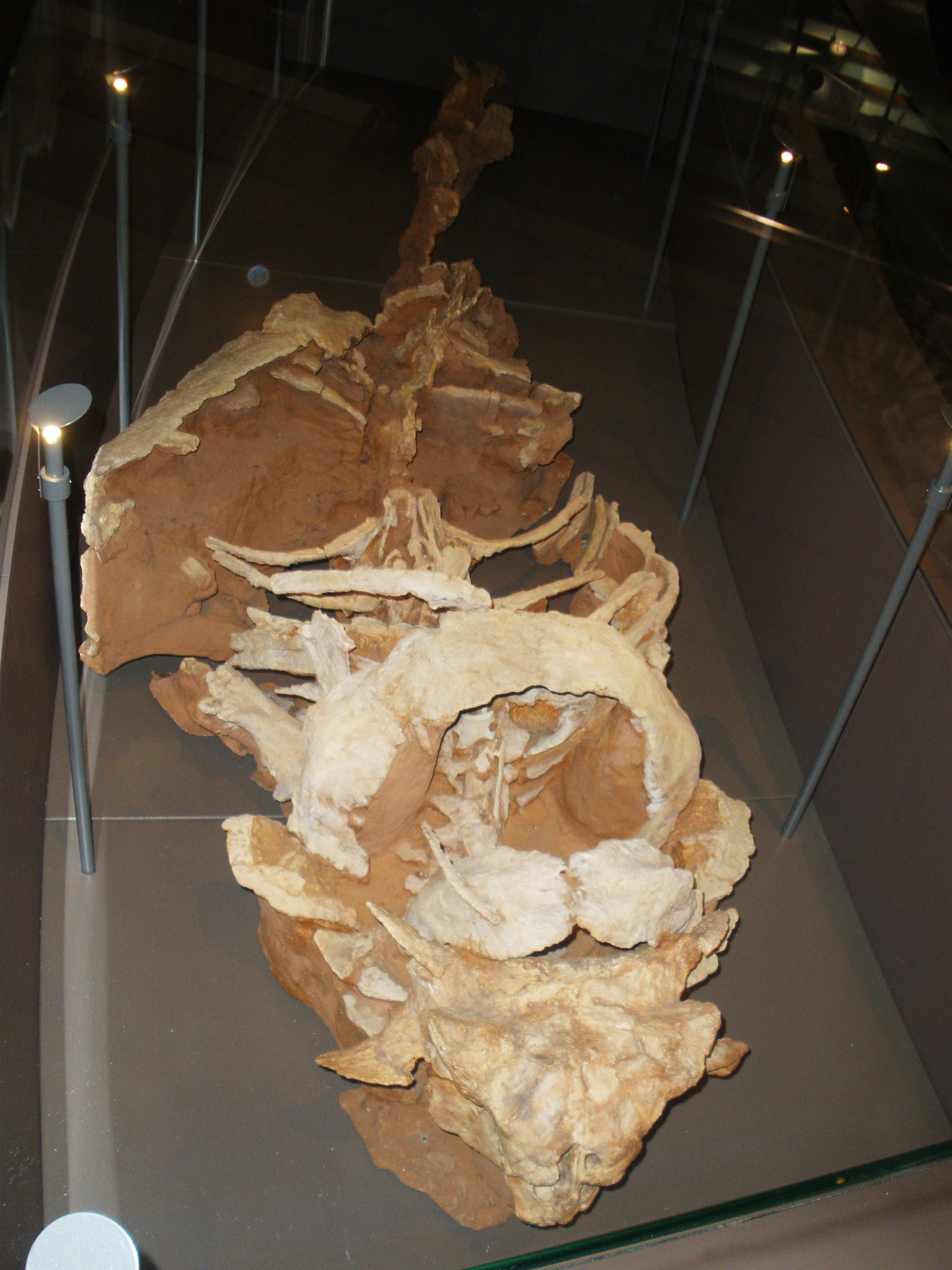
Holotype specimen of Eopinacosaurus

Yang Zhongjian ("C. C. Young") discovered a new specimen in the Ningxia Province at the Bayan Mandahu Formation, and described it as a new species Pinacosaurus ninghsiensis in 1935. The rather complete skeleton lacks a present inventory number; it is now considered to be the same species as P. grangeri. The same is true of fragmentary remains, specimen PIN 614, described as Syrmosaurus viminocaudus by Evgenii Aleksandrovich Maleev in 1952. Arbour, Burns and Sissons (2009) considered Heishansaurus pachycephalus ("thick-headed Black Mountain lizard") from the Minhe Formation, near Heishan (= "Black Mountain"), Gansu Province, which is known from poorly preserved cranial and postcranial fragments, to be a junior synonym of P. grangeri as well. It was first described in 1953 as a pachycephalosaur and had been usually considered a nomen dubium. In 2015, Arbour and Currie again concluded it was a nomen dubium.

In 1996, a Belgian-Chinese expedition discovered a large and articulated skeleton in the Bayan Mandahu Formation. It was named as Pinacosaurus mephistocephalus, holotype specimen IMM 96BM3/1, by Pascal Godefroit et al. in 1999. The specific name is a contraction of Mephistopheles and Greek κεφαλή, kephalè, "head", in reference to the "devilish" squamosal horns. In 2010, Gregory S. Paul suggested that P. mephistocephalus were a junior synonym of P. grangeri. It was considered a valid species by Robert Hill in 2012, based on the "secondary dermal" (squamosal) horns and narial characteristics. Arbour and Michael Burns have confirmed that the species was valid. In 2026, Paul Penkalski transferred P. mephistocephalus to its own genus, Eopinacosaurus, based on various differences in the skull and cranial osteoderms.

In 1995, Eric Buffetaut referred ankylosaurian remains found in Shandong to a Pinacosaurus sp.

== Description ==
=== Size and distinguishing traits ===
Size compared to an average human male

Pinacosaurus was a lightly built, medium-sized animal, fully grown individuals reached a total length of 5 m (16 ft). Gregory S. Paul estimated its body mass at 1.9 t (4,200 lb), while Thomas R. Holtz estimated it to have a body mass of a horse. The postcranial skeleton PIN 614 measures 3.66 m (12.0 ft) from the first neck vertebrae to the end of the tail.

In 2015, Arbour and Currie established some distinguishing traits of the genus. The upper snout armour does not consist of distinct tiles, caputegulae, but of a fused mass. Adult individuals have a skull that is longer than wide. This trait is shared with the distant relatives Gobisaurus and Shamosaurus, but Pinacosaurus differs from those in the possession of extra openings in the nostril and a pointy protruding caputegula on the prefrontal, directed to the front. Pinacosaurus differs from Crichtonpelta in the lack of an ornamented rear edge of the skull roof and in the cheek horn not being curved upwards.

Arbour and Currie also provided a list of traits in which P. grangeri and P. mephistocephalus differed from each other. P. grangeri has a notch in the snout armour just above the innermost nostril opening. P. mephistocephalus has squamosal horns extending to behind beyond the rear of the skull roof, their points representing the widest point of the skull, instead of the upper rims of the eye sockets. P. mephistocephalus also has a clear transverse narrowing of the skull roof at level of the lacrimals, just in front of the eye sockets. It had been suggested that the rear skull roof of P. mephistocephalus was more convex but Arbour and Currie concluded it essentially had the same curvature. The holotype of P. mephistocephalus has very long cheek horns but a juvenile specimen, MPC 100/1344, found as part of a P. grangeri group, shows a similar elongation.

=== Skull ===
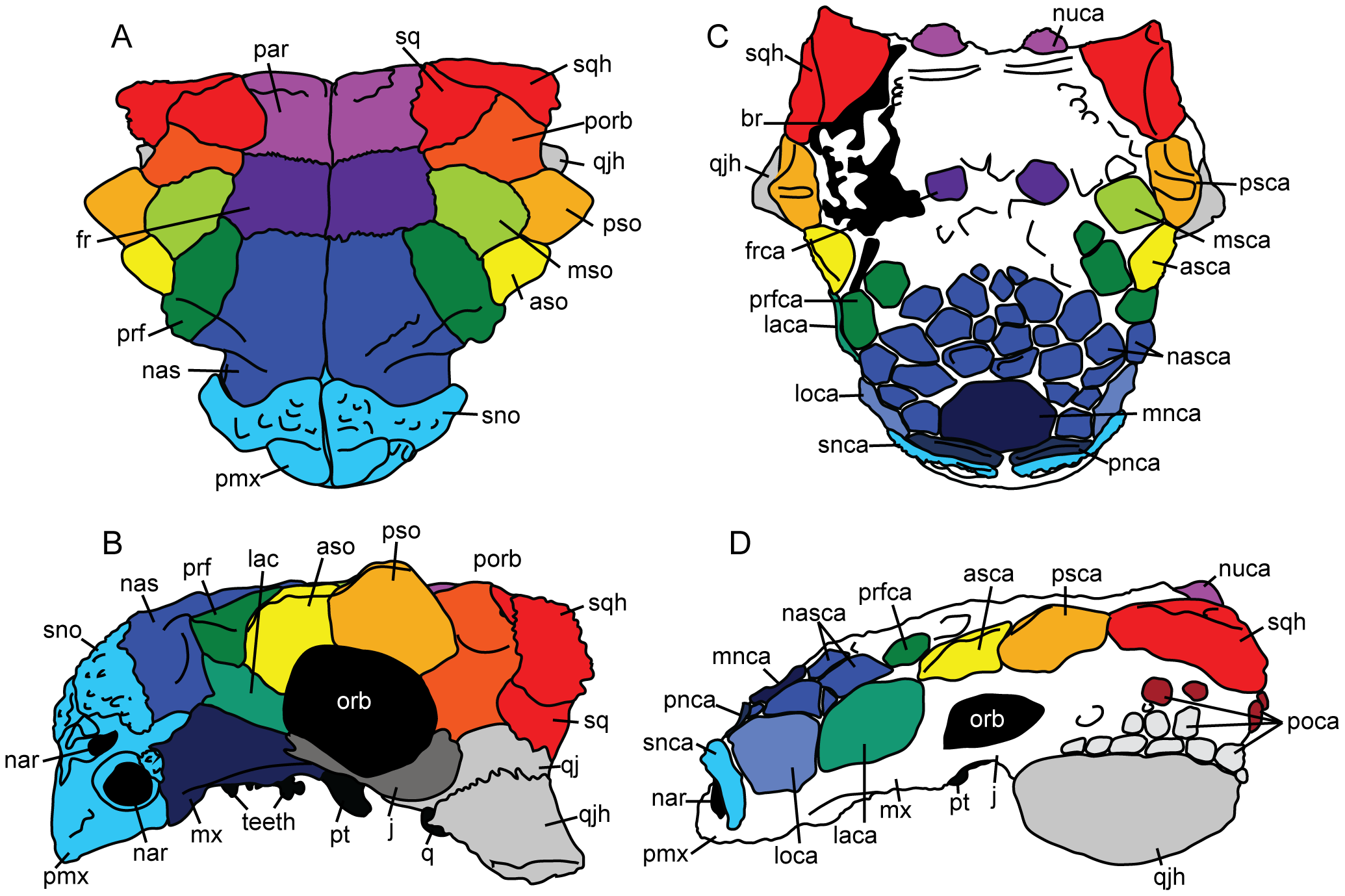
The skull of a juvenile Pinacosaurus grangeri on the left, compared with that of Anodontosaurus lambei

The adult skulls known have a length of about thirty centimetres. Pinacosaurus has exceptionally smooth praemaxillae, front snout bones, forming the bone core of the upper beak, that was in life covered with a horn sheet. The maxilla bears about fourteen teeth. A typical and remarkable element of ankylosaurine skulls is that the nostril is in the shape of a large "narial vestibule" in which several smaller oval holes are present. With Pinacosaurus there are at least three per side. Gilmore already noticed this configuration in the original specimen. To allow a comparison between the holes of the several ankylosaurine species, they have been dubbed "A", "B" and "C". The top hole A seems to access the main air-passage of the nasal cavity. In P. grangeri this hole is visible in top view through a notch in the snout armour, whereas in P. mephistocephalus the armour overhangs the hole. The opening pattern is characteristic of the genus: in Pinacosaurus the C hole is below the A hole and the B opening is on the lower outer side of the vestibule. In Pinacosaurus juveniles the C hole seems to consist of secondary smaller openings of varying number: Godefroit et al. described four pairs of openings in total in 1999, and in 2003 a juvenile specimen with five pairs of openings was described. The extra C openings have been named C2 and C3. The precise function of this arrangement is unclear. There are several chambers in the praemaxilla and maxilla to which these holes are connected but it has also been suggested that some extra holes are the result of damage. The larger number with juveniles could be explained by cartilage sheets not having been ossified yet.

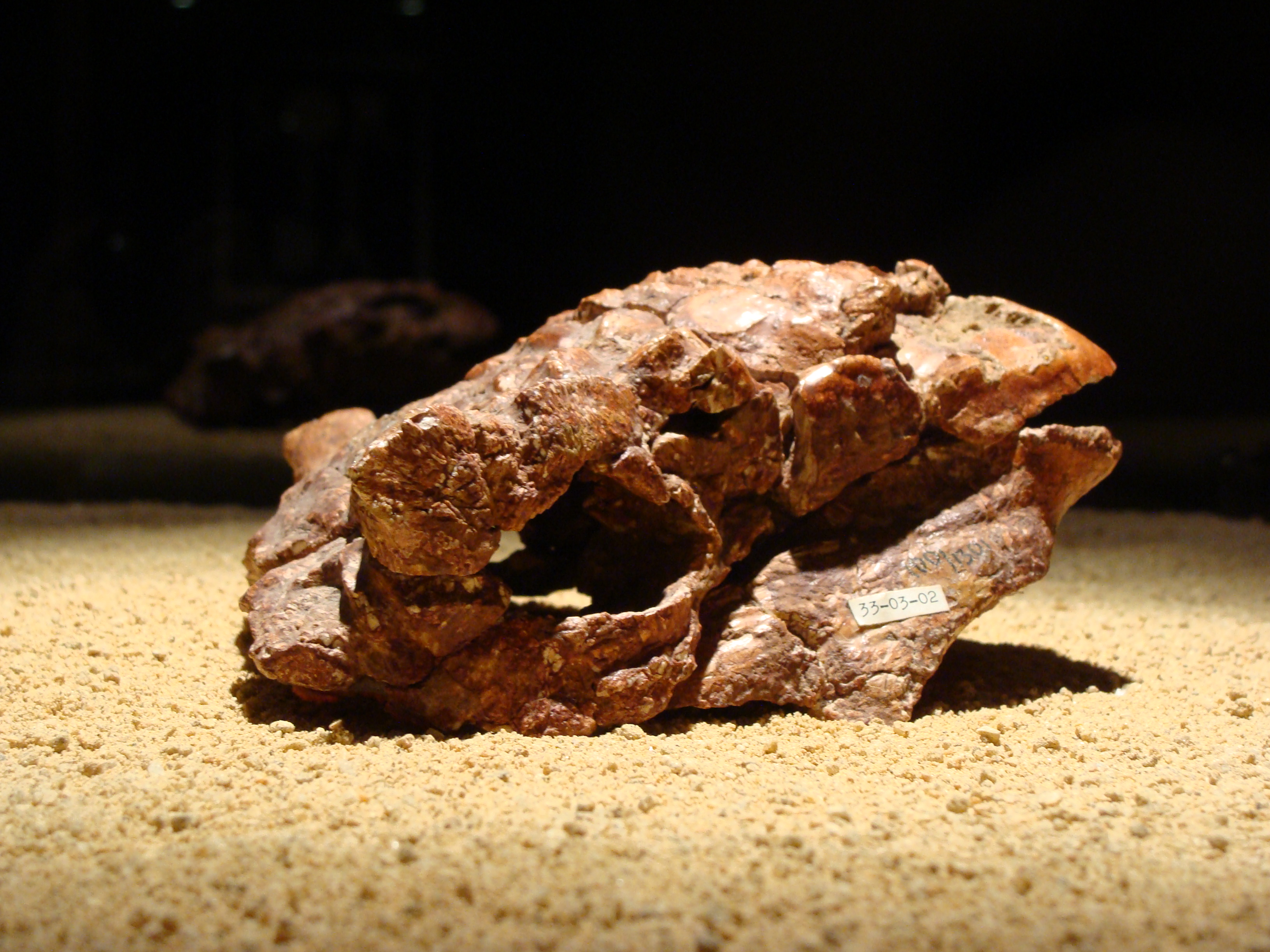
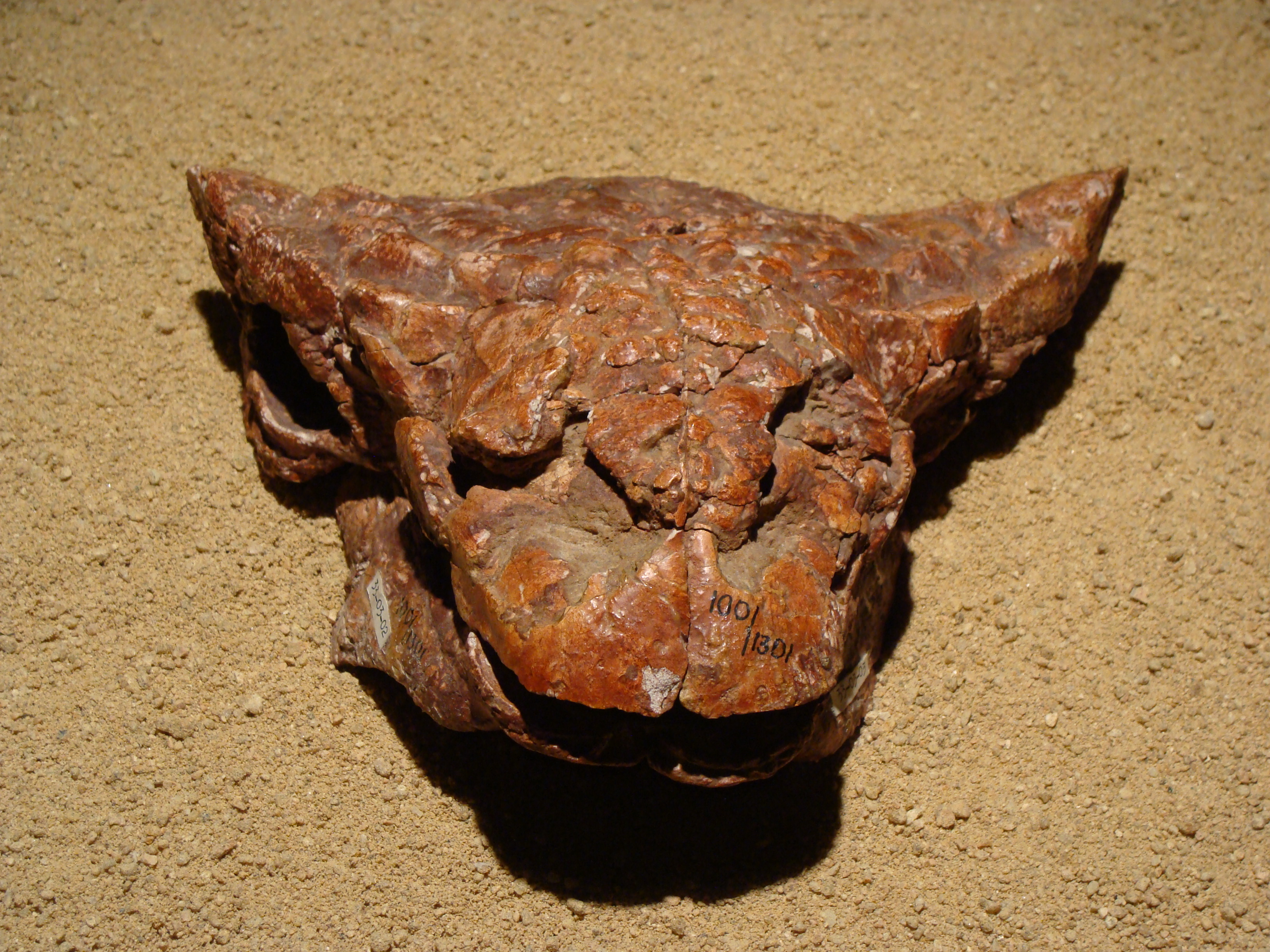
P. grangeri skull from the side and front

The visible sutures of the skull elements in juvenile specimens allowed for the first time to determine their precise arrangement. They generally consisted of indistinctly formed simple shapes. Several skull openings like the antorbital fenestra and the temporal fenestrae apparently closed at a very young age for they are no longer visible even in the juveniles found. The squamosal horn does not cover the entire squamosal, creating the illusion that an additional skull bone is present in front of the horn. Maryańska in 1977 thought that this was a tabular bone, otherwise unknown in dinosaurs, proving that the Ankylosauria had independently evolved from the Aetosauria, a hypothesis today entirely discarded. Godefroit in 1999 called it a "secondary dermal squamosal". A real distinctive trait is that the quadratojugal touches the postorbital, whereas in other Thyreophora for which the condition is known, these bones are separated by the jugal. Usually it is assumed that this configuration is not unique for Pinacosaurus but a synapomorphy of the Ankylosauridae as a whole.

In 2015, a juvenile specimen was described showing a complex hyoid bone or tongue bone apparatus. It included paraglossalia at the sides, paired first and second ceratobranchials and higher epibranchials. Also the bone structure suggested that in the middle a cartilaginous basihyal was present. The strong development of the hyoid would indicate that a powerful tongue compensated for the weakly developed dentition. It was inferred that all dinosaurs had such complex tongue bones but that these were generally lost during fossilisation. However, some of these bones from the specimen were later reinterpreted as the larynx.

=== Postcranial skeleton ===
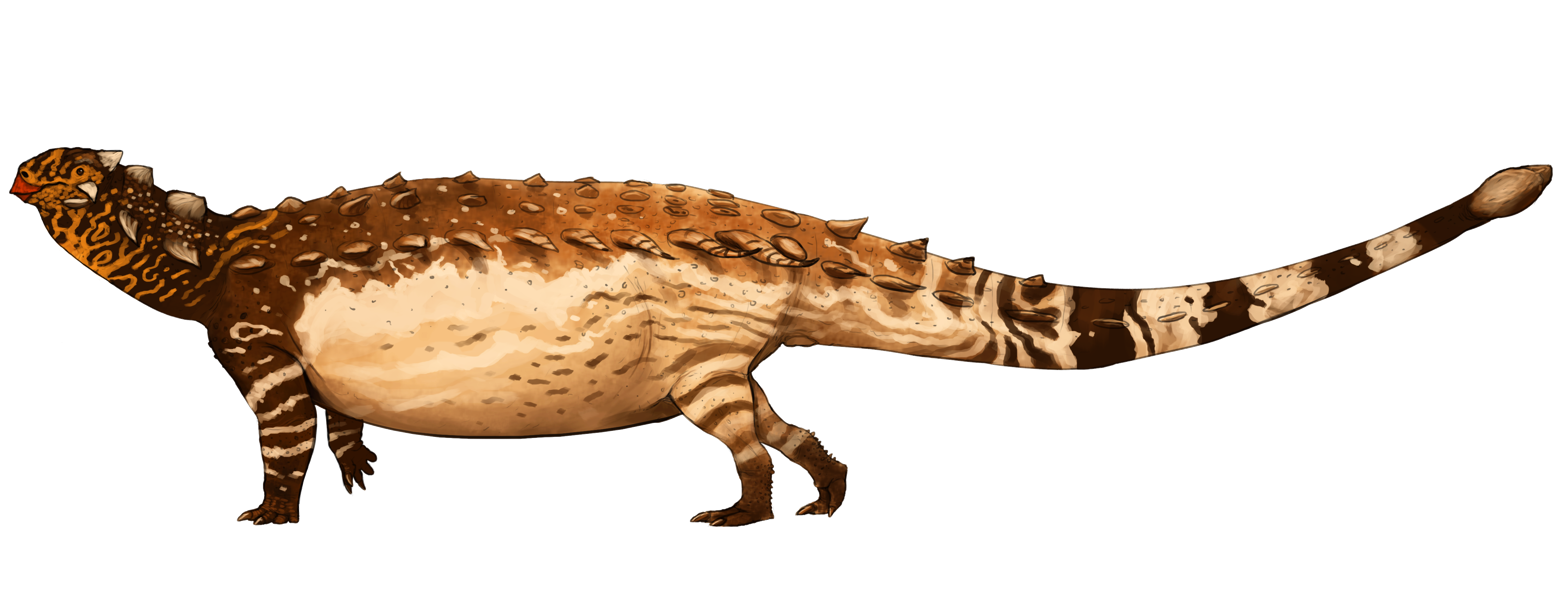
Life restoration of P. grangeri

The postcranial skeleton of the known fossils is rather lightly built. Most of these represent juveniles; however, even specimen IMM 96BM3/1, the P. mephistocephalus holotype, is no longer than about 3 m (9.8 ft). Juveniles had four fused posterior vertebrae forming a "sacral rod", three true sacra, and a tail base of seven vertebrae with transverse processes. Behind these are about eight "free" vertebrae, followed by about twenty vertebrae stiffened by projections and forming the "handle" of the tail club. Like all ankylosaurids, Pinacosaurus had a bony club at the end of its tail, which it likely used as a defensive weapon against predators. This club was relatively small.

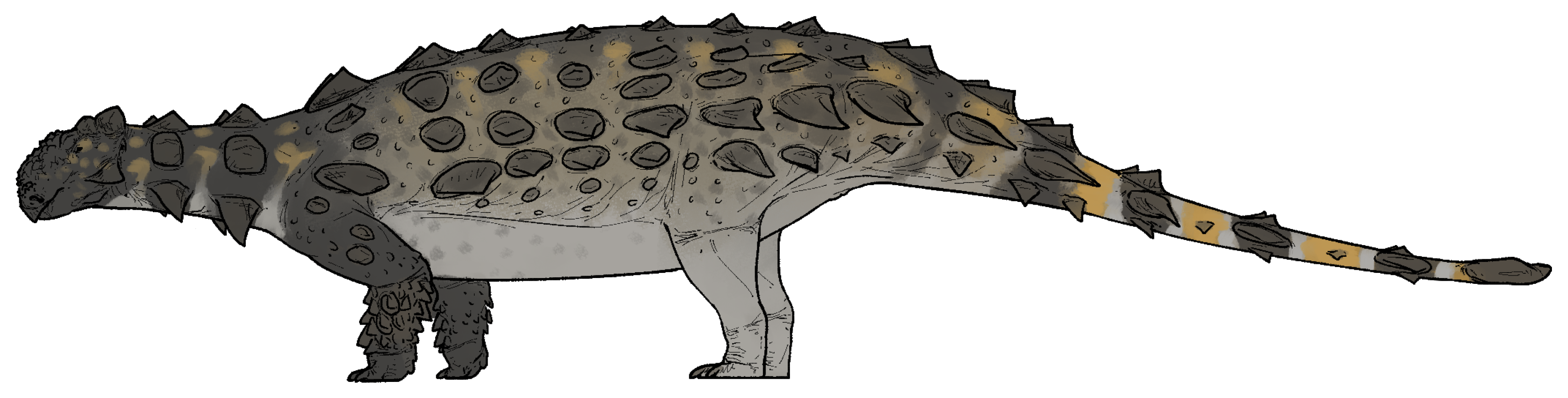
Life restoration of P. hilwitnorum

The torso is very flat. The forelimbs are moderately robust; the P. mephistocephalus holotype has quite robust humerus and ulna, however. The hand is completely known, which is exceptional for ankylosaurids. It has five digits, and the phalangeal formula is 2-3-3-3-2, meaning that the innermost finger of the forelimb has two bones, the next has three, etc. The metatarsals are closely appressed and held vertical. The claws are hoof-shaped.

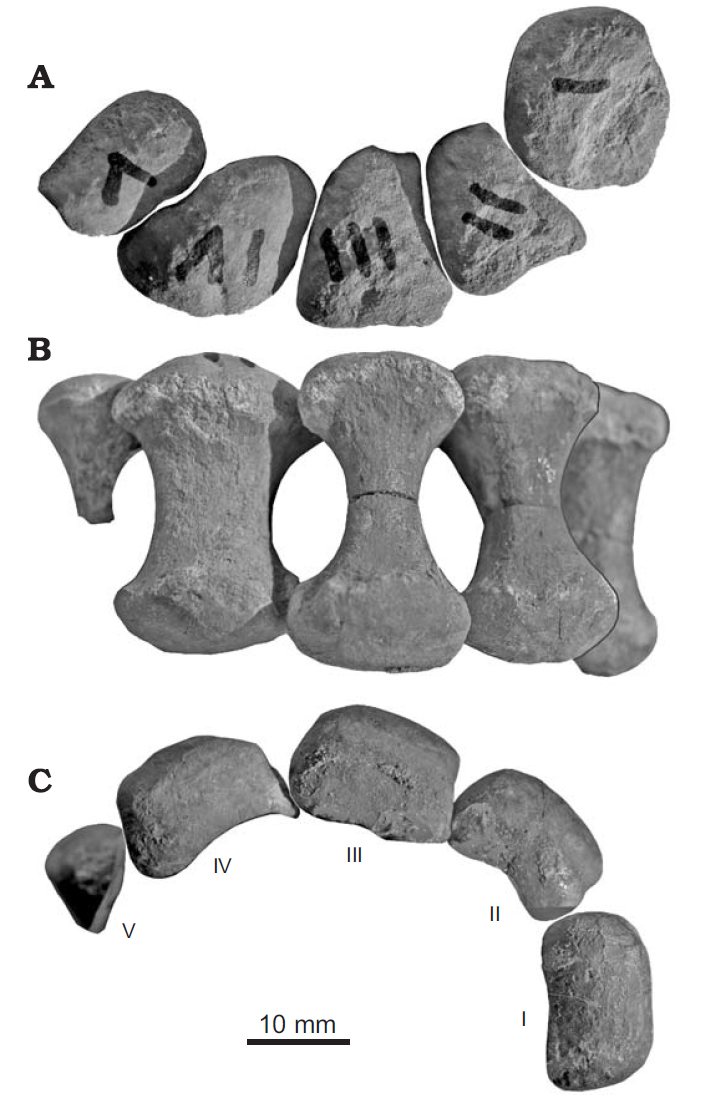
Metacarpus of a juvenile specimen

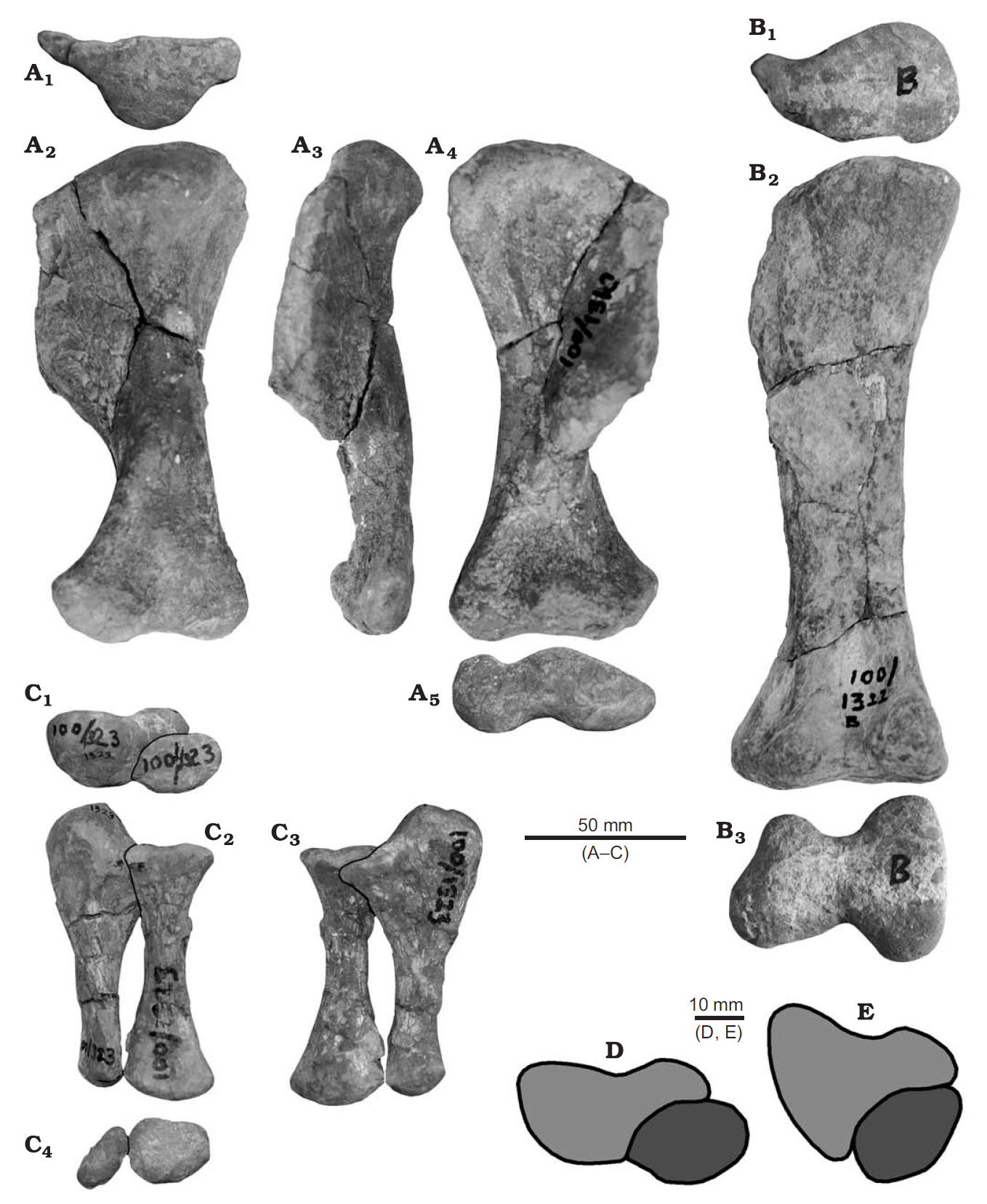
Limb bones

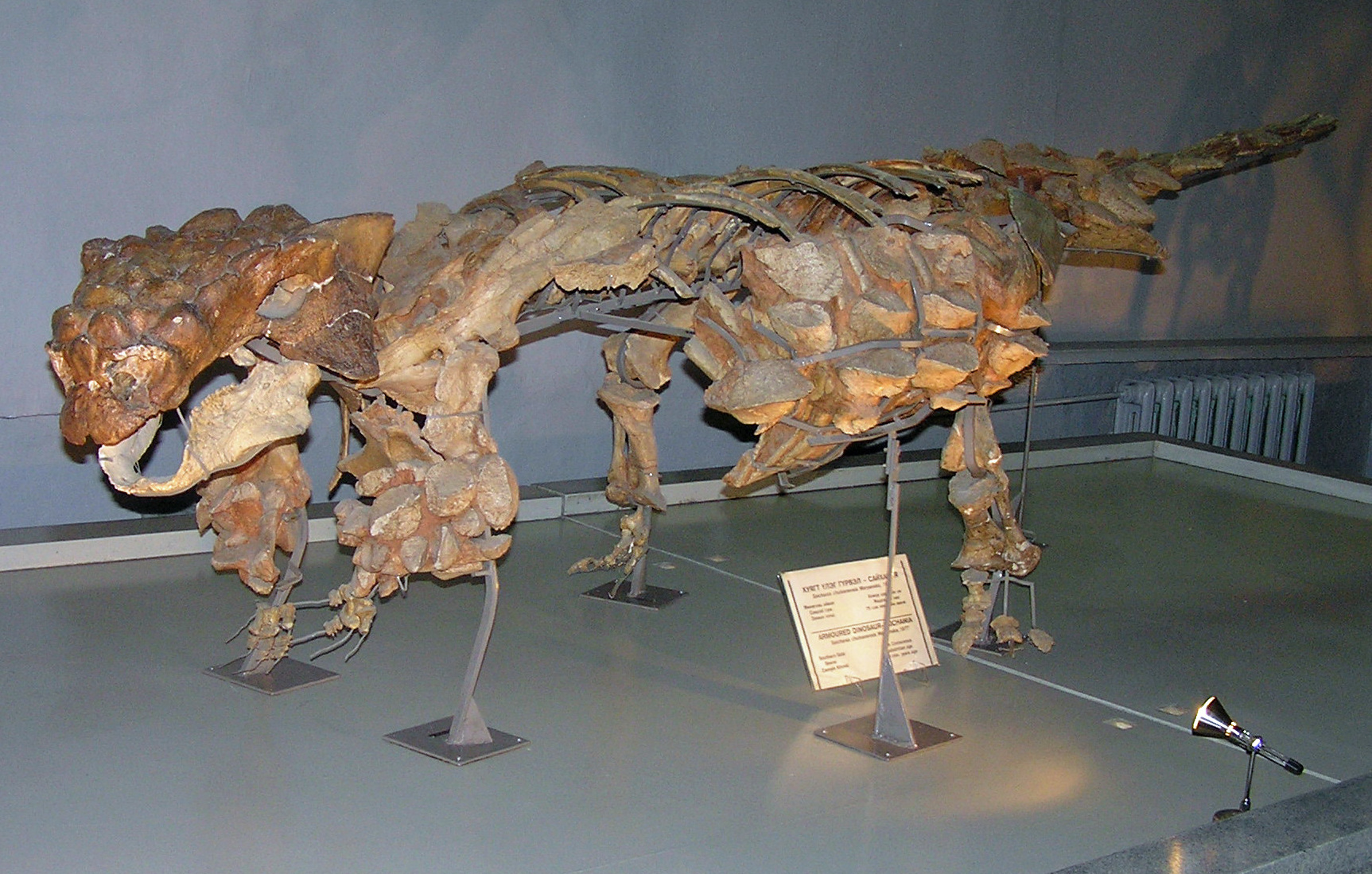
MPC 100/1305 with Saichania skull cast, showing armour on back and limbs

In the pelvis, the ilia flare strongly outwards to the front. The ischium is thin and curves forwards. The hindlimbs are moderately robust. The shinbone has a wide underside with well-formed condyles. Currie therefore assumed that the lower leg articulated directly with the metatarsus, the inner part of the astragalus and the entire calcaneum being absent or non-ossified cartilage elements. As in all known ankylosaurids, the foot has three toes, not four as Maryańska assumed in 1977, misled by the damaged specimen ZPAL MgD−II/9. The phalangeal formule of the toes is variable: most individuals have 0−3−3−4−0 but some exemplars possess an extra penultimate phalanx in the third toe, resulting in 0-3-4-4-0, while others lack a phalanx in the fourth toe, which causes a 0-3-3-3-0 configuration.

The configuration of the skin ossifications, or osteoderms, of the body is partly known: no single specimen conserves a complete set. Additional information can be gleaned from the larger specimen MPC 100/1305, a possible Pinacosaurus exemplar. The neck is protected by two cervical halfrings, consisting of keeled rectangular segments fused to an underlying bone band. This band is completely ossified even in juvenile individuals. Godefroit assumed Pinacosaurus differed from other species in having three or four segments instead of the usual six, but Arbour concluded that the normal number was in fact present. The sides of the rump and the tail were occupied by moderately long, flat, recurved, triangular spikes. Parallel rows of smaller oval keeled osteoderms were present on the back. A continuous "sacral shield" on the hip, made of fused plates, is absent.

== Classification ==
Originally placed in the Nodosauridae by Gilmore, Pinacosaurus is now considered to be an ankylosaurid and a likely member of the Ankylosaurinae. As indicated by Thompson et al. 2012, the difference in the relative position of the two Pinacosaurus species between the respective analyses, is influenced by the fact that the best preserved P. grangeri skulls are from juveniles, while the holotype of P. mephistocephalus is an adult.

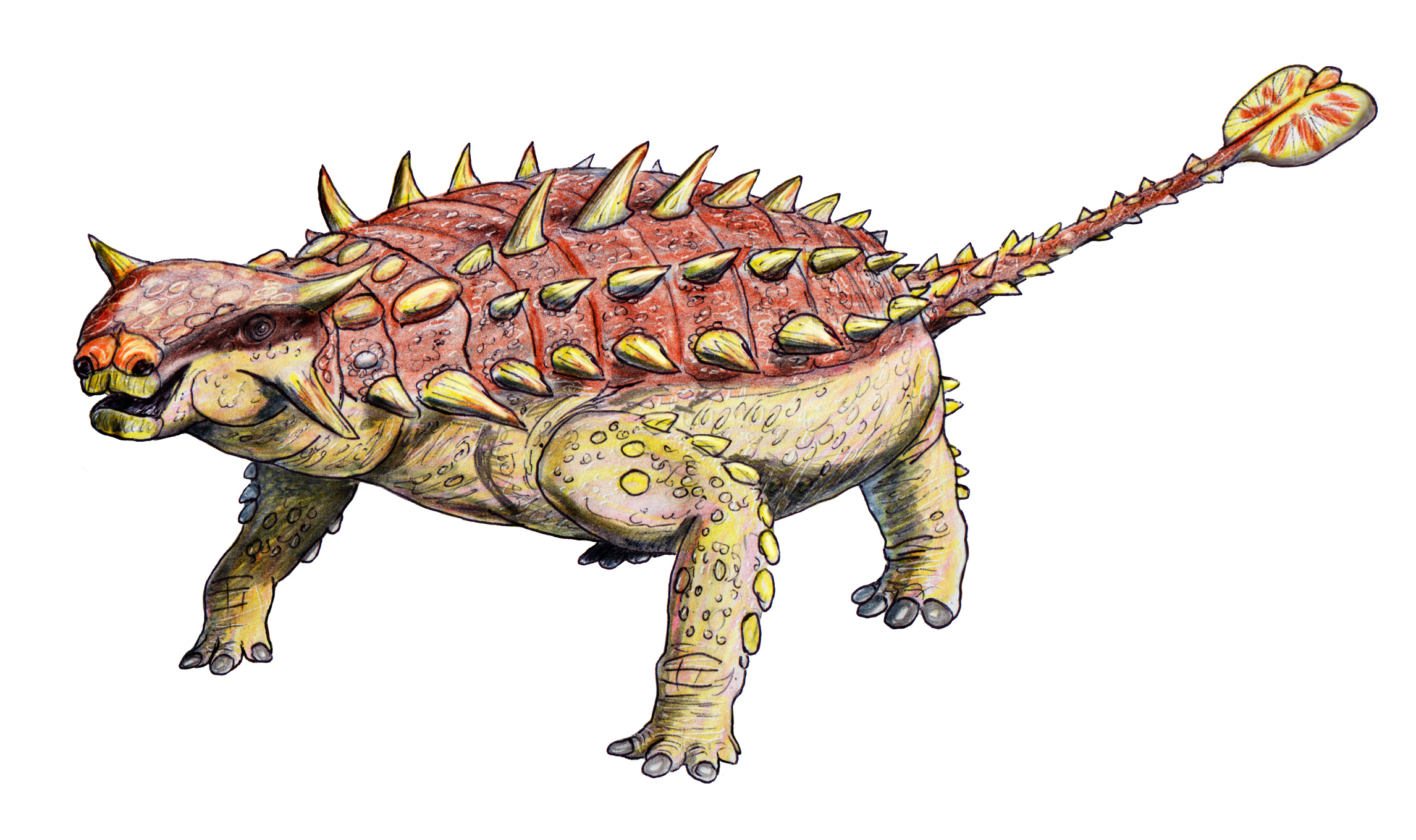
Restoration of P. grangeri

The following cladogram is based on the 2015 phylogenetic analysis of the Ankylosaurinae conducted by Arbour and Currie:

- Ankylosaurinae
  - Crichtonpelta
  - - Tsagantegia
    - Zhejiangosaurus
    - Pinacosaurus
    - - - Saichania
        - - Tarchia
          - Zaraapelta
      - Ankylosaurini
        - Dyoplosaurus
        - - - Talarurus
            - Nodocephalosaurus
          - - - Ankylosaurus
              - Anodontosaurus
            - Euoplocephalus
            - - Scolosaurus
              - Ziapelta

== Paleobiology ==
=== Diet ===
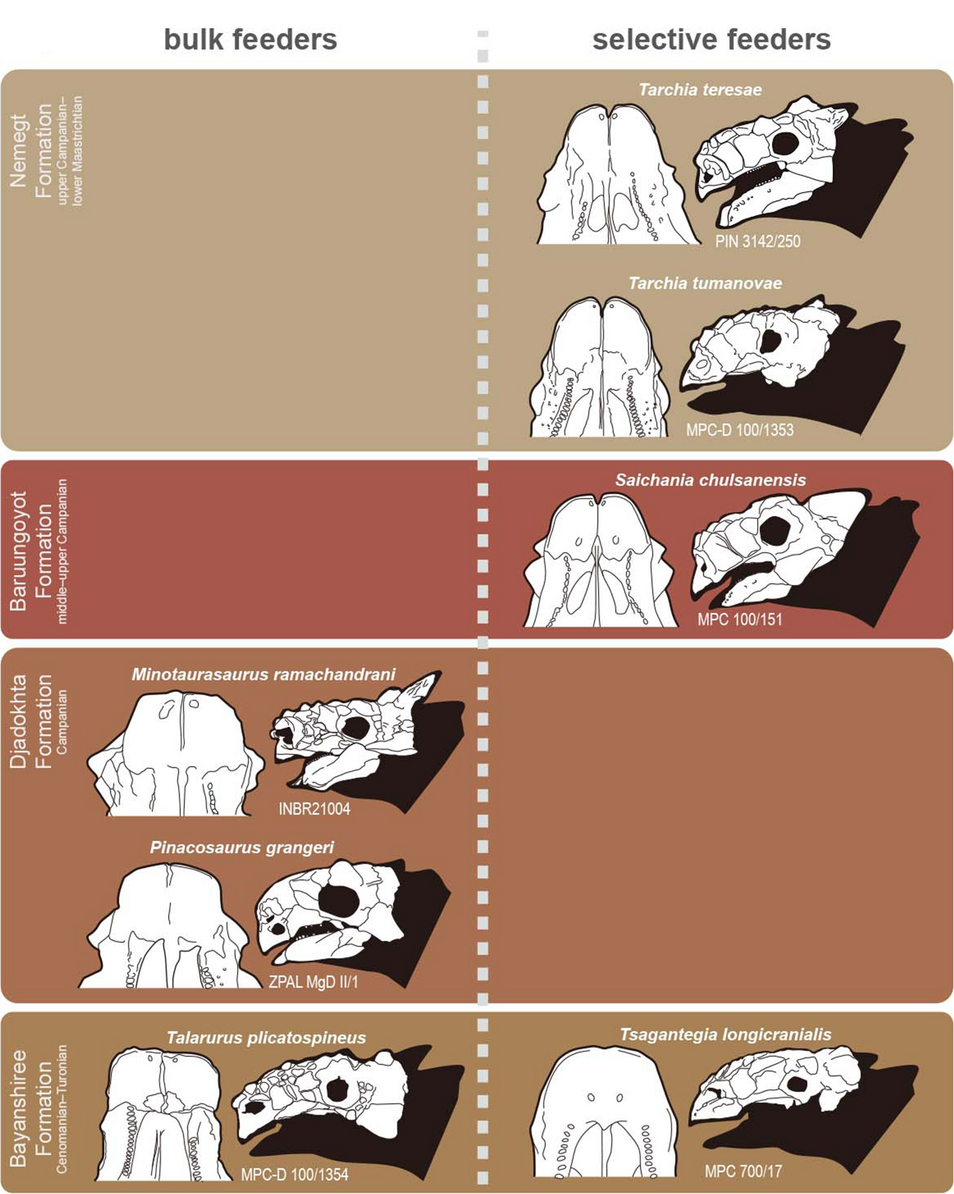
Snout morphology and diet of Mongolian ankylosaurids; P. grangeri in left

A juvenile specimen of Pinacosaurus preserves large paraglossalia (triangular bones or cartilages located in the tongue) which show signs of muscular stress, and it is thought this was a common feature of ankylosaurs. Pinacosaurus and other ankylosaurs likely relied heavily on muscular tongues and hyobranchia (tongue bones) when feeding, since their teeth were fairly small and were replaced at a relatively slow rate. Some modern salamanders have similar tongue bones, and use prehensile tongues to pick up food. Though Pinacosaurus may not have fed on fibrous and woody plants, they may have had a more varied diet, including tough leaves and pulpy fruits. Inversely, this might suggest ant-eater-like insectivorous behaviour.

=== Growth ===
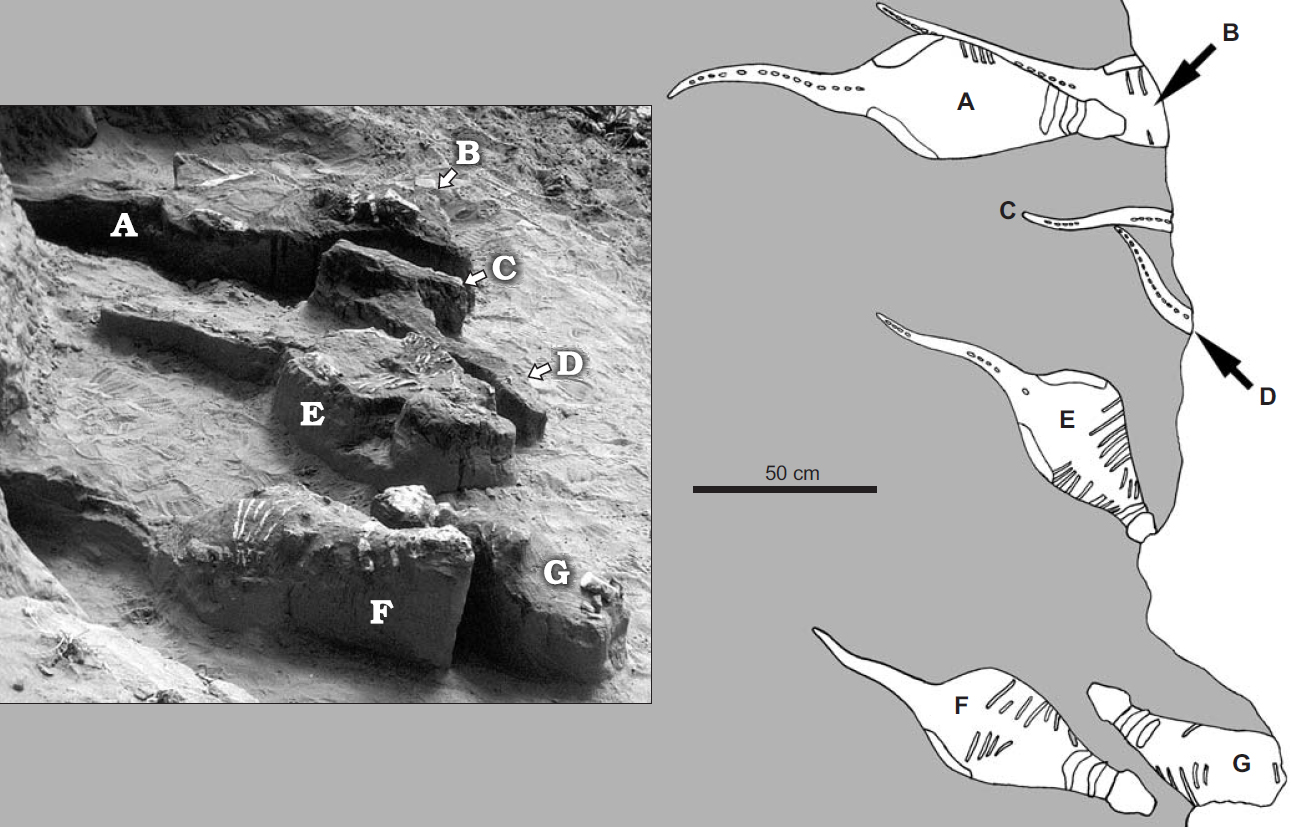
Mass-mortality juveniles from Bayan Mandahu, showing quarry map

In the group of juveniles found together at Bayan Mandahu, the individuals were all oriented into the same direction, suggesting they represent a travelling true herd simultaneously killed and covered by a sandstorm. It is remarkable that the members of such groups are all of about the same age, having an average length of circa 1.5 metres. This could be explained by the larger individuals being able to extract themselves from the sand, leaving the small members of the herd behind but in that case it is strange that no very young animals were found, the smallest being about one metre in length. The concentration of fossils at Alag Teeg has been explained as caused by a drying pool, but later research showed the sediments were deposited during a flood. During their ontogenetic development, in juveniles at first the ribs fused with their vertebrae. The forelimbs strongly increased in robustness, while the hindlimbs did not become larger relative to the rest of the skeleton, indicating that the arms bore most of the weight. In the cervical halfrings, the underlying bone band developed outgrowths connecting it with the underlying osteoderms, which simultaneously fused to each other. On the skull, the caputegulae first ossified at the snout and the rear rim; gradually the ossification extended towards the middle regions. On the rest of the body, the ossification process progressed from the neck onwards in the direction of the tail.

=== Vocalization ===
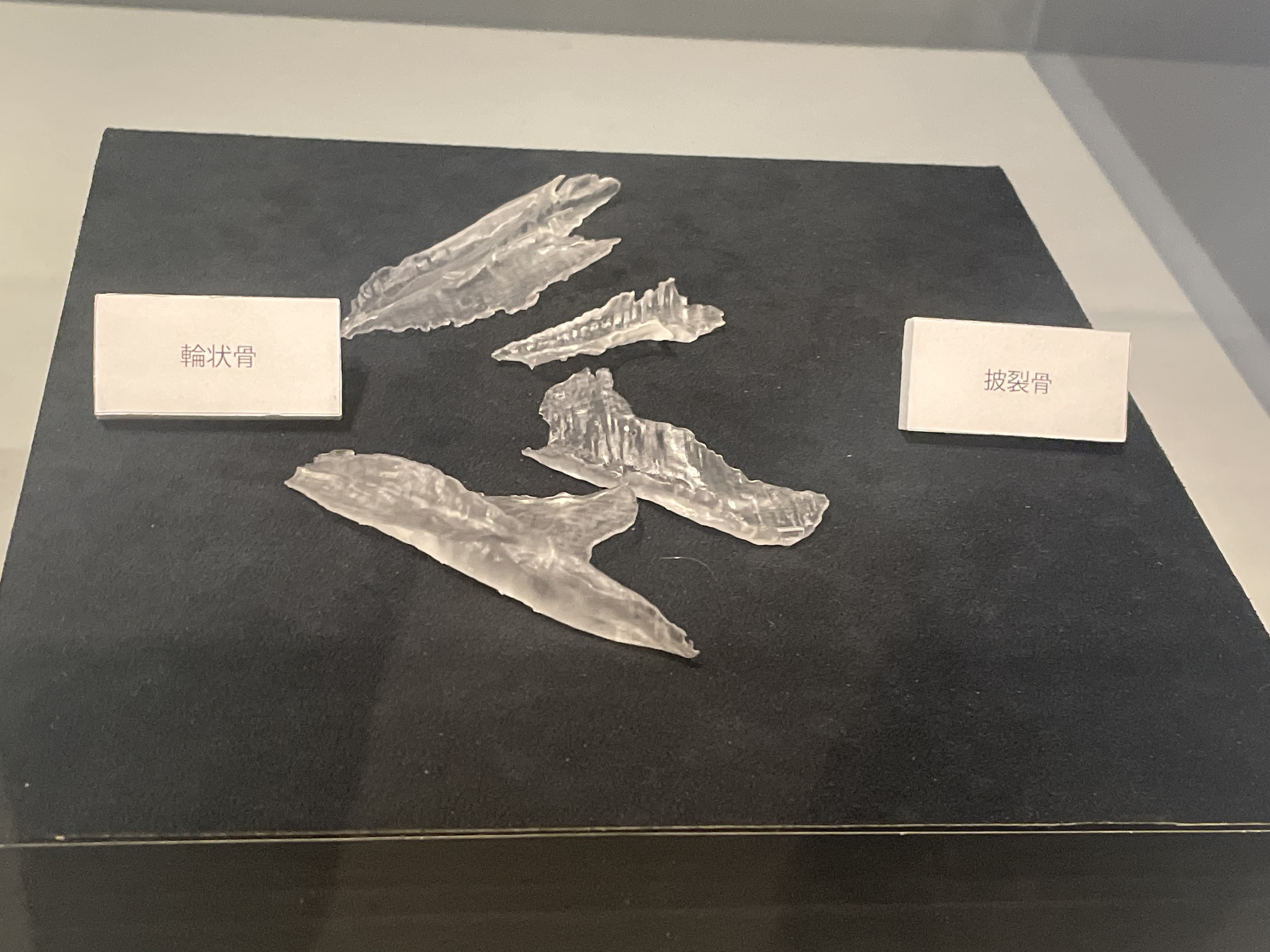
Larynx fossil

A fossilized larynx was described from a specimen of juvenile P. hilwitnorum (IGM 100/3186) by Yoshida et al. 2023. The larynx was composed of cricoid and arytenoid cartilages, similar to those of non-avian reptiles. However its mobile cricoid-arytenoid joint and long arytenoid cartilages would have enabled easy opening of the glottis, thus allowing air-flow control similar to that of birds. Also, the cartilages were ossified, implying that laryngeal ossification is a feature of some non-avian dinosaurs. This structure suggests that Pinacosaurus was likely capable of making loud, possibly bird-like vocalizations and produced them from a non-laryngeal sound organ.

== Paleoenvironment ==
The habitat of Pinacosaurus consisted of a semi-desert interspersed with oases. No large theropods are known to have inhabited the ecosystem, though smaller ones like Velociraptor were present. It has been suggested that the relatively light build of Pinacosaurus was an adaptation to gain agility to better fight small theropods, the moderately large club being fast enough to hit these swift targets.

== See also ==
- Timeline of ankylosaur research
- Djadokhta Formation
- Evgeny Maleev
- Halszka Osmólska
- Teresa Maryańska
