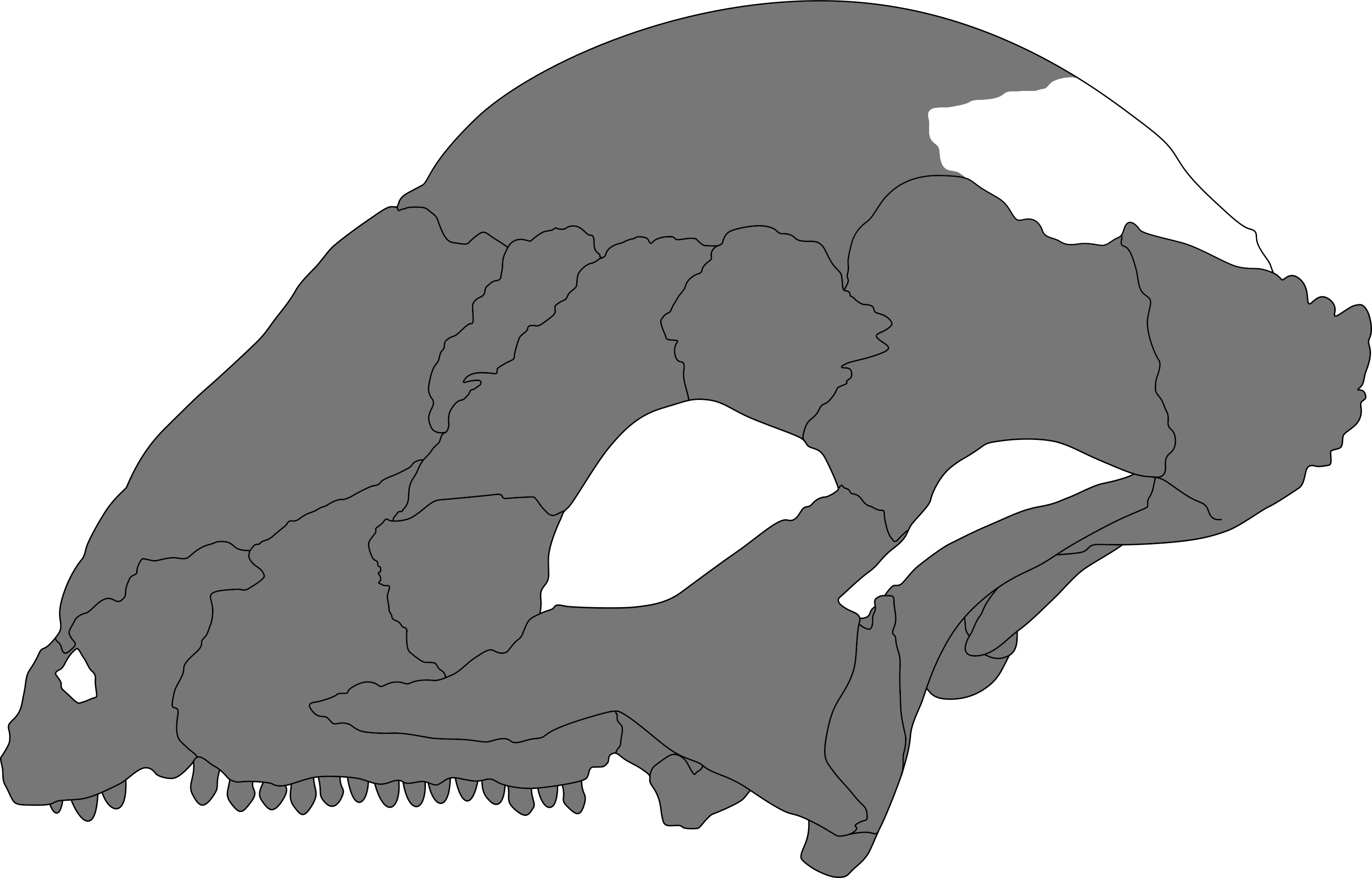
- Skull diagram of Sinocephale with known material in white

Scientific classification
- Kingdom: Animalia
- Phylum: Chordata
- Class: Reptilia
- Clade: Dinosauria
- Clade: †Ornithischia
- Clade: †Pachycephalosauria
- Family: †Pachycephalosauridae
- Subfamily: †Pachycephalosaurinae
- Genus: †Sinocephale; Evans et al., 2021

Type species
- †Troodon bexelli (original combination) Bohlin, 1953

Synonyms
- Stegoceras bexelli (Bohlin, 1953) Kuhn, 1964

= Sinocephale =

Sinocephale Temporal range: Late Cretaceous, ?Santonian–Campanian (younger than ~92 Ma)

Genus of dinosaur

Sinocephale (meaning 'Chinese head') is a genus of pachycephalosaurid dinosaur that lived in what is now Inner Mongolia, China, during the Cretaceous period. The genus contains a single species, Sinocephale bexelli, which was originally named as a species of the genus Troodon in 1953, and later transferred to the genus Stegoceras in 1964. After decades of being considered dubious, it was re-evaluated in 2021 and recognised as a valid taxon, being given its own genus, Sinocephale. The original holotype was lost, with modern research conducted using rediscovered plaster casts.

Scant material makes for limited knowledge of its life appearance, but it is distinguished by an embayment on the back of the domed skull, which would give it a heart shape as seen from above. It is a member of the subfamily Pachycephalosaurinae, related to animals such as Pachycephalosaurus and Prenocephale. The geologic context of the species has historically been unclear, but it is currently thought to originate in rocks belonging to the Ulansuhai Formation.

== Discovery and naming ==
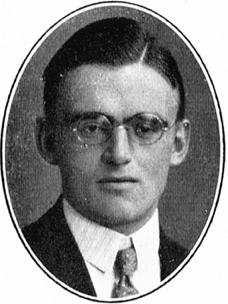
Swedish palaeontologist Birger Bohlin, who first studied Sinocephale

During the early 20th century, Swedish palaeontological expeditions were conducted in China. During one such expedition, sometime in 1930 or 1931, a specimen was discovered that would become recognized as the first evidence of Pachycephalosauria (known as "dome-headed dinosaurs") from Asia. It consisted of a parietal bone (a bone forming the top of the rear skull), largely complete along its midline and right side but missing part of the left. Discovered at the Tsondolien-Khuduk geologic locality in Inner Mongolia, the specimen among others were brought to Sweden for study in Uppsala. The specimen was named and described by palaeontologist Birger Bohlin in 1953, as a new species of the genus Troodon, with the specific name bexelli honouring Gerhard Bexel, who discovered the specimen. The genus Troodon had historically been considered a pachycephalosaur (as it was only known from convergent teeth), although it is now recognized as a theropod. By the time the paper had been published the specimen had already been returned to China's Institute of Vertebrate Paleontology and Paleoanthropology and was subsequently lost along with many other specimens. A decade later, in 1964, Oskar Kuhn reassigned T. bexelli to the genus Stegoceras as the species S. bexelli (as Stegoceras had been split from Troodon to contain the true pachycephalosaur remains).

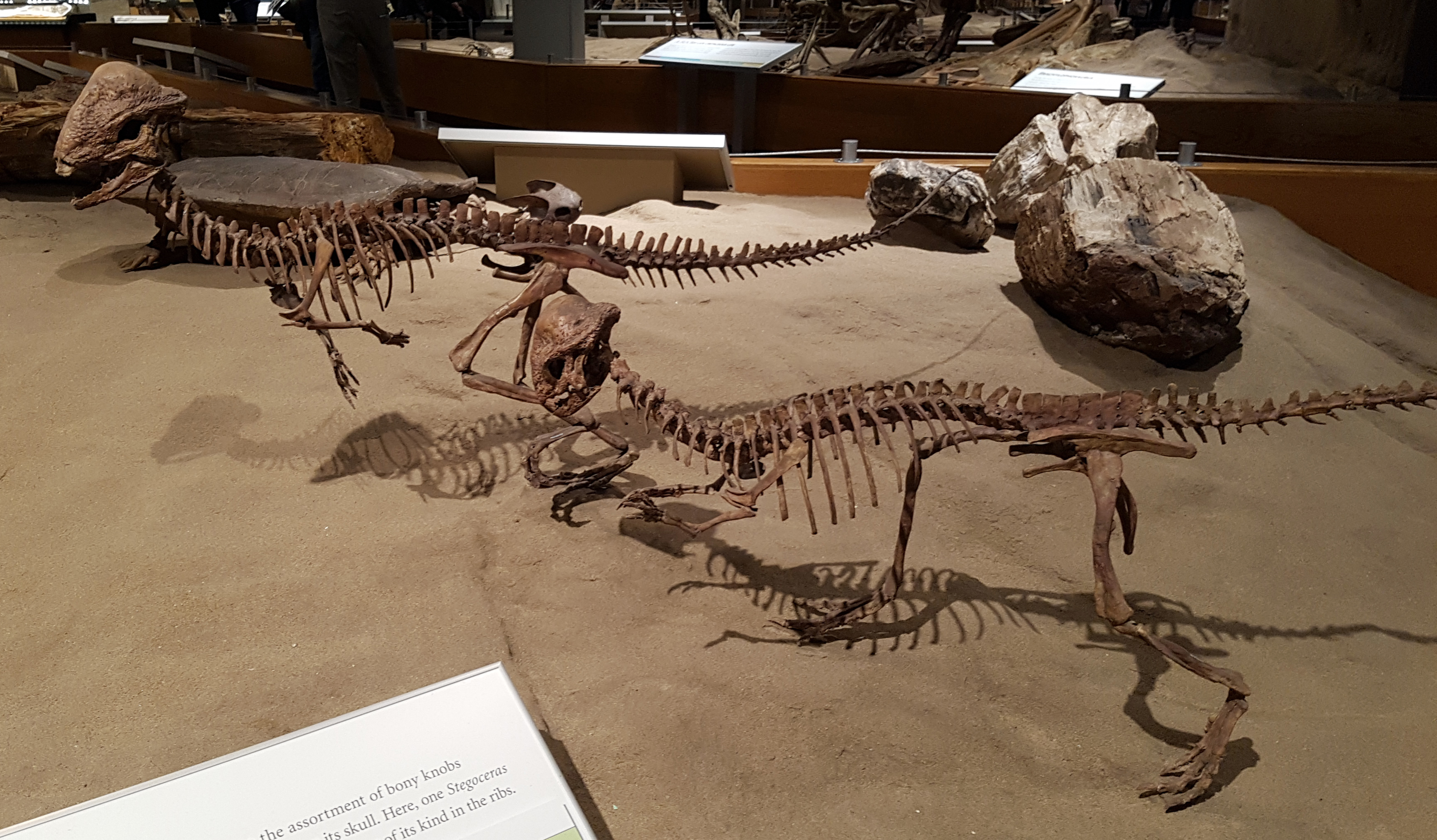
Mounts of Stegoceras, a genus Sinocephale has been associated with for much of its history

Bohlin's species was largely ignored in the years following its original naming, only occasionally invoked to mention its significance as the first known Asian pachycephalosaur. In 1983 Hans-Dieter Sues and Peter Galton commented on the species in a paper focused on North American pachycephalosaurs, noting that based on the data from Bohlin's description the species clearly differs from definite Stegoceras material, casting doubt on its assignment to the genus. They considered the material to clearly be indeterminate and unidentifiable as a valid taxon below the family level. Robert M. Sullivan would agree with this sentiment in 2000s studies, noting it likely belonged to an Asian genus like Prenocephale but that it should be considered an undiagnostic nomen dubium. In her chapter on pachycephalosaurs in the 1990 encyclopedia book The Dinosauria, Teresa Maryańska offered an alternative opinion, noting points of anatomical distinctiveness compared to other pachycephalosaurids despite the scant nature of its material. She noted it would be worthwhile for the material to be re-examined and given its own genus. It is unclear if any of these authors after Bohlin examined the material or a cast firsthand.

Further research became possible with the recognition of two plaster casts of the holotype. One is located at the American Museum of Natural History under the specimen number AMNH 2073, and the other at the Museum of Evolution of Uppsala University under the specimen number PMU 23186, with the former having a tag indicating its origination in Uppsala. These are thought to have been made by Eric Ingemar Ståhl during the original period of study, before the return of the original specimen to China. These were used as plastotypes for the species, meaning they function as stand-ins for the holotype (which was never given a specimen number) due to it being lost; the holotype remains the name-bearing specimen and is not considered replaced. In light of this discovery David Evans and colleagues redescribed the species in 2021; they noted that, based on how the specimen had been discussed in the literature, they were potentially the first people since Bohlin to study the anatomy firsthand instead of merely basing opinions on the 1953 paper. They aimed to provide a more in-depth description than the 1953 study, investigating the ornamentation and age of the animal and evaluating its phylogenetic place in the Pachycephalosauridae in light of the decades of discoveries since its naming. Finding the specimen to be a diagnostic (possessing distinguishing traits relative to other species), distinct species within the family, they gave it a new genus name, Sinocephale. It combines the prefix sino referring to China, where the specimen was found, and the Greek word kephalē (κεφαλή) meaning "head", which is a common suffix for pachycephalosaur names.

== Description ==
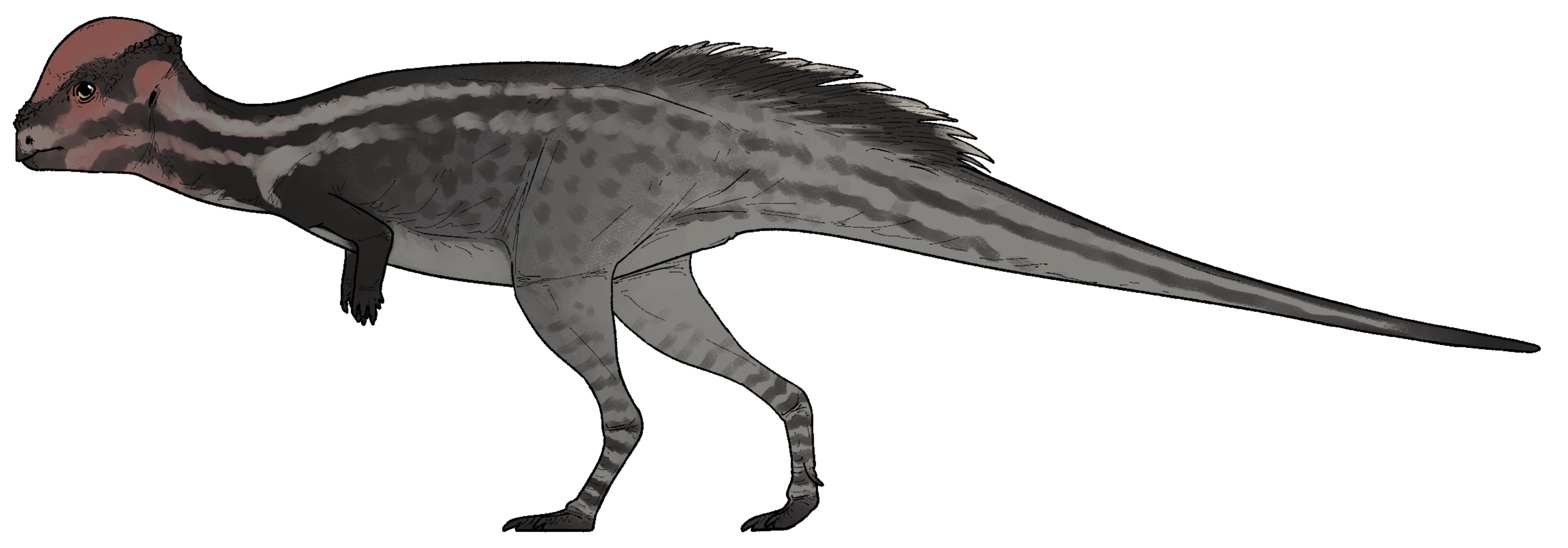
Life reconstruction

Pachycephalosaurs were small bipedal animals bearing thickened skulls with a dome shape on their tops. As members of Marginocephalia, they possessed an overhanging "shelf" on the back of their skulls formed by the parietal and squamosal bones, termed the parietosquamosal shelf. As Sinocephale is only known from a parietal, its only documented anatomy is the rear skull. Its primary distinguishing trait is the deeply embayed middle section of this shelf formed by the parietal. Thus, the skull would have had a roughly heart-shaped profile when seen from above. The parietal formed a significant portion of the shelf, clearly separating the left and right squamosals. This is similar to Foraminacephale and some species of Sphaerotholus, but unlike some other pachycephalosaurs such as Stegoceras or Prenocephale where the parietal is mostly enclosed by the squamosals. Whereas the shelves of many other pachycephalosaurs are generally covered with ornamental knobs of bone, that of Sinocephale lacks these and the bone merely possesses very small, randomly spaced rugosities. More prominently, a small ridge is present near the back of the parietal, similar to Acrotholus and some specimens of Stegoceras but not present in other pachycephalosaurs.

Though only partially preserved, the maximum thickness of the dome is estimated to have been around 7.5 centimetres (3.0 in). Like in other pachycephalosaurs, this dome would have been formed by the unpreserved frontal bones (placed over the eyes) in addition to the parietals. The complete parietal has a roughly triangular shape, wide in the front and narrowing to a smaller width in the centre of the parietosquamosal shelf in the back. Its front edge, which would have articulated with the frontals, has a bone texture with distinct vertical ridges. Further back on the dome, the supratemporal fenestrae (holes on top of the skull) were entirely closed, similar to other advanced pachycephalosaurs, covered with 2.1 centimetres (0.83 in) of bone. The closure of these holes left hollow temporal chambers enclosed in the skull, and in Sinocephale these were large and their roofs were high-arched. This is similar to the condition of Sphaerotholus and Pachycephalosaurus, but unlike the restricted temporal chambers found in Stegoceras and Foraminacephale. The dome appears to have extended nearly to the back of the skull, leaving no undomed surface on the parietosquamosal shelf, though this is known to vary during growth in other pachycephalosaurs. The parietosquamosal shelf appears intermediate between the flat shape seen in basal (early-diverging) taxa like Stegoceras and the smooth, downturned shape seen in more advanced genera such as Foraminacephale and Sphaerotholus; this intermediate condition is shared with Acrotholus.

== Classification ==
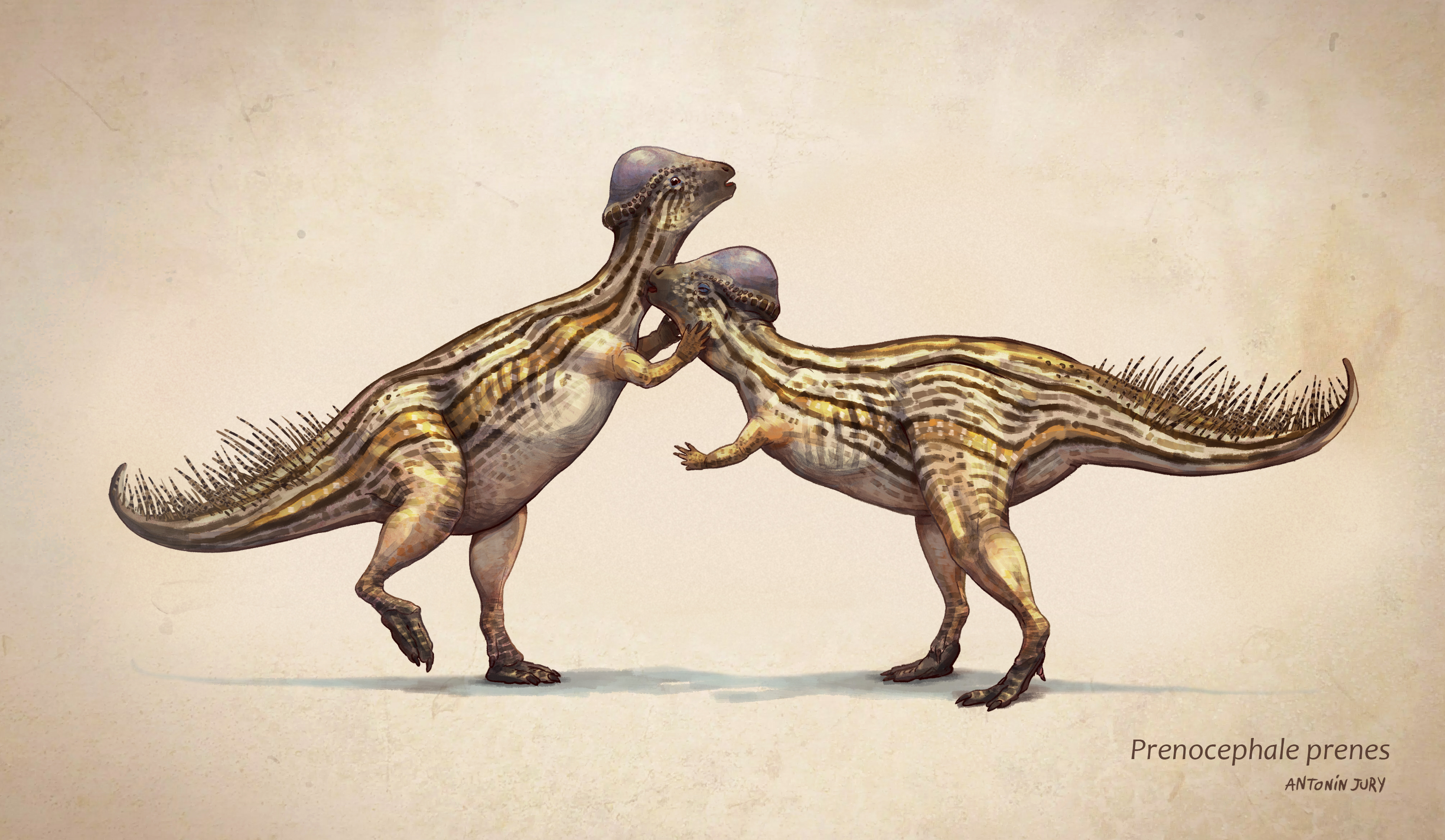
Life restoration of the closely related Prenocephale

The taxon has been recognized as a member of the Pachycephalosauridae ever since its initial description in 1953, when the group was still known as Troodontidae. The 2021 redescription was the first time Sinocephale was tested in a phylogenetic analysis; this analysis was modified from that of Woodruff et al. (2021), which itself is derived from that of Evans et al. (2013), prior studies focusing on pachycephalosaur taxonomy. The known material of S. bexelli was able to be coded for 18% of the anatomical traits considered by the analysis. The species was found to belong to the Pachycephalosaurinae. This makes it quite distantly related to Stegoceras, despite its association with the genus historically, instead being related to animals like Prenocephale. It was cautioned, however, that the support for its phylogenetic position was not robust, and so subject to change. The phylogenetic tree of Evans et al. (2021) is reproduced below:

- - Psittacosaurus mongoliensis
  - - Yinlong downsi
    - Pachycephalosauria
      - Wannanosaurus yansiensis
      - Pachycephalosauridae
        - - Stegoceras novomexicanum
          - Stegoceras validum
          - Colepiocephale lambei
          - Hanssuesia sternbergi
        - Pachycephalosaurinae
          - Goyocephale lattimorei
          - - Homalocephale calathocercos
            - - Tylocephale gilmorei
              - - Foraminacephale brevis
                - - - Amtocephale gobiensis
                    - - Acrotholus audeti
                      - Prenocephale prenes
                      - - Sinocephale bexelli
                        - - Sphaerotholus goodwini
                          - - Sphaerotholus buchholtzae
                            - Sphaerotholus edmontonensis
                        - - Alaskacephale gangloffi
                          - Pachycephalosaurus wyomingensis
                          - Stygimoloch spinifer

In the 2025 study by Tsogtbaatar Chinzorig and colleagues describing Zavacephale, some analyses found a similar result with Sinocephale closely related to taxa such as Sphaerotholus and Pachycephalosaurus. All of the implied weighting analyses, in contrast, found it to be the sister taxon of Pachycephalosauridae. They noted that its status as the second oldest pachycephalosaur could make this logical, and that the significant exposure of the parietal bone on the back of the skull was similar to basal taxa such as Zavacephale and Wannanosaurus and possibly transitional with respect to later species where the back of the skull was mostly formed by the squamosals.

== Palaeoecology ==
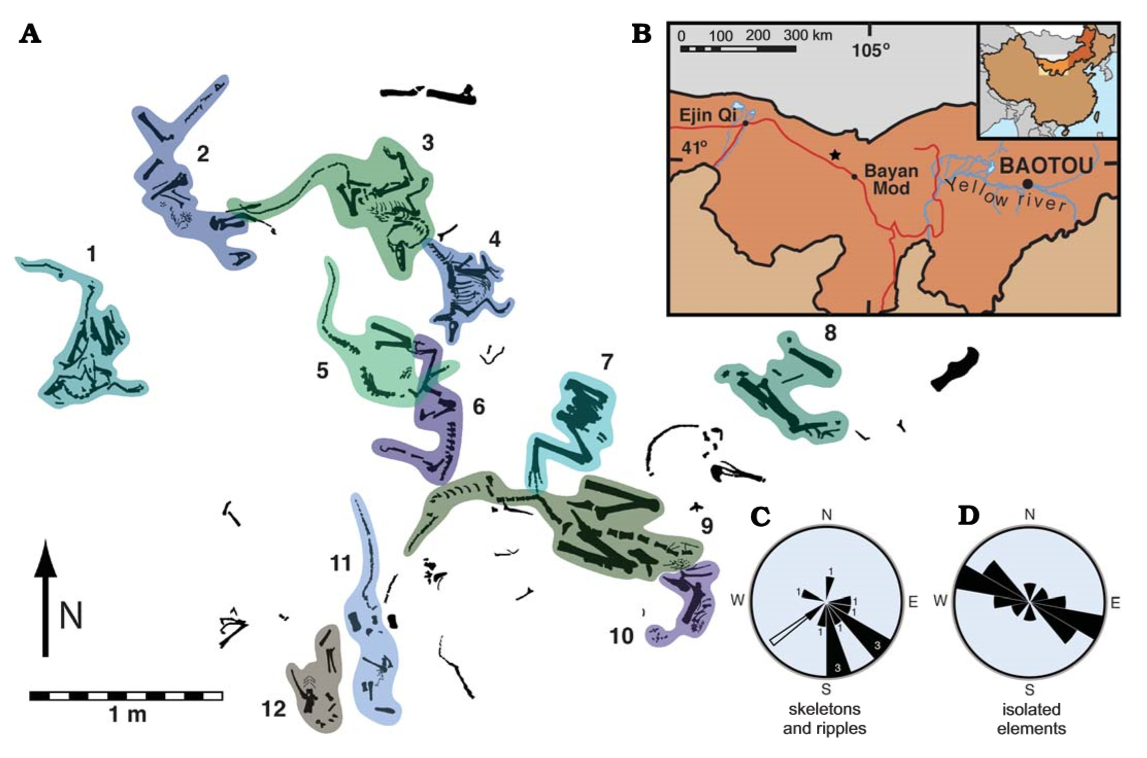
Quarry map and location of Sinornithomimus remains from another site in the Ulansuhai Formation nearby the Sinocephale locality

Historically, there has been confusion as to where the only known specimen Sinocephale was found, confounding assessments of its geologic age and context. Bohlin thought that the species "is at least not older than the North American forms", referring to taxa such as Stegoceras, though noted the unit was likely not deposited at the exact same time. In 1974, Maryańska and Halszka Osmólska tentatively favoured the idea that its locality was equivalent in age to the Djadochta Formation, which they considered Coniacian or Santonian in age (both part of the Late Cretaceous. The Djadochta Formation is now considered more recent than it was at the time, dating to the mid Campanian age. Sues and Galton considered the stratigraphic placement of the Tsondolien-Khuduk locality uncertain, but noted it may be older than Djadochta rather than equivalent. They stated it was located in the Gansu region of China. In the first edition of The Dinosauria, David Weishampel ascribed the rocks to the Minhe Formation, which was followed by some subsequent authors. The redescription noted both of these were in error; the specimen is from Nei Mongol (Inner Mongolia), not Gansu, and so cannot be from Minhe. Through interpretation of the 1953 paper, map analysis, and firsthand understanding of the area by You Hailu (one of the four authors of the paper), they concluded that Sinocephale hails from the Ulansuhai Formation.

The age of the Ulansuhai Formation is not constrained with confidence, though it is definitely younger than 92 million years ago (Turonian age); Evans et al. (2021) suggested that the formation is likely dated to the Santonian-Campanian ages or older. Other dinosaurs from the formation include the ornithomimosaur Sinornithomimus and the large carnivorous theropod Chilantaisaurus. The formation is dominated by red mudstone and siltstone, indicating a floodplain environment defined by meandering rivers. However, some geologic features such as calcrete indicate drier components of the ecosystem. The formation was deposited during a period of transition for the Gobi from wet, fluvial ecosystems towards the desertic dune-dominated ecosystems of later Cretaceous deposits.
