= Minhe =

Minhe (民和) may refer to the following locations in China:

- Minhe Hui and Tu Autonomous County, Qinghai
- Minhe Formation, geological formation
- Minhe, Jiangxi, town in Jinxian County
- Minhe Township, Bin County, Heilongjiang
