= Heishansaurus =

Heishansaurus Temporal range: Late Cretaceous, ~85–72 Ma

Scientific classification
- Domain: Eukaryota
- Kingdom: Animalia
- Phylum: Chordata
- Clade: Dinosauria
- Clade: †Ornithischia
- Clade: †Thyreophora
- Clade: †Ankylosauria
- Family: †Ankylosauridae
- Genus: †Heishansaurus; Bohlin, 1953
- Species: †H. pachycephalus

Binomial name
- †Heishansaurus pachycephalus Bohlin, 1953

Extinct genus of reptiles

Heishansaurus, meaning "Heishan lizard" after the area in China where it was discovered, is the name given to a dubious genus of herbivorous ornithischian dinosaur, probably belonging to the Ankylosauridae.

In 1930, Swedish palaeontologist Anders Birger Bohlin discovered dinosaur fossils, in the context of the Swedish-Chinese expeditions headed by Sven Hedin, near Jiayuguan ("Chia-Yu-Kuan"), in the west of Gansu Province.

In 1953, Bohlin named these as the type species Heishansaurus pachycephalus. The generic name refers to the Heishan, the "Black Mountains". The specific name pachycephalus, meaning "thick-headed", was inspired by Bohlin's identification of the taxon as a pachycephalosaur. Today this dinosaur is more probably considered an ankylosaur. The fossils, from the Minhe Formation dating from the Late Cretaceous (Campanian or Maastrichtian stage), were fragmentary. The type is the only known specimen. The material consisted of poorly preserved cranial and postcranial fragments plus some dermal scutes. It contained skull fragments including a maxilla, teeth, vertebrae from the neck, back and tail, osteoderms and spikes. Today, the specimen is lost. Of one dorsal vertebra a cast remains, preserved in the American Museum of Natural History with the inventory number AMNH 2062.

Bohlin considered the species to be a member of the pachycephalosaurians because he mistook an osteoderm for the thick skull roof typical of this group. The material is probably ankylosaurid. It has been seen as a junior synonym of Pinacosaurus but the genus is more generally considered a nomen dubium, especially since Bohlin's description can only be checked by comparison with his published drawings.
