= Stegosaurides =

Stegosaurides Temporal range: Early Cretaceous, 130–112 Ma

Scientific classification
- Kingdom: Animalia
- Phylum: Chordata
- Class: Reptilia
- Clade: Dinosauria
- Clade: †Ornithischia
- Clade: †Genasauria
- Clade: †Thyreophora
- Genus: †Stegosaurides; Bohlin, 1953
- Species: †S. excavatus

Binomial name
- †Stegosaurides excavatus Bohlin, 1953

Synonyms
- Stegosauroides Colbert, 1961 (sic)

Extinct genus of dinosaurs

Stegosaurides (meaning "Stegosaurus-shaped") is a genus of herbivorous thyreophoran (perhaps ankylosaurid or possibly stegosaurian) dinosaur. It lived during the Cretaceous. Its fossils were found in the Xinminbao Group near Heishan in Gansu Province in China. These fossils consist of fragmentary material, including dermal spine elements. The genus is occasionally misspelled as "Stegosauroides".

== Discovery and species ==
In 1930, Anders Birger Bohlin during the Swedish-Chinese expedition of Sven Hedin excavated fossils at Hui-Hui-Pu, between the Heishan en Ku’an-t’ai-shan mountain ranges, near Xinminbao, in the west of Gansu. These included two vertebrae of about eleven centimetres in length and a dermal spine base.

The type species is Stegosaurides excavatus, formally described by Bohlin in 1953. The generic name combines Stegosaurus with the Greek ~eides, "-shaped", in reference to the presumed similarity with the vertebrae of Stegosaurus. The specific name means "hollowed out" in Latin and refers to two large depressions, one each on either side of the spine base. It is currently considered a nomen dubium as the material is so limited.

== Phylogeny ==
Bohlin placed Stegosaurides in the Stegosauria. However, later authors often presumed it represented a member of the Ankylosauria, in an indeterminate position. The fossils resemble vertebrae of both groups in having strongly elevated diapophyses, but are more ankylosaur-like in that the neural arch is moderately tall. Uncertainty over the precise age of the Xinminbao Group adds to the difficulty of determining the affinities. Usually it is given as Early Cretaceous when both stegosaurs and ankylosaurs were present, but sometimes as Late Cretaceous when stegosaurs were probably extinct.

== See also ==
- Timeline of ankylosaur research
