= Chiayusaurus =

Chiayusaurus Temporal range: Early Cretaceous, Barremian–Aptian

Scientific classification
- Kingdom: Animalia
- Phylum: Chordata
- Class: Reptilia
- Clade: Dinosauria
- Clade: Saurischia
- Clade: †Sauropodomorpha
- Clade: †Sauropoda
- Clade: †Macronaria
- Family: †Euhelopodidae
- Genus: †Chiayusaurus; Bohlin, 1953
- Species: †C. lacustris

Binomial name
- †Chiayusaurus lacustris Bohlin, 1953

Possible species
- Chiayusaurus asianensis? Lee, Yang & Park, 1997

Synonyms
- Chiayüsaurus Bohlin, 1953; Chiayuesaurus Bohlin, 1953

Extinct genus of dinosaurs

Chiayusaurus (meaning "Chia-yu-kuan lizard", after where it was found) is a genus of sauropod dinosaur known from teeth found in China and possibly also South Korea. Two species have been named for this obscure genus, though only the type, C. lacustris, is still seen as valid. It was originally named as Chiayüsaurus, but the ICZN does not permit special characters, so the name was corrected to Chiayusaurus. The obsolete name can still be seen in older sources, though. As a sauropod, Chiayusaurus would have been a large, quadrupedal herbivore.

== History and taxonomy ==
Birger Bohlin based Chiayusaurus on a tooth crown in the IVPP. This tooth was found in the Barremian (Early Cretaceous) Xinminbao Group of Gansu, China. This spatulate tooth crown was 27 millimeters (1.1 inches) long, and was not similar to the younger genus Asiatosaurus. As it was based on such sparse material, it has largely been ignored or considered to be indistinguishable from other, better-known sauropods. For example, Russell and Zheng found its tooth to be indistinguishable from those of Mamenchisaurus.

Bohlin described a larger tooth in the 1953 publication as "Species A. (aff. Chiayüsaurus)", which he thought might belong to the type species. In 1997, Lee, Yang, and Park described a new species from South Korea based on a tooth (KPE 8001) which they regarded as being identical to "Species A. (aff. Chiayüsaurus)". This new species, C. asianensis, is from the Aptian-Albian Hasandong Formation of Jinju, South Korea. The authors rejected the suggestion that Bohlin's two teeth may have differed from being in different places in the jaw, and separated their species on the basis of details of the wear surfaces and placement of ridges. The C. asianensis tooth crown is 46 mm (1.8 in) long.

Both species were reviewed in 2002 by Barrett et al. They regarded the type tooth of C. lacustris as nearly identical to teeth of Euhelopus but were unable to conclusively establish synonymy, finding it to be an indeterminate eusauropod. They found that C. lacustris and C. asianensis shared no special features, and instead differed. C. asianensis was regarded as a possible titanosauriform, but still indeterminate. In the most recent review of sauropods, both species were considered to be dubious without comment.
