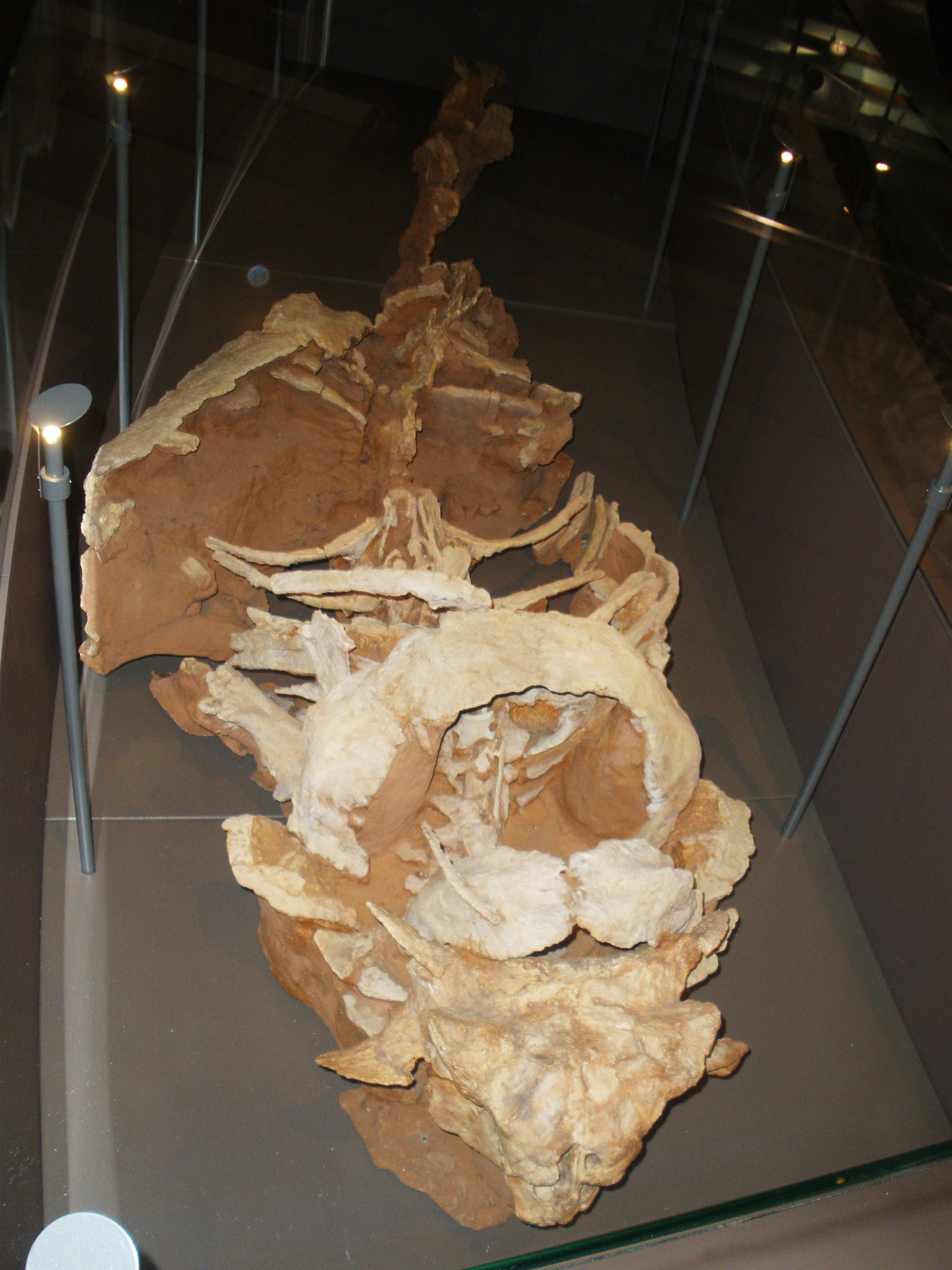
- Holotype

Scientific classification
- Kingdom: Animalia
- Phylum: Chordata
- Class: Reptilia
- Clade: Dinosauria
- Clade: †Ornithischia
- Clade: †Thyreophora
- Clade: †Ankylosauria
- Family: †Ankylosauridae
- Subfamily: †Ankylosaurinae
- Genus: †Eopinacosaurus; Penkalski, 2026

Type species
- †Pinacosaurus mephistocephalus Godefroit et al. 1999

Synonyms
- Pinacosaurus mephistocephalus Godefroit et al. 1999

= Eopinacosaurus =

Eopinacosaurus Temporal range: Cretaceous, 75–71 Ma

Genus of ankylosaurid dinosaur

Eopinacosaurus (meaning "dawn Pinacosaurus") is an extinct genus of ankylosaurid armored dinosaur known from the Late Cretaceous (Campanian age) Bayan Mandahu Formation of China and Djadokhta Formation of Mongolia. The genus contains a single species, Eopinacosaurus mephistocephalus, which was originally assigned to the coeval genus Pinacosaurus.

== Discovery and taxonomy ==
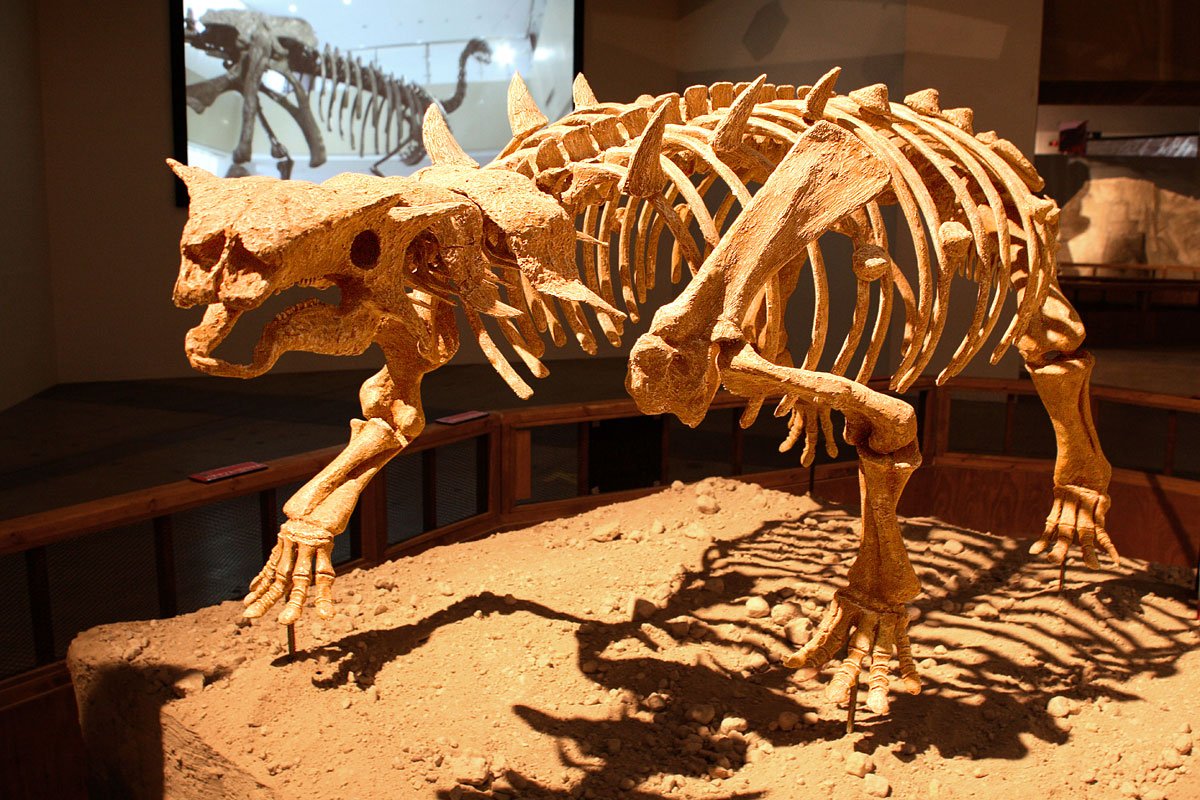
Mounted skeleton cast

In 1996, a Belgian-Chinese expedition discovered a large, articulated skeleton in the Bayan Mandahu Formation of China. In 1999, Pascal Godefroit and colleagues named this specimen, accessioned as IMM 96BM3/1, as a new species of the genus Pinacosaurus, P. mephistocephalus. The specific name is a contraction of Mephistopheles and the Greek κεφαλή, kephalè, "head", in reference to the "devilish" squamosal horns. In 2010, Gregory S. Paul suggested that P. mephistocephalus were a junior synonym of P. grangeri. It was considered a valid species by Robert Hill in 2012, based on the "secondary dermal" (squamosal) horns and narial characteristics. Victoria Arbour and Michael Burns have confirmed that the species was valid.

In 2026, Paul Penkalski transferred P. mephistocephalus to a new genus, Eopinacosaurus.

== Classification ==
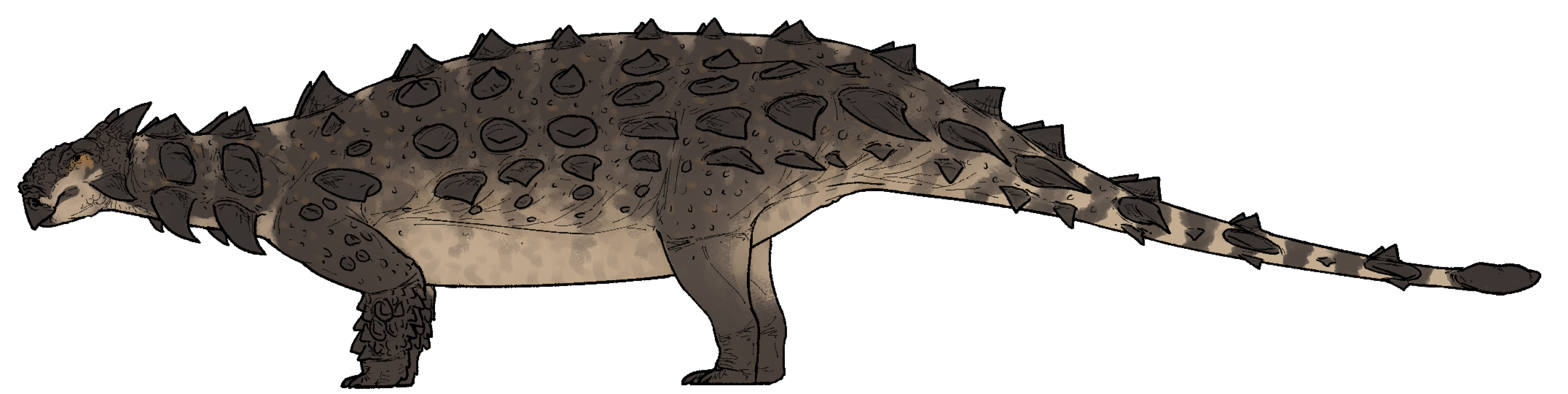
Artist's interpretation

Eopinacosaurus is regarded as a member of the ankylosaurid subfamily Ankylosaurinae, although phylogenetic analyses including it (as "Pinacosaurus" mephistocephalus) since its description have recovered it in a variable position within the clade and in relation to the Pinacosaurus type species, P. grangeri. In 2023, Raven and colleagues recovered it diverging immediately before P. grangeri. These results are displayed in the cladogram below, though later expansions and modifications of this matrix recovered both Pinacosaurus species as sister taxa.

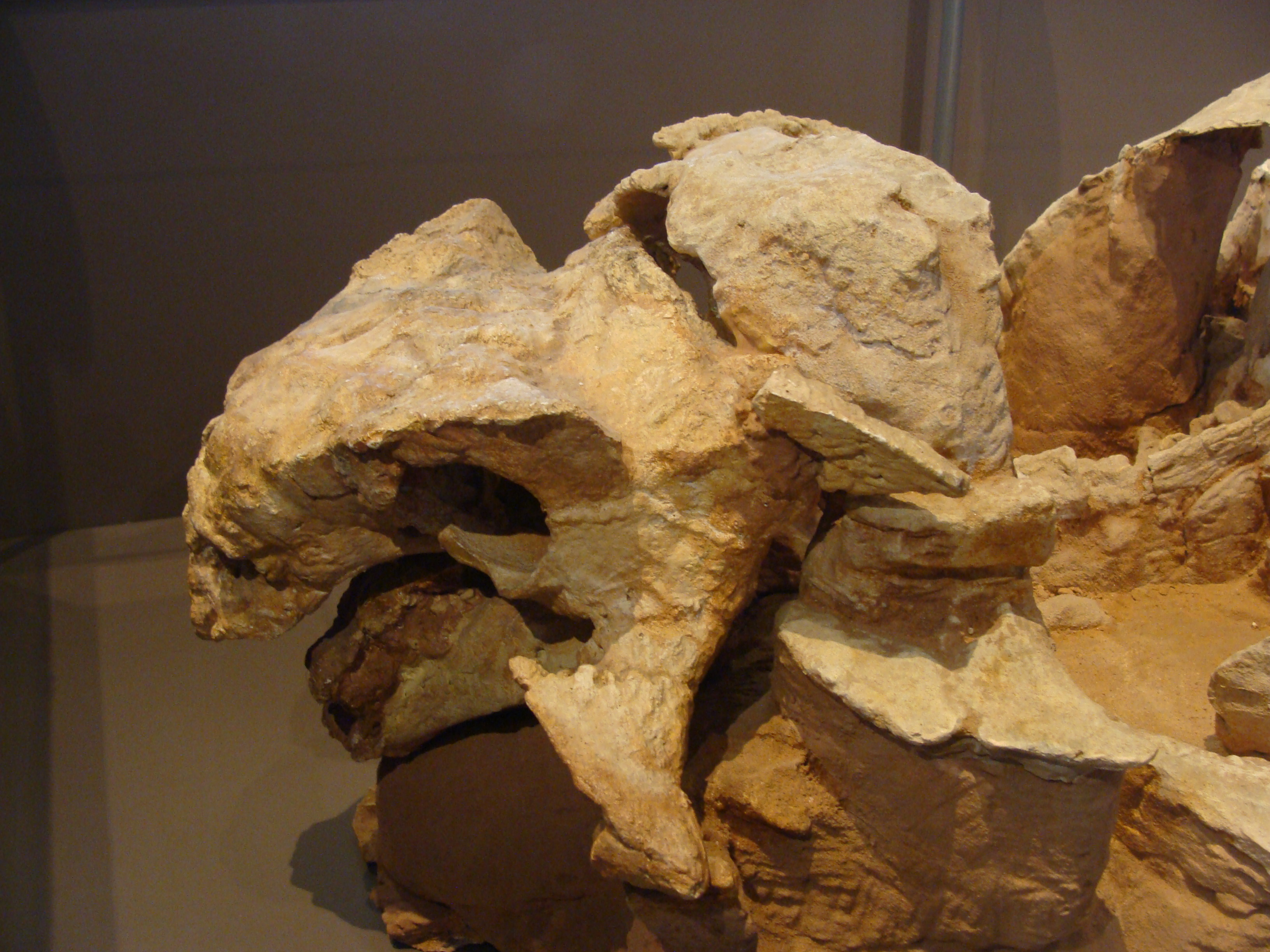
Holotype skull, highlighting the characteristic 'cheek horn'

- Ankylosaurinae
  - Jinyunpelta
  - - - Tsagantegia
      - - Nodocephalosaurus
        - Zaraapelta
    - - Akainacephalus
      - - Pinacosaurus mephistocephalus
        - - Pinacosaurus grangeri
          - - - Crichtonpelta
              - Ziapelta
            - - - Ankylosaurus
                - - Anodontosaurus
                  - - Tarchia kielanae
                    - - Saichania
                      - - Minotaurasaurus
                        - Tarchia teresae
              - - Antarctopelta
                - - Zuul
                  - - Euoplocephalus
                    - - Dyoplosaurus
                      - Scolosaurus

In his 2026 revision of the genus Pinacosaurus, Penkalski performed a specimen-level analysis of fossils regarded as belonging to the genus in addition to putative close Asian relatives. These results are displayed in the cladogram below:

- - Saichania
  - Tarchia
    ⊞
    - Tarchia tumanovae
    - - Tarchia kielanae
      - Tarchia teresae
    ⊟
  - - Zaraapelta
    - - Eopinacosaurus mephistocephalus
        - IMM 96BM3/1
        - MPC-D 100/1337a
      - - Minotaurasaurus ramachandrani
          - INBR 21004
          - ΜΑΕ 98-179
        - Pinacosaurus
          - P. hilwitnorum
            - IGM 100/1014
            - IGM 100/3186
          - - P. grangeri (AMNH 6523)
            - IVPP V16283, V16346 and V16854
            - - ZPAL MgD-II/1
              - IVPP V16853
