= Peishansaurus =

Peishansaurus Temporal range: Late Cretaceous, 85–72 Ma

Scientific classification
- Domain: Eukaryota
- Kingdom: Animalia
- Phylum: Chordata
- Clade: Dinosauria
- Clade: †Ornithischia
- Genus: †Peishansaurus; Bohlin, 1953
- Species: †P. philemys

Binomial name
- †Peishansaurus philemys Bohlin, 1953

Extinct genus of dinosaurs

Peishansaurus (/ˌbeɪˌʃɑːnˈsɔːrəs/) was a genus of ornithischian dinosaur that lived during the Late Cretaceous period (late Santonian-Campanian stages), roughly 85-72 million years ago.

Peishansaurus was named and described by the Swedish paleontologist Anders Birger Bohlin in 1953. The type species is Peishansaurus philemys. Peishansaurus is named after Beishan, the "Northern Mountains" in Gansu. The specific name philemys means "lover of turtles" from the Greek φιλέω, phileo, "to love", and ἐμύς, emys, "water turtle" in reference to the fact that at the site also the turtle Peishanemys latipons was found, a member of the Dermatemydidae.

In 1930 Bohlin, in the context of the Swedish-Chinese expeditions of Sven Hedin, had uncovered the fossils at Ehr-chia-wu-t'ung, in the west of Gansu, in a layer of the Minhe Formation dating from the Campanian. They consist of an about 2-inch (5-centimetre) long piece of a right lower jaw with four tooth positions and a loose tooth. The holotype was reported lost as of 2014.

Peishansaurus is today considered a nomen dubium, doubtful genus. Bohlin placed it in the Ankylosauridae, assuming the fossil represented a juvenile ankylosaurid, but it could also be a pachycephalosaur. In 1999, Kenneth Carpenter considered the tooth to be similar to that of Psittacosaurus. In 2004, Vickaryous et al. treated Peishansaurus as Ankylosauria incertae sedis, and in 2016, it was treated as ?Thyreophora incertae sedis by Arbour and Currie.
