= Xinminbao Group =

Geological group in China and Mongolia

Xīnmínbǎo Group 新民堡群
- Stratigraphic range: Late Barremian-Aptian
- Type: Geological group
- Sub-units: Chijinbao Formation, Digou Formation, Xiagou Formation, Zhonggou Formation

Lithology
- Primary: Conglomerate, siltstone, mudstone
- Other: Sandstone

Location
- Region: East Asia
- Country: China, Mongolia

The Xīnmínbǎo Group (Chinese: 新民堡群; pinyin: Xīnmínbǎo qún) is a group of geological formations in north central China. They occur across a large depression between the Altai Mountains of Mongolia to the north and the Qilian mountains of the Qinghai Plateau to the south, in the Gōngpóquán (公婆泉) and Suànjǐngzi (算井子) basins, and also in the neighbouring Jiuquan Basin.

Both of these areas are inland basins consisting of fluvial (river), lacustrine (lake), and intermontane (between mountains) alluvial fan (floodplain) sediments that were deposited during the Early Cretaceous, probably during the Aptian or possibly late Barremian stage, when the climate was semi-arid and subtropical.

The group has been visited by many expeditions including the Silk Road dinosaur expedition of 1992 which concentrated on the area around Mazong Shan.

== Geology ==
The group is made up of three main formations.

=== Chijinbao Formation ===
This consists of a lower red unit of coarse conglomerates grading to fine sandstones representing river channel to alluvial fan deposits, and an upper unit of red clastic sediments from either overbank deposits in a meandering fluvial environment, or accumulation in a shallow lacustrine or paludal (marsh) environment.

=== Digou Formation ===
This consists of grey siltstones and calcareous mudstones comprising two sequences of fluvio-lacustrine sedimentation with some alluvial fan and littoral (lake-shore) deposits.

=== Zhonggou Formation ===
This consists of red siltstones and mudstones in a series of upwardly coarsening cycles of lacustrine sediments.

== Vertebrate fauna ==
The dinosaurs of the Xinminbao Group are collectively referred to as the Mazongshan Dinosaur Fauna, representing a unique dinosaur assemblage from all other known dinosaur faunas.

=== Ceratopsians ===
Ceratopsians reported from the Xinminbao Group
Genus	Species	Location	Stratigraphic position	Material	Notes	Images
Archaeoceratops	Archaeoceratops oshimai			"[Two] individuals lacking forelimbs."		Archaeoceratops Auroraceratops
Auroraceratops	Auroraceratops rugosus					Archaeoceratops Auroraceratops
Microceratus	Microceratus gobiensis					Archaeoceratops Auroraceratops
Microceratus	Microceratus sulcidens					Archaeoceratops Auroraceratops
Psittacosaurus	Psittacosaurus mazongshanensis			"One individual lacking caudal and hindlimb."		Archaeoceratops Auroraceratops

=== Ornithopods ===
Color key: Taxon / Reclassified taxon / Taxon falsely reported as present / Dubious taxon or junior synonym / Ichnotaxon / Ootaxon / Morphotaxon	Notes; Uncertain or tentative taxa are in small text; ~~crossed out~~ taxa are discredited.

Ornithopods reported from the Xinminbao Group
Genus	Species	Location	Stratigraphic position	Material	Notes	Images
Equijubus	Equijubus normani			"Skull and partial postcranial skeleton."	(both this and Probactrosaurus are properly hadrosauroids rather than hadrosaurids)	
Gongpoquansaurus	Gongpoquansaurus mazongshanensis			"Partial skull and postcranial skeleton."		
Siluosaurus	Siluosaurus zhangqiani			"Teeth."	Nomen dubium, tentatively classified as a Hypsilophodontid.	

=== Saurischians ===
Saurischians reported from the Xinminbao Group
Genus	Species	Location	Stratigraphic position	Material	Notes	Images
Asiatosaurus	Asiatosaurus mongoliensis					Beishanlong Sinornithoides
Beishanlong	Beishanlong grandis				A deinocheirid ornithomimosaur.	Beishanlong Sinornithoides
Chiayusaurus	C. lacustris					Beishanlong Sinornithoides
Gobititan	Gobititan shenzhouensis					Beishanlong Sinornithoides
"Nanshiungosaurus"	"Nanshiungosaurus bohlini"			"[Sixteen] cervical and dorsal vertebrae."	This species does not belong to Nanshiungosaurus.	Beishanlong Sinornithoides
Sinornithoides	Indeterminate					Beishanlong Sinornithoides

=== Thyreophorans ===
Indeterminate ankylosaur remains are known from the group.

Color key: Taxon / Reclassified taxon / Taxon falsely reported as present / Dubious taxon or junior synonym / Ichnotaxon / Ootaxon / Morphotaxon	Notes; Uncertain or tentative taxa are in small text; ~~crossed out~~ taxa are discredited.

Thyreophorans of the Xinminbao Group
Genus	Species	Location	Stratigraphic position	Abundance	Notes
Stegosaurides	Stegosaurides excavatus				(nomen dubium)

=== Crocodilians ===
Indeterminate crocodilian remains are known from the group.

Crocodilians reported from the Xinminbao Group
Genus	Species	Location	Stratigraphic position	Material	Notes	Images
Chiayusuchus	Chiayusuchus cingulatus					

=== Fish ===
Ray-finned fishes reported from the Xinminbao Group
Genus	Species	Location	Stratigraphic position	Material	Notes	Images
Xixiaichthys	Xixiaichthys tongxinensis					

=== Pterosaurs ===
Pterosaurs reported from the Xinminbao Group
Genus	Species	Location	Stratigraphic position	Material	Notes	Images
Noripterus	Indeterminate					Noripterus

=== Turtles ===
Turtles of the Xinminbao Group
Genus	Species	Location	Stratigraphic position	Abundance	Notes
Tsaotanemys	Tsaotanemys rugosus				

== See also ==
- List of dinosaur-bearing rock formations
