= Minhe Formation =

Geological formation in northwestern China

- Stratigraphic range: Late Cretaceous, Campanian–Maastrichtian
- Type: Geological formation
- Overlies: Unconformity: Hekou Group

Lithology
- Primary: Red or variegated clastic rock

Location
- Region: Gansu, Inner Mongolia
- Country: China

The Minhe Formation (simplified Chinese: 民和组; traditional Chinese: 民和組; pinyin: Mínhé Zǔ) is a geological formation in northwestern China, whose strata date back to the Late Cretaceous period.

Dinosaur remains are among the fossils that have been recovered from the formation.

== Vertebrate paleofauna ==
=== Dinosaurs ===
A tyrannosaur tooth with a split carina has been recovered from the Minhe Formation in China.

Color key: Taxon / Reclassified taxon / Taxon falsely reported as present / Dubious taxon or junior synonym / Ichnotaxon / Ootaxon / Morphotaxon	Notes; Uncertain or tentative taxa are in small text; ~~crossed out~~ taxa are discredited.

Dinosaurs reported from the Minhe Formation
Genus	Species	Location	Stratigraphic position	Material	Notes	Images
Heishansaurus	H. pachycephalus	Gansu		"Badly preserved cranial and postcranial fragments."		Protoceratops Velociraptor
Microceratus	M. gobiensis	Gansu		"Teeth, fragmentary jaws and postcrania."		Protoceratops Velociraptor
Microceratus	M. sulcidens	Gansu		"Tooth."		Protoceratops Velociraptor
Peishansaurus	P. philemys	Gansu		"Very fragmentary jaw with [one] tooth."		Protoceratops Velociraptor
Protoceratops	P. andrewsi	Gansu; Inner Mongolia				Protoceratops Velociraptor
Troodon	T. bexelli	Inner Mongolia			Reclassified as a new genus of pachycephalosaur,Sinocephale and reidentified as provenant from the Ulansuhai Formation	Protoceratops Velociraptor
Velociraptor	V. mongoliensis	Inner Mongolia				Protoceratops Velociraptor

== See also ==
- List of dinosaur-bearing rock formations
