= Ulansuhai Formation =

Geological formation in Inner Mongolia, China

- Stratigraphic range: Late Cretaceous, ?Santonian–Campanian (younger than ~92 Ma)
- Type: Geological formation
- Unit of: Dashuigou Group

Lithology
- Primary: Claystone, siltstone

Location
- Coordinates: 40.3°N 105.9°E
- Approximate paleocoordinates: 41.5°N 97.2°E
- Region: Inner Mongolia
- Country: China
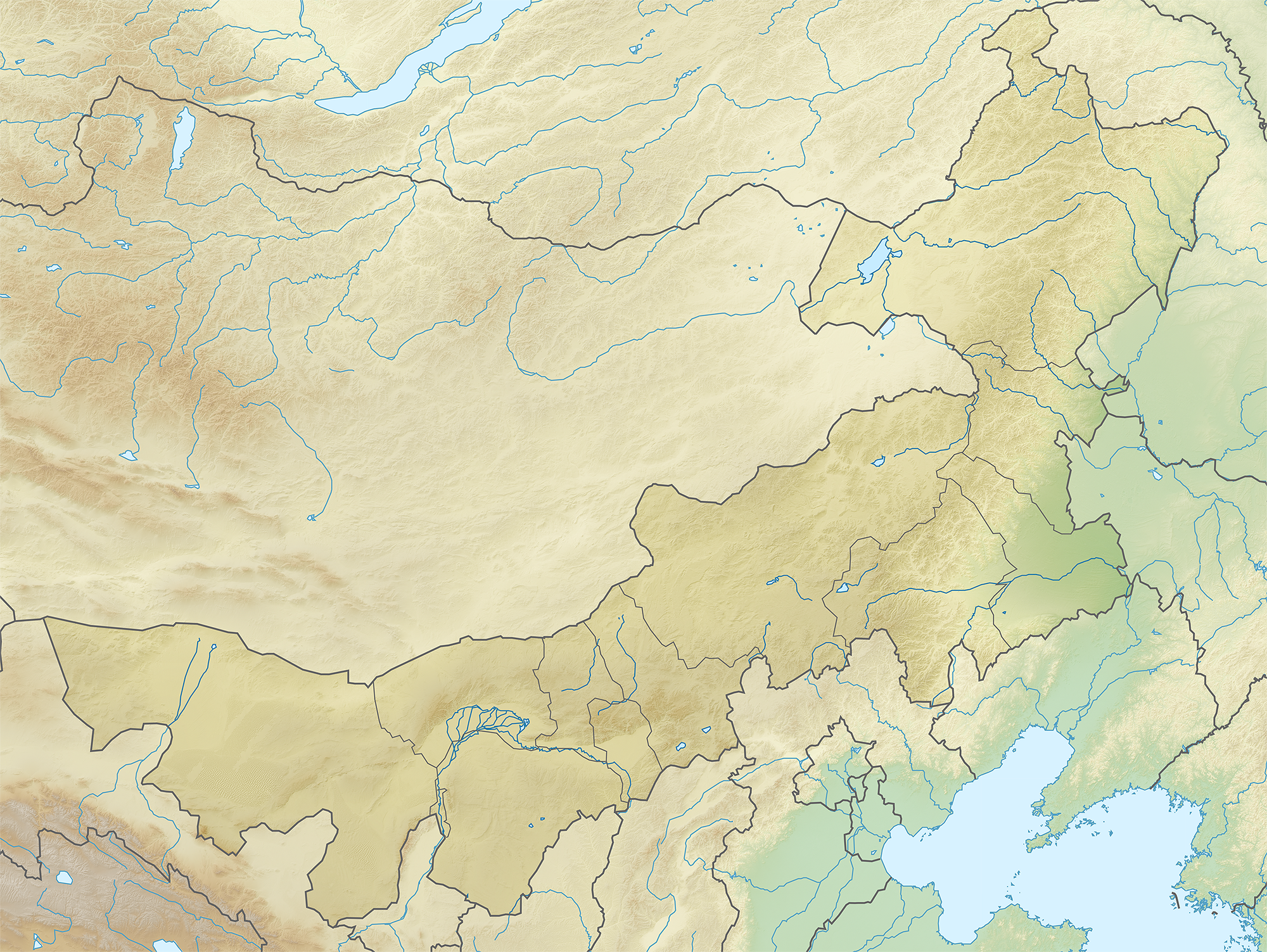
- Ulansuhai Formation (China) Ulansuhai Formation (Inner Mongolia)

The Ulansuhai Formation (simplified Chinese: 乌兰苏海组; traditional Chinese: 烏蘭蘇海組; pinyin: Wūlánsūhǎi Zǔ) is a geological formation in Inner Mongolia, north China. Dinosaur remains are among the fossils that have been recovered from the formation.

The Ulansuhai Formation has traditionally been considered to date to the Aptian-Albian stages of the Lower Cretaceous, due to similarities between the Ulansuhai fauna and known Aptian formations. However, radiometric dating done on underlying formations has shown this to be incorrect. Due to the age of underlying rocks, the Ulansuhai Formation cannot be older than the Turonian stage of the Late Cretaceous, about 92 Ma. Evans et al. (2021) suggested that the formation is likely dated to the Santonian-Campanian ages or older, but younger than 92 million years ago.

== Fossil content ==
Color key: Taxon / Reclassified taxon / Taxon falsely reported as present / Dubious taxon or junior synonym / Ichnotaxon / Ootaxon / Morphotaxon	Notes; Uncertain or tentative taxa are in small text; ~~crossed out~~ taxa are discredited.

=== Dinosaurs ===
==== Ornithischians ====
Ornithischians of the Ulansuhai Formation
Genus	Species	Location	Stratigraphic position	Material	Notes	Images
Iguanodontia indet.	Indeterminate				An indeterminate iguanodontian.	
Sinocephale	S. bexelli			Skull fragments.	A pachycephalosaurine pachycephalosaurid	

==== Theropods ====
Theropods of the Ulansuhai Formation
Genus	Species	Location	Stratigraphic position	Material	Notes	Images
Chilantaisaurus	C. tashuikouensis			Fragmentary postcranial skeleton.	A tetanuran theropod	
Sinornithomimus	S. dongi			"[Fourteen] skeletons, juvenile to adult".	A ornithomimid ornithomimosaur	

=== Turtles ===
Turtles of the Ulansuhai Formation
Genus	Species	Location	Stratigraphic position	Material	Notes	Images
Kuhnemys	K. maortuensis				A pan-trionychid turtle	

=== Crustaceans ===
Crustaceans of the Ulansuhai Formation
Genus	Species	Location	Stratigraphic position	Material	Notes	Images
cf. Cyprididae Indet.	Indeterminate				A cypridid ostracod	

== See also ==
- List of dinosaur-bearing rock formations
