= Birger Bohlin =

Swedish paleontologist (1898–1990)

Dr. Anders Birger Bohlin (26 March 1898 – 28 November 1990) was a Swedish palaeontologist. As well as his work on dinosaurs and prehistoric mammals, Bohlin was part of the group that established the existence of Peking Man (Sinanthropus pekinensis). In the 1950s, the scientific designation of Peking Man was changed when the hominid was generally decided to be a Homo erectus.

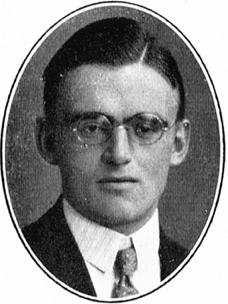
Birger Bohlin

== See also ==
- Peishansaurus
