= List of marginocephalian type specimens =

This list of specimens is a comprehensive catalogue of all the type specimens and their scientific designations for each of the genera and species that are included in the clade marginocephalia.

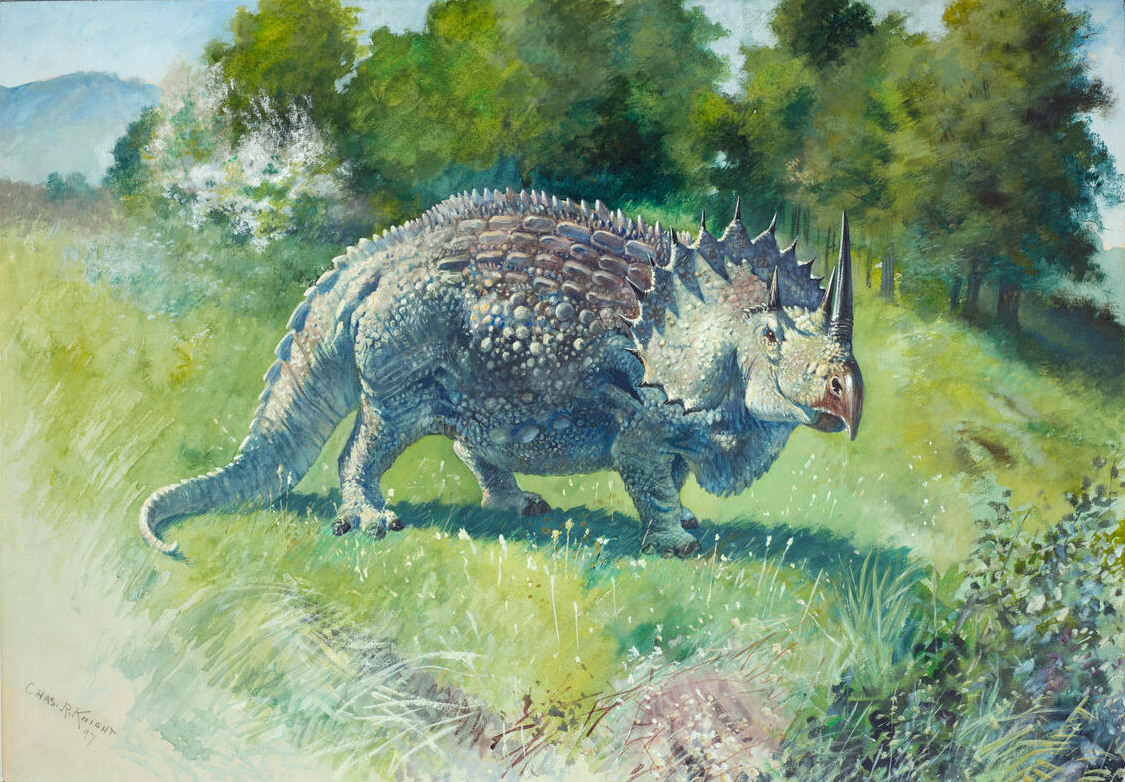
Painting by paleoartist Charles R. Knight of Agathaumas, the first named marginocephalian, from 1897

Marginocephalia is a clade of ornithischian dinosaurs that includes some of the most well-known Mesozoic animals, such as Triceratops and Pachycephalosaurus. The group is united by, and is named for, the presence of a bony margin formed mostly from the parietal and squamosal bones at the posterior end of the skull. Although the first marginocephalian known to scientists, Agathaumas, was described in 1872 by Edward Drinker Cope, the clade itself was not recognized until the latter part of the 20th century when Paul Sereno first united the two major groups, ceratopsians and pachycephalosaurians into a single clade.

Marginocephalians first appeared in the Jurassic period as small bipedal animals. However, they saw an apparent increase in diversity during the Early Cretaceous period which culminated in the emergence of megafaunal forms by the end of the period that weighed in excess of five metric tons. Most of their diversity is known from North America and Asia, with a few remains attributed to the group from Europe, South America, and Australia.

== Scope and terminology ==
This list will include the type fossils of each marginocephalian species. In paleontology, a type specimen is one which is definitionally a member of a biological taxon. Additional specimens can only be "referred" to these taxa if an expert deems them sufficiently similar to the type and publishes that opinion in the scientific literature.

There is no complete, canonical list of all dinosaur taxa or holotype specimens. Attempts are regularly published in the form of books, such as the Princeton Field Guide to Dinosaurs by Gregory Paul and Dinosaurs: The Most Complete, Up-to-Date Encyclopedia for Dinosaur Lovers of All Ages by Thomas Holtz and Luis Rey. Where appropriate, The Paleobiology Database and Fossilworks, which are both online databases of named fossil taxa, are used to supplement the entries from published encyclopedias which are missing or data-deficient.

=== Type system ===
Types are also used to diagnose higher-level taxa than an individual. One individual might represent the "type specimen" of a particular species. This species would in turn represent the "type species" of a particular genus, unless it is referred to a previously described genus. Most dinosaur genera are monospecific, therefore most type specimens are also the type species of their respective genera. On this list, the type species of a genus is only noted when it belongs to a genus with multiple referred species, such as Psittacosaurus or Chasmosaurus. Furthermore, when an animal is different enough from its close relatives that it is given its own family, it is conventional in dinosaur systematics to name a family after the first described, most famous, or most abundant genus assigned to it. Therefore, on this list, the type species of any type genus for a family or sub-family level taxon is also noted when appropriate.

There are several different varieties of type specimen when referring to fossil animals:

- Holotype: This is the most common and simplest form of type specimen. A holotype is the first material of a fossil specimen that is described in the scientific literature. In order to qualify as a true holotype, all of the fossils of the type must belong to the same individual animal. All type specimens on this list are holotypes, unless otherwise indicated.
- Paratype(s): These are described in the same publication as the holotype. A paratype is designated when the fossil material is diagnostic enough to belong to the same species as the holotype, but it is not from the same individual animal. In these cases, the holotype and paratype(s) are collectively called the "type series" for that taxon. On this list, paratypes are noted in the same entry as their associated holotype.
- Neotype: When a holotype specimen is lost, destroyed, or otherwise unable to be studied further by scientists, a new type specimen for that taxon is required in order to identify future material. On this list, neotypes are only given their own entries when the holotype was never formally given a specimen number, otherwise they are noted in the entry for the holotype.
- Syntype(s): This is a type series in which no single specimen is selected to serve as a holotype, nor are any designated as paratypes. This is typically done if the fossil material is believed to be from multiple animals, but none of the individual animals were well-preserved enough to provide a complete list of diagnostic characters. These are also sometimes called "cotypes" in publications, although this is discouraged by the ICZN.
- Lectotype: When a single type specimen from a series of syntypes is designated as the new primary type specimen in a subsequent publication, this is considered to be a lectotype. On this list, lectotypes are given their own entries.
- Paralectotype(s): When a lectotype is designated from a series of syntypes, the remaining syntypes become paralectotypes as part of a reorganized type series. On this list, paralectotypes are noted alongside the list entry for the lectotype of their respective series.
- Plastotype: Sometimes, if a cast of a type specimen is made and the original type specimen is lost or destroyed, the cast can be used for the purposes of diagnostic referral to a taxon. Plastotypes are only given their own entries on this list if the holotype was not given a specimen number. Otherwise, they are noted alongside the entry for the holotype.

All name-bearing type specimens (i.e. holotypes, lectotypes, neotypes, and syntypes) have unique entries on this list, and non-name-bearing types (i.e. paratypes, paralectotypes, and topotypes) are noted alongside their name-bearing counterpart.

=== Validity ===
Some described species are later determined to be invalid by subsequent scientific publications. However, invalid species are sometimes resurrected, such as in the case of Brontosaurus, and sometimes the validity of a species can be controversial among researchers (e.g. the case of Torosaurus and Triceratops). For the purposes of neutrality and completeness, all described species and genera of marginocephalians are included, even those that have been subsequently considered invalid by subsequent scientific publications.

Naming conventions and terminology follow the International Code of Zoological Nomenclature (ICZN). Technical terms used include:

- Junior synonym: A name which describes the same taxon as a previously published name. If two or more taxa are formally designated and the type specimens are later assigned to the same taxon, the first to be published (in chronological order) is the senior synonym, and all other instances are junior synonyms. Senior synonyms are generally used, except by special decision of the ICZN, but junior synonyms cannot be used again, even if deprecated. Junior synonymy is often subjective, unless the genera described were both based on the same type specimen.
- Nomen dubium (Latin for "dubious name"): A name describing a fossil with no unique diagnostic features. This can be an extremely controversial designation, and as such, they are only notated when their supposedly dubious status has been formally published. Furthermore, if the scientific community has yet to reach a consensus on the validity of a name or taxon, the ongoing nature of the controversy will be stated.
- Nomen nudum (Latin for "naked name"): A name that has appeared in print but has not yet been formally published by the standards of the ICZN. Nomina nuda (the plural form) are invalid, and are not included on this list.
- Preoccupied name: A name that is formally published, but which has already been used for another taxon. This second use is invalid (as are all subsequent uses) and the name must be replaced.

=== Omissions ===
Some taxa of marginocephalians are not included on this list. Nomina nuda are not included because a type does not become recognized by the ICZN until it is published in a scientific journal with a full description.

Some misidentified taxa are also not included so long as there is a scientific consensus with regard to the specimen in question. If a specimen is later referred to a taxon outside marginocephalia, it is not included on this list. However, specimens that are identified as marginocephalians in publications subsequent to their initial description are included under the name they are given within marginocephalia. For example, Pachycephalosaurus was originally described as a species of the theropod genus Troodon. This is noted where appropriate, but there is no entry on the list under the name Troodon wyomingensis because the specimen itself is now referred to a taxon within marginocephalia.

Referred taxa are only included on the list as separate entries when their initial description includes a unique type specimen (e.g. Triceratops obtusus or Dracorex hogwartsia).

== List of specimens ==
- Binomial name: All animals species are given a unique binomial name, typically consisting of Latin or Greek words which are used to formally and scientifically identify each species.
- Catalogue number: In most museum collections, each fossil specimen will be given a unique catalogue number which is published with the description of the fossils after they are prepared. This serves as a formal name for every single described fossil so that authors are able to refer to individual fossil discoveries in the scientific literature by name.
- Institution: Most published fossils are stored in museum collections or at universities. This is also true of type specimens, many of which are on display in museums around the world. If a type specimen has been lost, the last known location of the type is listed.
- Age: The geological stage from which the specimen was recovered is listed, when it is known. The exact age of some geological formations is not known. If this is the case, a range of possible ages is given.
- Unit: Most fossils are recovered from named geologic formations (e.g. the Morrison Formation or the Hell Creek Formation). When this is not the case, a city or landmark near the locality from which the fossil was recovered is listed.
- Material: The vast majority of fossils do not preserve the complete skeleton of an animal. In these cases, the specific bones which are fossilized have been listed.
- Notes: Other general information, such as the validity status of the taxon in question, or any other material in the type series may be listed here.

Binomial Name	Catalogue number	Institution	Age	Unit	Material	Notes	Images
Achelousaurus horneri	MOR 485	Museum of the Rockies	Late Campanian	Upper Two Medicine Formation, Alberta	Mostly complete skull		The holotype on display in Colorado
Acrotholus audeti	TMP 2008.045.0001	Royal Tyrell Museum	Santonian	Milk River Formation, Alberta	Frontoparietal skull dome		
Agathaumas sylvestris	AMNH 4000	American Museum of Natural History	Late Maastrichtian	Lance Formation, Wyoming	Numerous vertebrae, a partial pelvis, and several ribs	Nomen dubium, generally considered a chimera or synonymous with Triceratops	Illustration of the holotype material
Agujaceratops mariscalensis	UTEP P.37.7.086	Texas Vertebrate Paleontology Collections, Jackson School Museum of Earth History, The University of Texas at Austin	Late Campanian	Aguja Formation, Texas	Partial skull	Type species of Agujaceratops, originally described as Chasmosaurus mariscalensis	The holotype on display in Austin
Agujaceratops mavericus	TxVP 43098-1	Texas Vertebrate Paleontology Collections	Late Campanian	Aguja Formation, Texas	Nearly complete skull		
Ajkaceratops kozmai	MTM V2009.192.1	Hungarian Natural History Museum	Santonian	Csehbánya Formation, Hungary	Partial beak and rostrum		The holotype without the dentary
Alaskacephale gangloffi	UAM AK-493-V-001	University of Alaska Museum	Early Maastrichtian	Prince Creek Formation, Alaska			
Albalophosaurus yamaguchiorum	SBEI 176	Hakusan City Board of Education	Barremian	Kuwajima Formation, Japan	Incomplete skull and jawbones	May be an ornithopod or some other type of ornithischian	
Albertaceratops nesmoi	TMP.2001.26.1	Royal Tyrrell Museum	Middle Campanian	Oldman Formation, Alberta	Complete skull and postcranial fragments		Holotype skull without the postcranial elements
Amtocephale gobiensis	MPC-D 100/1203	Mongolian Natural History Museum	Uncertain (Albian to Santonian?)	Bayan Shireh Formation, Mongolia	Partial skull dome		
Anchiceratops longirostris	NMC 8535	Canadian Museum of Nature	Early Maastrichtian	Horseshoe Canyon Formation, Alberta	Complete skull	Nomen dubium, may be synonymous with A. ornatus or may represent sexual dimorphism	
Anchiceratops ornatus	AMNH 5251	American Museum of Natural History	Early Maastrichtian	Horseshoe Canyon Formation, Alberta	Partial skull with intact frill	Type species of Anchiceratops	The holotype in lateral view
Aquilops americanus	OMNH 34557	Sam Noble Oklahoma Museum of Natural History	Middle Albian	Cloverly Formation, Montana	Mostly complete skull		The holotype skull from multiple views
Archaeoceratops oshimai	IVPP V11114	Institute of Vertebrate Paleontology and Paleoanthropology	Early Aptian	Digou Formation, Xinminbao Group, Gansu	Skull, vertebrae, pelvis, and partial foot	Type species of Archaeoceratops	The holotype skull from multiple views
Archaeoceratops yujinziensis	CAGS-IG-VD-003	Chinese Academy of Geological Sciences	Late Aptian	Xiagou Formation, Gansu	Vertebrae and partial hindlimb		
Arrhinoceratops brachyops	ROM 796	Royal Ontario Museum	Early Maastrichtian	Horseshoe Canyon Formation, Alberta	Mostly complete skull		The holotype on display in Ontario
Asiaceratops salsopaludalis	CCMGE 9/12457	Saint Petersburg State University	Early Cenomanian	Khodzhakul Formation, Uzbekistan	Partial maxilla	Type species of Asiaceratops, may be a nomen dubium	
Asiaceratops sulcidens	No catalogue number		Uncertain (Aptian to Albian?)	Xinminbao Group, Gansu	Teeth, centra, and hindlimb elements	May be a nomen dubium	
Auroraceratops rugosus	IG-2004-VD-001	Chinese Academy of Geological Sciences	Aptian	Xinminbao Group, Gansu	Nearly complete skull	The holotype is known to be a subadult	A reconstruction of the holotype in situ with a hypothetical postcranial skeleton
Avaceratops lammersi	ANSP 15800	Academy of Natural Sciences of Drexel University	Late Campanian	Judith River Formation, Montana	Partial skull, shoulder, most of the forelimbs, and some vertebrae	Maturation level of the holotype is unresolved, may represent a juvenile, but this is uncertain	Cast of the holotype with missing elements filled in for display
Bagaceratops rozhdestvenskyi	ZPAL MgD-I/126	Polish Academy of Sciences	Early Maastrichtian	Barun Goyot Formation, Mongolia	Mostly complete skull	Generally regarded as the senior synonym for Gobiceratops, Lamaceratops, Magnirostris, and Platyceratops	
Bainoceratops efremovi	PIN 614-33	Russian Academy of Sciences	Campanian	Djadochta Formation, Mongolia	Dorsal vertebrae		
Beg tse	IGM 100/3652	Mongolian Academy of Sciences	Uncertain (Albian?)	Ulaanoosh Formation, Mongolia	Skull		Holotype with skull bones labeled
Bisticeratops froeseorum	NMMNH P-50000	New Mexico Museum of Natural History	Late Campanian	Kirtland Formation, New Mexico	Mostly complete skull		Diagram of the holotype material
Brachyceratops montanensis	USNM 7951	Smithsonian Institution	Campanian	Two Medicine Formation, Montana	Mostly complete skull	May be a nomen dubium, holotype is known to be a juvenile and has been suggested to belong to a juvenile individual of the contemporaneous Styracosaurus or Rubeosaurus	Holotype skull mounted on a hypothetical skeleton
Bravoceratops polyphemus	TxVP 46015-1	Texas Vertebrate Paleontology Collections	Late Maastrichtian	Javelina Formation, Texas	Numerous skull fragments	May or may not be a nomen dubium due to fragmentary nature of the remains	Hypothetical restoration of the skeleton with the holotype material in white
Breviceratops kozlowskii	ZPAL MgD-I/117	Polish Academy of Sciences	Early Maastrichtian	Barun Goyot Formation, Mongolia	Skull and partial postcrania	Was originally Protoceratops kozlowskii, may represent a juvenile Bagaceratops or Protoceratops	Digital reconstruction of the holotype in situ
Centrosaurus apertus	NMC 971	Canadian Museum of Nature	Campanian	Dinosaur Park Formation, Alberta	Mostly complete skull	Originally Monoclonius dawsoni, but later referred to its own genus, type species of the subfamily "Centrosaurinae" and the tribe "Centrosaurini"	Illustration of the holotype
Cerasinops hodgskissi	MOR 300	Museum of the Rockies	Campanian	Two Medicine Formation, Montana	Mostly complete skeleton		The holotype with missing elements filled in
Ceratops montanus	USNM 2411	Smithsonian Institution	Campanian	Upper Judith River Formation, Montana	Lacrimal horns and other skull elements	Nomen dubium, has been tentatively referred to Avaceratops, but is probably undiagnostic, type species of the suborder "Ceratopsia" and the family "Ceratopsidae"	Illustration of the holotype material
Chaoyangsaurus youngi	IGCAGS V371	Chinese Academy of Geological Science	Late Tithonian	Tuchengzi Formation, Manchuria	Partial skull, vertebrae, and forelimb elements	Type species of the family "Chaoyangsauridae"	Diagram of the holotype material
Chasmosaurus belli	NMC 491	Canadian Museum of Nature	Middle Campanian	Lower Dinosaur Park Formation, Alberta	Parietal bone	Type species of Chasmosaurus, originally named a species of the dubious genus Monoclonius, type species of the subfamily "Chasmosaurinae"	
Chasmosaurus brevirostris	ROM 839	Royal Ontario Museum	Campanian	Dinosaur Park Formation, Alberta	Nasal and other skull elements without the frill	Generally considered synonymous with C. belli	
Chasmosaurus canadensis	USNM V6061	Smithsonian Institution	Campanian	Judith River Formation, Montana	Partial dentary	Originally Monoclonius canadensis, was renamed Eoceratops canadensis, now considered Chasmosaurus sp.	
Chasmosaurus kaiseni	AMNH 5401	American Museum of Natural History	Late Campanian	Dinosaur Park Formation, Alberta	Mostly complete skull	May belong to the dubious genus Mojoceratops or be synonymous with C. russelli	The holotype skull on display in New York City
Chasmosaurus russelli	NMC 8800	Canadian Museum of Nature	Late Campanian	Upper Dinosaur Park Formation, Alberta	Parietal and other frill elements	Has been suggested to be synonymous with C. belli	
Coahuilaceratops magnacuerna	CPC 276	Colección Paleontológica de Coahuila	Early Maastrichtian	Cerro Huerta Formation, Mexico	Mostly complete limbs, several vertebrae, and skull elements		Digital reconstruction of the holotype material
Colepiocephale lambei	GSC 8818	Geological Survey of Canada	Early Campanian	Foremost Formation, Alberta	Frontoparietal dome	Originally Stegoceras lambei, but was later given its own genus	The holotype skull from multiple views
Coronosaurus brinkmani	TMP 2002.68.1	Royal Tyrrell Museum	Campanian	Oldman Formation, Alberta	Frill and other skull elements	Originally Centrosaurus brinkmani, later given its own genus	The holotype on display in Alberta
Craspedodon lonzeensis	IRSNB 390	Museum of Natural Sciences in Brussels	Santonian	Glauconie de Lonzée Formation, Belgium	Three isolated teeth	Most recently considered a ceratopsian, but may be an ornithopod	Holotype teeth
Crittendenceratops krzyzanowskii	NMMNH P-34906	New Mexico Museum of Natural History	Late Campanian	Fort Crittenden Formation, Arizona	Parietal and squamosal skull elements		
Diabloceratops eatoni	UMNH VP 16699	Natural History Museum of Utah	Early Campanian	Wahweap Formation, Utah	Partial skull and lower jaw		The skull, minus the lower jaw, in storage in Utah
Dracorex hogwartsia	TCMI 2004.17.1	The Children's Museum of Indianapolis	Late Maastrichtian	Hell Creek Formation	Mostly complete skull and several vertebrae	May be a nomen dubium, this genus has been suggested to be the juvenile form of Pachycephalosaurus wyomingensis	The holotype skull mounted
Einiosaurus parvicursoris	MOR 456-8-9-6-1	Museum of the Rockies	Late Campanian	Upper Two Medicine Formation, Montana	Nasal, supraorbital, and parietal elements of the skull		Holotype skull (A_{1})
Eotriceratops xerinsularis	RTMP 2002.57.5	Royal Tyrrell Museum	Middle Maastrichtian	Upper Horseshoe Canyon Formation, Alberta	Multiple vertebrae, ribs, and parts of the skull	Some researchers have referred this to the genus Triceratops	
Ferrisaurus sustutensis	RBCM P900	Royal British Columbia Museum	Late Maastrichtian	Tango Creek Formation, British Columbia	Front limb, hind limb, and shoulder elements	Specimen is nicknamed "Buster"	Diagram of the holotype material
Foraminacephale brevis	CMN 1423	Canadian Museum of Nature	Campanian	Dinosaur Park Formation, Alberta	Frontoparietal dome	Was originally considered to be Stegoceras brevis, but was recently given its own genus	The holotype skull from multiple views
Furcatoceratops elucidans	NSM PV 24660	National Museum of Nature and Science	Campanian	Judith River Formation, Montana	A mostly complete skeleton with skull fragments and some limb elements missing		The holotype on display in Tokyo
Goyocephale lattimorei	GI SPS 100/1201	Mongolian Academy of Sciences	Early Maastrichtian	Nemegt Formation, Mongolia	Complete skull, numerous caudal vertebrae, partial hip, and hindlimb elements		Diagram of the holotype material
Graciliceratops mongoliensis	ZPAL MgD-I/156	Polish Academy of Sciences	Uncertain (Albian to Santonian?)	Bayan Shireh Formation, Mongolia	Partial skull, mostly complete limbs, numerous vertebrae	Was originally named Microceratops mongoliensis	Diagram of the holotype material
Gravitholus albertae	TMP 1972.027.0001	Royal Tyrrell Museum	Late Campanian	Dinosaur Park Formation, Alberta	Frontoparietal dome		The holotype from above with arrows indicating supposed pathologies
Gremlin slobodorum	TMP 2011.053.0027	Royal Tyrrell Museum	Middle Campanian	Oldman Formation, Alberta	A partial frontal bone		
Gryphoceratops morrisoni	ROM 56635	Royal Ontario Museum	Late Santonian to Early Campanian	Milk River Formation, Alberta	Partial dentary		
Hanssuesia sternbergi	NMC 8817	Canadian Museum of Nature	Middle Campanian	Dinosaur Park Formation, Alberta	Frontoparietal dome	Was erroneously assigned to the genusTroodon before being reassigned to Stegoceras, and finally being given its own genus, though some still consider it synonymous with the latter	
Helioceratops brachygnathus	JLUM L0204-Y-3	Jilin Provincial Museum	Albian	Quantou Formation, Manchuria	Dentary	Paratype specimen includes a partial maxilla of the same scale as the holotype, but it could not be proven that it belongs to the same individual as the holotype	
Homalocephale calathoceros	MPC-D 100/1201	Mongolian Natural History Museum	Early Maastrichtian	Nemegt Formation, Mongolia	Partial skull, mostly complete back legs, and numerous vertebrae	Has been suggested to be a juvenile specimen of Prenocephale, but this is largely rejected	The mounted holotype with missing elements
Hongshanosaurus houi	IVPP V12704	Hong Kong Science Museum	Aptian	Yixian Formation, Liaoning	Several mostly complete skeletons	Nomen dubium, the specimens were renamed Psittacosaurus houi, but are now regarded as a synonym of P. lujiatunensis	The holotype skeletons in situ in Hong Kong
Hualianceratops wucaiwanensis	IVPP V18641	Institute of Vertebrate Paleontology and Paleoanthropology	Early Oxfordian	Upper Shishugou Formation, Xinjiang	Partial postcranial skeleton with skull fragments		Reconstruction with missing skull elements
Ischioceratops zhuchengensis	ZCDM V0O016	Zhucheng Dinosaur Museum	Late Campanian or Early Maastrichtian	Xingezhuang Formation, Wangshi Group, Shandong	Partial legs, hip, and caudal vertebrae		A photo and digital model of the holotype
Judiceratops tigris	YPM VPPU 022404	Yale Peabody Museum	Middle Campanian	Judith River Formation, Montana	Horn, frill, and other skull fragments		Parietal fragment of the holotype from multiple views
Koreaceratops hwaseongensis	KIGAM VP 200801	Korean University of Science and Technology	Albian	Shiwa Formation, South Korea	Mostly complete tail and hind limb elements		Skeletal reconstruction with the holotype elements on top
Kosmoceratops richardsoni	UMNH VP 17000	Natural History Museum of Utah	Middle to Late Campanian	Kaiparowits Formation, Utah	Mostly complete skull, numerous ribs, vertebrae, and a partial hip		The holotype skull from multiple views
Kulceratops kulensis	CCMGE 495/12457	Chernyshev Central Geologic Exploration Museum	Late Albian	Khodzhakul Formation, Uzbekistan	Mostly complete maxilla		
Leptoceratops gracilis	AMNH 5205	American Museum of Natural History	Maastrichtian	Scollard Formation, Saskatchewan	Partial skeleton	Type species of the family "Leptoceratopsidae"	Forelimb of the holotype specimen
Liaoceratops yanzigouensis	IVPP V12738	Institute of Vertebrate Paleontology and Paleoanthropology	Barremian	Yixian Formation, Liaoning	Mostly complete skull		Diagram of the holotype material
Lokiceratops rangiformis	EMK 0012	Museum of Evolution	Campanian	Judith River Formation, Montana	Mostly complete skull, shoulder, hip bones, and several vertebrae		A skeletal reconstruction with the holotype material in orange
Machairocerastops cronusi	UMNH VP 20550	Natural History Museum of Utah	Early Campanian	Wahweap Formation	Partial skull		Diagram of the holotype material
Magnirostris dodsoni	IVPP V12513	Institute of Vertebrate Paleontology and Paleoanthropology	Middle to Late Campanian	Bayan Mandahu Formation, Inner Mongolia	Partial skull with dentary	Now considered to be a junior synonym of Bagaceratops	The snout of the holotype
Medusaceratops lokii	WDC DJR 001	Wyoming Dinosaur Center	Late Campanian	Upper Judith River Formation, Montana	Parietal frill		Mounted cast of the holotype with the missing elements filled in
Menefeeceratops sealeyi	NMMNH P-25052	New Mexico Museum of Natural History	Early Campanian	Menefee Formation, New Mexico	fragmentary skull, dentary, fragmentary vertebrae, ribs, limb elements, and a partial hip		
Mercuriceratops gemini	ROM 64222	Royal Ontario Museum	Middle Campanian	Judith River Formation, Montana	Squamosal bones		
Micropachycephalosaurus hongtuyanensis	IVPP V5542	Institute of Vertebrate Paleontology and Paleoanthropology	Late Campanian or Early Maastrichtian	Jiangjunding Formation, Shandong	Partial skull including dentary with fragmentary vertebrae, chevrons, and limb elements		The illium associated with the holotype
Mojoceratops perifania	TMP 1983.25.1	American Museum of Natural History	Late Campanian	Dinosaur Park Formation, Alberta	Mostly complete skull	May be synonymous with Chasmosaurus russelli or belong to its own species, C. kasenai (see above)	
Monoclonius crassus	AMNH 3998	American Museum of Natural History	Campanian	Judith River Formation, Montana	Mostly complete parietal frill	Type species of Monoclonius, probably a nomen dubium and generally considered a junior synonym of Centrosaurus apertus	Illustration of the holotype
Monoclonius cutleri	AMNH 5427	American Museum of Natural History	Campanian	Oldman Formation, Alberta	Partial skeleton	Nomen dubium and junior synonym of Centrosaurus apertus	
Monoclonius dawsoni	NMC 1173	Canadian Museum of Nature	Campanian	Dinosaur Park Formation, Alberta	Partial skull and scapula	Nomen dubium and junior synonym of Centrosaurus apertus	
Monoclonius fissus	AMNH 3988	American Museum of Natural History	Campanian	Dinosaur Park Formation, Alberta	Skull	Nomen dubium and junior synonym of Centrosaurus apertus	
Monoclonius flexus	AMNH 5239	American Museum of Natural History	Campanian	Dinosaur Park Formation, Alberta	Mostly complete skull	Nomen dubium and junior synonym of Centrosaurus apertus	The holotype on display in New York City
Monoclonius longirostris	NMC 8795	Canadian Museum of Nature	Late Campanian	Dinosaur Park Formation, Alberta	Skull	Nomen dubium and junior synonym of Centrosaurus apertus	
Monoclonius lowei	CMN 8790	Canadian Museum of Nature	Campanian	Upper Dinosaur Park Formation, Alberta	Skull without dentary	Nomen dubium, but has not been referred to another genus or species	The holotype from multiple views
Monoclonius nasicornus	AMNH 5351	American Museum of Natural History	Campanian	Dinosaur Park Formation, Alberta	Partial skeleton	Nomen dubium, has also been referred to the genus Centrosaurus, but is generally considered to be a synonym of Styracosaurus albertensis	
Monoclonius recurvicornis	AMNH 3999	American Museum of Natural History	Campanian	Dinosaur Park Formation, Alberta	Partial skull elements	Nomen dubium, but has not been referred to another genus or species	An illustration of the holotype
Monoclonius sphenocerus	AMNH 3989	American Museum of Natural History	Campanian	Dinosaur Park Formation, Alberta	Nasal horn and other skull fragments	Nomen dubium, but has not been referred to another genus or species	The holotype of M. sphenocerus labeled with a 2
Montanoceratops cerorhynchus	AMNH 5464	American Museum of Natural History	Easly Maastrichtian	Horseshoe Canyon Formation, Alberta	Mostly complete skull, vertebra, and hind foot with partial rib and limb elements	Originally considered a new species of Leptoceratops, but later given its own genus	Mounted skeleton based on the holotype material
Mosaiceratops azumai	ZMNH M8856	Zhejiang Museum of Natural History	Uncertain (Turonian to Campanian?)	Xiaguan Formation, Henan	Mostly complete pelvis and legs with partial ribs, skull, and arm elements		The holotype in situ along with a digital reconstruction
Nasutoceratops titusi	UMNH VP 16800	Natural History Museum of Utah	Late Campanian	Kaiparowits Formation, Utah	Mostly complete skull, shoulders, and forelimbs with fragmentary vertebrae	Type species of the tribe "Nasutoceratopsini"	The holotype material from multiple views with skull bones labeled
Navajoceratops sullivani	SMP VP-1500	State Museum of Pennsylvania	Late Campanian	Kirtland Formation, New Mexico	Parietal bones of the frill		The holotype parietal bones
Nedoceratops hatcheri	USNM 2412	Smithsonian Institution	Late Maastrichtian	Lance Formation, Wyoming	Complete skull without dentary	Was originally named Diceratops before it was discovered that this name was taken by a genus of wasp and was later renamed Diceratus before eventually being named Nedoceratops in 2008, might belong to Triceratops hatcheri or may simply be a specimen of Triceratops with unusual morphology	The holotype on display in Washington D.C.
Notoceratops bonarellii	Not catalogued	N/A, holotype has been lost	Maastrichtian	Lago Colhué Huapí Formation, Patagonia	Partial dentary	Nomen dubium, no other ceratopsian material is known from South America and the fragmentary nature was not studied enough to properly diagnose according to modern standards	An illustration of the holotype
Ojoceratops fowleri	SMP VP-1865	State Museum of Pennsylvania	Maastrichtian	Ojo Alamo Formation, New Mexico	Squamosal skull bone	Has been suggested to be a synonym of Triceratops or possibly Eotriceratops	A reconstruction of the holotype with other referred material
Ornatotholus browni	AMNH 5450	American Museum of Natural History	Campanian	Dinosaur Park Formation, Alberta	Frontoparietal dome	Nomen dubium, multiple studies have indicated that the holotype is probably a juvenile of the species Stegoceras validum	The holotype shown from multiple views
Pachycephalosaurus grangeri	AMNH 1696	American Museum of Natural History	Maastrichtian	Lance Formation, Wyoming	Skull without dentary	Now considered a junior synonym of Pachycephalosaurus wyomingensis	The skull on display in New York City
Pachycephalosaurus reinheimeri	DMNH 469	Denver Museum of Nature and Science	Maastrichtian	Lance Formation, Wyoming	Frontoparietal dome	Now considered a junior synonym of Pachycephalosaurus wyomingensis	The holotype shown from multiple views
Pachycephalosaurus wyomingensis	USNM 12031	Smithsonian Institution	Maastrichtian	Lance Formation, Wyoming	Skull	Type species of Pachycephalosaurus, originally classified under the genus Troodon because of the similarity of its teeth to troodontid teeth, type species of the suborder "Pachycephalosauria", the family "Pachycephalosauridae", the subfamily "Pachycephalosaurinae", and the tribe "Pachycephalosaurini"	
Pachyrhinosaurus canadensis	NMC 8867	Canadian Museum of Nature	Early Maastrichtian	Horseshoe Canyon Formation, Alberta	Partial skull	Type species of Pachyrhinosaurus and of the tribe "Pachyrhinosaurini"	
Pachyrhinosaurus lakustai	TMP 1986.55.258	Royal Tyrrell Museum	Campanian	Wapiti Formation, Alberta	Skull		The holotype skull on display with missing elements reconstructed with plaster
Pachyrhinosaurus perotorum	DMNH21200	Denver Museum of Natural History	Early or Middle Maastrichtian	Prince Creek Formation, Alaska	Partial skull		The holotype shown from multiple views
Pentaceratops aquilonius	CMN 9813	Canadian Museum of Nature	Campanian	Dinosaur Park Formation, Alberta	Fragmentary skull elements	May be synonymous with Vagaceratops, Chasmosaurus, or Spiclypeus, material has been argued to be undiagnostic	The holotype material shown with multiple interpretations of its nature
Pentaceratops fenestratus	PMU.R200	Uppsala University	Middle or Late Campanian	Kirtland Formation, New Mexico	Partial skull and relatively complete postcrania	Now considered a nomen dubium because the autapomorphy used to diagnose the new species was considered to be an injury or pathology	Illustration of the holotype skull in lateral view
Pentaceratops sternbergii	AMNH 6325	American Museum of Natural History	Late Campanian	Fruitland Formation, New Mexico	Mostly complete skull	Type species of Pentaceratops	A photo of the holotype in lateral view
Platytholus clemensi	MOR 2915	Museum of the Rockies	Maastrichtian	Hell Creek Formation, Montana	Partial skull		
Polyonax mortuarius	AMNH FR 3950	American Museum of Natural History	Uncertain	Colorado, locality not listed	Horn fragments and vertebrae	Nomen dubium, material too fragmentary to refer to a particular genus or species	
Prenocephale prenes	ZPAL MgD-I/104	Polish Academy of Sciences	Maastrichtian	Nemegt Formation, Mongolia	Skull without a dentary		Holotype skull in lateral view
Prenoceratops pieganensis	TCM 2003.1.1	The Children's Museum of Indianapolis	Campanian	Two Medicine Formation	Articulated jaw bones	Specimen is nicknamed "Frannie"	A mounted cast composite modeled after the holotype and other associated specimens
Protoceratops andrewsi	AMNH 6251	American Museum of Natural History	Campanian	Djadochta Formation, Mongolia	Rostrum	Type species of Protoceratops and of the family "Protoceratopsidae"	The holotype material with a ruler for scale
Protoceratops hellenikorhinus	IMM 95BM1/1	Inner Mongolia Museum	Late Campanian	Bayan Mandahu Formation, Inner Mongolia	Complete skull		The holotype on display in Hohhot
Psittacosaurus amitabha	IGM 100/1132	Mongolian Academy of Sciences	Barremian	Andakhuduk Formation, Mongolia	Mostly complete skull		
Psittacosaurus gobiensis	LH PV2	Long Hao Institute of Geology and Paleontology	Late Barremian or Albian	Bayin-Gobi Formation, Inner Mongolia	Mostly complete skeleton including gastroliths		
Psittacosaurus guyangensis	CAGS-IG V35	Chinese Academy of Geological Sciences	Barremian to Aptian	Guyang Formation, Inner Mongolia	Anterior of the skull	Nomen dubium and junior synonym of P. mongoliensis	
Psittacosaurus lujiatunensis	ZMNH M8137	Zhejiang Museum of Natural History	Aptian	Yixian Formation, Liaoning	Skull including dentary		Cast of the holotype in Brussels
Psittacosaurus major	LH PV1	Long Hao Institute of Geology and Paleontology	Late Barremian or Early Aptian	Yixian Formation	Mostly complete skeleton with skull		The holotype, not including the post-cranial elements, shown from multiple views
Psittacosaurus mazongshanensis	IVPP V12165	Institute of Vertebrate Paleontology and Paleoanthropology	Barremian	Xinminbao Group, Gansu	Partial lower jaw and maxilla	Nomen dubium, too fragmentary to refer to any specific species	
Psittacosaurus meileyingensis	IVPP V7705	Institute of Vertebrate Paleontology and Paleoanthropology	Albian	Jiufotang Formation, Liaoning	Mostly complete skull without jugals		
Psittacosaurus mongoliensis	AMNH 6254	American Museum of Natural History	Uncertain (Aptian or Albian?)	Khukhtek Formation, Mongolia	Nearly complete skull and fully articulated skeleton	Type species of Psittacosaurus and of the monogeneric family "Psittacosauridae"	The holotype in situ on display in New York City
Psittacosaurus neimongoliensis	IVPP 12–0888-2	Institute of Vertebrate Paleontology and Paleoanthropology	Aptian to Albian	Ejinhoro Formation, Inner Mongolia	Articulated skeleton with skull		
Psittacosaurus ordosensis	IVPP 07–08888-1	Institute of Vertebrate Paleontology and Paleoanthropology	Aptian to Albian	Ejinhoro Formation, Inner Mongolia	Half of a skull and a partial hind limb	Possibly a nomen dubium, may be a junior synonym of P. sinensis, but further material is awaiting description	
Psittacosaurus osborni	IVPP V41039	Institute of Vertebrate Paleontology and Paleoanthropology	Uncertain (Aptian or Albian?)	Not listed, Guyang County	Partial skull	Nomen dubium and junior synonym of P. mongoliensis	
Psittacosaurus sattayaraki	TF 2449a	Phu Wiang Dinosaur Museum	Albian	Khot Kruat Formation, Thailand	Partial dentary	Nomen dubium, may not be diagnostic enough to refer to a particular genus, but some authors regard it as valid	
Psittacosaurus sibiricus	PM TGU 16/4-20	Tomsk State University	Uncertain (younger than Albian)	Ilek Formation, Kemerovo	Skull with articulated skeleton		The holotype on a temporary display in Moscow
Psittacosaurus sinensis	IVPP V738	Institute of Vertebrate Paleontology and Paleoanthropology	Barremian to Albian	Qingshan Group, Shandong	Mostly complete skull and articulated skeleton		
Psittacosaurus tingi	IVPP V31040	Institute of Vertebrate Paleontology and Paleoanthropology	Uncertain (Aptian or Albian?)	Not listed, Guyang County	Fragmentary skull elements	Nomen dubium, the holotype is known to be a juvenile and has been considered a junior synonym of P. osborni and P. mongoliensis	
Psittacosaurus xinjiangensis	IVPP V7698	Institute of Vertebrate Paleontology and Paleoanthropology	Aptian	Lianmuqin Formation, Xinjiang	Partial skull and articulated skeleton lacking some limb and tail elements		
Psittacosaurus youngi	BNHM BPV149	Museum of Vertebrate Zoology	Barremian to Albian	Doushan Formation, Qingshan Group, Shandong	Complete skull with partial hip, vertebrae, and limb elements	Nomen dubium, generally considered a junior synonym of P. sinensis	The holotype on display in situ in Zhengzhou
Regaliceratops peterhewsi	TMP 2005.055.0001	Royal Tyrrell Museum	Early Maastrichtian	St. Mary River Formation, Alberta	Mostly complete skull	Specimen is nicknamed "Hellboy"	The holotype on display with missing elements filled in
Sasayamagnomus saegusai	MNHAH D1-060516	Museum of Nature and Human Activities	Early Albian	Ohyamashimo Formation, Japan	Partial skull and lower jaw	Several specimens were referred in the description, but these were not included in the holotype	
Serendipaceratops arthurcclarkei	NMV P186385	Melbourne Museum	Early Aptian	Wonthaggi Formation, Victoria	Ulna	Considered a nomen dubium, remains are so fragmentary that some believe it is not possible to diagnose them as a ceratopsian, some have referred the holotype to ankylosauria	
Sierraceratops turneri	NMMNH P-76870	New Mexico Museum of Natural History	Late Campanian or Early Maastrichtian	Hall Lake Formation, New Mexico	Mostly complete skull and forelimb with a few vertebrae		A vertebra from the holotype
Sinocephale bexelli	Not catalogued and now lost	Institute of Vertebrate Paleontology and Paleoanthropology was the holotype's last recorded location	Turonian, presumably	Uncertain, probably the Ulansuhai Formation, Inner Mongolia	Partial skull	Originally Troodon bexelli before being moved to the genus Stegoceras, specimens AMNH 2073 and PMU 23186 are plaster casts of the original holotype that were made and were used to diagnose it as a new genus	
Sinoceratops zhuchengensis	ZCDM V0010	Zhucheng Dinosaur Museum	Late Campanian or Early Maastrichtian	Xingezhuang Formation, Shandong	Partial skull with intact braincase		Digital reconstruction of the holotype skull viewed from the side
Sphaerotholus buchholtzae	TMP 87.113.3	Royal Tyrrell Museum	Maastrichtian	Hell Creek Formation, Montana	Incomplete skull	Once considered a junior synonym of S. edmontonensis, now generally considered its own species	
Sphaerotholus edmontonensis	GSC 8830	Canadian Museum of Nature			Frotoparietal dome	Originally assigned to Troodon before being renamed as a species of Prenocephale and later Stegoceras before being referred to Sphaerotholus	
Sphaerotholus goodwini	NMMNH P-27403	New Mexico Museum of Natural History	Campanian	Kirtland Formation, New Mexico	Incomplete skull	Type species of Sphaerotholus	
Sphaerotholus lyonsi	TMP 2002.12.63	Royal Tyrell Museum	Campanian	Dinosaur Park Formation, Alberta	One of the squamosals		
Sphaerotholus triregnum	ROM 53583	Royal Ontario Museum	Maastrichtian	Hell Creek Formation, Montana	Partial frontoparietal dome		
Spiclypeus shipporum	CMN 57081	Canadian Museum of Nature	Late Campanian	Judith River Formation, Montana	Partial skull with a few vertebrae, ribs, and limb bones		Holotype with frill elements labeled
Sphaerotholus triregnum	ROM 53583	Royal Ontario Museum	Late Maastrichtian	Hell Creek Formation, Montana	One of the squamosals		
Spinops sternbergorum	NHMUK R16307	Natural History Museum, London	Campanian	Oldman Formation or Dinosaur Park Formation, Alberta	Partial parietal		The bones of the holotype labeled and shown in multiple views
Stegoceras novomexicanum	NMMNH P-33983	New Mexico Museum of Natural History	Campanian	Fruitland Formation, New Mexico	Frontoparietal dome	May be a nomen dubium, holotype may be a juvenile and has been referred variously to Stegoceras sp., S. validum, and Sphaerotholus goodwini	
Stegoceras validum	NMC 515	Canadian Museum of Nature	Campanian	Dinosaur Park Formation, Alberta	Frontoparietal dome	Type species of Stegoceras, there were initially two "syntypes", but one was selected as the "lectotype" or "new holotype"	The holotype shown from multiple views
Stellasaurus ancellae	MOR 492	Museum of the Rockies	Late Campanian	Two Medicine Formation, Montana	Parietal frill with epiossifications, nasal horn, and other skull elements		Parietal portion of the holotype
Stenopelix valdensis	GZG 741/2	University of Göttingen	Late Berriasian	Obernkirchen Sandstein Formation, Germany	Mostly complete ribs, vertebrae, hips, tail, and limbs with no skull		Plaster casts of the holotype alongside digital reconstructions
Stenotholus kohleri	MPM 7111	University of California Museum of Paleontology	Maastrichtian	Hell Creek Formation, Montana	Partial skull with an intact braincase	Nomen dubium and probably a junior synonym of Pachycephalosaurus wyomingensis or Stygimoloch spinifer	
Stygimoloch spinifer	UCMP 110433	University of California Museum of Paleontology	Maastrichtian	Hell Creek Formation, Montana	Skull	Validity disputed, has been considered Pachycephalosaurus spinifer or a juvenile form of P. wyomingensis	Skull elements of the holotype laid out individually
Styracosaurus albertensis	NMC 344	Canadian Museum of Nature	Campanian	Dinosaur Park Formation, Alberta	Complete skull	Type species of Styracosaurus	The holotype on display mounted on a restored skeleton
Styracosaurus ovatus	USNM 11869	Smithsonian Institution	Campanian	Two Medicine Formation, Alberta	Partial frill with epiparietals	Originally assigned to Styracosaurus, this specimen was later given its own genus, Rubeosaurus, now broadly considered to either be S. ovatus or a junior synonym of S. albertensis	The holotype frill with elements labeled
Styracosaurus parksi	AMNH 5372	American Museum of Natural History	Campanian	Dinosaur Park Formation, Alberta	Mostly complete skeleton	Now considered a junior synonym of S. albertensis	The holotype in a display at the American Museum of Natural History
Tatankaceratops sacrinsonorum	BHI 6226	Black Hills Institute	Late Maastrichtian	Hell Creek Formation, South Dakota	Partial skull	Nomen dubium, generally considered to be a juvenile or aberrant specimen of Triceratops	Diagram of the holotype material
Terminocavus sealeyi	NMMNH P-27468	New Mexico Museum of Natural History	Late Campanian	Kirtland Formation, New Mexico	Parietal with other skull elements and vertebral fragments		The holotype shown from the front and behind
Texacephale langstoni	LSUMNS 20010	Louisiana State University Museum of Natural Science	Late Campanian	Aguja Formation, Texas	Frontoparietal bone		Skull dome of the holotype shown in multiple views
Titanoceratops ouranos	OMNH 10165	Sam Noble Oklahoma Museum of Natural History	Late Campanian	Upper Fruitland Formation or Lower Kirtland Formation, New Mexico	Partial skull, numerous limb bones, fragmentary ribs and vertebrae		Diagram of the holotype material
Torosaurus gladius	YPM 1831	Yale Peabody Museum	Maastrichtian	Lance Formation, Wyoming	Skull	Nomen dubium, found to be a junior synonym of T. latus	Holotype (top) compared to a putative Torosaurus subadult
Torosaurus latus	YPM 1830	Yale Peabody Museum	Maastrichtian	Lance Formation, Wyoming	Mostly complete skull	Type species of Torosaurus, has been argued to be a junior synonym of Triceratops, but this has not been widely accepted	Illustration of the holotype by Othniel Charles Marsh
Torosaurus utahensis	USNM 15583	Smithsonian Institution	Maastrichtian	North Horn Formation, Utah	Parietal and quadrate fragments		
Triceratops albertensis	NMC 8862	Canadian Museum of Nature	Maastrichtian	Scollard Formation, Alberta	Partial skull	Nomen dubium, junior synonym of T. horridus	
Triceratops alticornis	USNM V4739	Smithsonian Institution	Maastrichtian	Denver Formation, Colorado	Horns and brow ridge	Nomen dubium, originally misidentified as a species of Bison before being referred to Triceratops, now considered Triceratops sp.	An illustration of the holotype
Triceratops brevicornus	YPM 1834	Yale Peabody Museum	Maastrichtian	Lance Formation, Wyoming	Partial skull	Junior synonym of T. horridus	
Triceratops calicornis	USNM 4928	Smithsonian Institution	Maastrichtian	Lance Formation, Wyoming	Skull and partial skeleton	Junior synonym of T. horridus	An illustration of the holotype
Triceratops elatus	USNM V1201	Smithsonian Institution	Maastrichtian	Lance Formation, Wyoming	Partial skull	Junior synonym of T. horridus	An illustration of the holotype
Triceratops eurycephalus	MCZ 1102	Museum of Comparative Zoology	Maastrichtian	Lance Formation, Wyoming	Partial skeleton	Junior synonym of T. horridus	
Triceratops flabellatus	YPM 1821	Yale Peabody Museum	Maastrichtian	Lance Formation, Wyoming	Skull	Junior synonym of T. horridus	An illustration of the holotype skull from below, showing the palate
Triceratops galeus	USNM V2410	Smithsonian Institution	Maastrichtian	Denver Formation, Colorado	Fragmentary parietal	Junior synonym of T. horridus	
Triceratops horridus	YPM 1820	Yale Peabody Museum	Maastrichtian	Lance Formation, Wyoming	Mostly complete skull	Type species of Triceratops, official dinosaur of the state of Wyoming, originally named Ceratops horridus before being given its own genus, type species of the tribe "Triceratopsini"	An illustration of the holotype
Triceratops ingens	YPM 1828	Yale Peabody Museum	Maastrichtian	Never formally published and described	Partial skull	Nomen dubium, it is not certain if this is T. horridus, T. prorsus, of T. sp.	
Triceratops maximus	AMNH 5040	American Museum of Natural History	Maastrichtian	Hell Creek Formation, Montana	Eight vertebrae and a few rib fragments	Nomen dubium, material is not diagnostic enough to assign it to any particular genus	
Triceratops obtusus	USNM 4720	Smithsonian Institution	Maastrichtian	Lance Formation, Wyoming	Partial skull	Nicknamed "Hatcher", junior synonym of T. horridus	Hatcher on display in Washington, D.C.
Triceratops prorsus	YPM 1822	Yale Peabody Museum	Maastrichtian	Laramie Formation, Wyoming	Complete skull	The only other species of Triceratops, besides T. horridus that is universally considered to be valid	The holotype of T. prorsus (top) compared to a specimen nicknamed "Yoshi's Trike"
Triceratops serratus	YPM 1823	Yale Peabody Museum	Maastrichtian	Laramie Formation, Colorado	Mostly complete skull	Junior synonym of T. horridus	Illustration of the holotype
Triceratops sulcatus	USNM V4286	Smithsonian Institution	Maastrichtian	Lance Formation, Wyoming	Jaw fragment with partial horn core	Junior synonym of T. horridus	Illustration of the jaw portion of the holotype from multiple views
Turanoceratops tardabilis	CCMGE 251/12457	Chernyshev Central Museum of Geological Exploration	Turonian	Bissekty Formation, Uzbekistan	Partial maxilla		
Tylocephale gilmorei	ZPAL MgD-I/105	Polish Academy of Sciences	Campanian	Barun Goyot Formation, Mongolia	Mostly complete skull		Diagram of the holotype material
Tylosteus ornatus	ANSP 8568	Academy of Natural Sciences of Drexel University	Maastrichtian	Lance Formation, Montana	Partial skull	Nomen dubium, was named before Pachycephalosaurus, and probably refers to the same animal, but the latter name was given priority	
Udanoceratops tchizhovi	PIN 3907/11	Russian Academy of Sciences	Campanian	Djadochta Formation, Mongolia	Mostly complete skull and a few vertebrae		Diagram of the holotype material
Ugrosaurus olsoni	UCMP 128561	Museum of Vertebrate Zoology	Late Maastrichtian	Hell Creek Formation, Montana	Fragments of the premaxilla, dentary, and parietal bones	Nomen dubium, not diagnostic from Triceratops, which existed in the same time and place as U. olsoni	
Unescoceratops kopelhusae	TMP 95.12.6	Royal Tyrrell Museum	Campanian	Dinosaur Park Formation, Alberta	Partial dentary		
Utahceratops gettyi	UMNH VP 16784	Utah Museum of Natural History	Campanian	Kaiparowits Formation, Utah	Disarticulated, mostly complete skull		Labeled holotype elements with a reconstruction of a complete skull below
Vagaceratops irvinensis	CMN 41357	Canadian Museum of Nature	Late Campanian	Dinosaur Park Formation, Alberta	Frill and mostly complete postcrania	Sometimes considered to belong to the genus Chasmosaurus as the species C. irvinensis	The holotype on display as it was found
Wannanosaurus yansiensis	IVPP V4447	Institute of Vertebrate Paleontology and Paleoanthropology	Early or Middle Maastrichtian	Xiaoyan Formation, Anhui	Partial skull roof and lower jaw, femur, tibia, part of a rib, and other postcranial fragments		Skull fragments of the holotype, with the postcranial elements omitted
Wendiceratops pinhornensis	TMP2011.051.0009	Royal Tyrrell Museum	Campanian	Oldman Formation, Alberta	Parietal bone		The holotype shown from multiple views with the epiparietals labeled
Xenoceratops foremostensis	CMN 53282	Canadian Museum of Nature	Early Campanian	Foremost Formation, Alberta	Parietal bone		
Xuanhuaceratops niei	IVPP 12722	Institute of Vertebrate Paleontology and Paleoanthropology	Tithonian	Houcheng Formation, Hebei	Mostly complete skull, numerous vertebrae, partial hip, shoulder, and limb elements		
Yamaceratops dorngobiensis	IGM 100/1315	Mongolian Academy of Sciences	Santonian	Javkhlant Formation, Mongolia	Mostly complete skull		Holotype shown from multiple views
Yinlong downsi	IVPP V14530	Institute of Vertebrate Paleontology and Paleoanthropology	Oxfordian	Shishugou Formation, Xinjiang	Complete skeleton with skull		
Zhuchengceratops inexpectus	ZCDM V0015	Zhucheng Dinosaur Museum	Early Maastrichtian	Xingezhuang Formation, Shandong	Partial skull with a mostly complete skeleton		The skull and jaw elements of the holotype
Zuniceratops christopheri	MSM P2101	Arizona Museum of Natural History	Turonian	Moreno Hill Formation, New Mexico	Partial skull and limb elements		

== See also ==
- List of ornithopod type specimens
- List of non-avian theropod type specimens
- List of sauropodomorph type specimens
- List of thyreophoran type specimens
- List of other ornithischian type specimens
- List of Mesozoic birds
