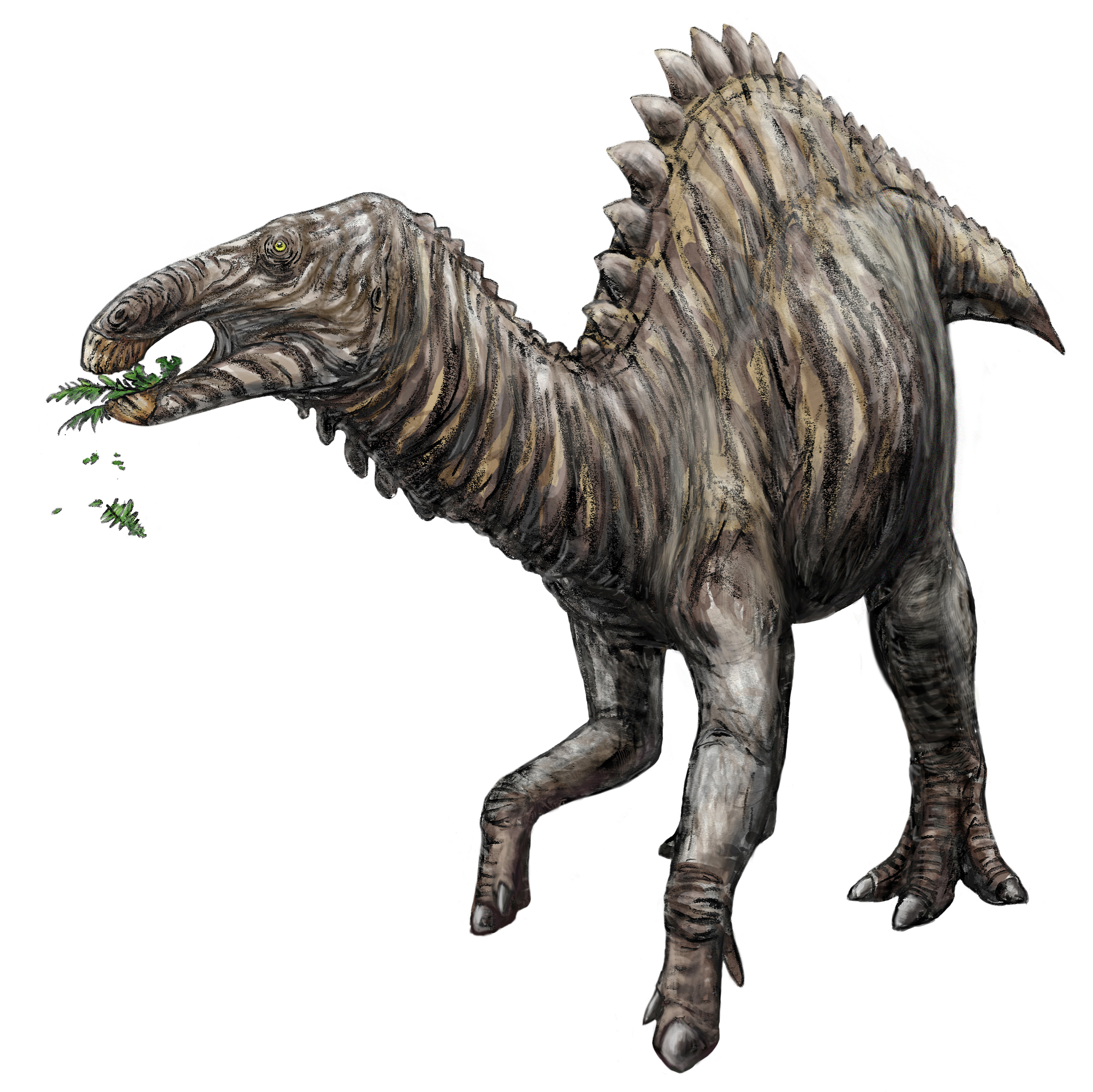
- Restoration of T. sinensis

Scientific classification
- Kingdom: Animalia
- Phylum: Chordata
- Clade: Dinosauria
- Clade: †Ornithischia
- Clade: †Ornithopoda
- Clade: †Hadrosauromorpha
- Genus: †Tanius; Wiman, 1929

Species
- T. sinensis Wiman, 1929 (type); T. chingkankouensis Young, 1958 (nomen dubium)

= Tanius =

Tanius Temporal range: Late Cretaceous, 72–71 Ma

Extinct genus of dinosaurs

Tanius (meaning "of Tan") is a genus of hadrosauroid dinosaur. It lived in the Late Cretaceous of China. The type species, named and described in 1929 by Carl Wiman, is Tanius sinensis. The generic name honours the Chinese paleontologist Tan Xichou ("H.C. Tan"). The specific epithet refers to China. In 2010 Gregory S. Paul estimated the length of Tanius at 7 metres (23 ft) and its weight at 2 metric tons (2.2 short tons).

== Discovery and species ==
In April 1923, H. C. T'an discovered the remains in the east of Shandong at the village of Ch'ing-kang-kou, ten kilometres southeast of Lai Yang. In October of the same year they were excavated by Tan's associate, the Austrian paleontologist Otto Zdansky. Although the specimen was originally rather complete, only parts could be salvaged. The holotype, PMU R.240, was recovered from the Jiangjunding Formation of the Wangshi Series dating from the Campanian. It consists of the back of the skull, which was flat and elongated.

Other species originally assigned to Tanius have been moved to other genera. These include: Tanius prynadai named in 1939 by Anatoly Nikolaevich Ryabinin, which was assigned to Bactrosaurus; and Tanius chingkankouensis named in 1958 by Yang Zhongjian, and Tanius laiyangensis named in 1976 by Zhen Shuonan, which were both later considered junior subjective synonyms of Tsintaosaurus. However, a more recent study, Zhang et al. (2017) determined that T. sinensis and T. chingkankouensis were valid species of Tanius, and that T. laiyangensis was probably not valid. Zhang et al. (2019) re-assessed "Tanius" laiyangensis as a member of the saurolophine clade Kritosaurini, the first of the clade from Asia.

== Paleoecology ==
The type species Tanius sinensis was found in the Jiangjunding Formation of the Chinese Wangshi Group. The Jiangjunding formation consists purpley-grey or reddy-brown sandstones or various consistencies, siltstones and conglomerates. The Wangshi group of geologic formations is generally considered to be from the Late Cretaceous, although some regions are older. Based on the discovery of Pinacosaurus, only known elsewhere in the Djadokhta Formation or regions of the same age, the Wangshi Group was presumed to be a similar age of 75-71 million years old. The specific age for the Hongtuya Formation has been identified as 73.5-72.9 mya. As the Hongtuya is directly older than the Jiangjunding, it was identified that Tanius sinensis lived in the latest Campanian to earliest Maastrichtian by Borinder in 2015.

The Jiangjunding Formation was deposited in a fluvial to lacustrine environment. The climate was warm and humid during the majority of the timespan, although it was beginning to dry out after the Jiangjunding. Taxa that lived alongside Tanius in the formation include the ankylosaur Pinacosaurus cf. grangeri; possibly the cerapodan Micropachycephalosaurus; intermediate sauropods; intermediate coelurosaurs; and intermediate cheloniids which show similarities to Nanhsiungchelyidae. Multiple localities of dinosaur eggs have also been identified.

Both T. chingkankouensis and T. laiyangensis were discovered in the Jingangkou Formation, which is directly above the Jiangjunding. This formation has been the site of massive excavations of hadrosaurs in both the 1950s and the 2010s. A majority of the strata is green-grey mudstone, where the bones excavated are coloured black. The sediment in the location of the hadrosaur excavations was deposited by a mudflow event, where the carcasses were trapped and moved a short distance before rapid burial. At least 20 individuals of hadrosaurs have been uncovered, of various ages. Hadrosaurs from these localities include Tanius, Tsintaosaurus, Laiyangosaurus and Shantungosaurus. Other taxa uncovered include the theropods Chingkankousaurus and cf. Szechuanosaurus campi, and the testudine Glyptops.

== See also ==
- Timeline of hadrosaur research
