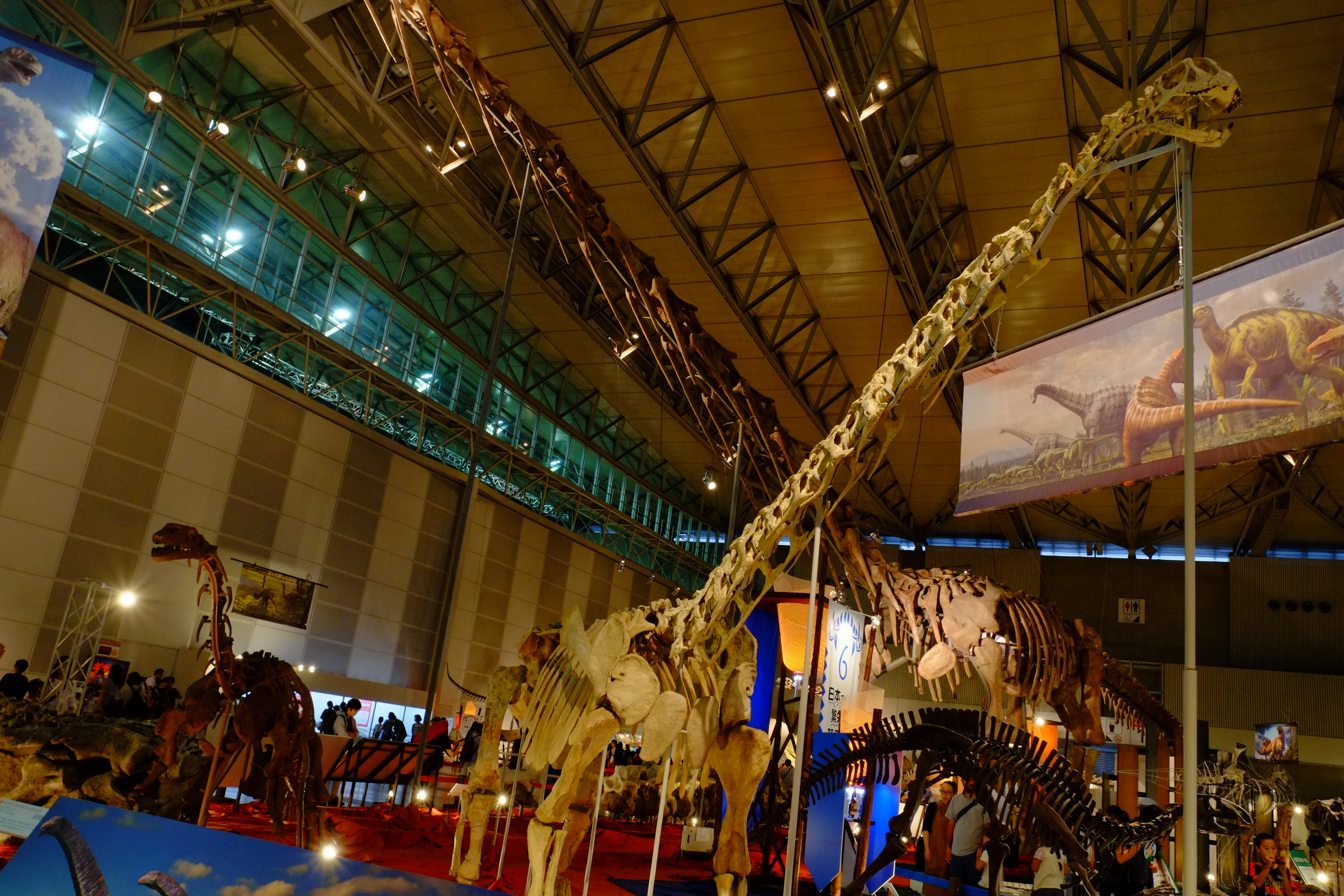
- Reconstructed skeleton in Japan

Scientific classification
- Kingdom: Animalia
- Phylum: Chordata
- Class: Reptilia
- Clade: Dinosauria
- Clade: Saurischia
- Clade: †Sauropodomorpha
- Clade: †Sauropoda
- Clade: †Macronaria
- Clade: †Titanosauriformes
- Clade: †Somphospondyli
- Family: †Euhelopodidae
- Genus: †Euhelopus; Romer, 1956

Type species
- †Euhelopus zdanskyi (Wiman, 1929)

Synonyms
- Helopus Wiman, 1929 (preoccupied)

= Euhelopus =

Euhelopus Temporal range: Berriasian-Valanginian ~143.1–133 Ma

Extinct genus of dinosaurs

Euhelopus is a genus of sauropod dinosaur that lived between 143 and 133 million years ago during the Berriasian and Valanginian ages of the Early Cretaceous in what is now Shandong Province in China. It was a large quadrupedal herbivore. Like sauropods such as brachiosaurids and titanosaurs, Euhelopus had longer forelimbs than hindlimbs. This discovery was paleontologically significant because it represented the first dinosaur scientifically investigated from China: seen in 1913, rediscovered in 1922, excavated in 1923, and studied by T'an during the same year. Unlike most sauropod specimens, it has a relatively complete skull. Euhelopus was a long-necked sauropod similar to Mamenchisaurus, but its affinities are controversial. Most studies favor a close relationship between Euhelopus and titanosaurs, rather than mamenchisaurids.

== Description ==
Size comparison

=== Size ===
Since its original description, Euhelopus has often been considered a rather large sauropod. It has been thought to weigh about 15–20 tonnes (17–22 short tons) and attain an adult length of 15 metres (49 ft). Later estimates have downsized this considerably. In 2016, Gregory S. Paul estimated the weight at 3.5 tonnes (3.9 short tons) and the body length at 11 metres (36 ft). Benson et al. estimated its mass at 5.9 tonnes (6.5 short tons), whereas Larramendi et al. estimated it at 3.6 tonnes (4.0 short tons).

=== Overall anatomy ===
Euhelopus was a relatively long-necked sauropod, with a 4-meter neck composed of 17 cervical vertebrae. (Note: The position of the cervicodorsal transition in Euhelopus is uncertain, and it is possible that the 18th vertebra in the series should also be considered as part of the neck.) The presacral vertebrae had a camellate pneumatic structure, made of many small pneumatic chambers, as is characteristic of titanosauriforms and some mamenchisaurids. Pneumatic chambers even extended into the ilium, as occurs in many titanosaurs. The humerus was apparently nearly as long as the femur, although there is some uncertainty in this ratio, as it is not certain that the humerus and femur from which this ratio was calculated belong to the same individual, and the femur in question is incomplete.

=== Distinguishing anatomical features ===
The original diagnosis by Wiman is outdated. A diagnosis is a statement of the anatomical features of an organism (or group) that collectively distinguish it from all other organisms. Some of the features in a diagnosis may be autapomorphies. An autapomorphy is a distinctive anatomical feature that is unique to an organism or group.

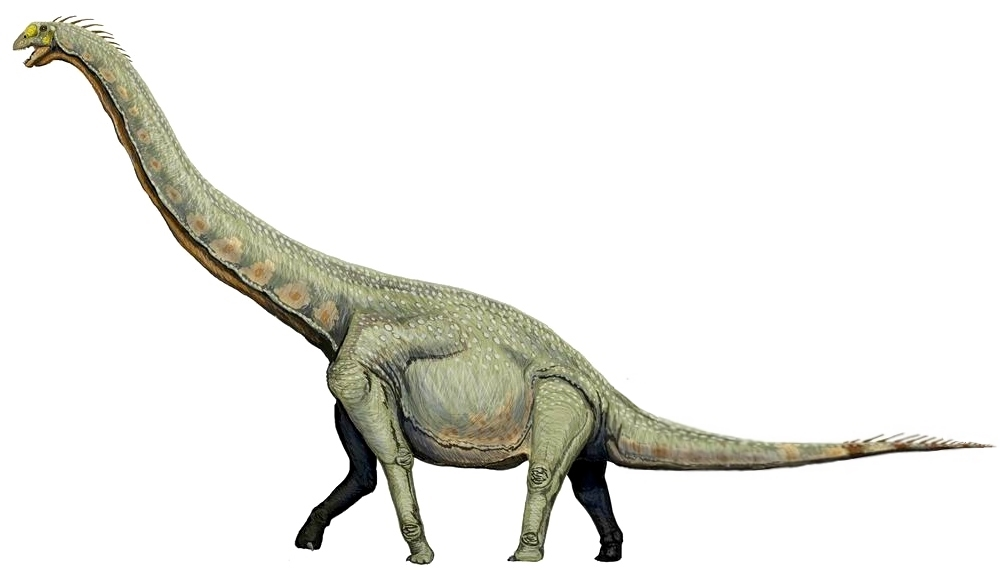
Restoration

According to a study by Jeffrey A. Wilson and Paul Upchurch in 2009, Euhelopus can be distinguished based on, among others, these autapomorphies:

- The teeth are inclined to the front as proven by the edge of the enamel at the front of the tooth running more in the direction of the top and a front buttress also located more closely to the top.
- The axis, the second neck vertebra, has a hollow at the rear of its neural spine, with three deeper pneumatic depressions in it.
- The postaxial cervical vertebrae, the neck vertebrae behind the axis, have variably developed epipophyses and more subtle "pre‐epipopophyses" below the prezygapophyses, projections on the front of the ridge between the prezygapophysis and the vertebral body.
- The cervical neural arches have an epipophyseal‐prezygapophyseal lamina, a horizontal ridge running from the epipophysis to the prezygapophysis, separating two pneumatocoels by dividing the usual depression at the side base of the neural spine.
- In the neck vertebrae the pleurocoels are reduced to foramina, smaller openings.
- In the neck vertebrae the neural spines are reduced in height and length.
- The third neck vertebra has a neural spine with a transversely flattened forwardly directed process.
- The anterior cervical vertebrae have three costal spurs between the tuberculum and capitulum, the heads of their ribs.
- The neck rib shafts are strongly positioned below the vertebral body due to an appending parapophysis and a long section between the two rib heads.
- The middle presacral neural spines, of the rear neck and front back, are divided or forked, and in the neck base and anterior dorsal vertebrae bear a median tubercle that is at least as large as the metapophyses, the prongs of the fork, resulting in a "trifid" condition.
- The middle and posterior dorsal parapophyseal and diapophyseal laminae are arranged in a "K" configuration.
- The presacral pneumaticity extends into the ilium, which thus is permeated by air chambers.

== Discovery and naming ==
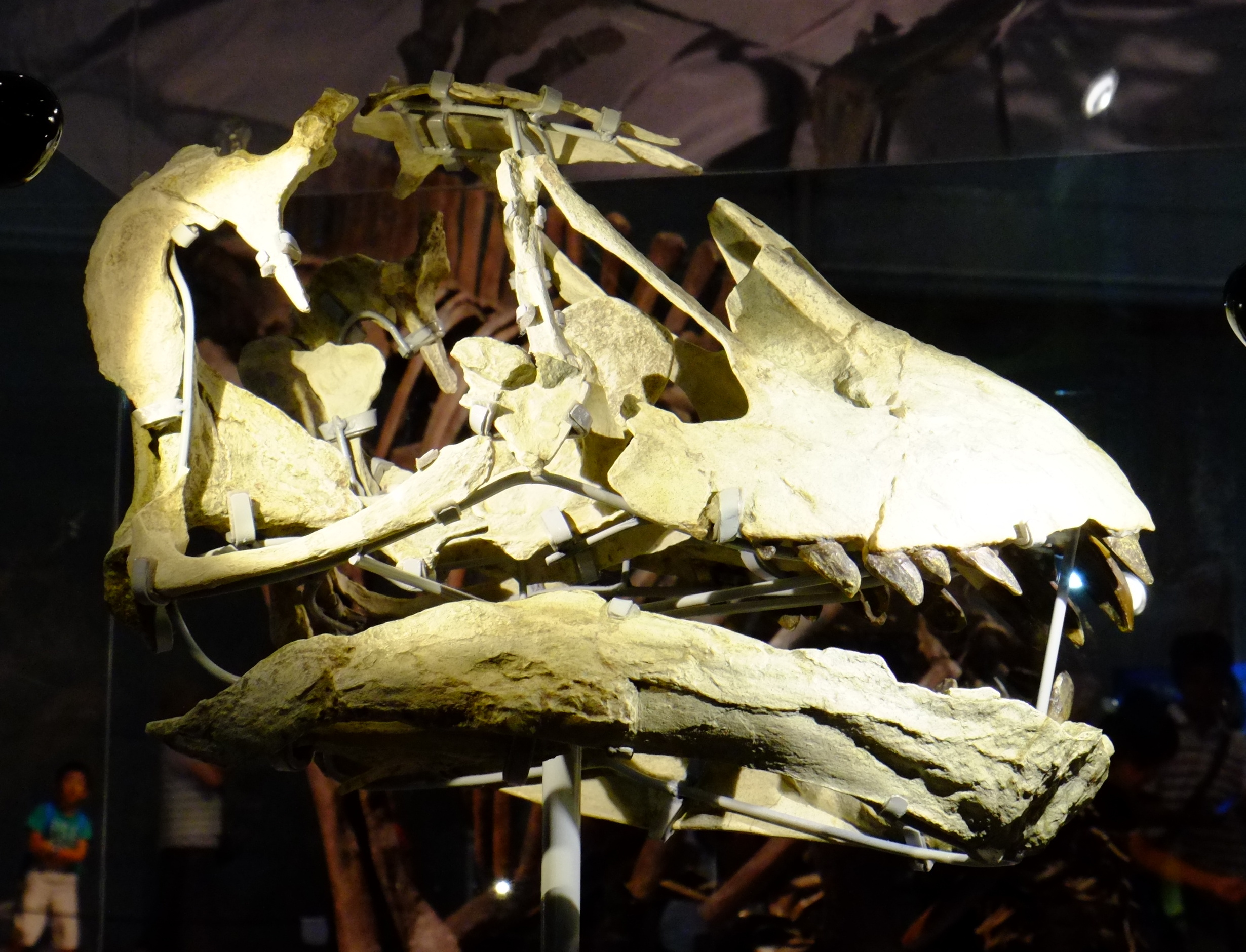
Cast of the holotype skull on display in Japan

The original discovery was by a Catholic priest, Father R. Mertens, in 1913. He showed some remains he had excavated to the German mining engineer Gustav Behaghel who in 1916 sent three vertebrae to the head of the Geological Survey of China Ding Wenjiang ("V.K. Ting"). This was probably the first occasion dinosaur bones from China were scientifically studied. With help of another Catholic priest, Father Alfred Kaschel, the site was rediscovered in November 1922 by Johan Gunnar Andersson and Tan Xichou. In March 1923, the Austrian student Otto Zdansky excavated two skeletons at sites about three kilometres apart and the holotype was studied by H. C. T'an, also in 1923.

It was originally described and named Helopus, meaning "Marsh Foot", by the Swedish paleontologist Carl Wiman in 1929, after the Greek ἕλος, helos, "swamp", and πούς, pous, "foot". The name refers to the marshy area of the finds and to truga, Swedish swamp shoes, which according to Wiman resembled the wide feet of the animal. This name however, already belonged to a bird because the Caspian tern had once been named Helopus caspius Wagler 1832. The sauropod dinosaur was therefore renamed Euhelopus (True marsh-foot) in 1956 by Alfred Sherwood Romer. There proved to be a plant genus (a grass) with the same generic name, Euhelopus. However, a genus in one biological kingdom may have a name that is used as a genus name in another kingdom, so Euhelopus was allowed. The type species is Helopus zdanskyi. The combinatio nova is Euhelopus zdanskyi. The specific name honours Zdansky.

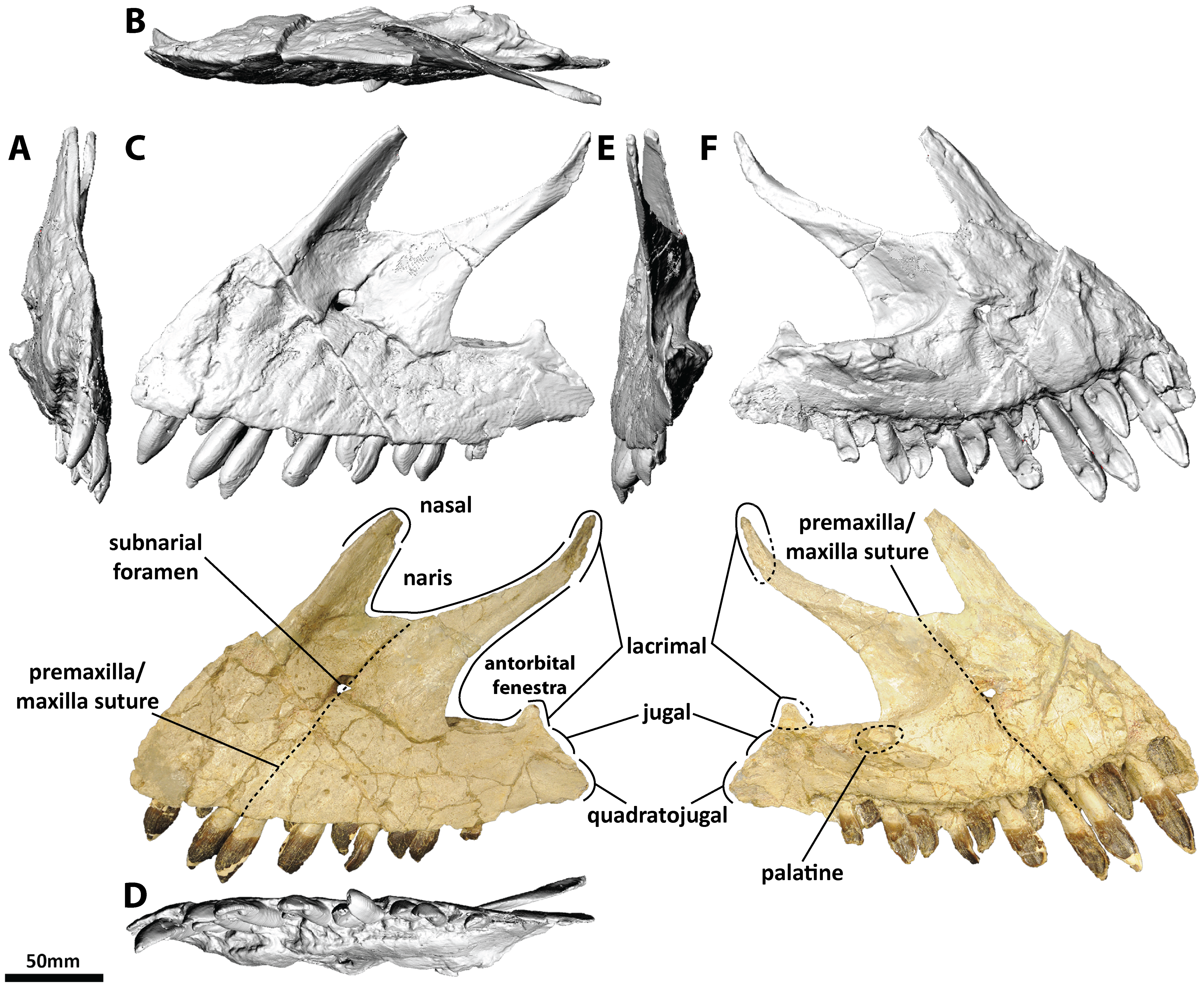
Left premaxilla and maxilla

Specimen PMU 24705 (formerly PMU R233) forms according to Wilson & Upchurch the holotype, descriptive basis, for the species Euhelopus zdanskyi. It represents one of the skeletons found by Zdansky, named "Exemplar a" by Wiman, who did not formally assign a holotype. This is the original skeleton found by Mertens. Specimen PMU 24705 consists of a partial skeleton with skull and lower jaws comprising these bones: the rostral part of the left nasal; a partial right jugal; the tapered jugal process of the postorbital, partially excavated; the dorsal process of the right quadratojugal; the fragmented left pterygoid (another fragment might be the right splenial, but it is too fragile to be removed from its matrix), a series of twenty-five presacral vertebrae and the left thighbone.

The second skeleton, of an individual about as large as the holotype, was designated "Exemplar b" by Wiman. It was by Wilson & Upchurch referred to Euhelopus. This specimen PMU 24706, formerly PMU 234, comprises nine articulated dorsal vertebrae and the sacrum, two dorsal ribs, a nearly complete pelvis, and a right hindlimb lacking the fifth metatarsal and several pedal phalanges.

Both specimens are housed in the collection of the Paleontological Museum of Uppsala University, in Uppsala, Sweden, where the mounted skeletons are displayed since the 1930s.

In 1923, Zdansky lacked the time to finish the excavation of the holotype. In the autumn of 1934, C. C. Young and M. N. Bien returned to the locality and recovered a left scapulocoracoid, right coracoid and right humerus. Young described these remains, as well as the vertebrae Behagel had sent to Ting, in 1935. Young assigned all of these remains to Euhelopus zdanskyi except the incomplete right coracoid, and suggested that they probably belonged to the type specimen. Yang and Bien's scapulocoracoid and humerus and Ting's vertebrae were designated "exemplar c" by Wilson & Upchurch in 2009. They were informed in 2007 that this material could no longer be located in the Chinese collections.

== Classification ==
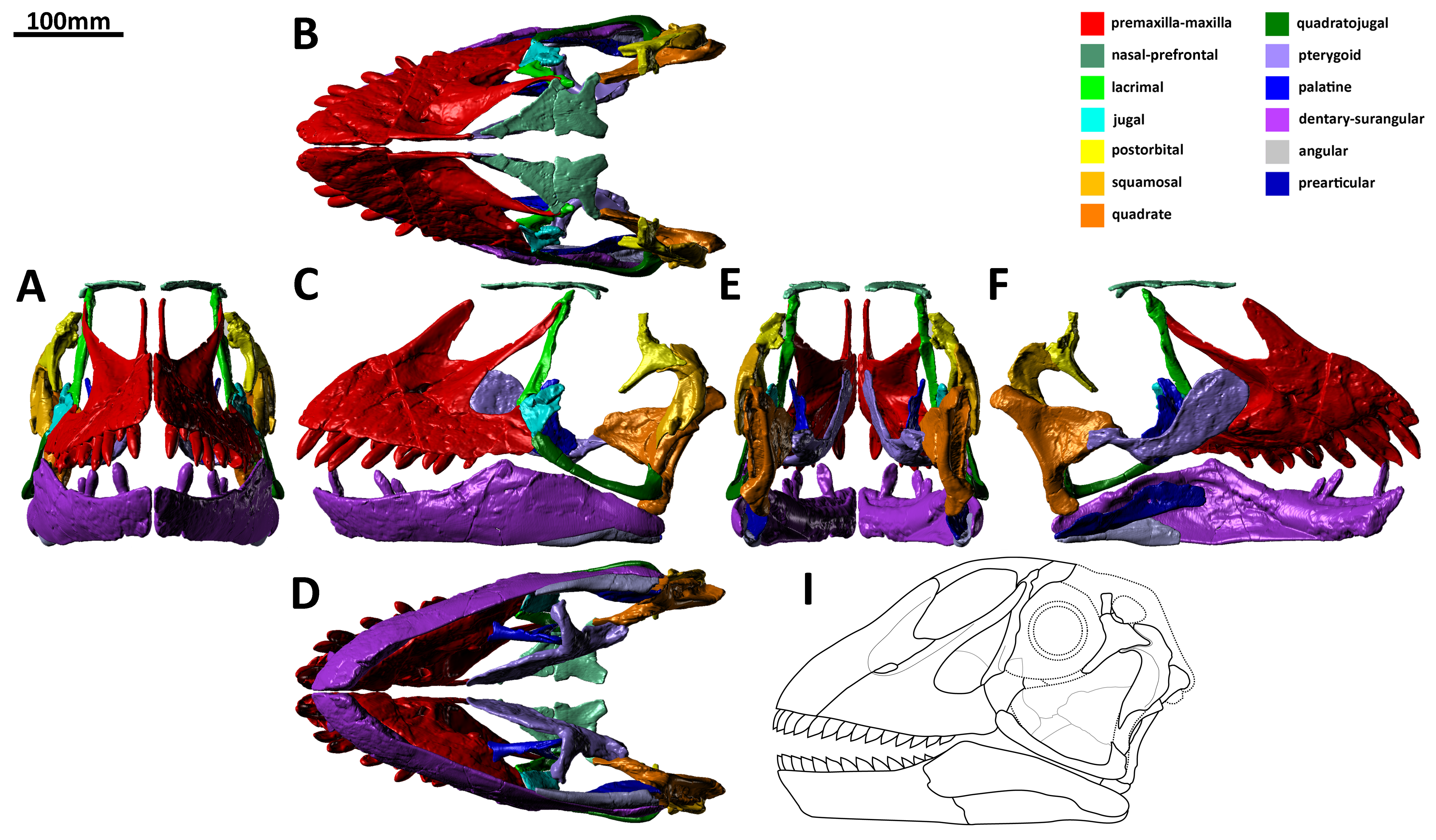
Reconstructions of the skull

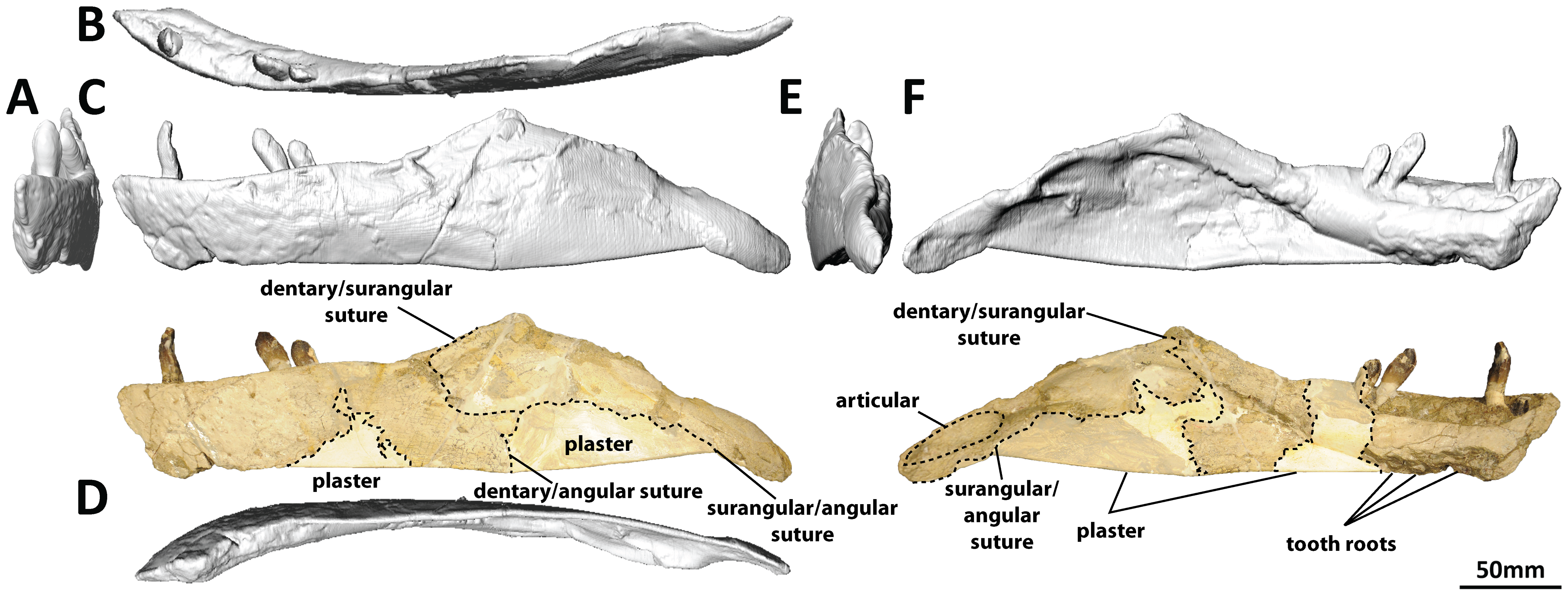
Left dentary and surangular bones

Wiman in 1929 was uncertain about the affinities of Helopus and placed it in a Helopodidae of its own. Yang made this a Helopodinae, first within the Morosauridae, then within the Brachiosauridae. Romer in 1956 created a Euhelopodinae. In 1990, John Stanton McIntosh placed Euhelopus in the Camarasauridae.

The phylogenetic affinities of Euhelopus are controversial, and it has been variously interpreted as having close affinities to Mamenchisaurus-like taxa or as being grouped together with titanosaurs in the clade Somphospondyli. The clade containing Euhelopus and its close relatives is known as Euhelopodidae, but the ambiguity over Euhelopus's affinities has caused considerable uncertainty regarding the membership of Euhelopodidae. Most studies favor the somphospondyl hypothesis for Euhelopus, but the lack of research on the anatomy of Mamenchisaurus-like sauropods has inhibited a rigorous test of the relationship between them and Euhelopus.

Wilson and Upchurch (2009) noted that cladistic assessments suggest that Euhelopus belonged to a clade of sauropods, the Euhelopodidae, that originated during an interval of geographic isolation and was endemic to this geographical range in China. It is not clear if the Euhelopodidae are monophyletic. Euhelopus demonstrates phylogenetic affinity to the taxon Titanosauria. Traditional claims that Euhelopus, Omeisaurus, Mamenchisaurus and Shunosaurus form the monophyletic family "Euhelopodidae" are not supported by new phylogenetic analysis. The cladogram below follows José L. Carballido, Oliver W. M. Rauhut, Diego Pol and Leonardo Salgado (2011).

- Camarasauromorpha
  - Camarasaurus
  - - Europasaurus
    - - - Galvesaurus
        - Tehuelchesaurus
      - - - Janenschia
          - Tastavinsaurus
        - - Euhelopus
          - - - Chubutisaurus
              - Wintonotitan
            - Titanosauriformes
              - Brachiosauridae
              - - Phuwiangosaurus
                - Titanosauria

== Paleoecology ==
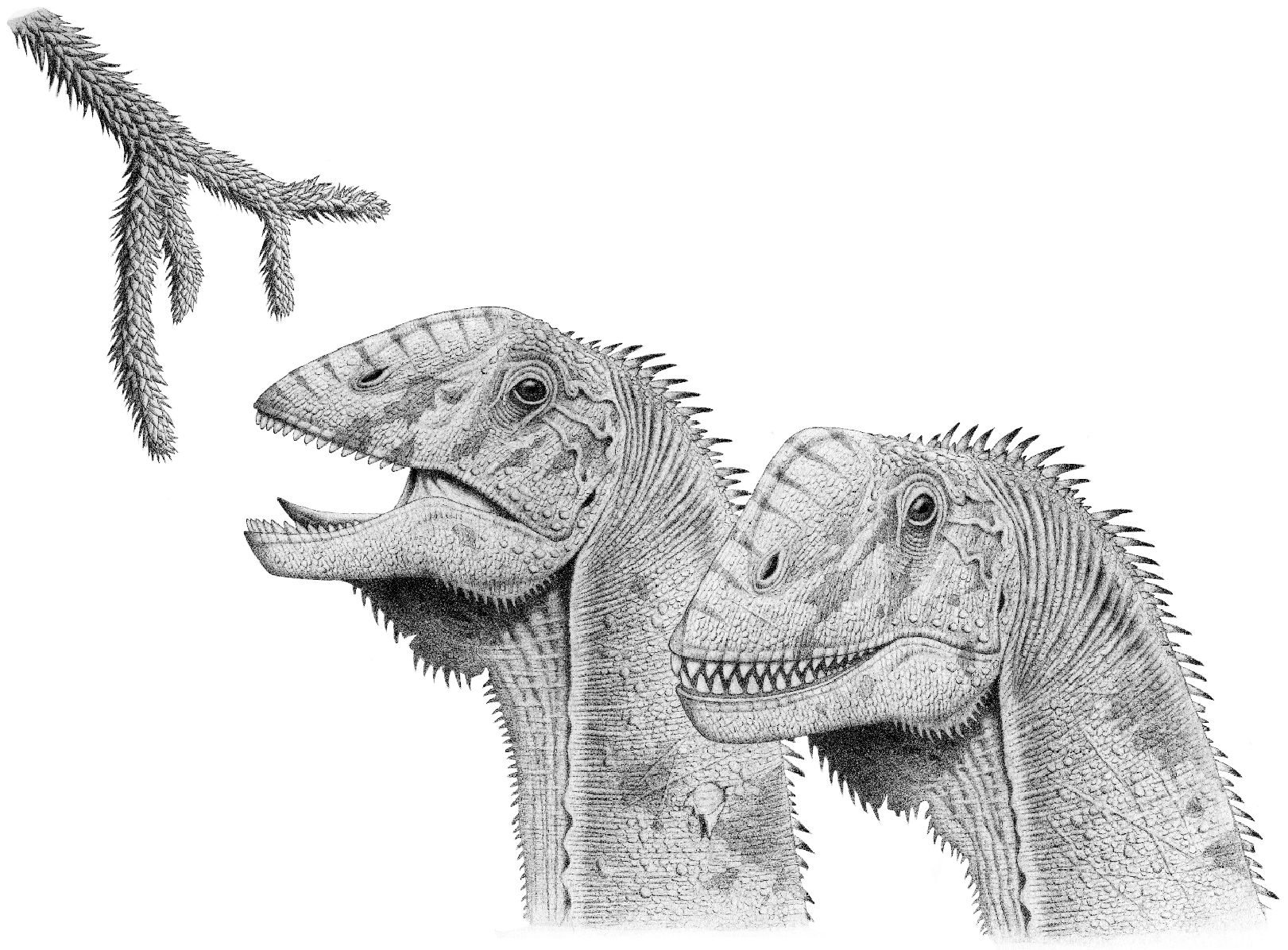
Restorations of the head

=== Provenance and occurrence ===
The type material for Euhelopus was excavated at the Mengyin Formation in Shandong (Shantung) Province, China. The specimens were collected by Otto Zdansky in 1923, in green/yellow sandstone and green/yellow siltstone.

The Mengyin Formation dates to the Berriasian-Valanginian. It was previously regarded as having been deposited during the Barremian or Aptian stages of the Cretaceous period, about 129 to 113 million years ago. During the 1990s it was mistakenly thought the formation might date from the Late Jurassic.
