= Endeavor Weekly =

- Founder(s): Ding Wenjiang, Hu Shih, Cai Yuanpei and others
- Founded: May 7, 1922
- Ceased publication: October 31, 1923
- Political alignment: Liberalism
- Headquarters: Beijing
- OCLC number: 1184524064

The Endeavor Weekly (also spelled Endeavour Weekly; simplified Chinese: 努力周报; traditional Chinese: 努力週報), or Effort Weekly, Working Hard Weekly, was a Beijing-based influential liberal magazine, founded on May 7, 1922, and finalized on October 31, 1923, with a total of 75 issues. The magazine was published by the Shanghai Commercial Press and was distinctly political.

On May 7, 1922, Hu Shih composed Song of Endeavor, which was the inaugural words of Endeavor Weekly.

In September 1922, Hu Shih published an article entitled Self-Government in the Federated Provinces and Warlord Partition in Endeavor Weekly, distinguishing the constructive self-government movement from the destructive warlordism and proposing the program of building "the federation of provincial self-governments".
