= Carl Wiman =

Swedish palaeontologist

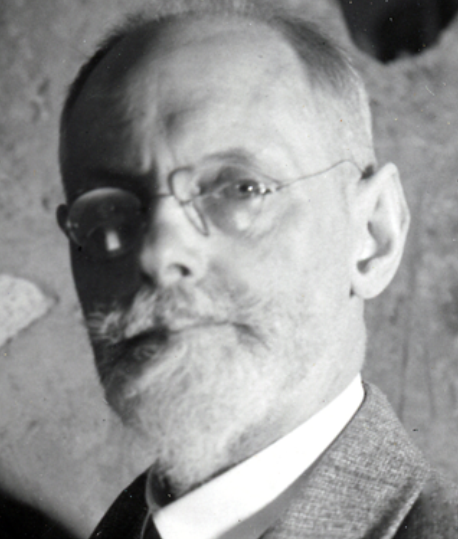
- Carl Wiman in 1937, aged 70
- Born: Carl Johan Josef Ernst Wiman; 10 March 1867; Stockholm, Sweden
- Died: 15 June 1944 (aged 77); Uppsala, Sweden
- Resting place: Uppsala gamla kyrkogård
- Education: Uppsala University
- Scientific career
- Fields: Palaeontology; Historical geology
- Workplaces: Uppsala University; Museum of Evolution, Uppsala; Geological Survey of Sweden
- Thesis: Über die Graptoliten (1895)
- Doctoral advisor: Arvid Högbom

Carl Johan Josef Ernst Wiman (March 10, 1867 – June 15, 1944) was a Swedish palaeontologist, the first professor of palaeontology and historical geology at Uppsala University, and the father of Swedish vertebrate palaeontology.

Wiman was instrumental in the construction of the Palaeontological Museum of Uppsala University (now part of the Museum of Evolution), which contains the largest collection of Chinese fossil vertebrate material outside China.

He is responsible for naming the genera Helopus (renamed Euhelopus because Helopus was already in use) and Tanius, and the species Pentaceratops fenestratus and Parasaurolophus tubicen. He was also the first to suggest that the hollow cranial crests of lambeosaurine duckbill dinosaurs could be used as a horn-like noisemaker.

== Early life ==
=== Family ===
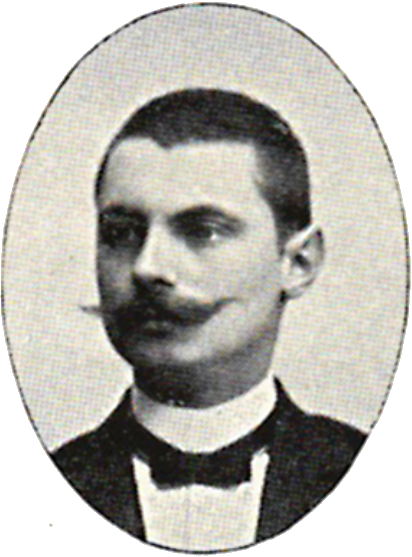
Photograph of a 23-year-old Carl Wiman, 1890.

Wiman was born on 10 March 1867 in the recently inaugurated Märsta railway station, located on Husby-Odensala, Stockholm. Wiman's father was a Swedish army captain and Märsta's station-master between 1866 and 1879. Wiman's mother was from Aachen, the daughter of a wealthy Catholic pharmaceutical chemist.

Wiman's childhood was spent accompanying his father on excursions in Uppsala, an amateur naturalist who was also considered to have been a keen hunter. Through these, he gained an interest in all aspects of nature, and performed extensive observations of plants and animals, such as collecting insects. His enjoyment for geology was most likely influenced by visits to his mother's home, where he came upon outcrops of cretaceous chalk that correspond to the Maastricht Formation. In 1885, aged 18, he was introduced to the study of palaeontology by a maternal uncle, a hotel proprietor in Valkenburg who was an amateur geologist and palaeontologist.

=== Education ===
In 1888 the 21-year-old Wiman began his studies at Uppsala University and in 1895 obtained his PhD degree with the thesis "Über die Graptoliten" (On Graptolites).

== Career ==
=== Uppsala University ===
He began his scientific career in 1891 under Arvid Högbom, centered around Jämtland and other Cambrian-Silurian underwater fossiliferous districts that were of interest but difficult to access. During this time Wiman also refined the method of freeing fossils by dissolving the matrix in hydrochloric or hydrofluoric acid, which helped advance the field of graptolite zoology.

Around 1892 Wiman was made curator of the palaeontological collections present in the Geological Institute.

In 1896 Wiman was made lecturer of palaeontology and pre-Quaternary historical geology by his PhD advisor, now professor, Arvid Högbom, who preferred to devote his time to other scientific endeavors. Nevertheless, Högbom constantly sought for Wiman's success, and actively promoted the project of an independent professorship in palaeontology and historical geology. This would later prove successful, with Wiman's obtaining a personal professorship in 1911, and finally a chaired professorship in 1922.

=== Vertebrate palaeontology ===
Wiman's fascination for vertebrate palaeontology began when he described fossil Eocene penguins and other birds found during the first Swedish Antarctic expedition of 1901-03. In 1908 he found in Spitsbergen, Svalbard, what he considered to be his most important discovery, a rich fossiliferous horizon, later known as the "Fish Horizon". It was important in the sense that it triggered a number of successful Swedish expeditions that focused on finding vertebrate fossils, resulting in the collection of several fish, marine reptile (majorly Ichthyosaurs), and Temnospondyli fossils, ultimately leading to the foundation of the Palaeontological Institute in Uppsala and the elevation of Swedish vertebrate palaeontology into the international limelight.

In order to compare the Spitsbergen vertebrate fossils, Wiman purchased or collected fossils from Besano (Switzerland), Peterborough (England), and Holzmaden (Germany). Among the best of these specimens was a young Ichthyosaur with evidences of its soft parts preserved. In virtue of generous Swedish donors, Wiman's collection of reptilian fossils grew, and slowly became his principal field of interest. For example, he devoted much time and money to the Pterosauria and published several papers about that group. He was especially interested in the biological side of that subject and tried to elucidate the life of pterosaurs by studies on living Chiroptera (bats). Such experiments involved making them swim in warm water, for, as he pointed out himself, he did not want to treat the animals in an unfriendly way.

Around 1920 Wiman's activity extended to foreign continents. Generous donations, in large part by the superintendent at the Royal Swedish Court, Axel Lagrelius, enabled Wiman to purchase and acquire a number of fine reptile specimens from Europe, North America, and from the famous American fossil hunter Charles Hazelius Sternberg, who made a special expedition to New Mexico for the Uppsala collections in 1921.

=== Sino-Swedish collaboration ===
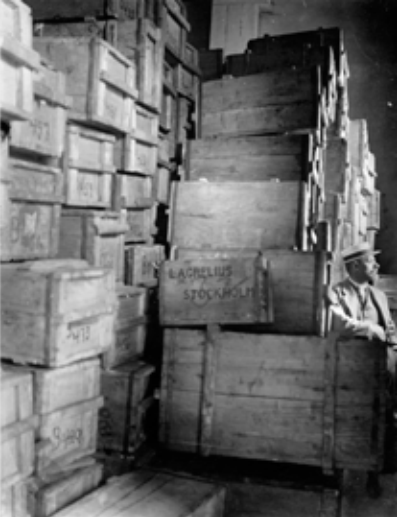
Carl Wiman and some of the 300 boxes of Chinese vertebrate fossil that arrived in Uppsala during the Summer of 1923.

Johan Gunnar Andersson, a prominent Swedish geologist and archaeologist, and Wiman's friend since early youth, was working in China in 1919. Hearing about this, Wiman obtained generous state grants, in large part because of his proximity to Lagrelius, which Wiman would use to fund several expeditions to China. The Chinese administration deliberately pursued the collaboration in order to be able to modernize and strengthen their national scientific infrastructure. Ding Wenjiang was the Chinese representative, and described that the material should stay in Uppsala, while as many duplicate specimens as possible should be repatriated to China after study.

Wiman sent a few of his students, namely Otto Zdansky, Birger Bohlin, Torsten J. Ringström and Erik Stensiö from Sweden, as well as non-Swedish scientists such as Max Schlosser and Arthur T. Hopwood. Collectively, between 1919 and 1923, they sent back to Uppsala 783 boxes of Chinese fossils. Some fossils of international interest were four teeth of Peking Man.

=== Palaeontological Museum ===
Back in Uppsala there were no single facilities that could hold the amount of material pouring in from China. The fossils were consequently stored in five facilities spread over the town.

A detailed proposal and budget was put forward in June 1926 to the administration of Uppsala University, urging for the construction of a new museum building. Wiman claimed that the fossil collections were on a par with those of the foremost museums in Europe, and therefore rightly deserved a proper museum building in which to house them. By influence of his friend Lagrelius, who discussed the matter with Crown Prince Gustaf VI Adolf, a memorandum was sent to the Prime Minister. The proposal was approved by the government in 1929, and 791 000 SEK were allocated to the construction of Carl Wiman's palaeontological museum. Unfortunately, the assigned budget made Wiman reduce the scope of his project, but still he enthusiastically hailed it in the press, calling it a "temple to the fossils". The museum finished construction in 1931.

== Later life ==
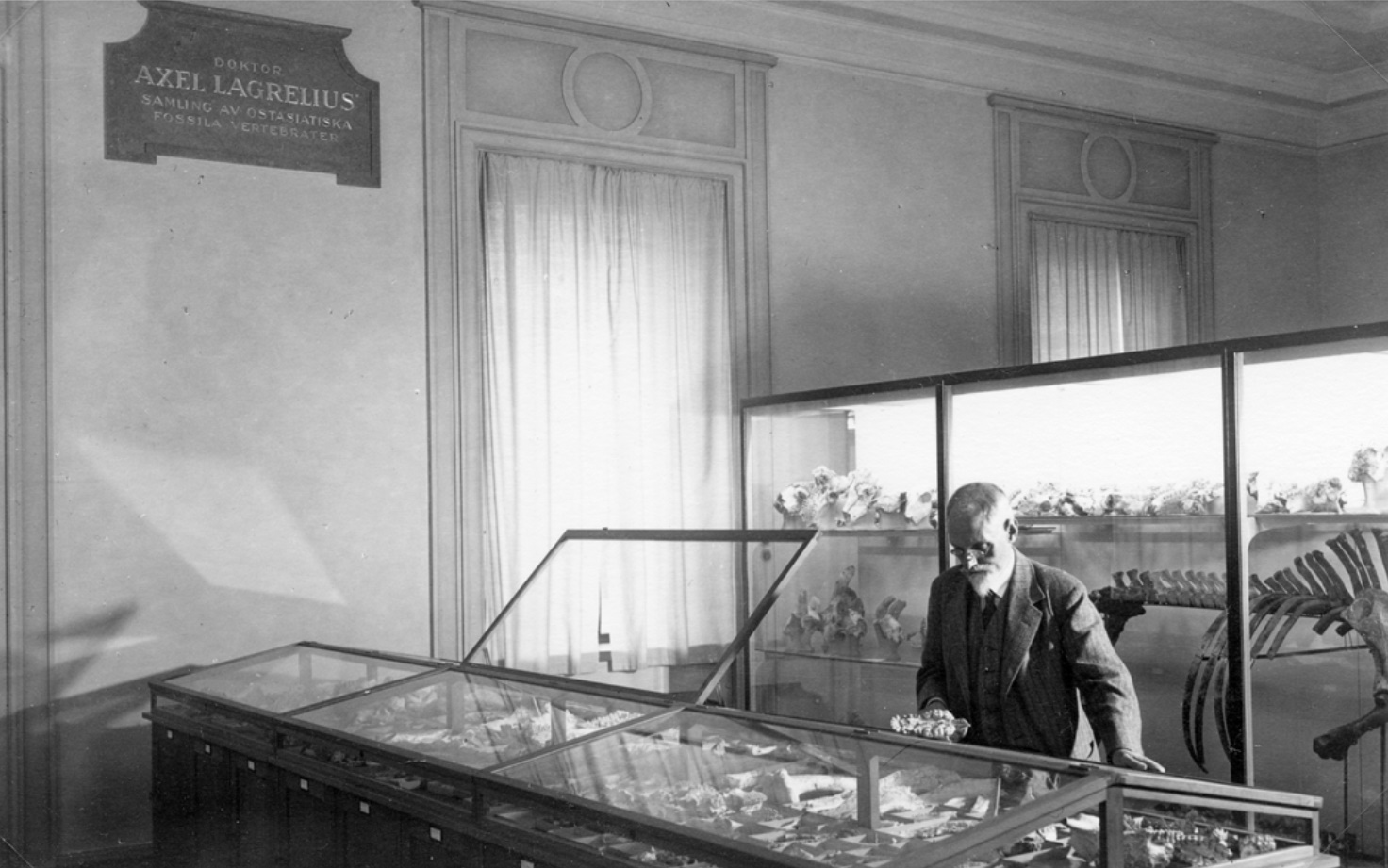
Carl Wiman studying Cenozoic mammals from the Lagrelius Collection, July 1938.

Wiman eventually retired from academic life one year after his museum's completion at age 65. During that time he oversaw the installation of the exhibits and the storing of all dispersed collections. Wiman would continue to work and supervise the running of the museum until a week before his death on 6 June 1944. Wiman's only female student, Elsa Warburg, the first female palaeontologist in Sweden, informally administered the institute in the interval immediately following Wiman’s death.
