= Museum of Evolution of Uppsala University =

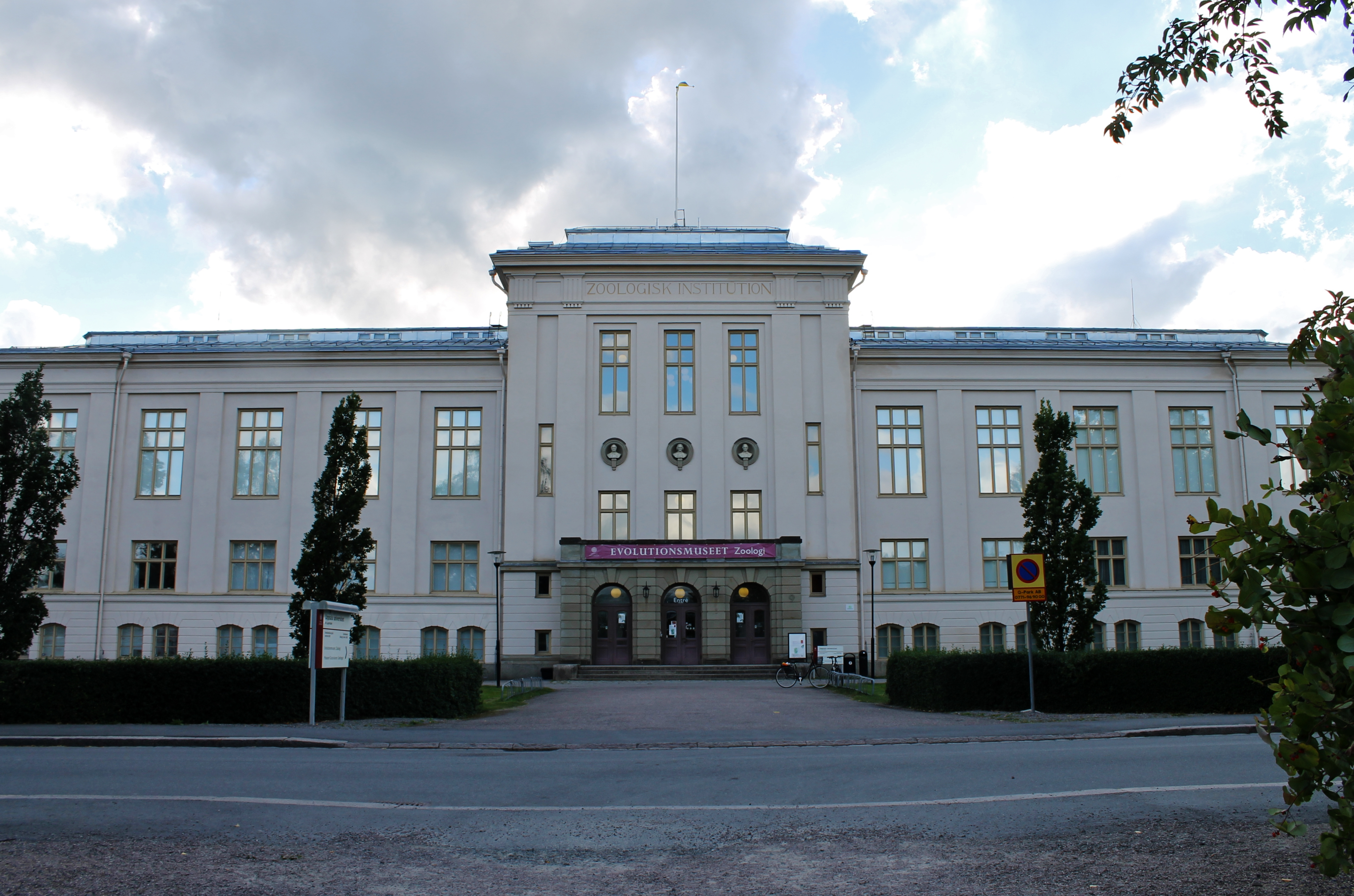
- Established: 1999
- Location: Norbyvägen 16, Norbyvägen 22, Villavägen 9, Uppsala, Sweden
- Coordinates: 59°51′00″N 17°37′33″E
- Type: Natural history museum
- Website: http://www.evolutionsmuseet.uu.se

The Museum of Evolution of Uppsala University (Swedish: Evolutionsmuseet) is a natural history museum in Sweden, and holds Scandinavia's largest fossil collection of dinosaurs. The number of items in today's collection, which spans zoological, paleontological and mineralogical specimens, is approximately 5 million unique pieces, of which only a fraction are exhibited. Expeditions to China in the 20th century unearthed numerous unique paleontological treasures. The museum's collection contains three teeth of the Peking Man, found by paleontologist Otto Zdansky during an expedition to Zhoukoudian in 1921. Due to its large collection of type specimens the museum is an important establishment in the field of biological systematics, and it maintains an active exchange with other scientific institutions worldwide.

== History ==
Despite being formally founded in 1999, the museum traces its history back to the 17th century. During this time upstanding university members like Carl Linnaeus, Olof Celsius and Jonas Alströmer donated collections of material to the museum. In the 20th century, notable paleontologists Otto Zdansky and professor Carl Wiman contributed to the growth of the collections. Several expeditions to China yielded many unique vertebrate fossils. From 1917 and onwards the zoological collections of the museum were stored and displayed in a building designed by the architects Ture Stenberg and Victor Holmgren. Before the 1930s, the paleontological collections of the museum were disorganized and spread out in a number of buildings across the city. Wiman, who was the first professor of paleontology at Uppsala University, had powerful connections and managed to bring about the construction of a single large building in which all the paleontological and mineralogical specimens could be stored. The architect was Axel Anderberg and the building was given a vaguely Chinese style in recognition of the Chinese origins of many of the museum's dinosaur specimens. Construction was completed in 1931 and since then the building has served both as a museum and as a classroom for paleontology students.

== Organisation ==
The Museum of Evolution consists of a paleontological, a botanical and a zoological section, all located on the grounds of the Evolutionary Biology Centre of Uppsala University. Each section has its own building with a display hall.

== Botanical section ==
The Botanical section of the museum is not open to the public, but researchers and other visitors may access the collections after making an appointment with the museum. More than three million plant specimens are housed in its herbarium. Of these, 620,000 have been digitized and are available online.

== Paleontological section ==
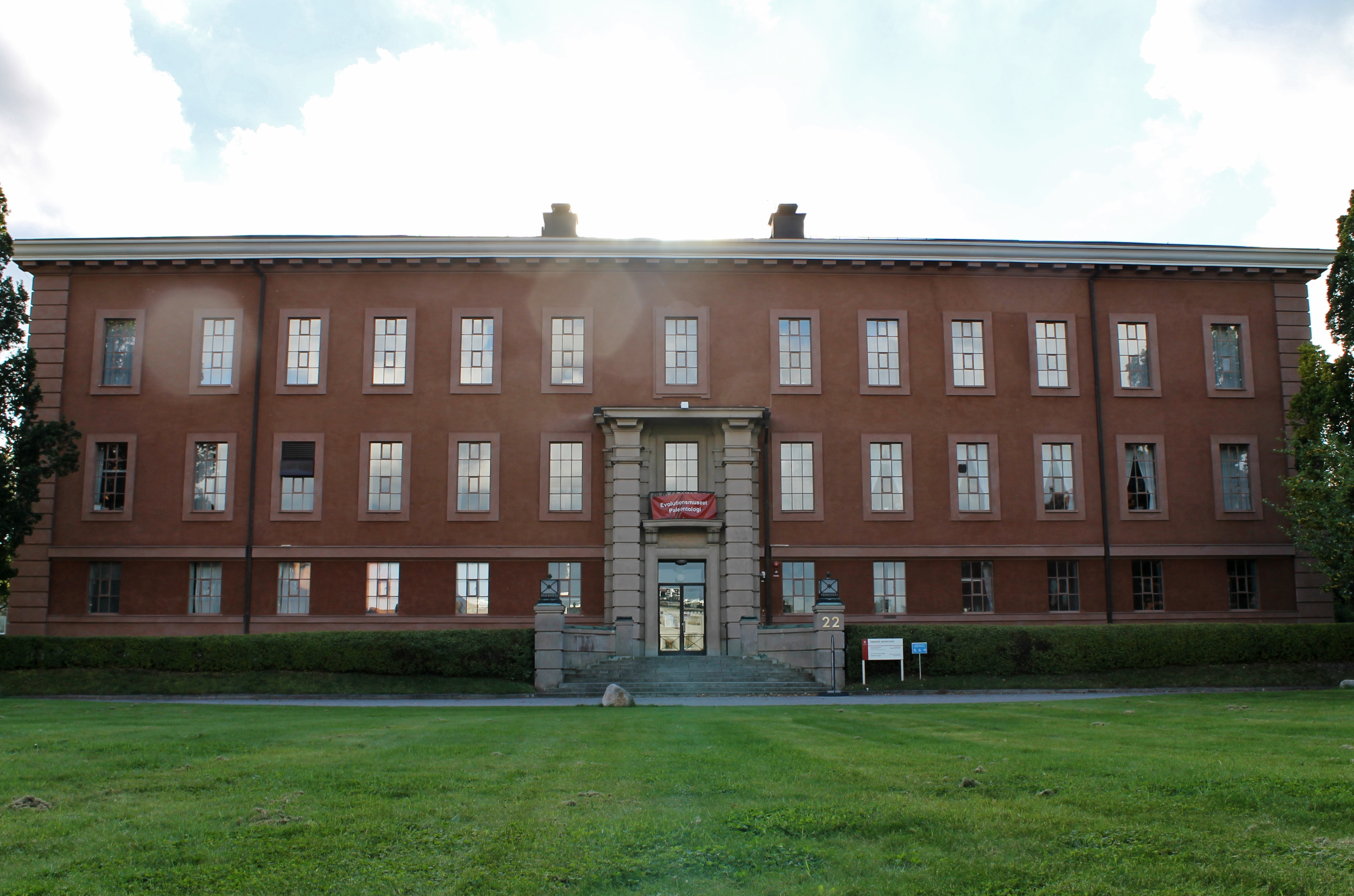
The Paleontological section of the museum as seen from the campus of the Evolutionary Biology Centre.

The paleontological section of the museum holds many mesozoic fossils of marine reptiles, such as the ichthyosaur Ophthalmosaurus and the mosasaur Platecarpus. There are several original fossils of pterosaurs and dinosaurs. These include a unique specimen of the Chinese sauropod Euhelopus zdanskyi and a cast of the Berlin specimen of Archaeopteryx lithographica, as well as the ceratopsid dinosaur Pentaceratops sternbergi and a skull of the hadrosaurid Parasaurolophus tubicen, the two latter genera both named by Wiman. The section contains a large collection of fossil mammalian specimens, as well as mounted skeletons of contemporary cetaceans and the fossilised mandible of an Eocene mysticete. There are also numerous fossils of invertebrates, such as trilobites, cephalopods, bivalve molluscs and corals. The mineral room contains a collection of both common and rare minerals from around the world, including zircon and malachite.

== Zoological section ==
The Zoological section of the museum chiefly contains taxidermied animals from the modern era, and from various parts of the world. Some items from the zoological collection are available online.
