= Jiangjunding Formation =

Geological formation in n Shandong, China

- Stratigraphic range: Campanian-Maastrichtian; ~72.9–68.5 Ma
- Type: Group
- Unit of: Wangshi Group
- Underlies: Jingangkou Formation
- Overlies: Hongtuya Formation

Lithology
- Primary: Conglomerate, sandstone, siltstone
- Other: Marl

Location
- Coordinates: 36.9°N 120.7°E
- Approximate paleocoordinates: 37.3°N 111.0°E
- Region: Shandong
- Country: China
- Jiangjunding Formation (China) Jiangjunding Formation (Shandong)

The Jiangjunding Formation is a geological formation in Shandong, China whose strata date back to the Campanian-Maastrichtian stages of the Late Cretaceous. Dinosaur remains are among the fossils that have been recovered from the group.

The Jiangjunding formation consists purpley-grey or reddy-brown sandstones or various consistencies, siltstones and conglomerates. The Jiangjunding Formation was deposited in a fluvial to lacustrine environment. The climate was warm and humid during the majority of the timespan, although it was beginning to dry out after the Jiangjunding.

== Fossil content ==
Dinosaur eggs are known from this formation.

Color key: Taxon / Reclassified taxon / Taxon falsely reported as present / Dubious taxon or junior synonym / Ichnotaxon / Ootaxon / Morphotaxon	Notes; Uncertain or tentative taxa are in small text; ~~crossed out~~ taxa are discredited.

=== Dinosaurs ===
==== Ornithischians ====
Ornithischians of the Jiangjunding Formation
Genus	Species	Location	Stratigraphic position	Material	Notes	Image
Micropachycephalosaurus	M. hongtuyanensis	Shandong Province, China	Campanian	"Partial mandible, associated postcranial fragments".	A marginocephalian ornithischian	
Pinacosaurus	P. cf. grangeri	Shandong Province, China	Campanian		A ankylosaurine ankylosaurid	
Shantungosaurus	S. giganteus	Shandong Province, China	Campanian to Maastrichtian		A giant edmontosaurin saurolophine	
Tanius	T. sinensis	Shandong Province, China	Campanian		A hadrosauromorph hadrosauroid	

==== Sauropods ====
Sauropods of the Jiangjunding Formation
Genus	Species	Location	Stratigraphic position	Material	Notes	Image
Sauropoda indet.	Indeterminate	Shandong Province, China	Campanian to Maastrichtian		An indeterminate sauropod.	

==== Theropods ====
Theropods of the Jiangjunding Formation
Genus	Species	Location	Stratigraphic position	Material	Notes	Image
Coelurosauria indet.	Indeterminate	Shandong Province, China	Campanian to Maastrichtian		A coelurosaurian theropod	

=== Turtles ===
Turtles of the Jiangjunding Formation
Genus	Species	Location	Stratigraphic position	Material	Notes	Image
Cheloniidae Indet.	Indeterminate	Shandong Province, China	Campanian to Maastrichtian		A cheloniid turtle; which show similatiers to Nanhsiungchelyidae.	

=== Oofossils ===
Oofossils of the Jiangjunding Formation
Genus	Species	Location	Stratigraphic position	Material	Notes	Image
Laiyangoolithus	L. lixiangensis	Shandong Province, China	Campanian to Maastrichtian		Likely laid by troodontid	
Spheroolithus	S. phacelus	Shandong Province, China	Campanian to Maastrichtian		Likely laid by hadrosaurs or other ornithopods	

== Age of the formation ==
The Wangshi group of geologic formations is generally considered to be from the Late Cretaceous, although some regions are older. Based on the discovery of Pinacosaurus, only known elsewhere in the Djadokhta Formation or regions of the same age, the Wangshi Group was presumed to be a similar age of 75–71 million years old. The specific age for the Hongtuya Formation has been identified as 73.5–72.9 mya. As the Hongtuya is directly older than the Jiangjunding, it was identified that the Jiangjunding must be of latest Campanian to earliest Maastrichtian age, according to Borinder (2015).
