= Xingezhuang Formation =

Geologic formation in China

- Stratigraphic range: Late Cretaceous, 77.3–73.5 Ma
- Type: Geological Formation
- Unit of: Wangshi Group

Location
- Region: Shandong Province
- Country: China

The Xingezhuang Formation is an Upper Cretaceous fossil bearing rock formation in China. It is located near Zhucheng, in the province of Shandong.

== Fossil content ==
Color key: Taxon / Reclassified taxon / Taxon falsely reported as present / Dubious taxon or junior synonym / Ichnotaxon / Ootaxon / Morphotaxon	Notes; Uncertain or tentative taxa are in small text; ~~crossed out~~ taxa are discredited.

=== Dinosaurs ===
==== Ornithischians ====
Ornithischians of the Xingezhuang Formation
Genus	Species	Location	Stratigraphic position	Material	Notes	Image
Shantungosaurus	S. giganteus	Zhucheng, Shandong Province, China	Wangshi Series	A fairly complete skeleton.	A giant edmontosaurin saurolophine	
Sinoceratops	S. zhuchengensis	Zhucheng, Shandong Province, China	Wangshi Series	Partial skull, including the braincase.	A centrosaurine ceratopsid	
Ischioceratops	I. zhuchengensis	Zhucheng, Shandong Province, China	Wangshi Series	Partially articulated specimen comprising the entire sacrum, a few ossified tendons, both halves of the pelvis, the anteriormost 15 caudal vertebrae in an articulated series, and the right femur, tibia, and fibula.	A leptoceratopsid ceratopsian	
Zhuchengceratops	Z. inexpectus	Zhucheng, Shandon Province, China	Wangshi Series	Partial articulated skeleton including vertebrae, ribs, teeth, and parts of the skull and mandibles.	A leptoceratopsid ceratopsian	

==== Sauropods ====
Sauropods of the Xingezhuang Formation
Genus	Species	Location	Stratigraphic position	Material	Notes	Image
Zhuchengtitan	Z. zangjiazhuangensis	Zhucheng, Shandong Province, China	Wangshi Series	A single humerus.	A saltasaurid titanosaur	

==== Theropods ====
Theropods of the Xingezhuang Formation
Genus	Species	Location	Stratigraphic position	Material	Notes	Image
Zhuchengtyrannus	Z. magnus	Zhucheng, Shandong Province, China	Wangshi Series	A partial skull.	A giant tyrannosaurin tyrannosaurine	
Anomalipes	A. zhaoi	Zhucheng, Shandong Province, China	Wangshi Series	An incomplete left hind limb, including a partial left femur, tibia, fibula, a complete metatarsal III, and two toe bones.	A caenagnathid oviraptorosaurian	

== See also ==
- List of dinosaur-bearing rock formations
