= Wangshi Group =

Geological group in Shandong, China

- Stratigraphic range: Campanian; ~77.3–73.5 Ma
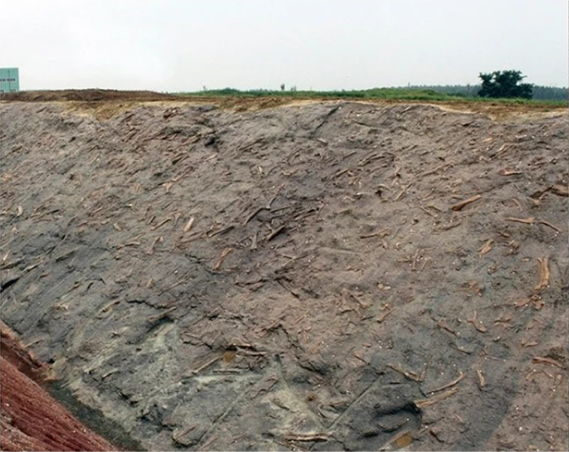
- An outcrop of the Wangshi Group at Kugou which is the type locality for Anomalipes zhaoi. Photographed in c. 2018.
- Type: Group
- Unit of: Jiaolai Basin
- Sub-units: Linjiazhuang, Jiangjunding, Xingezhuang, Hongtuya, Jingangkou & Shijiatun Formations
- Underlies: Jiaozhou Formation
- Overlies: Qingshan Group

Lithology
- Primary: Conglomerate
- Other: Marl

Location
- Coordinates: 36.9°N 120.7°E
- Approximate paleocoordinates: 37.3°N 111.0°E
- Region: Shandong
- Country: China
- Wangshi Group (China) Wangshi Group (Shandong)

The Wangshi Group (Chinese: 王氏群; pinyin: Wángshì Qún) is a geological Group in Shandong, China whose strata date back to the Campanian stage of the Late Cretaceous, approximately 77.3 to 73.5 million years ago. Dinosaur remains are among the fossils that have been recovered from the group.

== Fossil content ==
Color key: Taxon / Reclassified taxon / Taxon falsely reported as present / Dubious taxon or junior synonym / Ichnotaxon / Ootaxon / Morphotaxon

Notes
Uncertain or tentative taxa are in small text
~~crossed out~~ taxa are discredited.

=== Dinosaurs ===
==== Ornithischians ====
Ornithischians of the Wangshi Group
Genus	Species	Location	Stratigraphic position	Material	Notes	Image
Ischioceratops	I. zhuchengensis	Shandong Province, China	Campanian		A leptoceratopsid ceratopsid	
Laiyangosaurus	L. youngi	Shandong Province, China	Campanian		A edmontosaurin saurolophine	
Micropachycephalosaurus	M. hongtuyanensis	Shandong Province, China	Campanian	"Partial mandible, associated postcranial fragments".	A marginocephalian ornithischian	
Pinacosaurus	P. cf. grangeri	Shandong Province, China	Campanian	"A well-preserved sacrum with the attached right ilium and part of the presacral rod, caudal vertebrae, a left femur and a dermal scute."	A ankylosaurine ankylosaurid; remains collected in 1923 by H. C. T'an and Otto Zdansky and mentioned by Buffetaut (1995)	
Shantungosaurus	S. giganteus	Shandong Province, China	Campanian		A giant edmontosauirin saurolophine	
Sinankylosaurus	S. zhuchengensis	Shandon Province, China	Campanian	"Partial right ilium".	Nomen dubium; originally described as an ankylosaur.	
Sinoceratops	S. zhuchengensis	Shandong Province, China	Campanian		A centrosaurine ceratopsid	
Tanius	T. chingkankouensis	Shandong Province, China	Campanian		A hadrosauromorph hadrosauroid	
Tanius	T. laiyangensis	Shandong Province, China	Campanian		Nomen dubium	
Tanius	T. sinensis	Shandong Province, China	Campanian		A hadrosauromorph hadrosauroid	
Tsintaosaurus	T. spinorhinus	Shandong Province, China	Campanian	"Isolated skull and postcranial elements from at least [five] individuals".	A tsintaosaurin lambeosaurine	
Zhuchengceratops	Z. inexpectus	Shandong Province, China	Campanian		A leptoceratopsid ceratopsian	

==== Sauropods ====
Sauropods of the Wangshi Group
Genus	Species	Location	Stratigraphic position	Material	Notes	Image
Zhuchengtitan	Z. zangjiazhuangensis	Shandong Province, China	Campanian	"A single humerus".	A saltasaurid titanosaur	

==== Theropods ====
Theropods of the Wangshi Group
Genus	Species	Location	Stratigraphic position	Material	Notes	Image
Anomalipes	A. zhaoi	Shandong Province, China	Campanian	"Partial left hindlimb".	A caenagnathid oviraptorosaur	
Chingkankousaurus	C. fragilis	Shandong Province, China	Campanian		Nomen dubium	
Zhuchengtyrannus	Z. magnus	Shandong Province, China	Campanian		A tyrannosaurin tyrannosaurine	

=== Turtles ===
Turtles of the Wangshi Group
Genus	Species	Location	Stratigraphic position	Material	Notes	Image
Shandongemys	S. dongwuica	Shandong Province, China	Campanian		A lindholmemydid turtle	

=== Fossil eggs ===
The following fossil eggs were recovered from the Jingangkou Formation of the Wangshi Group.

- Saurischia
  - Elongatoolithidae
    - Elongatoolithus elongatus
- Neornithischia
  - Ovaloolithidae
    - Ovaloolithus chinkangkouensis
    - Ovaloolithus laminadermus

== See also ==
- List of dinosaur-bearing rock formations
