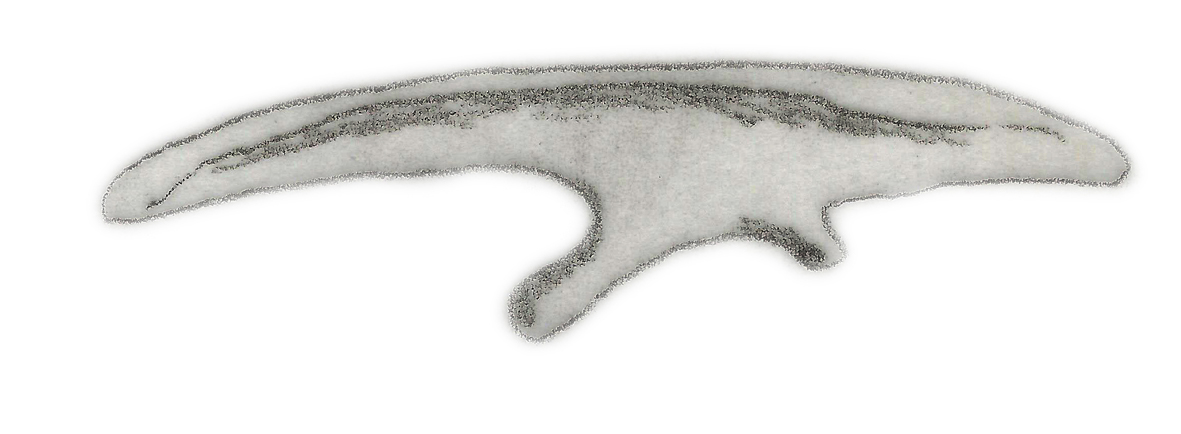
- Drawing of the ilium

Scientific classification
- Kingdom: Animalia
- Phylum: Chordata
- Class: Reptilia
- Clade: Dinosauria
- Clade: †Ornithischia
- Clade: †Marginocephalia
- Genus: †Micropachycephalosaurus; Dong, 1978
- Species: †M. hongtuyanensis

Binomial name
- †Micropachycephalosaurus hongtuyanensis Dong, 1978

= Micropachycephalosaurus =

Micropachycephalosaurus Temporal range: Late Cretaceous, Campanian
- Restoration

Extinct genus of dinosaurs

Micropachycephalosaurus (meaning "small thick-headed lizard") is an extinct genus of basal marginocephalian dinosaur, containing only the type species, Micropachycephalosaurus hongtuyanensis. It lived in China during the Late Cretaceous (Campanian) and was found in the Jiangjunding Formation. It has the longest name of any dinosaur, with 23 letters in the genus name alone, while the full binomial contains 37 letters.

== Discovery and naming ==
The holotype, IVPP V5542 was found on a cliff southwest of Laiyang, Shandong Province, near Hongtuyan train station. The remains were named and described by Dong Zhiming in 1978, as belonging to the new genus and species Micropachycephalosaurus hongtuyanensis, which he incorrectly figured was discovered in the Wangshi Formation.

IVPP V5542 consisted of the left quadrate, a partial tooth row with seven teeth, another partial tooth row with no teeth preserved, a single loose tooth, a partial basioccipital, the centra of three posterior dorsal and two sacral vertebrae, associated with impressions of the neural spines of the posteriormost dorsal and four sacrals, four partial caudal vertebrae preserved in near articulation with associated chevrons, the isolated centra of seven caudals (one with a partial neural arch), a single isolated partial caudal neural arch, a partial left ilium, a left femur, and the proximal portion of the left tibia. Dong (1978) briefly described, but did not figure a parietal and squamosal that also supposedly belonged to the holotype, but Butler & Zhao (2009) were unable to locate them.

== Description ==
Micropachycephalosaurus likely only grew up to 1 metre (3.3 ft) long when fully grown. it was a bipedal and herbivorous dinosaur.

== Classification ==
Paleontologist Dong Zhiming originally described it as a member of the Pachycephalosauria, a group of bipedal dome-headed herbivores. However, re-evaluation of the family Pachycephalosauridae by Sullivan in 2006 cast doubt on this assignment.

Further study of the holotype by Butler and Zhao in 2008 also failed to find any characteristics linking Micropachycephalosaurus with the pachycephalosaurs. The one piece of evidence that could provide this link, the supposedly thickened skull roof, was missing from the fossil collection the scientists examined, and so could not be used to support or refute its original classification. Butler and Zhao therefore classified it as an indeterminate member of the Cerapoda. A cladistic analysis performed by Butler et al. (2011) showed that Micropachycephalosaurus is a basal member of the Ceratopsia. Phylogenetic analyses by Fonseca et al. (2024) instead recovered this taxon as a basal pachycephalosaur.

== Paleoecology ==
Micropachycephalosaurus was found in the Jiangjunding Formation of the Chinese Wangshi Group. The Jiangjunding formation consists purpley-grey or reddy-brown sandstones or various consistencies, siltstones and conglomerates. The Wangshi group of geologic formations is generally considered to be from the Late Cretaceous, although some regions are older. Based on the discovery of Pinacosaurus, only known elsewhere in the Djadokhta Formation or regions of the same age, the Wangshi Group was presumed to be a similar age of 75-71 million years old. The specific age for the Hongtuya Formation has been identified as 73.5-72.9 mya. As the Hongtuya is directly older than the Jiangjunding, it was identified that Tanius sinensis, a contemporary of Micropachycephalosaurus, lived in the latest Campanian to earliest Maastrichtian by Borinder in 2015.

The Jiangjunding Formation was deposited in a fluvial to lacustrine environment. The climate was warm and humid during the majority of the timespan, although it was beginning to dry out after the Jiangjunding. Taxa that lived alongside Micropachycephalosaurus in the formation include the ankylosaur Pinacosaurus cf. grangeri; the hadrosaur Tanius sinensis; intermediate sauropods; intermediate coelurosaurs; and intermediate cheloniids which show similarities to Nanhsiungchelyidae. Multiple localities of dinosaur eggs have also been identified.

== See also ==
- Timeline of ceratopsian research
- Timeline of pachycephalosaur research
