= Chingkankousaurus =

Chingkankousaurus Temporal range: Late Cretaceous, 85–75 Ma

Scientific classification
- Kingdom: Animalia
- Phylum: Chordata
- Class: Reptilia
- Clade: Dinosauria
- Clade: Saurischia
- Clade: Theropoda
- Superfamily: †Tyrannosauroidea
- Clade: †Pantyrannosauria
- Genus: †Chingkankousaurus; Young, 1958
- Species: †C. fragilis

Binomial name
- †Chingkankousaurus fragilis Young, 1958

Extinct genus of reptiles

Chingkankousaurus (named for Ch'ing-kang-kou, sic for Wade–Giles Chin1-kang1-k'ou3, pinyin Jin-gang-kou 'diamond port' Chinese: 金刚口 village) is a genus of theropod dinosaur containing the single species Chingkankousaurus fragilis. C. fragilis is known only from a single fossilized bone fragment (specimen number IVPP V836) from the late Cretaceous Period Wangshi Series of Shandong province in eastern China.

== Description ==
Chingkankousaurus was identified by Yang Zhongjian (C.C. Young) in 1958 from a single "scapula", which he said "basically resembles that of Allosaurus but is smaller." It had been proposed that the scapula was a rib or gastralia fragment, but this was considered unlikely in a 2013 study. Molnar et al. (1990) thought the scapula may have belonged to a tyrannosaurid. Chure (2000) assigned it to the Coelurosauria, and more recent research has supported the initial identification as a type of tyrannosauroid, with some even arguing it to be a synonym of Tarbosaurus bataar, though it is currently considered a nomen dubium among that group.
