= Ding Wenjiang =

Chinese geologist and writer (1887–1936)

- 丁文江
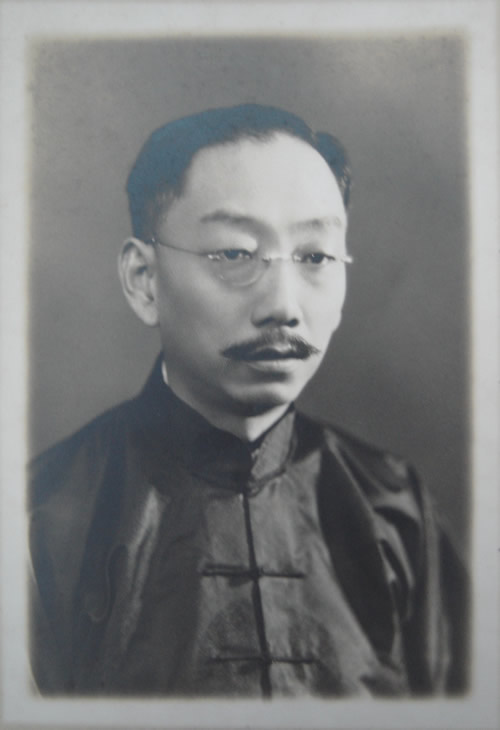

Personal details
- Born: March 20, 1887 Taixing County, Jiangsu, Qing dynasty
- Died: January 5, 1936 (aged 48) Changsha, Hunan, Republic of China
- Party: Independent
- Spouse: Shi Jiuyuan
- Education: University of Glasgow, Graduated from Zoology and Geology in 1911
- Occupation: Essayist; geologist; writer
- Offices held: 1913–1917: Director of the Geology Division, Mining Administration Department, Ministry of Industry and Commerce; 1917–1921; 1927–1934: Director of the Geological Survey Institute; 1921–1925: General Manager of Beipiao Coal Mine Company; 1926: General Manager of Songhu (now in Shanghai) Commercial Port Supervision Office; 1934–1936: Director General, Academia Sinica

Ding Wenjiang (Chinese: 丁文江; pinyin: Dīng Wénjiāng; March 20, 1887 – January 5, 1936), courtesy name Zaijun (在君), was a Chinese essayist, geologist, and writer active especially in the Republic of China. He was once a member of the Board of Directors of Private Nankai University and Professor of the Department of Geology in National Peking University. In his own time, his name was transcribed as either V.K. Ting, or Ting Wen-chiang.

== Biography ==
=== Early life ===
Ding was born into a wealthy family in Taixing, Jiangsu Province. He went to study in Japan in 1902, and later studied in Britain, majoring in zoology and geology. In 1911, Ding graduated from the University of Glasgow. After returning to China, he taught at Nanyang Public School (now Shanghai Jiao Tong University) in Shanghai. In 1913, Ding became the geological section chief in the Mining Administrative Bureau of the Ministry of Industry and Commerce, and went to Shanxi and Yunnan, conducting geological and mineral exploitation.

=== National Geological Survey ===
Together with Wong Wen-hao (Weng Wenhao in pinyin), Ding was also the founder of China's new National Geological Survey, where he collaborated closely with foreign scholars such as Johan Gunnar Andersson in training the first generation of Chinese geologists (Fiskesjö and Chen 2004; Fiskesjö 2011, Shen 2014). In 1921, Ding became the general manager of the Beipiao Mining Company, and founded the Chinese Geological Society. He served as vice president of the society, and was the editor-in-chief of "Chinese Palaeobiology".

In 1923, Ding published a paper, "Mythology and Science", arguing with Zhang Junmai over science and philosophy, fighting against the view that "science is irrelevant to human philosophy" (on the major debates of which this was a part, see Furth 1970).

=== Director ===
In 1925, Ding was appointed as the director of Shanghai Commercial Bureau. He represented Jiangsu provincial government to negotiate with foreign delegates to Shanghai. They signed "The Temporary Regulation on Reclamation of Juridical Rights in Shanghai by China" on August 1, 1926. In 1931, Ding became a professor of geology at Peking University. Together with Weng Wenhao and Zeng Shiying, he edited and published "New Geographic Map of the Republic of China", and "Provincial Maps of China". In June, 1934, Ding served as the chief staff of Academia Sinica. When he was exploring a coal mine in Hunan in 1936, he was poisoned by coal gas. Fu Sinian came from Beijing to take care of him. On January 5, Ding died in Xiangya Hospital in Changsha. Following his will, he was buried on Yuelu Mountain.

=== Author ===
Ding authored The Textbook of Zoology. His geological exploitation materials were compiled into Mr. Ding Wenjiang's Geological Investigation Report, and published in 1947. Ding was also the first Chinese scholar to systematically study the written words of Yi ethnicity (see Fiskesjö 2011). Hu Shih wrote Biography of Ding Wenjiang, and commented that he is "a most Europeanized Chinese, and a most scientifically styled Chinese." (Hu Shih: Ding Wenjiang). At the time of his death, he was working on a comprehensive book on the archaeology of ancient China.
