= List of Mesozoic bird-line archosaur genera (P–S) =

This list of Mesozoic bird-line archosaur genera is a comprehensive listing of all Mesozoic genera that are included in the clade Avemetatarsalia (alternatively known as Pan-Aves), including dinosaurs, pterosaurs, silesaurids, lagerpetids, and more basal genera. The list includes all commonly accepted genera whose names begin with the letters P–S. The list currently includes 340 genera.

== Scope and terminology ==
There is no official, canonical list of Mesozoic bird-line archosaur genera, but thorough attempts have been made for its various subgroups, such as George Olshevsky's Dinosaur Genera List, the book The Dinosauria, Mikko Haaramo's Phylogeny Archive, Mike Hanson's The Pterosauria, the Pterosaur Species List, Donald F. Glut's Dinosaurs: The Encyclopedia series, Holtz's list of Mesozoic dinosaurs, Molina-Perez & Larramendi's list of theropods, and Mickey Mortimer's Theropod Database. These lists have been supplemented with more recent publications to create this one.

- Genus: The generic name of the taxon, sourced to its description publication.
- Authors: Full names of the authors of the descriptions. This column can be sorted by last names.
- Year: The year when the descriptions were physically published. These are not necessarily the years the names became valid according to the rules of the International Commission on Zoological Nomenclature (ICZN).
- Formation: The geological formations each taxon was found in, along with their epoch and age. In the case of multiple formations, holotype localities are marked by an asterisk.
- Location: Every country and first-level subdivision the taxon was found in. In the case of multiple locations, holotype localities are marked by an asterisk.

== The list ==
Genus	Authors	Year	Formation	Location	Notes	Images
Pachagnathus	Ricardo N. Martínez; Brian Andres; Cecilia Apaldetti; Ignacio A. Cerda	2022	Quebrada del Barro Formation (Late Triassic, Norian)	Argentina (San Juan)	One of the earliest pterosaurs from the Southern Hemisphere	
Pachycephalosaurus	Barnum Brown; Erich M. Schlaikjer	1943	Hell Creek Formation (Late Cretaceous, Maastrichtian); Lance Formation (Late Cretaceous, Maastrichtian)*	United States (Montana; South Dakota; Wyoming*)	Possessed a tall, rounded head dome surrounded by bony knobs	
Pachyrhinosaurus	Charles M. Sternberg	1950	Horseshoe Canyon Formation (Late Cretaceous, Campanian to Maastrichtian)*; Prince Creek Formation (Late Cretaceous, Campanian to Maastrichtian); St. Mary River Formation (Late Cretaceous, Maastrichtian); Wapiti Formation (Late Cretaceous, Campanian to Maastrichtian)	Canada (Alberta*); United States (Alaska)	Three species have been named, each with a unique pattern of cranial ornamentation	
Pachysauriscus	Oskar Kuhn	1959	Trossingen Formation (Late Triassic, Norian to Rhaetian)	Germany (Baden-Württemberg)	Usually seen as a synonym of Plateosaurus, but one review considered it distinct	
Pachysuchus	Zhongjian Yang	1951	Lufeng Formation (Early Jurassic, Sinemurian)	China (Yunnan)	Considered a phytosaur from its original naming until a redescription in 2012	
Padillasaurus	José L. Carballido; Diego Pol; Mary L. Parra Ruge; Santiago P. Bernal; María E. Páramo-Fonseca; Fernando Etayo-Serna	2015	Paja Formation (Early Cretaceous, Barremian)	Colombia (Boyacá)	Originally described as a brachiosaurid although it could also be a somphospondylian	
Palaeocursornis	Eugen Kessler; Tiberiu Jurcsák	1986	Bauxite of Cornet (Early Cretaceous, Berriasian)	Romania (Bihor)	Has been conflated with Eurolimnornis	
Palaeopteryx	James A. Jensen	1981	Morrison Formation (Late Jurassic, Kimmeridgian to Tithonian)	United States (Colorado)	Known from a few very small bones which could belong to either a bird or a small bird-like dinosaur	
Palaeornis	Gideon A. Mantell	1844	Tunbridge Wells Sand Formation (Early Cretaceous, Valanginian)	England (West Sussex)	Genus name preoccupied by a genus of parrots	
Palaeoscincus	Joseph Leidy	1856	Judith River Formation (Late Cretaceous, Campanian)	United States (Montana)	Although many restorations depict it with the spikes of Edmontonia and the tail club of Ankylosaurus, this is most likely incorrect	
Palaeotringa	Othniel C. Marsh	1870	Hornerstown Formation (Late Cretaceous to Paleocene, Maastrichtian to Danian)	United States (New Jersey)	May have come from Paleocene deposits	
Palintropus	Pierce Brodkorb	1970	Lance Formation (Late Cretaceous, Maastrichtian)	United States (Wyoming)	Has been suggested to be an early quercymegapodid	
Paludititan	Zoltán Csiki; Vlad Codrea; Cătălin Jipa-Murzea; Pascal Godefroit	2010	Sânpetru Formation (Late Cretaceous, Maastrichtian)	Romania (Hunedoara)	Some of its bones are identical to those of Magyarosaurus, but their synonymy cannot be confirmed	
Pampadromaeus	Sergio F. Cabreira; Cesar L. Schultz; Jonathas S. Bittencourt; Marina B. Soares; Daniel C. Fortier; Lúcio R. da Silva; Max C. Langer	2011	Candelária Sequence (Late Triassic, Carnian)	Brazil (Rio Grande do Sul)	Some features of its jaws are similar to those of theropods	
Pamparaptor	Juan D. Porfiri; Jorge O. Calvo; Domenica D. dos Santos	2011	Portezuelo Formation (Late Cretaceous, Turonian to Coniacian)	Argentina (Neuquén)	Had a troodontid-like metatarsal	
Panamericansaurus	Jorge O. Calvo; Juan D. Porfiri	2010	Allen Formation (Late Cretaceous, Maastrichtian)	Argentina (Neuquén)	A titanosaur known from a single partial skeleton	
Pandoravenator	Oliver W. M. Rauhut; Diego Pol	2017	Cañadón Calcáreo Formation (Late Jurassic, Oxfordian to Tithonian)	Argentina (Chubut)	Inconsistent in phylogenetic placement	
Pangupterus	Junchang Lü; Cunyu Liu; Lijun Pan; Caizhi Shen	2016	Jiufotang Formation (Early Cretaceous, Aptian)	China (Liaoning)	Had long, sharp teeth that may indicate a fish-trapping mechanism	
Panguraptor	Hailu You; Yoichi Azuma; Tao Wang; Yaming Wang; Zhiming Dong	2014	Lufeng Formation (Early Jurassic, Hettangian)	China (Yunnan)	The first definitive coelophysoid known from Asia	
Panoplosaurus	Lawrence M. Lambe	1919	Dinosaur Park Formation (Late Cretaceous, Campanian)	Canada (Alberta)	Unlike other nodosaurids, it lacked enlarged spikes	
Panphagia	Ricardo N. Martínez; Oscar A. Alcober	2009	Ischigualasto Formation (Late Triassic, Carnian to Norian)	Argentina (San Juan)	Was omnivorous as indicated by its heterodont dentition	
Pantydraco	Peter M. Galton; Adam M. Yates; Diane Kermack	2007	Pant-y-Ffynnon Quarry (Late Triassic, Rhaetian)	Wales (Vale of Glamorgan)	Originally named as a species of Thecodontosaurus and may indeed belong to that genus	
Papiliovenator	Rui Pei; Yuying Qin; Aishu Wen; Qi Zhao; Zhe Wang; Zhanmin Liu; Weilesi Guo; Po Liu; Weiming Ye; Lanyun Wang; Zhigang Yin; Ruiming Dai; Xing Xu	2022	Bayan Mandahu Formation (Late Cretaceous, Campanian)	China (Inner Mongolia)	Had a short, subtriangular skull similar to those of Early Cretaceous troodontids	
Parabohaiornis	Min Wang; Zhonghe Zhou; Jingmai K. O'Connor; Nikita V. Zelenkov	2014	Jiufotang Formation (Early Cretaceous, Aptian)	China (Liaoning)	A close relative of Bohaiornis	
Parahesperornis	Larry Martin	1984	Niobrara Formation (Late Cretaceous, Coniacian to Campanian)	United States (Kansas)	Preserves impressions of scutes and feathers	
Parahongshanornis	Li Li; Jingqi Wang; Shilin Hou	2011	Jiufotang Formation (Early Cretaceous, Aptian)	China (Liaoning)	One of the youngest known hongshanornithids	
Paralitherizinosaurus	Yoshitsugu Kobayashi; Ryuji Takasaki; Anthony R. Fiorillo; Tsogtbaatar Chinzorig; Yoshinori Hikida	2022	Osoushinai Formation (Late Cretaceous, Campanian)	Japan (Hokkaido)	Had stiffened claws that may have been used to pull vegetation to the mouth	
Paralititan	Joshua B. Smith; Matthew C. Lamanna; Kernneth J. Lacovara; Peter Dodson; Jennifer R. Smith; Jason C. Poole; Robert Giegengack; Yousry Attia	2001	Bahariya Formation (Late Cretaceous, Cenomanian)	Egypt (Giza)	May have lived in a tidal flat environment dominated by mangroves	
Paranthodon	Franz Nopcsa	1929	Kirkwood Formation (Early Cretaceous, Berriasian to Hauterivian)	South Africa (Eastern Cape)	Although only known from fragmentary specimens, they are enough to tell that it was a stegosaur	
Parapengornis	Han Hu; Jingmai K. O'Connor; Zhonghe Zhou	2015	Jiufotang Formation (Early Cretaceous, Aptian)	China (Liaoning)	Proposed to have a woodpecker-like lifestyle due to features of the foot and tail	
Paraprotopteryx	Xiaoting Zheng; Zihui Zhang; Lianhai Hou	2007	Huajiying Formation (Early Cretaceous, Hauterivian)	China (Hebei)	Seemingly had four ribbon-like tail feathers instead of only two as in most enantiornitheans	
Parapsicephalus	Gustav von Arthaber	1919	Whitby Mudstone Formation (Early Jurassic, Toarcian)	England (Yorkshire)	An early pterosaur with historically contentious relationships	
Pararhabdodon	Maria Lourdes Casanovas-Cladellas; José-Vicente Santafé Llopis; Albert Isidro-Llorens	1993	Conques Formation (Late Cretaceous, Maastrichtian)	Spain (Catalonia)	The first lambeosaurine identified from Europe	
Parasaurolophus	William A. Parks	1922	Dinosaur Park Formation (Late Cretaceous, Campanian)*; Fruitland Formation (Late Cretaceous, Campanian); Kaiparowits Formation (Late Cretaceous, Campanian); Kirtland Formation (Late Cretaceous, Campanian)	Canada (Alberta*); United States (New Mexico; Utah)	Possessed a curved, hollow crest that varied in size between species	
Paraxenisaurus	Claudia I. Serrano-Brañas; Belinda Espinosa-Chávez; S. Augusta Maccracken; Cirene Gutiérrez-Blando; Claudio de León-Dávila; José F. Ventura	2020	Cerro del Pueblo Formation (Late Cretaceous, Campanian)	Mexico (Coahuila)	Described as the first deinocheirid from North America	
Pareisactus	Javier Párraga; Albert Prieto-Márquez	2019	Conques Formation (Late Cretaceous, Maastrichtian)	Spain (Catalonia)	Represented by a single scapula recovered from a hadrosaur bonebed	
Parksosaurus	Charles M. Sternberg	1937	Horseshoe Canyon Formation (Late Cretaceous, Maastrichtian)	Canada (Alberta)	Had long toes which may be an adaptation to walking on soft soils in watercourses and marshlands	
Paronychodon	Edward D. Cope	1876	Hell Creek Formation (Late Cretaceous, Maastrichtian); Judith River Formation (Late Cretaceous, Campanian)*; Lance Formation (Late Cretaceous, Maastrichtian)	United States (Montana*; North Dakota; South Dakota; Wyoming)	Only known from highly distinctive teeth	
Parvavis	Min Wang; Zhonghe Zhou; Guanghui Xu	2014	Jiangdihe Formation (Late Cretaceous, Turonian to Santonian)	China (Yunnan)	Small but fully mature at the time of its death	
Parvicursor	Alexander A. Karhu; Alexander S. Rautian	1996	Baruungoyot Formation (Late Cretaceous, Maastrichtian)	Mongolia (Ömnögovi)	Originally believed to represent a diminutive adult dinosaur, although it was recently reinterpreted as a juvenile	
Pasquiaornis	Tim T. Tokaryk; Stephen L. Cumbaa; John E. Storer	1997	Belle Fourche Formation (Late Cretaceous, Cenomanian)	Canada (Saskatchewan)	One of the oldest hesperornitheans known from North America	
Patagonykus	Fernando E. Novas	1996	Portezuelo Formation (Late Cretaceous, Turonian to Coniacian)	Argentina (Neuquén)	Its discovery allowed researchers to connect Alvarezsaurus to parvicursorines	
Patagopelta	Facundo Riguetti; Xabier Pereda-Suberbiola; Denis Ponce; Leonardo Salgado; Sebastián Apesteguía; Sebastián Rozadilla; Victoria Arbour	2022	Allen Formation (Late Cretaceous, Maastrichtian)	Argentina (Río Negro)	Although originally described as a nodosaurid, later analyses recover it as a parankylosaurian	
Patagopteryx	Herculano M. F. Alvarenga; José F. Bonaparte	1992	Bajo de la Carpa Formation (Late Cretaceous, Santonian)	Argentina (Neuquén)	A secondarily flightless basal ornithuromorph	
Patagosaurus	José F. Bonaparte	1979	Cañadón Asfalto Formation (Early Jurassic, Toarcian)	Argentina (Chubut)	Known from remains of adults and juveniles, depicting how various features developed in sauropods as they aged	
Patagotitan	José L. Carballido; Diego Pol; Alejandro Otero; Ignacio A. Cerda; Leonardo Salgado; Alberto C. Garrido; Jahandar Ramezani; N. R. Cúneo; Javier M. Krause	2017	Cerro Barcino Formation (Early Cretaceous to Late Cretaceous, Aptian to Cenomanian)	Argentina (Chubut)	One of the largest dinosaurs known from reasonably complete remains	
Pawpawsaurus	Yuong-Nam Lee	1996	Paw Paw Formation (Early Cretaceous, Albian)	United States (Texas)	Had enlarged nasal cavities that gave it an acute sense of smell, even more powerful than that of contemporary theropods	
Pectinodon	Kenneth Carpenter	1982	Hell Creek Formation (Late Cretaceous, Maastrichtian); Lance Formation (Late Cretaceous, Maastrichtian)*	United States (Montana; Wyoming*)	Had comb-like serrations on its teeth	
Pedopenna	Xing Xu; Zhang Fucheng	2005	Haifanggou Formation (Late Jurassic, Oxfordian)	China (Liaoning)	Known from a single leg with the impressions of long, symmetrical feathers	
Pegomastax	Paul C. Sereno	2012	Upper Elliot Formation (Early Jurassic, Sinemurian to Pliensbachian)	South Africa (Eastern Cape)	The morphology of its jaws and beak suggests a diet of tough plants	
Peishansaurus	Birger Bohlin	1953	Minhe Formation (Campanian to Maastrichtian)	China (Gansu)	Has been compared to thyreophorans and marginocephalians, but it is impossible to determine which assignment is correct	
Pelecanimimus	Bernardino P. Pérez-Moreno; José L. Sanz; Angela D. Buscalioni; José J. Moratalla; Francisco Ortega; Diego Rasskin-Gutman	1994	La Huérguina Formation (Early Cretaceous, Barremian)	Spain (Castilla-La Mancha)	Preserves extensive soft tissue impressions revealing the presence of a keratinous head crest and a pelican-like gular pouch	
Pellegrinisaurus	Leonardo Salgado	1996	Allen Formation (Late Cretaceous, Maastrichtian)	Argentina (Río Negro)	May have lived inland unlike other contemporaneous titanosaurs	
Peloroplites	Kenneth Carpenter; Jeff Bartlett; John Bird; Reese Barrick	2008	Cedar Mountain Formation (Early Cretaceous to Late Cretaceous, Albian to Cenomanian)	United States (Utah)	One of the largest known nodosaurids	
Pelorosaurus	Gideon A. Mantell	1850	Tunbridge Wells Sand Formation (Early Cretaceous, Valanginian)	England (West Sussex)	The first sauropod identified as a terrestrial animal	
Pendraig	Stephan N. F. Spiekman; Martín D. Ezcurra; Richard J. Butler; Nicholas C. Fraser; Susannah C.R. Maidment	2021	Pant-y-Ffynnon Quarry (Late Triassic, Rhaetian)	Wales (Vale of Glamorgan)	Would have lived on a dry limestone island	
Penelopognathus	Pascal Godefroit; Hong Li; Changyong Shang	2005	Bayin-Gobi Formation (Early Cretaceous, Albian)	China (Inner Mongolia)	Named from a single dentary	
Pengornis	Zhonghe Zhou; Julia A. Clarke; Fucheng Zhang	2008	Jiufotang Formation (Early Cretaceous, Aptian)	China (Liaoning)	One of the largest members of the Enantiornithes known from decent remains	
Pentaceratops	Henry F. Osborn	1923	Kirtland Formation (Late Cretaceous, Campanian)	United States (New Mexico)	Its epijugal bones (the hornlets under its eyes) were relatively large	
Perijasaurus	Aldo F. Rincón; Daniel A. Raad Pájaro; Harold F. Jiménez Velandia; Martín D. Ezcurra; Jeffrey A. Wilson Mantilla	2022	La Quinta Formation (Early Jurassic to Middle Jurassic, Toarcian to Aalenian)	Colombia (Cesar)	Only known from a single vertebra	
Peteinosaurus	Rupert Wild	1978	Calcare di Zorzino (Late Triassic, Norian)	Italy (Lombardy)	The paratype may not belong to the same species as the holotype	
Petrobrasaurus	Leonardo S. Filippi; José I. Canudo; Leonardo J. Salgado; Alberto C. Garrido; Rodolfo A. García; Ignacio A. Cerda; Alejandro Otero	2011	Plottier Formation (Late Cretaceous, Coniacian to Santonian)	Argentina (Neuquén)	Shares somes features with lognkosaurs, but its membership within this clade cannot be confirmed	
Petrodactyle	David W. E. Hone; René Lauer; Bruce Lauer; Frederik Spindler	2023	Mörnsheim Formation (Late Jurassic, Tithonian)	Germany (Bavaria)	One of the largest Solnhofen pterosaurs	
Phaedrolosaurus	Zhiming Dong	1973	Lianmuqin Formation (Early Cretaceous, Aptian to Albian)	China (Xinjiang)	May have been a dromaeosaurid	
Philovenator	Xing Xu; Qi Zhao; Corwin Sullivan; Qingwei Tan; P. Martin Sander; Qingyu Ma	2012	Bayan Mandahu Formation (Late Cretaceous, Campanian)	China (Inner Mongolia)	Closely related to the contemporary Linhevenator but likely represents a separate taxon	
Phosphatodraco	Xabier Pereda-Suberbiola: Nathalie Bardet; Stéphane Jouve; Mohamed Iarochène; Baâdi Bouya; Mbarek Amaghzaz	2003	Couche III (Late Cretaceous, Maastrichtian)	Morocco (Béni Mellal-Khénifra)	One of the few azhdarchids that preserves a relatively complete neck	
Phuwiangosaurus	Valérie Martin; Eric Buffetaut; Varavudh Suteethorn	1994	Sao Khua Formation (Early Cretaceous, Valanginian to Hauterivian)	Thailand (Khon Kaen)	A large member of the Euhelopodidae	
Phuwiangvenator	Adun Samathi; Phornphen Chanthasit; P. Martin Sander	2019	Sao Khua Formation (Early Cretaceous, Valanginian to Hauterivian)	Thailand (Khon Kaen)	Combines features of both allosauroids and coelurosaurs	
Phyllodon	Richard A. Thulborn	1973	Alcobaça Formation (Late Jurassic, Kimmeridgian)	Portugal (Leiria)	The front and back of its teeth were asymmetrical	
Piatnitzkysaurus	José F. Bonaparte	1979	Cañadón Asfalto Formation (Early Jurassic, Toarcian)	Argentina (Chubut)	One of the few early theropods with a well-preserved braincase	
Piksi	David J. Varricchio	2002	Two Medicine Formation (Late Cretaceous, Campanian)	United States (Montana)	Has been considered both a bird and a pterosaur	
Pilmatueia	Rodolfo A. Coria; Guillermo J. Windholz; Francisco Ortega; Philip J. Currie	2019	Mulichinco Formation (Early Cretaceous, Valanginian)	Argentina (Neuquén)	Had elongated spines on its cervical vertebrae, although they were not as tall as those of Amargasaurus and Bajadasaurus	
Pinacosaurus	Charles W. Gilmore	1933	Alagteeg Formation (Late Cretaceous, Santonian to Campanian); Bayan Mandahu Formation (Late Cretaceous, Campanian); Djadokhta Formation (Late Cretaceous, Campanian)*	China (Inner Mongolia; Ningxia); Mongolia (Ömnögovi*)	May have been capable of producing bird-like vocalizations	
Pisanosaurus	Rodolfo M. Casamiquela	1967	Ischigualasto Formation (Late Triassic, Carnian to Norian)	Argentina (San Juan)	Either a basal ornithischian, a silesaurid, or a form linking both groups	
Piscivoravis	Shuang Zhou; Zhonghe Zhou; Jingmai K. O'Connor	2014	Jiufotang Formation (Early Cretaceous, Aptian)	China (Liaoning)	Was piscivorous as indicated by preserved fish bones in its stomach area	
Piscivorenantiornis	Min Wang; Zhonghe Zhou; Corwin Sullivan	2016	Jiufotang Formation (Early Cretaceous, Aptian)	China (Liaoning)	Known from a disarticulated skeleton preserved overlying a piece of stomach content composed of fish bones, which may have been its last meal	
Pitekunsaurus	Leonardo S. Filippi; Alberto C. Garrido	2008	Anacleto Formation (Late Cretaceous, Campanian)	Argentina (Neuquén)	Known from several bones from different parts of the body, including a braincase	
Piveteausaurus	Philippe Taquet; Samuel P. Welles	1977	Marnes de Dives (Middle Jurassic, Callovian)	France (Normandy)	Has been suggested to be a species of Proceratosaurus	
Planicoxa	Tony DiCroce; Kenneth Carpenter	2001	Cedar Mountain Formation (Early Cretaceous, Barremian to Aptian)	United States (Utah)	The rear of its ilium was characteristically flat	
Plataleorhynchus	Stafford C. B. Howse; Andrew R. Milner	1995	Purbeck Marble (Late Jurassic to Early Cretaceous, Tithonian to Berriasian)	England (Dorset)	Had an expanded circular section at the tip of its snout similar to that of a spoonbill	
Platanavis	Lev A. Nessov	1992	Bissekty Formation (Late Cretaceous, Turonian)	Uzbekistan (Navoiy)	Only known from an isolated synsacrum	
Plateosauravus	Friedrich von Huene	1932	Lower Elliot Formation (Late Triassic, Norian)	South Africa (Eastern Cape*; Limpopo)	Known from multiple specimens, including those of juveniles	
Plateosaurus	Hermann von Meyer	1837	Löwenstein Formation (Late Triassic, Norian); Trossingen Formation (Late Triassic, Norian to Rhaetian)*	Germany (Baden-Württemberg; Bavaria*; Saxony-Anhalt); Switzerland (Aargau)	Known from over a hundred skeletons, several of them nearly complete	
Platypelta	Paul Penkalski	2018	Dinosaur Park Formation (Late Cretaceous, Campanian)	Canada (Alberta)	Originally assigned to Euoplocephalus but was given its own genus because of several morphological differences	
Platytholus	John R. Horner; Mark B. Goodwin; David C. Evans	2022	Hell Creek Formation (Late Cretaceous, Maastrichtian)	United States (Montana)	Differs from juveniles of the contemporary Pachycephalosaurus and Sphaerotholus, hence its classification as a new genus	
Plesiohadros	Khishigjav Tsogtbaatar; David B. Weishampel; David C. Evans; Mahito Watabe	2014	Alagteeg Formation (Late Cretaceous, Santonian to Campanian)	Mongolia (Ömnögovi)	The first hadrosauroid known from its formation	
Pneumatoraptor	Attila Ősi; Sebastián Apesteguía; Michał Kowalewski	2010	Csehbánya Formation (Late Cretaceous, Santonian)	Hungary (Veszprém)	One study suggests a position as a possible early palaeognath	
Podokesaurus	Mignon Talbot	1911	Portland Formation (Early Jurassic, Hettangian to Sinemurian)	United States (Massachusetts)	May have had a tail one and a half times longer than the rest of its skeleton	
Poekilopleuron	Jacques A. Eudes-Deslongchamps	1836	Calcaire de Caen (Middle Jurassic, Bathonian)	France (Normandy)	Its holotype was found alongside fish remains	
Polacanthoides	Franz Nopcsa	1928	Wessex Formation (Early Cretaceous, Berriasian to Barremian)	England (Isle of Wight)	Potentially a synonym of Hylaeosaurus, Polacanthus, or both (a chimera)	
Polacanthus	William Fox	1865	Wessex Formation (Early Cretaceous, Barremian)	England (Isle of Wight)	Possessed a flat sacral shield dotted with small bumps	
Polarornis	Sankar Chatterjee	2002	López de Bertodano Formation (Late Cretaceous to Paleocene, Maastrichtian to Danian)	Antarctica (Argentine Antarctica; British Antarctic Territory; Chilean Antarctic Territory)	Has been considered a primitive loon	
Polyodontosaurus	Charles W. Gilmore	1932	Dinosaur Park Formation (Late Cretaceous, Campanian)	Canada (Alberta)	May be identical to Latenivenatrix	
Polyonax	Edward D. Cope	1874	Denver Formation (Late Cretaceous, Maastrichtian)	United States (Colorado)	A poorly known ceratopsian	
Portellsaurus	Andrés Santos-Cubedo; Carlos de Santisteban; Begoña Poza; Sergi Meseguer	2021	Margas de Mirambell Formation (Early Cretaceous, Barremian)	Spain (Valencia)	Closely related to Ouranosaurus	
Potamornis	Andrzej Elżanowski; Gregory S. Paul; Thomas A. Stidham	2001	Lance Formation (Late Cretaceous, Maastrichtian)	United States (Wyoming)	May have had a different feeding style than other hesperornitheans	
Powellvenator	Martín D. Ezcurra	2017	Los Colorados Formation (Late Triassic, Norian)	Argentina (La Rioja)	Some of this genus' remains were originally associated with those of a pseudosuchian	
Pradhania	T. S. Kutty; Sankar Chatterjee; Peter M. Galton; Paul Upchurch	2007	Upper Dharmaram Formation (Early Jurassic, Hettangian to Sinemurian)	India (Telangana)	Closely related to Massospondylus	
Praeornis	Alexander S. Rautian	1978	Karabastau Formation (Middle Jurassic to Late Jurassic, Callovian to Kimmeridgian)	Kazakhstan (Jambyl)	Has been considered a plant but may be the only known Jurassic enantiornithean	
Prejanopterus	Carolina Fuentes Vidarte; Manuel Meijide Calvo	2010	Leza Formation (Early Cretaceous, Aptian)	Spain (La Rioja)	Two upper jaws were found curved, while the lower jaws were all straight	
Prenocephale	Teresa Maryańska; Halszka Osmólska	1974	Nemegt Formation (Late Cretaceous, Maastrichtian)	Mongolia (Ömnögovi)	Had a distinctively conical dome	
Prenoceratops	Brenda J. Chinnery	2004	Oldman Formation (Late Cretaceous, Campanian); Two Medicine Formation (Late Cretaceous, Campanian)*	Canada (Alberta); United States (Montana*)	The only basal neoceratopsian known from a bonebed	
Preondactylus	Rupert Wild	1984	Forni Dolostone (Late Triassic, Norian)	Italy (Friuli-Venezia Giulia)	Its teeth were monocusped, pointed, and widely spaced apart, which meant it did not have tooth wear	
Priconodon	Othniel C. Marsh	1888	Arundel Formation (Early Cretaceous, Aptian to Albian)	United States (Maryland)	Large but currently only known from teeth	
Priodontognathus	Harry G. Seeley	1875	Lower Calcareous Grit (Late Jurassic, Oxfordian)	England (Yorkshire)	Only known from a single maxilla with teeth	
Proa	Andrew T. McDonald; Eduardo Espílez; Luis Mampel; James I. Kirkland; Luis Alcalá	2012	Escucha Formation (Early Cretaceous, Aptian to Albian)	Spain (Aragon)	The tip of its jaw was shaped like the bow of a ship	
Probactrosaurus	Anatoly K. Rozhdestvensky	1966	Miaogou Formation (Early Cretaceous, Aptian to Albian)	China (Inner Mongolia)	The closest relative to the Hadrosauromorpha based on the definition of the group	
Probrachylophosaurus	Elizabeth A. Freedman Fowler; John R. Horner	2015	Judith River Formation (Late Cretaceous, Campanian)	United States (Montana)	Shows a skull morphology transitional between crestless and crested brachylophosaurins	
Proceratosaurus	Friedrich von Huene	1926	Great Oolite Group (Middle Jurassic, Bathonian)	England (Gloucestershire)	Preserves a small horn on its snout which may have anchored a crest as in the related Guanlong	
Procompsognathus	Eberhard Fraas	1913	Löwenstein Formation (Late Triassic, Norian)	Germany (Baden-Württemberg)	Has been suggested to be non-dinosaurian	
Prodeinodon	Henry F. Osborn	1924	Öösh Formation (Early Cretaceous, Berriasian to Barremian)*; Xinlong Formation (Early Cretaceous, Aptian to Albian)	China (Guangxi); Mongolia (Övörkhangai*)	Potentially a carnosaur	
Propanoplosaurus	Ray Stanford; David B. Weishampel; Valerie B. Deleon	2011	Patuxent Formation (Early Cretaceous, Aptian)	United States (Maryland)	Only known from the imprints of a neonate skeleton	
Propterodactylus	Frederik Spindler	2024	Painten Formation (Late Jurassic, Tithonian)	Germany (Bavaria)	Before its formal description, it had been nicknamed the "Painten pro-pterodactyloid"	
Prosaurolophus	Barnum Brown	1916	Dinosaur Park Formation (Late Cretaceous, Campanian)*; Two Medicine Formation (Late Cretaceous, Campanian)	Canada (Alberta*); United States (Montana)	Had a relatively large head for a hadrosaur	
Protarchaeopteryx	Qiang Ji; Shu-An Ji	1997	Yixian Formation (Early Cretaceous, Barremian)	China (Liaoning)	Usually thought to be a basal oviraptorosaur but one study suggests a basal position within Pennaraptora	
Protathlitis	Andrés Santos-Cubedo; Carlos de Santisteban; Begoña Poza; Sergi Meseguer	2023	Arcillas de Morella Formation (Early Cretaceous, Barremian)	Spain (Valencia)	Described as a basal baryonychine spinosaurid, but a recent study suggested the type material may be chimeric, regarding this genus as probably dubious	
Protoceratops	Walter W. Granger; William K. Gregory	1923	Bayan Mandahu Formation (Late Cretaceous, Campanian); Djadokhta Formation (Late Cretaceous, Campanian)*	China (Inner Mongolia); Mongolia (Ömnögovi*)	Its remains are so abundant that it has been nicknamed the "sheep of the Cretaceous"	
Protognathosaurus	George Olshevsky	1991	Xiashaximiao Formation (Middle Jurassic to Late Jurassic, Bathonian to Oxfordian)	China (Sichuan)	Originally named Protognathus, but that name is preoccupied by a beetle	
Protohadros	Jason J. Head	1998	Lewisville Formation (Late Cretaceous, Cenomanian)	United States (Texas)	Possessed a downturned jaw which may be an adaptation to grazing on low-growing plants	
Protopteryx	Fucheng Zhang; Zhonghe Zhou	2000	Huajiying Formation (Early Cretaceous, Hauterivian)	China (Hebei)	One of the oldest and most primitive enantiornitheans	
Psittacosaurus	Henry F. Osborn	1923	Andakhuduk Formation (Early Cretaceous, Barremian); Ejinhoro Formation (Early Cretaceous, Barremian); Ilek Formation (Early Cretaceous, Barremian to Aptian); Jiufotang Formation (Early Cretaceous, Aptian); Khok Kruat Formation (Early Cretaceous, Aptian); Khuren Dukh Formation (Early Cretaceous, Aptian to Albian)*; Qingshan Formation (Early Cretaceous, Barremian to Albian); Tugulu Group (Early Cretaceous, Aptian to Albian); Xinminbao Group (Early Cretaceous, Barremian to Aptian); Xinpongnaobao Formation (Early Cretaceous, Barremian to Aptian); Yixian Formation (Early Cretaceous, Barremian)	China (Gansu; Inner Mongolia; Liaoning; Shandong; Xinjiang); Mongolia (Bayankhongor; Dornogovi*); Russia (Kemerovo Oblast); Thailand (Chaiyaphum)	Known from hundreds of specimens, many of them well-preserved	
Pteranodon	Othniel C. Marsh	1876	Niobrara Formation (Late Cretaceous, Coniacian to Campanian)*; Pierre Shale (Late Cretaceous, Campanian)	United States (Kansas*; South Dakota; Wyoming)	The quintessential pterosaur, with a long toothless beak and a crest that varied in shape between species and sexes	
Pterodactylus	Georges Cuvier	1809	Altmühltal Formation (Late Jurassic, Tithonian)*; Torleite Formation (Late Jurassic, Kimmeridgian)	Germany (Bavaria)	The first pterosaur fossil ever found	
Pterodaustro	José F. Bonaparte	1970	Lagarcito Formation (Early Cretaceous, Albian)	Argentina (San Luis)	Had hundreds of bristle-like teeth taller than its jaws that formed a filter-feeding adaptation	
Pterofiltrus	Shunxing Jiang; Xiaolin Wang	2011	Yixian Formation (Early Cretaceous, Barremian)	China (Liaoning)	Possessed an extremely long snout with over a hundred teeth	
Pteropelyx	Edward D. Cope	1889	Judith River Formation (Late Cretaceous, Campanian)	United States (Montana)	Potentially synonymous with Corythosaurus, although this cannot be confirmed due to the lack of cranial remains	
Pterorhynchus	Stephen A. Czerkas; Qiang Ji	2002	Haifanggou Formation (Late Jurassic, Oxfordian)	China (Inner Mongolia)	Had an elongated version of the vane present in other long-tailed pterosaurs	
Pterospondylus	Otto Jaekel	1914	Trossingen Formation (Late Triassic, Norian to Rhaetian)	Germany (Saxony-Anhalt)	Known from only a single, large vertebra	
Pterygornis	Min Wang; Han Hu; Zhiheng Li	2016	Jiufotang Formation (Early Cretaceous, Aptian)	China (Liaoning)	One disarticulated skeleton from this genus possesses well-preserved bones of the skull, including a quadratojugal	
Puertasaurus	Fernando E. Novas; Leonardo Salgado; Jorge O. Calvo; Federico L. Agnolín	2005	Cerro Fortaleza Formation (Late Cretaceous, Campanian to Maastrichtian)	Argentina (Santa Cruz)	Large but only known from very few remains	
Pukyongosaurus	Zhiming Dong; In-Sung Paik; Hyun-Joo Kim	2001	Hasandong Formation (Early Cretaceous, Aptian to Albian)	South Korea (South Gyeongsang)	One of its caudal vertebrae has bite marks caused by theropod teeth	
Pulanesaura	Blair W. McPhee; Matthew F. Bonnan; Adam M. Yates; Johann Neveling; Jonah N. Choiniere	2015	Upper Elliot Formation (Early Jurassic, Sinemurian to Pliensbachian)	South Africa (Free State)	A low browser that lacked the extremely long neck of later sauropods	
Punatitan	E. Martín Hechenleitner; Léa Leuzinger; Agustín G. Martinelli; Sebastián Rocher; Lucas E. Fiorelli; Jeremías R. A. Taborda; Leonardo Salgado	2020	Ciénaga del Río Huaco Formation (Late Cretaceous, Campanian to Maastrichtian)	Argentina (La Rioja)	Contemporary with Bravasaurus but was most likely distantly related	
Puntanipterus	José F. Bonaparte; Teresa M. Sánchez	1975	La Cruz Formation (Early Cretaceous, Aptian)	Argentina (San Luis)	Has been considered either a dsungaripterid or a synonym of Pterodaustro	
Pycnonemosaurus	Alexander W. A. Kellner; Diogenes A. Campos	2002	Cachoeira do Bom Jardim Formation (Late Cretaceous, Campanian to Maastrichtian)	Brazil (Mato Grosso)	Potentially the largest known abelisaurid	
Pyroraptor	Ronan Allain; Philippe Taquet	2000	Argiles et Grès à Reptiles Formation (Late Cretaceous, Campanian)	France (Provence-Alpes-Côte d'Azur)	Its holotype specimen was exposed by a forest fire	
Qantassaurus	Thomas H. Rich; Patricia Vickers-Rich	1999	Strzelecki Group (Early Cretaceous, Barremian)	Australia (Victoria)	Distinguished from other contemporary ornithopods by its relatively short dentary	
Qianjiangsaurus	Hui Dai; Qingyu Ma; Can Xiong; Yu Lin; Hui Zeng; Chao Tan; Jun Wang; Yuguang Zhang; Hai Xing	2025	Zhengyang Formation (Late Cretaceous, Campanian to Maastrichtian)	China (Chongqing)	This taxon and Nanningosaurus are the only known hadrosauroids from southern China	
Qianlong	Fenglu Han; Yilun Yu; Shukang Zhang; Rong Zeng; Xinjin Wang; Huiyang Cai; Tianzhuang Wu; Yingfeng Wen; Sifu Cai; Chun Li; Rui Wu; Qi Zhao; Xing Xu	2024	Ziliujing Formation (Early Jurassic, Sinemurian to Toarcian)	China (Guizhou)	Associated with fossils of leathery eggs, the oldest of their kind in the world	
Qianzhousaurus	Junchang Lü; Laiping Yi; Stephen L. Brusatte; Ling Yang; Hua Li; Liu Chen	2014	Nanxiong Formation (Late Cretaceous, Maastrichtian)	China (Jiangxi)	Has been nicknamed "Pinocchio rex" on account of its elongated snout	
Qiaowanlong	Hailu You; Daqing Li	2009	Xiagou Formation (Early Cretaceous, Aptian)	China (Gansu)	Originally described as a brachiosaurid, but has since been reinterpreted as a euhelopodid	
Qijianglong	Lida Xing; Tetsuto Miyashita; Jianping Zhang; Daqing Li; Yong Ye; Toru Sekiya; Fengping Wang; Philip J. Currie	2015	Suining Formation (Late Jurassic, Tithonian)	China (Sichuan)	Has sometimes been considered to date from the Early Cretaceous	
Qiliania	Shu-An Ji; Jessie Atterholt; Jingmai K. O'Connor; Matthew C. Lamanna; Jerald D. Harris; Daqing Li; Hailu You; Peter Dodson	2011	Xiagou Formation (Early Cretaceous, Aptian)	China (Gansu)	The specific name, Q. graffini, is named after Greg Graffin from the band Bad Religion	
Qinglongopterus	Junchang Lü; David M. Unwin; Bo Zhao; Chunling Gao; Caizhi Shen	2012	Tiaojishan Formation (Late Jurassic, Oxfordian)	China (Hebei)	Similar to Rhamphorhynchus but with a smaller head and shorter wings	
Qingxiusaurus	Jinyou Mo; Chaolin Huang; Zhongru Zhao; Wei Wang; Xing Xu	2008	Nalong Basin (Late Cretaceous, Maastrichtian)	China (Guangxi)	Known from very limited remains	
Qinlingosaurus	Xingxu Xue; Yunxiang Zhang; Xianwu Bi	1996	Hongtuling Formation (Late Cretaceous, Maastrichtian)	China (Shaanxi)	Similarities have been noted with titanosaurs, but its inclusion in this clade cannot be confirmed	
Qinornis	Xiangxu Xue	1995	Fangou Formation (Paleocene, Danian)	China (Shaanxi)	Potentially the first non-crown group bird to be recognized in the Paleogene, hence its inclusion in this otherwise Mesozoic list	
Qiupalong	Li Xu; Yoshitsugu Kobayashi; Junchang Lü; Yuong-Nam Lee; Yongqing Liu; Kohei Tanaka; Xingliao Zhang; Songhai Jia; Jiming Zhang	2011	Qiupa Formation (Late Cretaceous, Maastrichtian)	China (Henan)	Referred specimens were found in Canada and Russia, making it one of the few Late Cretaceous non-avian dinosaur taxa known from both Asia and Laramidia	
Qiupanykus	Junchang Lü; Li Xu; Huali Chang; Songhai Jia; Jiming Zhang; Diansong Gao; Yiyang Zhang; Chengjun Zhang; Fang Ding	2018	Qiupa Formation (Late Cretaceous, Maastrichtian)	China (Henan)	May have used its robust thumb claws to crack open oviraptorid eggshells	
Quaesitosaurus	Sergei M. Kurzanov; Alexander F. Bannikov	1983	Baruungoyot Formation (Late Cretaceous, Maastrichtian)	Mongolia (Ömnögovi)	Potentially a close relative of Nemegtosaurus	
Quetecsaurus	Bernardo J. González Riga; Leonardo D. Ortíz David	2014	Lisandro Formation (Late Cretaceous, Turonian)	Argentina (Mendoza)	Its humerus has a unique shape	
Quetzalcoatlus	Douglas A. Lawson	1975	Javelina Formation (Late Cretaceous, Maastrichtian)	United States (Texas)	The first gigantic azhdarchid discovered	
Quilmesaurus	Rodolfo A. Coria	2001	Allen Formation (Late Cretaceous, Maastrichtian)	Argentina (Río Negro)	Had proportionally robust legs despite its small size	
Qunkasaura	Pedro Mocho; Fernando Escaso; Fátima Marcos-Fernández; Adrián Páramo; José Luis Sanz; Daniel Vidal; Francisco Ortega	2024	Villalba de la Sierra Formation (Late Cretaceous, Campanian to Maastrichtian)	Spain (Castilla-La Mancha)	May have been closely related to Abditosaurus	
Radiodactylus	Brian Andres; Timothy S. Myers	2012	Glen Rose Formation (Early Cretaceous, Albian)	United States (Texas)	Found during the construction of a spillway for a nuclear power plant	
Raeticodactylus	Rico Stecher	2008	Kössen Formation (Late Triassic, Rhaetian)	Switzerland (Grisons)	Possibly a junior synonym of Caviramus	
Rahiolisaurus	Fernando Emilio Novas; Sankar Chatterjee; Dhiraj K. Rudra; P. M. Datta	2010	Lameta Formation (Late Cretaceous, Maastrichtian)	India (Gujarat)	Remains of multiple growth stages are known	
Rahonavis	Catherine A. Forster; Scott D. Sampson; Luis M. Chiappe; David W. Krause	1998	Maevarano Formation (Late Cretaceous, Maastrichtian)	Madagascar (Boeny)	Has been variously suggested to be a dromaeosaurid (possibly an unenlagiine), an avialan, or outside both groups	
Rajasaurus	Jeffrey A. Wilson; Paul C. Sereno; Suresh Srivastava; Devendra K. Bhatt; Ashu Khosla; Ashok Sahni	2003	Lameta Formation (Late Cretaceous, Maastrichtian)	India (Gujarat)	Possessed a single, short horn on its forehead that may have been used for display and head-butting	
Rapator	Friedrich von Huene	1932	Griman Creek Formation (Early Cretaceous to Late Cretaceous, Albian to Cenomanian)	Australia (New South Wales)	Known from only a metacarpal	
Rapaxavis	Eric M. Morschhauser; David J. Varricchio; Chuling Gao; Jinyuan Liu; Xuri Wang; Xiadong Cheng; Qingjin Meng	2009	Jiufotang Formation (Early Cretaceous, Aptian)	China (Liaoning)	Specialized for perching due to the structure of its feet	
Rapetosaurus	Kristina Curry Rogers; Catherine A. Forster	2001	Maevarano Formation (Late Cretaceous, Maastrichtian)	Madagascar (Boeny)	Known from almost the entire skeleton, including the skull	
Raptorex	Paul C. Sereno; Lin Tan; Stephen L. Brusatte; Henry J. Kriegstein; Xijin Zhao; Karen Cloward	2009	Nemegt Formation (Late Cretaceous, Maastrichtian)	Mongolia (Ömnögovi)	Described as a small adult tyrannosaur from the Early Cretaceous of China, but restudy of the sediments it was buried in suggested it was from the Late Cretaceous of Mongolia instead	
Ratchasimasaurus	Masateru Shibata; Pratueng Jintasakul; Yoichi Azuma	2011	Khok Kruat Formation (Early Cretaceous, Aptian)	Thailand (Nakhon Ratchasima)	Only known from a single toothless dentary	
Rativates	Bradley McFeeters; Michael J. Ryan; Claudia Schröder-Adams; Thomas M. Cullen	2016	Dinosaur Park Formation (Late Cretaceous, Campanian)	Canada (Alberta)	Originally described as a specimen of Struthiomimus	
Rayososaurus	José F. Bonaparte	1996	Candeleros Formation (Late Cretaceous, Cenomanian)	Argentina (Neuquén)	Very similar to Rebbachisaurus despite being only known from scant remains	
Rebbachisaurus	René J. M. Lavocat	1954	Aoufous Formation (Late Cretaceous, Cenomanian)	Morocco (Drâa-Tafilalet)	Carried a row of elongated neural spines, which would have supported a ridge or low sail on its back	
Regaliceratops	Caleb M. Brown; Donald M. Henderson	2015	St. Mary River Formation (Late Cretaceous, Maastrichtian)	Canada (Alberta)	Possessed a series of large, pentagonal plates lining its frill	
Regnosaurus	Gideon A. Mantell	1848	Tunbridge Wells Sand Formation (Early Cretaceous, Valanginian)	England (West Sussex)	Potentially a stegosaur similar to Huayangosaurus	
Rhabdodon	Philippe Matheron	1869	Marnes Rouges Inférieures Formation (Late Cretaceous, Maastrichtian)	France (Occitania)	Although most rhabdodontids are insular dwarfs, this genus may represent an instance of island gigantism as it is much larger than other members of its family	
Rhadinosaurus	Harry G. Seeley	1881	Grünbach Formation (Late Cretaceous, Campanian)	Austria (Lower Austria)	Suggested to be synonymous with Struthiosaurus, but it might have been a crocodilian instead	
Rhamphinion	Kevin Padian	1984	Kayenta Formation (Early Jurassic, Sinemurian to Toarcian)	United States (Arizona)	Has been noted to be similar to Dimorphodon	
Rhamphorhynchus	Hermann von Meyer	1846	Altmühltal Formation (Late Jurassic, Tithonian)*; Kimmeridge Clay (Late Jurassic, Kimmeridgian); Nusplingen Limestone (Late Jurassic, Kimmeridgian); Torleite Formation (Late Jurassic, Kimmeridgian)	England (Dorset); Germany (Baden-Württemberg); Bavaria*)	The first long-tailed pterosaur ever discovered	
Rhinorex	Terry A. Gates; Rodney Scheetz	2014	Neslen Formation (Late Cretaceous, Campanian)	United States (Utah)	Phylogenetic analysis shows that it may fall within Gryposaurus	
Rhoetosaurus	Heber A. Longman	1926	Walloon Coal Measures (Late Jurassic, Oxfordian)	Australia (Queensland)	Retains four claws on its hind feet, a basal trait	
Rhomaleopakhus	Paul Upchurch; Philip D. Mannion; Xing Xu; Paul M. Barrett	2021	Kalaza Formation (Late Jurassic, Xinjiang)	China (Xinjiang)	Possessed a robust forelimb that may be a locomotory adaptation	
Riabininohadros	Alexey V. Lopatin; Alexander O. Averianov	2020	Unnamed Crimean formation (Late Cretaceous, Maastrichtian)	Russia; Ukraine (Crimea)	Possessed a femur so unique it has no morphological equivalents across all of Iguanodontia	
Richardoestesia	Philip J. Currie; John Keith Rigby Jr.; Robert E. Sloan	1990	Aguja Formation (Late Cretaceous, Campanian); Dinosaur Park Formation (Late Cretaceous, Campanian)*	Canada (Alberta*); United States (Texas)	Teeth assigned to this genus have been recovered all around the world, in deposits spanning from the Jurassic to the Cretaceous, although they may not represent a single taxon	
Rinchenia	Rinchen Barsbold	1997	Nemegt Formation (Late Cretaceous, Maastrichtian)	Mongolia (Ömnögovi)	Had a tall, domed crest	
Rinconsaurus	Jorge O. Calvo; Bernardo J. González Riga	2003	Bajo de la Carpa Formation (Late Cretaceous, Santonian)	Argentina (Neuquén)	Unusually, its caudal vertebrae had a repeating pattern of procoely, amphicoely, opisthocoely, and biconvex states	
Riojasaurus	José F. Bonaparte	1969	Los Colorados Formation (Late Triassic, Norian)	Argentina (La Rioja)	Although commonly depicted as quadrupedal, the structure of its shoulder girdle suggests it may have potentially been bipedal	
Riojavenatrix	Erik Isasmendi; Elena Cuesta; Ignacio Díaz-Martínez; Julio Company; Patxi Sáez-Benito; Luis I. Viera; Angelica Torices; Xabier Pereda-Suberbiola	2024	Enciso Group (Early Cretaceous, Barremian to Aptian)	Spain (La Rioja)	Originally identified as a specimen of Baryonyx	
Riparovenator	Chris T. Barker; David W. E. Hone; Darren Naish; Andrea Cau; Jeremy A. F. Lockwood; Brian Foster; Claire E. Clarkin; Philipp Schneider; Neil J. Gostling	2021	Wessex Formation (Early Cretaceous, Barremian)	England (Isle of Wight)	Had elongated spines projecting from its caudal vertebrae somewhat similar to those of Spinosaurus	
Rocasaurus	Leonardo Salgado; Claudia Azpilicueta	2000	Allen Formation (Late Cretaceous, Maastrichtian)	Argentina (Río Negro)	Small for a sauropod yet was very robust	
Ruehleia	Peter M. Galton	2001	Trossingen Formation (Late Triassic, Norian to Rhaetian)	Germany (Thuringia)	Known from a single, nearly complete skeleton	
Rugocaudia	D. Cary Woodruff	2012	Cloverly Formation (Early Cretaceous, Albian)	United States (Montana)	Some of this genus' remains include several caudal vertebrae	
Rugops	Paul C. Sereno; Jeffrey A. Wilson; Jack L. Conrad	2004	Echkar Formation (Early Cretaceous to Late Cretaceous, Albian to Cenomanian)	Niger (Agadez)	Preserves two rows of holes on the top of its skull, which may have anchored a display structure or an armor-like dermis	
Ruixinia	Jinyou Mo; Feimin Ma; Yilun Yu; Xing Xu	2023	Yixian Formation (Early Cretaceous, Barremian)	China (Liaoning)	Its last few caudal vertebrae were fused into a rod-like structure	
Rukwatitan	Eric Gorscak; Patrick M. O'Connor; Nancy J. Stevens; Eric M. Roberts	2014	Galula Formation (Late Cretaceous, Campanian)	Tanzania (Songwe)	One of the few titanosaurs known from central Africa, filling in a gap in their evolutionary history	
Ruyangosaurus	Junchang Lü; Li Xu; Songhai Jia; Xingliao Zhang; Jiming Zhang; Lili Yang; Hailu You; Qiang Ji	2009	Haoling Formation (Early Cretaceous, Aptian to Albian)	China (Henan)	Only known from scant remains but it was one of the largest dinosaurs known from Asia	
Sacisaurus	Jorge Ferigolo; Max C. Langer	2007	Caturrita Formation (Late Triassic, Norian)	Brazil (Rio Grande do Sul)	Only one left femur was found in a bonebed despite the presence of thirty-five right ones	
Sahaliyania	Pascal Godefroit; Shulin Hai; Tingxiang Yu; Pascaline Lauters	2008	Yuliangze Formation (Late Cretaceous, Maastrichtian)	China (Heilongjiang)	Possibly a synonym of Amurosaurus	
Saichania	Teresa Maryańska	1977	Baruungoyot Formation (Late Cretaceous, Maastrichtian)	Mongolia (Ömnögovi)	Possessed complicated nasal passages that may have cooled the air it breathed	
Saltasaurus	José F. Bonaparte; Jaime E. Powell	1980	Lecho Formation (Late Cretaceous, Maastrichtian)	Argentina (Salta)	Possessed osteoderms in the form of large round nodules connected by a mass of smaller plates	
Saltopus	Friedrich von Huene	1910	Lossiemouth Sandstone (Late Triassic, Carnian to Norian)	Scotland (Moray)	Has been variously identified as a basal dinosaur or just outside the group	
Saltriovenator	Cristiano Dal Sasso; Simone Maganuco; Andrea Cau	2018	Moltrasio Formation (Early Jurassic, Sinemurian)	Italy (Lombardy)	The biggest theropod from the Early Jurassic yet known	
Samrukia	Darren Naish; Gareth Dyke; Andrea Cau; François Escuillié; Pascal Godefroit	2012	Bostobe Formation (Late Cretaceous, Santonian to Campanian)	Kazakhstan (Kyzylorda)	Originally described as a giant bird but was quickly reinterpreted as a pterosaur	
Sanjuansaurus	Oscar A. Alcober; Ricardo N. Martínez	2010	Ischigualasto Formation (Late Triassic, Carnian to Norian)	Argentina (San Juan)	Coexisted with Herrerasaurus but most likely represents a separate taxon	
Sanpasaurus	Zhongjian Yang	1944	Ziliujing Formation (Early Jurassic, Sinemurian to Toarcian)	China (Sichuan)	Historically conflated with the remains of an ornithischian	
Santanadactylus	Paul H. de Buisonjé	1980	Romualdo Formation (Early Cretaceous, Albian)	Brazil (Ceará)	Several species have been assigned to this genus, but it is unclear if they were all related	
Santanaraptor	Alexander W. A. Kellner	1999	Romualdo Formation (Early Cretaceous, Albian)	Brazil (Ceará)	Preserves soft tissues including the remains of skin, muscle, and possibly blood vessels	
Sanxiasaurus	Ning Li; Hui Dai; Chao Tan; Xufeng Hu; Zhaoying Wei; Yu Lin; Guangbiao Wei; Deliang Li; Li Meng; Baoqiao Hao; Hailu You; Guangzhao Peng	2021	Xintiangou Formation (Early Jurassic to Middle Jurassic, Toarcian to Aalenian)	China (Chongqing)	One of the oldest neornithischians known from Asia	
Sapeornis	Zhonghe Zhou; Fucheng Zhang	2002	Jiufotang Formation (Early Cretaceous, Aptian)*; Yixian Formation (Early Cretaceous, Barremian)	China (Liaoning)	A large primitive bird that may have been adapted for soaring in open environments	
Sarahsaurus	Timothy B. Rowe; Hans-Dieter Sues; Robert R. Reisz	2011	Kayenta Formation (Early Jurassic, Sinemurian to Toarcian)	United States (Arizona)	Possessed strong hands which may indicate a feeding specialization	
Sarcolestes	Richard Lydekker	1893	Oxford Clay (Middle Jurassic, Callovian)	England (Cambridgeshire)	Originally misidentified as a carnivorous dinosaur	
Sarcosaurus	Charles W. Andrews	1921	Scunthorpe Mudstone (Early Jurassic, Hettangian to Sinemurian)	England (Leicestershire)	Has been variously suggested to be in different positions at the base of Neotheropoda	
Sarmientosaurus	Rubén D. F. Martínez; Matthew C. Lamanna; Fernardo E. Novas; Ryan C. Ridgely; Gabriel A. Casal; Javier E. Martínez; Javier R. Vita; Lawrence M. Witmer	2016	Bajo Barreal Formation (Late Cretaceous, Cenomanian to Turonian)	Argentina (Chubut)	Analysis of its inner ear suggests it held its head downwards, possibly indicating a preference for low-growing plants	
Sasayamagnomus	Tomonori Tanaka; Kentaro Chiba; Tadahiro Ikeda; Michael J. Ryan	2024	Ohyamashimo Formation (Early Cretaceous, Albian)	Japan (Hyōgo)	At least two individuals are known as indicated by the presence of two right nasal bones among the fossil material	
Saturnalia	Max C. Langer; Fernando Abdala; Martha Richter; Michael J. Benton	1999	Candelária Sequence (Late Triassic, Carnian)	Brazil (Rio Grande do Sul)	Known from at least three partial skeletons	
Saurolophus	Barnum Brown	1912	Horseshoe Canyon Formation (Late Cretaceous, Maastrichtian)*; Nemegt Formation (Late Cretaceous, Maastrichtian)	Canada (Alberta*); Mongolia (Ömnögovi)	Had a short, solid crest whose direction varied between species	
Sauroniops	Andrea Cau; Fabio M. Dalla Vecchia; Matteo Fabbri	2013	Gara Sbaa Formation (Late Cretaceous, Cenomanian)	Morocco (Drâa-Tafilalet)	Only known from a single thickened frontal	
Sauropelta	John H. Ostrom	1970	Cloverly Formation (Early Cretaceous, Albian)	United States (Montana*; Wyoming)	Its tail had at least forty vertebrae, making up half of its total body length	
Saurophaganax	Daniel J. Chure	1995	Morrison Formation (Late Jurassic, Kimmeridgian)	United States (Oklahoma)	Originally described as a large theropod, it was later suggested to be a chimera of sauropod and theropod bones, with the holotype bone possibly belonging to a sauropod	
Sauroplites	Birger Bohlin	1953	Zhidan Group (Early Cretaceous, Barremian to Aptian)	China (Gansu)	Preserved lying on its back with parts of its armor in an articulated position	
Sauroposeidon	Mathew J. Wedel; Richard L. Cifelli; Richard K. Sanders	2000	Antlers Formation (Early Cretaceous, Aptian); Cloverly Formation (Early Cretaceous, Albian); Glen Rose Formation (Early Cretaceous, Albian); Twin Mountains Formation (Early Cretaceous, Aptian)	United States (Oklahoma*; Texas; Wyoming)	Could raise its head up to the height of a six-story building	
Saurornithoides	Henry F. Osborn	1924	Djadokhta Formation (Late Cretaceous, Campanian)	Mongolia (Ömnögovi)	Its hindlimbs were well-developed even as juveniles, suggesting it needed little to no parental care	
Saurornitholestes	Hans-Dieter Sues	1978	Dinosaur Park Formation (Late Cretaceous, Campanian)*; Donoho Creek Formation (Late Cretaceous, Campanian); Kirtland Formation (Late Cretaceous, Campanian); Oldman Formation (Late Cretaceous, Campanian); Tar Heel/Coachman Formation (Late Cretaceous, Campanian)	Canada (Alberta*); United States (New Mexico; South Carolina)	One of the best-known North American dromaeosaurids	
Savannasaurus	Stephen F. Poropat; Philip D. Mannion; Paul Upchurch; Scott A. Hocknull; Benjamin P. Kear; Martin Kundrát; Travis R. Tischler; Trish Sloan; George H. K. Sinapius; Judy A. Elliott; David A. Elliott	2016	Winton Formation (Late Cretaceous, Cenomanian to Turonian)	Australia (Queensland)	May have spent more time near water than other sauropods	
Sazavis	Lev A. Nessov; Alexander A. Yarkov	1989	Bissekty Formation (Late Cretaceous, Turonian)	Uzbekistan (Navoiy)	Known only from a tibiotarsus	
Scansoriopteryx	Stephen A. Czerkas; Chongxi Yuan	2002	Haifanggou Formation (Late Jurassic, Oxfordian)	China (Liaoning)	Was well-adapted for climbing due to the structure of its hands and feet	
Scaphognathus	Johann A. Wagner	1861	Altmühltal Formation (Late Jurassic, Tithonian)*; Mörnsheim Formation (Late Jurassic, Tithonian)	Germany (Bavaria)	Feather impressions were discovered in the 19th century, but their presence was not confirmed until the development of modern imaging techniques	
Scelidosaurus	Richard Owen	1859	Charmouth Mudstone Formation (Early Jurassic, Sinemurian to Pliensbachian)	England (Dorset)	Carried hundreds of small osteoderms in several rows along its back	
Schizooura	Shuang Zhou; Zhonghe Zhou; Jingmai K. O'Connor	2012	Jiufotang Formation (Early Cretaceous, Aptian)	China (Liaoning)	Had a forked tail fan with a notch separating the tail feathers on both sides of the body	
Schleitheimia	Oliver W. M. Rauhut; Femke M. Holwerda; Heinz Furrer	2020	Klettgau Formation (Late Triassic, Carnian to Rhaetian)	Switzerland (Schaffhausen)	Possessed a relatively enlarged ilium	
Scipionyx	Cristiano Dal Sasso; Marco Signore	1998	Pietraroja Plattenkalk (Early Cretaceous, Albian)	Italy (Campania)	So well preserved that several internal organs and their positions in life could be accurately reconstructed	
Sciurumimus	Oliver W. M. Rauhut; Christian Foth; Helmut Tischlinger; Mark A. Norell	2012	Torleite Formation (Late Jurassic, Kimmeridgian)	Germany (Bavaria)	Had a bushy tail similar to that of a squirrel	
Scleromochlus	Arthur S. Woodward	1907	Lossiemouth Sandstone (Late Triassic, Carnian to Norian)	Scotland (Moray)	Possibly the most primitive known relative of pterosaurs	
Scolosaurus	Franz Nopcsa	1928	Dinosaur Park Formation (Late Cretaceous, Campanian)*; Oldman Formation (Late Cretaceous, Campanian)	Canada (Alberta)	Once widely believed to be synonymous with other Campanian ankylosaurids	
Scutellosaurus	Edwin H. Colbert	1981	Kayenta Formation (Early Jurassic, Sinemurian to Toarcian)	United States (Arizona)	Had hundreds of osteoderms arranged in rows along its back and tail	
Seazzadactylus	Fabio M. Dalla Vecchia	2019	Forni Dolostone (Late Triassic, Norian)	Italy (Friuli-Venezia Giulia)	Had multicusped dentition, rare among early pterosaurs	
Secernosaurus	Michael K. Brett-Surman	1979	Lago Colhué Huapí Formation (Late Cretaceous, Campanian to Maastrichtian)	Argentina (Chubut)	Would have lived in an arid gypsum desert	
Sefapanosaurus	Alejandro Otero; Emil Krupandan; Diego Pol; Anusuya Chinsamy; Jonah N. Choiniere	2015	Upper Elliot Formation (Early Jurassic, Sinemurian to Pliensbachian)	South Africa (Free State)	Had a distinctive cross-shaped astragalus	
Segisaurus	Charles L. Camp	1936	Navajo Sandstone (Early Jurassic, Hettangian to Sinemurian)	United States (Arizona)	Preserves evidence of a wishbone similar to that of modern birds	
Segnosaurus	Altangerel Perle	1979	Bayanshiree Formation (Late Cretaceous, Cenomanian to Coniacian)	Mongolia (Ömnögovi)	One of the first known therizinosaurs, originally of obscure relationships	
Seitaad	Joseph J. W. Sertich; Mark A. Loewen	2010	Navajo Sandstone (Early Jurassic, Hettangian to Sinemurian)	United States (Utah)	The holotype may have died when a sand dune collapsed on it	
Sektensaurus	Lucio M. Ibiricu; Gabriel A. Casal; Rubén D. Martínez; Marcelo Luna; Juan I. Canale; Bruno N. Álvarez; Bernardo J. González Riga	2019	Lago Colhué Huapí Formation (Late Cretaceous, Campanian to Maastrichtian)	Argentina (Chubut)	The first non-hadrosaurid ornithopod recovered from central Patagonia	
Serendipaceratops	Thomas H. Rich; Patricia Vickers-Rich	2003	Strzelecki Group (Early Cretaceous, Barremian)	Australia (Victoria)	Possessed a robust ulna similar to that of ceratopsians and ankylosaurs, but was likely a member of the latter group	
Sericipterus	Brian Andres; James M. Clark; Xing Xu	2010	Shishugou Formation (Middle Jurassic to Late Jurassic, Callovian to Oxfordian)	China (Xinjiang)	Had sharply pointed, recurved teeth	
Serikornis	Ulysse Lefèvre; Andrea Cau; Aude Cincotta; Dongyu Hu; Anusuya Chinsamy; François Escuillié; Pascal Godefroit	2017	Tiaojishan Formation (Late Jurassic, Oxfordian)	China (Liaoning)	Possessed simple, wispy feathers similar to those of a Silkie chicken	
Serradraco	Stanislas Rigal; David M. Martill; Steven C. Sweetman	2018	Tunbridge Wells Sand Formation (Early Cretaceous, Valanginian)	England (East Sussex)	Has been considered a species of Lonchodectes	
Shamosaurus	Tatyana A. Tumanova	1983	Dzunbain Formation (Early Cretaceous, Aptian to Albian)	Mongolia (Dornogovi)	The osteoderms on its head were not separated into obvious tiles as with later ankylosaurids	
Shanag	Alan H. Turner; Sunny H. Hwang; Mark A. Norell	2007	Öösh Formation (Early Cretaceous, Berriasian to Barremian)	Mongolia (Övörkhangai)	Shows a mixture of traits of various paravian groups	
Shangyang	Min Wang; Zhonghe Zhou	2019	Jiufotang Formation (Early Cretaceous, Aptian)	China (Liaoning)	Unusually, the premaxillae of this genus were fused	
Shantungosaurus	Chengzhi Hu	1973	Wangshi Group (Late Cretaceous, Campanian)	China (Shandong)	The largest known hadrosaurid	
Shanweiniao	Jingmai K. O'Connor; Xuri Wang; Luis M. Chiappe; Chunling Gao; Qingjin Meng; Xiaodong Cheng; Jinyuan Liu	2009	Yixian Formation (Early Cretaceous, Barremian)	China (Liaoning)	Acquired multiple tail feathers which may have been capable of generating lift as in modern birds	
Shanxia	Paul M. Barrett; Hailu You; Paul Upchurch; Alex C. Burton	1998	Huiquanpu Formation (Late Cretaceous, Campanian to Maastrichtian)	China (Shanxi)	May be synonymous with Tianzhenosaurus and/or Saichania	
Shanyangosaurus	Xingxu Xue; Yunxiang Zhang; Xianwu Bi	1996	Shanyang Formation (Late Cretaceous, Maastrichtian)	China (Shaanxi)	Indeterminate but its hollow bones are a synapomorphy for the Coelurosauria	
Shaochilong	Stephen L. Brusatte; Roger B.J. Benson; Daniel J. Chure; Xing Xu; Corwin Sullivan; David W. E. Hone	2009	Miaogou Formation (Early Cretaceous, Aptian to Albian)	China (Inner Mongolia)	Originally interpreted as a carcharodontosaurid, but more recent analyses recover it as a potential tyrannosauroid	
Shengjingornis	Li Li; Jinqi Wang; Xi Zhang; Shilin Hou	2012	Jiufotang Formation (Early Cretaceous, Aptian)	China (Liaoning)	A large longipterygid	
Shenqiornis	Xuri Wang; Jingmai K. O'Connor; Bo Zhao; Luis M. Chiappe; Chunling Gao; Xiaodong Cheng	2010	Huajiying Formation (Early Cretaceous, Hauterivian)	China (Hebei)	Preserves a large postorbital bone	
Shenzhoupterus	Junchang Lü; David M. Unwin; Xu Li; Xingliao Zhang	2008	Jiufotang Formation (Early Cretaceous, Aptian)	China (Liaoning)	Had a crest that stretched from over the eyes to the back of the head	
Shenzhousaurus	Qiang Ji; Mark A. Norell; Peter Juraj Makovicky; Ke-Qin Gao; Shu-An Ji; Chongxi Yuan	2003	Yixian Formation (Early Cretaceous, Barremian)	China (Liaoning)	Preserves pebbles in its thoracic cavity which may be gastroliths	
Shidaisaurus	Xiao-Chun Wu; Philip J. Currie; Zhiming Dong; Shigang Pan; Tao Wang	2009	Chuanjie Formation (Middle Jurassic, Aalenian to Bajocian)	China (Yunnan)	Potentially one of the oldest known allosauroids	
Shingopana	Eric Gorscak; Patrick M. O'Connor; Eric M. Roberts; Nancy J. Stevens	2017	Galula Formation (Late Cretaceous, Campanian)	Tanzania (Songwe)	Most closely related to South American titanosaurs	
Shishugounykus	Zichuan Qin; James M. Clark; Jonah N. Choiniere; Xing Xu	2019	Shishugou Formation (Middle Jurassic to Late Jurassic, Callovian to Oxfordian)	China (Xinjiang)	Its manus combines features of both alvarezsaurians and more basal coelurosaurs	
Shixinggia	Junchang Lü; Baokun Zhang	2005	Pingling Formation (Late Cretaceous, Maastrichtian)	China (Guangdong)	Known from a fair amount of postcranial material	
Shri	Alan H. Turner; Shaena Montanari; Mark A. Norell	2021	Baruungoyot Formation (Late Cretaceous, Maastrichtian)*; Djadokhta Formation (Late Cretaceous, Campanian)	Mongolia (Ömnögovi)	Before its formal description, the type species was nicknamed "Ichabodcraniosaurus" because its holotype lacked a skull	
Shuangbaisaurus	Guofu Wang; Hai-Lu You; Shigang Pan; Tao Wang	2017	Fengjiahe Formation (Early Jurassic, Pliensbachian)	China (Yunnan)	May be an individual variation of Sinosaurus	
Shuangmiaosaurus	Hailu You; Qiang Ji; Jinglu Li; Yinxian Li	2003	Sunjiawan Formation (Late Cretaceous, Cenomanian)	China (Liaoning)	Only known from some parts of a skull	
Shuilingornis	Xuri Wang; Andrea Cau; Yinuo Wang; Martin Kundrát; Guili Zhang; Yichuan Liu; Luis M. Chiappe	2025	Jiufotang Formation (Early Cretaceous, Aptian)	China (Liaoning)	One of the oldest birds with semi-aquatic adaptations	
Shunosaurus	Zhiming Dong; Shiwu Zhou; Yihong Zhang	1983	Xiashaximiao Formation (Middle Jurassic to Late Jurassic, Bathonian to Oxfordian)	China (Sichuan)	Possessed a small tail club topped by two short spikes	
Shuvuuia	Luis M. Chiappe; Mark A. Norell; James M. Clark	1998	Djadokhta Formation (Late Cretaceous, Campanian)	Mongolia (Ömnögovi)	Has been claimed to display several adaptations that point to a nocturnal, owl-like lifestyle	
Siamodon	Eric Buffetaut; Varavudh Suteethorn	2011	Khok Kruat Formation (Early Cretaceous, Aptian)	Thailand (Nakhon Ratchasima)	May have been closely related to Probactrosaurus	
Siamosaurus	Eric Buffetaut; Rucha Ingavat	1986	Sao Khua Formation (Early Cretaceous, Valanginian to Hauterivian)	Thailand (Khon Kaen)	Only known from teeth, but spinosaurid postcrania from the same area may be referrable to this genus	
Siamotyrannus	Eric Buffetaut; Varavudh Suteethorn; Haiyan Tong	1996	Sao Khua Formation (Early Cretaceous, Valanginian to Hauterivian)	Thailand (Khon Kaen)	Has been recovered in a variety of positions within Avetheropoda	
Siamraptor	Duangsuda Chokchaloemwong; Soki Hattori; Elena Cuesta; Pratueng Jintasakul; Masateru Shibata; Yoichi Azuma	2019	Khok Kruat Formation (Early Cretaceous, Aptian)	Thailand (Nakhon Ratchasima)	Possibly the first carcharodontosaurian known from Southeast Asia	
Siats	Lindsay E. Zanno; Peter J. Makovicky	2013	Cedar Mountain Formation (Early Cretaceous to Late Cretaceous, Albian to Cenomanian)	United States (Utah)	Large but inconsistent in phylogenetic placement	
Sibirotitan	Alexander O. Averianov; Stepan Ivantsov; Pavel P. Skutschas; Alexey Faingertz; Sergey Leshchinsky	2018	Ilek Formation (Early Cretaceous, Barremian to Aptian)	Russia (Kemerovo Oblast)	Its sacral ribs are star-shaped in dorsal view	
Sidersaura	Lucas N. Lerzo; Pablo A. Gallina; Juan I. Canale; Alejandro Otero; José L. Carballido; Sebastián Apesteguía; Peter J. Makovicky	2025	Huincul Formation (Late Cretaceous, Cenomanian to Turonian)	Argentina (Neuquén)	One of the largest known rebbachisaurids	
Sierraceratops	Sebastian G. Dalman; Spencer G. Lucas; Steven E. Jasinski; Nicholas R. Longrich	2022	Hall Lake Formation (Late Cretaceous, Campanian to Maastrichtian)	United States (New Mexico)	May be part of a unique clade of chasmosaurine ceratopsids only known from southern Laramidia	
Sigilmassasaurus	Dale A. Russell	1996	Kem Kem Group (Late Cretaceous, Cenomanian)	Morocco (Drâa-Tafilalet)	Contemporary with Spinosaurus, but its status as a distinct genus and/or species is uncertain	
Silesaurus	Jerzy Dzik	2003	Drawno Beds (Late Triassic, Carnian)	Poland (Opole)	Has been considered an omnivore due to the herbivorous adaptations in its beak and referred coprolites showing insects	
Siluosaurus	Zhiming Dong	1997	Xinminbao Group (Early Cretaceous, Barremian to Aptian)	China (Gansu)	Has been suggested to be an indeterminate member of the Cerapoda	
Silutitan	Xiaolin Wang; Kamila L. N. Bandeira; Rui Qiu; Shunxing Jiang; Xin Cheng; Yingxia Ma; Alexander W. A. Kellner	2021	Shengjinkou Formation (Early Cretaceous, Valanginian)	China (Xinjiang)	Known from six cervical vertebrae associated with a pterosaur jaw	
Silvisaurus	Theodore H. Eaton Jr.	1960	Dakota Formation (Early Cretaceous to Late Cretaceous, Albian to Cenomanian)	United States (Kansas)	Hypothesized to live in a forested habitat	
Similicaudipteryx	Tao He; Xiaolin Wang; Zhonghe Zhou	2008	Jiufotang Formation (Early Cretaceous, Aptian)	China (Liaoning)	Had a short tail ending with a dagger-shaped pygostyle	
Similiyanornis	Min Wang; Zhiheng Li; Qingguo Liu; Zhonghe Zhou	2020	Jiufotang Formation (Early Cretaceous, Aptian)	China (Liaoning)	Known from a complete skeleton with feather impressions	
Simurghia	Nicholas R. Longrich; David M. Martill; Brian Andres	2018	Couche III (Late Cretaceous, Maastrichtian)	Morocco (Béni Mellal-Khénifra)	May include a species from Brazil	
Sinankylosaurus	Kebai Wang; Yanxia Zhang; Jun Chen; Shuqing Chen; Peiye Wang	2020	Wangshi Group (Late Cretaceous, Campanian)	China (Shandong)	Described as an ankylosaur but a recent study doubts this interpretation	
Sinocalliopteryx	Shu-An Ji; Qiang Ji; Junchang Lü; Chongxi Yuan	2007	Yixian Formation (Early Cretaceous, Barremian)	China (Liaoning)	Stomach contents indicate a possible preference for volant prey such as dromaeosaurids and early birds	
Sinocephale	David C. Evans; Caleb M. Brown; Hailu You; Nicolás E. Campione	2021	Ulansuhai Formation (Late Cretaceous, Turonian)	China (Inner Mongolia)	Originally named as a species of Troodon when that genus was thought to be a pachycephalosaur	
Sinoceratops	Xing Xu; Kebai Wang; Xijin Zhao; Dunjing Li	2010	Wangshi Group (Late Cretaceous, Campanian)	China (Shandong)	Possessed forward-curving hornlets and a series of low knobs on the top of the frill	
Sinocoelurus	Zhongjian Yang	1942	Kuangyuan Series (Late Jurassic, Oxfordian to Tithonian)	China (Sichuan)	One study considered it to be a potential plesiosaur	
Sinomacrops	Xuefang Wei; Rodrigo V. Pêgas; Caizhi Shen; Yanfang Guo; Waisum Ma; Deyu Sun; Xuanyu Zhou	2021	Tiaojishan Formation (Late Jurassic, Oxfordian)	China (Hebei)	Preserves some parts of the wing membrane	
Sinopterus	Xiaolin Wang; Zhonghe Zhou	2003	Jiufotang Formation (Early Cretaceous, Aptian)	China (Liaoning)	Direct dietary evidence shows that this genus was herbivorous	
Sinornis	Paul C. Sereno; Chenggang Rao	1992	Jiufotang Formation (Early Cretaceous, Aptian)	China (Liaoning)	One of the first Jehol biota enantiornitheans described	
Sinornithoides	Dale A. Russell; Zhiming Dong	1993	Ejinhoro Formation (Early Cretaceous, Barremian)	China (Inner Mongolia)	Preserved in a roosting position, with its head tucked underneath its left wing	
Sinornithomimus	Yoshitsugu Kobayashi; Junchang Lü	2003	Ulansuhai Formation (Late Cretaceous, Turonian)	China (Inner Mongolia)	Formed age-segregated herds as evidenced by a concentration of juvenile skeletons	
Sinornithosaurus	Xing Xu; Xiaolin Wang; Xiaochun Wu	1999	Yixian Formation (Early Cretaceous, Barremian)	China (Liaoning)	One specimen has grooved teeth, suggesting it was venomous	
Sinosauropteryx	Qiang Ji; Shu-An Ji	1996	Yixian Formation (Early Cretaceous, Barremian)	China (Liaoning)	The first non-avian dinosaur found with direct evidence of feathers	
Sinosaurus	Zhongjian Yang	1940	Lufeng Formation (Early Jurassic, Hettangian to Sinemurian)	China (Yunnan)	Had a pair of midline crests similar to Dilophosaurus	
Sinotyrannus	Qiang Ji; Shu-An Ji; Lijun Zhang	2009	Jiufotang Formation (Early Cretaceous, Aptian)	China (Liaoning)	Usually seen as a large proceratosaurid, but one study suggests it may represent a fully grown stage of the slightly older Huaxiagnathus	
Sinovenator	Xing Xu; Mark A. Norell; Xiaolin Wang; Peter J. Makovicky; Xiaochun Wu	2002	Yixian Formation (Early Cretaceous, Barremian)	China (Liaoning)	Some specimens are preserved three-dimensionally	
Sinraptor	Philip J. Currie; Xijin Zhao	1993	Shishugou Formation (Middle Jurassic to Late Jurassic, Callovian to Oxfordian)	China (Xinjiang)	May have used its teeth like blades to inflict deep wounds in prey	
Sinusonasus	Xing Xu; Xiaolin Wang	2004	Yixian Formation (Early Cretaceous, Barremian)	China (Liaoning)	Had distinctive sinusoid nasal bones	
Sirindhorna	Masateru Shibata; Pratueng Jintasakul; Yoichi Azuma; Hailu You	2015	Khok Kruat Formation (Early Cretaceous, Aptian)	Thailand (Nakhon Ratchasima)	Its fossils were discovered by corn farmers while digging a reservoir	
Siroccopteryx	Bryn J. Mader; Alexander W. A. Kellner	1999	Kem Kem Group (Late Cretaceous, Cenomanian)	Morocco (Drâa-Tafilalet)	Has been considered a synonym of Coloborhynchus	
Skiphosoura	David W. E. Hone; Adam Fitch; Stefan Selzer; René Lauer; Bruce Lauer	2024	Mörnsheim Formation (Late Jurassic, Tithonian)	Germany (Bavaria)	Fills a morphological and phylogenetic gap between basal and derived monofenestratans	
Skorpiovenator	Juan I. Canale; Carlos A. Scanferla; Federico L. Agnolín; Fernando E. Novas	2009	Huincul Formation (Late Cretaceous, Cenomanian to Turonian)	Argentina (Neuquén)	Had an unusually short, deep skull	
Smitanosaurus	John A. Whitlock; Jeffrey A. Wilson Mantilla	2020	Morrison Formation (Late Jurassic, Kimmeridgian to Tithonian)	United States (Colorado)	Only known from a partial skull and some vertebrae	
Songlingornis	Lianhai Hou	1997	Jiufotang Formation (Early Cretaceous, Aptian)	China (Liaoning)	May or may not be a close relative of Yanornis	
Sonidosaurus	Xing Xu; Xiaohong Zhang; Qingwei Tan; Xijin Zhao; Lin Tan	2006	Iren Dabasu Formation (Late Cretaceous, Turonian to Maastrichtian)	China (Inner Mongolia)	One of the smallest known titanosaurs	
Sonorasaurus	Ron Ratkevich	1998	Turney Ranch Formation (Early Cretaceous to Late Cretaceous, Albian to Cenomanian)	United States (Arizona)	State dinosaur of Arizona	
Sordes	Aleksandr G. Sharov	1971	Karabastau Formation (Middle Jurassic to Late Jurassic, Callovian to Kimmeridgian)	Kazakhstan (Jambyl)	Preserved with impressions of hair-like filaments	
Soriatitan	Rafael Royo-Torres; Carolina Fuentes-Vidarte; Manuel Meijide; Federico Meijide-Fuentes; Manuel Meijide-Fuentes	2017	Golmayo Formation (Early Cretaceous, Hauterivian to Barremian)	Spain (Castile and León)	The first confirmed brachiosaurid known from Early Cretaceous Europe	
Soroavisaurus	Luis M. Chiappe	1993	Lecho Formation (Late Cretaceous, Maastrichtian)	Argentina (Salta)	A very close relative of Avisaurus	
Soumyasaurus	Volkan Sarıgül; Federico L. Agnolín; Sankar Chatterjee	2018	Cooper Canyon Formation (Late Triassic, Norian)	United States (Texas)	Known from only an extremely small, fragmentary dentary	
Spectrovenator	Hussam Zaher; Diego Pol; Bruno A. Navarro; Rafael Delcourt; Alberto B. Carvalho	2020	Quiricó Formation (Early Cretaceous, Aptian)	Brazil (Minas Gerais)	Its holotype was found underneath a sauropod skeleton	
Sphaerotholus	Thomas E. Williamson; Thomas D. Carr	2003	Dinosaur Park Formation (Late Cretaceous, Campanian); Hell Creek Formation (Late Cretaceous, Maastrichtian); Horseshoe Canyon Formation (Late Cretaceous, Maastrichtian); Kirtland Formation (Late Cretaceous, Campanian)*	Canada (Alberta); United States (Montana; New Mexico*)	Five species have been named, all known from skull elements	
Spiclypeus	Jordan C. Mallon; Christopher J. Ott; Peter L. Larson; Edward M. Iuliano; David C. Evans	2016	Judith River Formation (Late Cretaceous, Campanian)	United States (Montana)	Has been described as "boldly audacious"	
Spicomellus	Susannah C.R. Maidment; Sarah J. Strachan; Driss Ouarhache; Torsten M. Scheyer; Emily E. Brown; Vincent Fernandez; Zerina Johanson; Thomas J. Raven; Paul M. Barrett	2021	El Mers III Formation (Middle Jurassic, Bathonian to Callovian)	Morocco (Fez-Meknes)	Uniquely, its osteoderms were fused directly to its ribs	
Spinophorosaurus	Kristian Remes; Francisco Ortega; Ignacio Fierro; Ulrich Joger; Ralf Kosma; José Manuel Marín Ferrer; Oumarou Amadou Ide; Abdoulaye Maga	2009	Irhazer Shale (Middle Jurassic, Bajocian to Bathonian)	Niger (Agadez)	Originally described as possessing a "thagomizer" similar to those of stegosaurs, but these turned out to be misidentified clavicles	
Spinops	Andrew A. Farke; Michael J. Ryan; Paul M. Barrett; Darren H. Tanke; Dennis R. Braman; Mark A. Loewen; Mark R. Graham	2011	Oldman Formation (Late Cretaceous, Campanian)	Canada (Alberta)	Described almost a century after its remains were collected	
Spinosaurus	Ernst Stromer	1915	Bahariya Formation (Late Cretaceous, Cenomanian)*; Douira Formation (Late Cretaceous, Cenomanian)	Egypt (Giza*); Morocco (Drâa-Tafilalet)	Possessed a myriad of features that have been suggested to be evidence of a semiaquatic lifestyle, including webbed feet and a paddle-like tail	
Spinostropheus	Paul C. Sereno; Jeffrey A. Wilson; Jack L. Conrad	2004	Tiourarén Formation (Middle Jurassic to Late Jurassic, Bathonian to Oxfordian)	Niger (Agadez)	Although often considered a close relative of Elaphrosaurus, these inferences are based on a specimen that cannot actually be referred to this genus	
Spondylosoma	Friedrich von Huene	1942	Pinheiros-Chiniquá Sequence (Late Triassic, Carnian)	Brazil (Rio Grande do Sul)	Originally believed to be a basal dinosaur but was more likely a primitive bird-line archosaur	
Staurikosaurus	Edwin H. Colbert	1970	Candelária Sequence (Late Triassic, Carnian)	Brazil (Rio Grande do Sul)	May have been a rare component of its environment as only two specimens are known	
Stegoceras	Lawrence M. Lambe	1902	Dinosaur Park Formation (Late Cretaceous, Campanian)	Canada (Alberta)	May have been an indiscriminate bulk-feeder due to the shape of its snout	
Stegopelta	Samuel W. Williston	1905	Frontier Formation (Late Cretaceous, Cenomanian to Coniacian)	United States (Wyoming)	May have possessed a sacral shield similar to other nodosaurids	
Stegosaurides	Birger Bohlin	1953	Xinminbao Group (Early Cretaceous, Barremian to Aptian)	China (Gansu)	A thyreophoran of uncertain phylogenetic position	
Stegosaurus	Othniel C. Marsh	1877	Morrison Formation (Late Jurassic, Kimmeridgian)	United States (Colorado*; Wyoming)	Had a single alternating row of large, kite-shaped plates	
Stegouros	Sergio Soto-Acuña; Alexander O. Vargas; Jonatan Kaluza; Marcelo A. Leppe; Joao F. Botelho; José Palma-Liberona; Carolina Simon-Gutstein; Roy A. Fernández; Héctor Ortiz; Verónica Milla; Bárbara Aravena; Leslie M. E. Manríquez; Jhonatan Alarcón-Muñoz; Juan P. Pino; Cristine Trevisan; Héctor Mansilla; Luis F. Hinojosa; Vicente Muñoz-Walther; David Rubilar-Rogers	2021	Dorotea Formation (Late Cretaceous, Maastrichtian)	Chile (Magallanes)	Possessed a "macuahuitl" at the end of its tail, made of a connected "frond" of pointed osteoderms	
Stellasaurus	John P. Wilson; Michael J. Ryan; David C. Evans	2020	Two Medicine Formation (Late Cretaceous, Campanian)	United States (Montana)	Possessed an enlarged, thickened nasal horn	
Stenonychosaurus	Charles M. Sternberg	1932	Dinosaur Park Formation (Late Cretaceous, Campanian)	Canada (Alberta)	Possibly synonymous with Troodon	
Stenopelix	Hermann von Meyer	1857	Obernkirchen Sandstein (Early Cretaceous, Berriasian)	Germany (Lower Saxony)	Possibly closely related to basal ceratopsians from Late Jurassic China	
Stephanosaurus	Lawrence M. Lambe	1914	Dinosaur Park Formation (Late Cretaceous, Campanian)	Canada (Alberta)	A poorly known hadrosaurid	
Stokesosaurus	James H. Madsen	1974	Morrison Formation (Late Jurassic, Tithonian)	United States (Utah)	Only known from a few remains but they are enough to tell that it was a tyrannosauroid	
Streptospondylus	Hermann von Meyer	1832	Marnes de Dives (Middle Jurassic, Callovian)	France (Normandy)	Originally believed to represent a marine crocodile	
Struthiomimus	Henry F. Osborn	1917	Oldman Formation (Late Cretaceous, Campanian)	Canada (Alberta)	Known from many specimens, indicating it was a common animal	
Struthiosaurus	Emanuel Bunzel	1871	Argiles et Grès à Reptiles Formation (Late Cretaceous, Campanian); Grünbach Formation (Late Cretaceous, Campanian)*; Sânpetru Formation (Late Cretaceous, Maastrichtian)	Austria (Lower Austria*); France (Provence-Alpes-Côte d'Azur); Romania (Hunedoara)	Analysis of its braincase suggests poor hearing and a sluggish, solitary lifestyle	
Styracosaurus	Lawrence M. Lambe	1913	Dinosaur Park Formation (Late Cretaceous, Campanian)	Canada (Alberta)	Possessed several long horns jutting out from the top of its frill, the patterns of which could have varied between individuals	
Suchomimus	Paul C. Sereno; Allison L. Beck; Didier B. Dutheil; Boubacar Gado; Hans C. E. Larsson; Gabrielle H. Lyon; Jonathan D. Marcot; Oliver W. M. Rauhut; Rudyard W. Sadleir; Christian A. Sidor; David D. Varricchio; Gregory P. Wilson; Jeffrey A. Wilson	1998	Elrhaz Formation (Early Cretaceous, Barremian to Albian)	Niger (Agadez)	Similar to Baryonyx but with a low sail on its back	
Suchosaurus	Richard Owen	1841	Wadhurst Clay Formation (Early Cretaceous, Valanginian)	England (East Sussex)	Two species have been named, both from teeth	
Sulcavis	Jingmai K. O'Connor; Yuguang Zhang; Luis M. Chiappe; Qingjin Meng; Li Quanguo; Liu Di	2013	Yixian Formation (Early Cretaceous, Barremian)	China (Liaoning)	A close relative of Shenqiornis with grooved enamel on its teeth, unique among fossil birds	
Supersaurus	James A. Jensen	1985	Morrison Formation (Late Jurassic, Kimmeridgian)	United States (Colorado*; Wyoming)	Several remains were originally believed to represent their own genera	
Suskityrannus	Sterling J. Nesbitt; Robert K. Denton Jr.; Mark A. Loewen; Stephen L. Brusatte; Nathan D. Smith; Alan H. Turner; James I. Kirkland; Andrew T. McDonald; Douglas G. Wolfe	2019	Moreno Hill Formation (Late Cretaceous, Turonian to Coniacian)	United States (New Mexico)	Small yet already possessed several features of larger, more derived tyrannosaurids, including an arctometatarsus	
Suuwassea	Jerald D. Harris; Peter Dodson	2004	Morrison Formation (Late Jurassic, Kimmeridgian to Tithonian)	United States (Montana)	Shares features with both diplodocids and dicraeosaurids, but is most likely a member of the latter group	
Suzhousaurus	Daqing Li; Cuo Peng; Hailu You; Matthew C. Lamanna; Jerald D. Harris; Kenneth J. Lacovara; Jianping Zhang	2007	Xiagou Formation (Early Cretaceous, Aptian)*; Zhonggou Formation (Early Cretaceous, Aptian)	China (Gansu)	One of the largest Early Cretaceous therizinosaurs	
Syngonosaurus	Harry G. Seeley	1879	Cambridge Greensand (Early Cretaceous, Albian)	England (Cambridgeshire)	Usually considered a synonym of Acanthopholis but it has been reinterpreted as an iguanodont	
Szechuanosaurus	Zhongjian Yang	1942	Kuangyuan Series (Late Jurassic, Oxfordian to Tithonian)	China (Sichuan)	Only known from teeth and possibly a very fragmentary skeleton	

== See also ==
- List of Mesozoic bird-line archosaur genera (A–B)
- List of Mesozoic bird-line archosaur genera (C–F)
- List of Mesozoic bird-line archosaur genera (G–K)
- List of Mesozoic bird-line archosaur genera (L–O)
- List of Mesozoic bird-line archosaur genera (T–Z)
