= Huangjian =

Huangjian may refer to:

- Huangjian, Jiangsu (黄尖), a town in Yancheng, Jiangsu, China.
- Huang Jian, a watercourse in Gansu, China

== Historical eras ==
- Huangjian (皇建, 560–561), era name used by Emperor Xiaozhao of Northern Qi
- Huangjian (皇建, 1210–1211), era name used by Emperor Xiangzong of Western Xia
