= La Cruz Formation =

La Cruz Formation may refer to:

- La Cruz Formation, Argentina, an Aptian geologic formation in Argentina
- La Cruz Formation, Costa Rica, a Miocene geologic formation in Costa Rica, overlying the Curré Formation
- La Cruz Formation, Cuba, a fossiliferous stratigraphic units in the Caribbean
