= Zhidan Group =

- Stratigraphic range: Early Cretaceous
- Type: Geological formation
- Sub-units: Luohandong Formation, Yijun Formation, Luohe Formation, Jingchuan Formation, Lamawan Formation, Hanhe-Huachi Formation
- Underlies: Tegaimiao Formation, Dongsheng Formation
- Overlies: Yuun Formation

Location
- Region: Inner Mongolia
- Country: China

The Zhidan Group is a geological formation in China whose strata date back to the Early Cretaceous. Dinosaur remains are among the fossils that have been recovered from the formation.

== Vertebrate paleofauna ==
- Psittacosaurus sp.
- Sauroplites scutiger
- Wuerhosaurus ordosensis
- Huanhepterus quingyanensis
- Ikechosaurus sunailinae

== See also ==
- List of dinosaur-bearing rock formations
