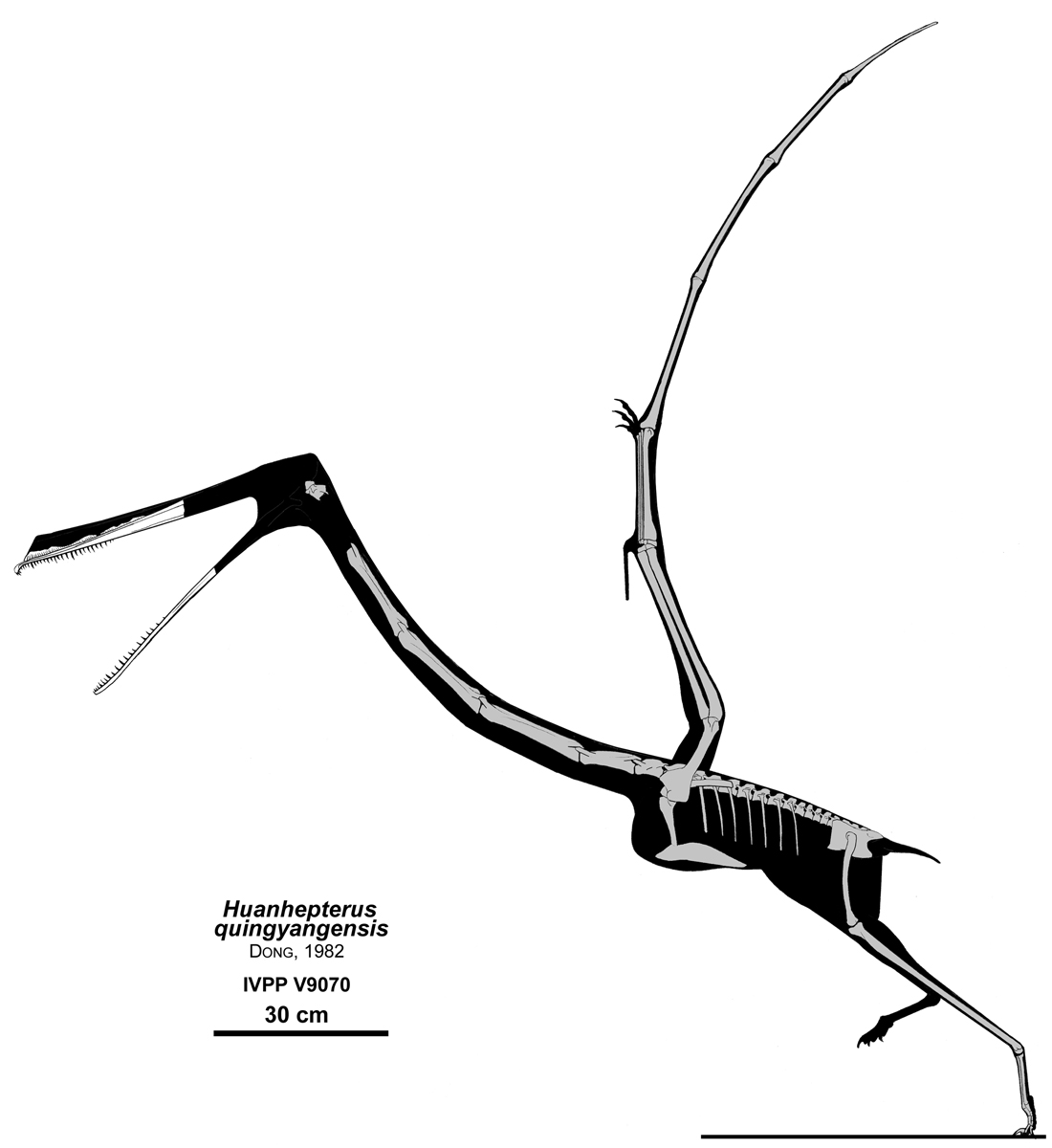
- Skeletal restoration showing preserved elements in white and impressions in grey

Scientific classification
- Kingdom: Animalia
- Phylum: Chordata
- Class: Reptilia
- Order: †Pterosauria
- Suborder: †Pterodactyloidea
- Family: †Ctenochasmatidae
- Subfamily: †Gnathosaurinae
- Genus: †Huanhepterus; Dong, 1982

Type species
- †Huanhepterus quingyangensis Dong, 1982

= Huanhepterus =

Huanhepterus Temporal range: Early Cretaceous, Hauterivian

Genus of ctenochasmatid pterosaur from the Early Cretaceous

Huanhepterus is an extinct genus of ctenochasmatid pterodactyloid pterosaur from the Early Cretaceous period of what is now Qingyang, Gansu, China.

== History ==
The genus was named by Dong Zhiming in 1982. The type species is Huanhepterus quingyangensis. The genus name refers to the Huang Jian (not the Yellow River or "Huang He", but a smaller tributary of the Jinghe River in Gansu), and combines it with a Latinized Greek pteron, "wing". The specific name refers to Qinyang County.

Huanhepterus is based on the holotype specimen, IVPP V9070, a partial articulated skeleton consisting mostly of impressions of the left half of the body and the beak-end of the skull. The fossil was in May 1978 found in a quarry operated by the Sanshilipu-commune, when an explosion exposed a vertebra. Its force obliterated the right half of the specimen. IVPP V9070 hails from the Early Cretaceous-age Hanhe-Huachi Formation of the Zhidan Group.

== Description ==
Huanhepterus had a long, low skull, with a low crest running along the midline that was higher toward the tip of the snout and became smaller toward the eyes. The teeth, about 26 pairs in the upper and 25 in the lower jaws, were slender and numerous, and became shorter farther from the 11th pair, both to the front as to the back, where they become absent completely in posterior part of the snout. The cervical vertebrae were long, as were the toes, and there was no fused complex of the front dorsal vertebrae (notarium), as seen in other pterosaurs. The wingspan of the type individual was estimated at 2.5 m (8.2 ft). This genus was described as most like Gnathosaurus. David Unwin later referred it the Gnathosaurinae, a subgroup of the Ctenochasmatidae.

== Classification ==
Below is cladogram following a topology by Andres, Clark and Xu (2014). In the analysis, they recovered Huanhepterus within the family Ctenochasmatidae, more precisely within the subfamily Gnathosaurinae, though placed in the basalmost position.

- Ctenochasmatidae
  - Ctenochasmatinae
    - Ctenochasma
    - Pterodaustrini
      - Pterodaustro guinazui
      - - Eosipterus yangi
        - - Beipiaopterus chenianus
          - Gegepterus changi
  - - Kepodactylus insperatus
    - - Elanodactylus prolatus
      - - Moganopterinae
          - Feilongus youngi
          - Moganopterus zhuiana
        - Gnathosaurinae
          - Huanhepterus quingyangensis
          - - Plataleorhynchus streptophorodon
            - - Gnathosaurus subulatus
              - Gnathosaurus macrurus

== Biology ==
Like Gnathosaurus, it may have used its tightly-packed, slender teeth to filter food from water.

== See also ==
- List of pterosaur genera
- Timeline of pterosaur research
