= La Cruz Formation, Argentina =

Geologic formation in Argentina

La Cruz Formation
- Stratigraphic range: Aptian
- Type: Geological formation
- Unit of: El Gigante Group
- Underlies: Lagarcito Formation
- Overlies: El Toscal Formation

Lithology
- Primary: Sandstone
- Other: Conglomerate

Location
- Coordinates: 32.5°S 67.0°W
- Approximate paleocoordinates: 33.3°S 34.0°W
- Region: San Luis Province
- Country: Argentina
- Extent: Marayes-El Carrizal Basin
- La Cruz Formation, Argentina (Argentina)

The La Cruz Formation is an Aptian geologic formation in Argentina. Pterosaur fossils of Pterodaustro guinazui and Puntanipterus globosus and fish fossils of Austrolepidotes cuyanus, Pleuropholidae indet and Neosemionotus puntanus have been recovered from the formation. The formation, the uppermost unit of the El Gigante Group, overlies the El Toscal Formation, and is overlain by the Lagarcito Formation. The unit comprises sandstones and conglomerates, deposited in an alluvial plain to fluvial environment.

== See also ==
- List of pterosaur-bearing stratigraphic units
