= Huachihuanhe Formation =

Geological formation in China

Hanhe-Huachi Formation
- Stratigraphic range: Hauterivian
- Type: Geological formation
- Unit of: Zhidan Group
- Underlies: Luohan Formation
- Overlies: Luohe Formation
- Thickness: 400-500 metres

Lithology
- Primary: Mudstone, sandstone

Location
- Region: Gansu Province
- Country: China

The Hanhe-Huachi formation, also called Huachi-Hanhe formation is a geologic formation in China. It is Early Cretaceous, probably Hauterivian, in age. The Pterosaur Huanhepterus has been recovered from the formation.

== Fossil content ==
Color key: Taxon / Reclassified taxon / Taxon falsely reported as present / Dubious taxon or junior synonym / Ichnotaxon / Ootaxon / Morphotaxon	Notes; Uncertain or tentative taxa are in small text; ~~crossed out~~ taxa are discredited.

=== Pterosaurs ===
Pterosaurs of the Huachihuanhe Formation
Genus	Species	Location	Stratigraphic position	Material	Notes	Images
Huanhepterus	H. quingyangensis	Quiyang, Gansu Province, China	Hauterivian		A gnathosaurine ctenochasmatid	

== See also ==
- List of pterosaur-bearing stratigraphic units
