= Puntanipterus =

Puntanipterus Temporal range: Aptian

Scientific classification
- Domain: Eukaryota
- Kingdom: Animalia
- Phylum: Chordata
- Order: †Pterosauria
- Suborder: †Pterodactyloidea
- Family: †Dsungaripteridae
- Genus: †Puntanipterus; Bonaparte and Sánchez, 1975
- Species: †P. globosus

Binomial name
- †Puntanipterus globosus Bonaparte and Sánchez, 1975

Genus of Pterosaur

Puntanipterus is a genus of pterodactyloid pterosaur from the Early Cretaceous period (Aptian stage) La Cruz Formation of San Luis, Argentina.

== Discovery and naming ==
The genus was in 1975 named by José Bonaparte and Teresa Sánchez. The type species is Puntanipterus globosus. The genus name refers to the Puntanos, the colloquial name for the inhabitants of the province of San Luis after the old name of their capital "San Luis de la Punta de los Venados", and combines this with a Latinized Greek pteron, "wing". The specific name means "spherical" in Latin, a reference to the form of the lower tibia.

It is based on holotype PVL 3869 (earlier FML 3869) found in 1972, a 105 millimetres long tibiotarsus and seven centimetres long fibula; referred to it were a back vertebra and a wing and foot phalanx. The leg bones were described as similar to those of Pterodaustro (from slightly younger rocks), except for having an expanded spherical joint at the ankle and spiny processes on the side faces of the tibia at that end.

== Classification ==
Bonaparte in 1978 classified Puntanipterus as a member of the Pterodaustridae. The same year Peter Wellnhofer was more careful and limited his assessment to a Pterodactyloidea incertae sedis. In 1980 Peter Galton concluded it belonged to the Dsungaripteridae. It was still by many considered to be a dsungaripterid by the time Peter Wellnhofer published The Illustrated Encyclopedia of Pterosaurs (several editions in the 1990s).

However, in the nineties several tibiae conforming to that of Puntanipterus were found in the same strata as Pterodaustro; a direct comparison is only impossible because more complete specimens of the latter are always very compressed, deforming the ankle morphology; but smaller fragments containing not-compressed ankles all have the build of a Puntanipterus tibiotarsus. This is by South American workers seen as a strong indication that both forms are identical.

Glut reported a personal communication from Laura Codorniú and Luis Chiappe (2004) that Puntanipterus should be regarded as a junior synonym of Pterodaustro, In his book, The Pterosaurs: From Deep Time, Unwin (2006) classified it as a possibly valid species of uncertain relationships. Codorniu and Gasparini (2007) formally synonymized Puntanipterus with Pterodaustro in their overview of pterosaurs from Patagonia. In a 2009 study, Puntanipterus was classified as a valid dsungaripterid genus and was considered to have a similar morphology to Noripterus based on comparison of known specimens.

== See also ==
- List of pterosaur genera
- Timeline of pterosaur research
