= Lagarcito Formation =

Geological formation in Argentina

- Stratigraphic range: Albian
- Type: Geological formation
- Underlies: San Roque Formation
- Overlies: La Cruz Formation

Lithology
- Primary: Sandstone
- Other: Mudstone

Location
- Coordinates: 32.5°S 67.0°W
- Approximate paleocoordinates: 38.0°S 38.7°W
- Region: San Luis Province
- Country: Argentina
- Extent: Marayes-El Carrizal Basin
- Lagarcito Formation (Argentina)

The Lagarcito Formation is an Albian geologic formation in Argentina. Pterosaur fossils have been recovered from the formation. The formation overlies the La Cruz Formation and is overlain by the San Roque Formation. The sandstones and mudstones of the formation were deposited in a fluvial and mostly lacustrine environment. The fossil association and the geological evidence indicate that the Lagarcito Formation represents a perennial shallow lake situated in an alluvial plain where detrital sedimentation and semiarid climatic conditions predominated.

== Fossil content ==
The following fossils have been found in the Lagarcito Formation:

- Austrolepidotus cuyanus
- Lepidotes pusillus
- Neosemionotus puntanus
- Pterodaustro guinazui
- Treptichnus pollardi
- Zurupleuropholis quijadensis
- Cyzicus aff. codoensis
- Darwinula sp.
- Copytus sp.
- Bisulcocypris sp.
- Candonopsis sp.
- Anura indet.
- Magnoliophyta indet.
- Trichoptera indet.

== See also ==
- List of pterosaur-bearing stratigraphic units
