= Shanyangosaurus =

Shanyangosaurus Temporal range: Late Cretaceous, Maastrichtian

Scientific classification
- Domain: Eukaryota
- Kingdom: Animalia
- Phylum: Chordata
- Clade: Dinosauria
- Clade: Saurischia
- Clade: Theropoda
- Clade: Coelurosauria
- Genus: †Shanyangosaurus; Xue et al., 1996
- Species: †S. niupanggouensis

Binomial name
- †Shanyangosaurus niupanggouensis Xue et al., 1996

Extinct genus of dinosaurs

Shanyangosaurus (meaning "Shanyang lizard") is a genus of theropod dinosaur found in Shaanxi, China, and known only from a partial sacrum, partial scapula, humeri, femur, tibia, metatarsals, and phalanges found in the Maastrichtian aged Shanyang Formation. The bones are reportedly hollow; this, along with other features of the femur and known foot bones, suggest it is a member of the coelurosauria, but a specific family cannot be determined without more material. Holtz et al. assigned Shanyangosaurus to Avetheropoda.
