= Luohe Formation =

Geologic Formation in China

- Stratigraphic range: Early Cretaceous
- Type: Geological formation
- Underlies: Huachihuanhe Formation

Lithology
- Primary: Sandstone
- Other: Mudstone, Siltstone, Conglomerate

Location
- Region: Shaanxi Province, Asia
- Country: China

The Luohe Formation is an Early Cretaceous geologic formation in China. It is located in the Ordos Basin, and records fossil dinosaur trackways.

== Geology ==
The formation mainly consists of three lithologic members: the lower member is a dark purple-red and purple-gray massive mudstone with dark purple micro-thin bedded argillaceous siltstone, and grey-yellow thick-bedded conglomeratic sandstone with horizontal bedding and low-angle oblique bedding developed. The middle member consists of purple-red thin-bedded quartz-fine sandstone and fine-medium grained feldspathic quartz sandstone, generally with large tabular oblique bedding, cross-bedding and parallel bedding. The upper member consists of purple-red and grey-yellow massive mudstone, silty mudstone and thin-bedded argillaceous siltstone, with parallel bedding and low-angle oblique bedding developed.

== Depositional environment ==
The Luohe Formation represents an aeolian dune field with interspersed interdune deposits. Sandstone wedges were identified at three different outcrops, representing infilling of thermal contraction cracks. This periglacial scenario is analogous to that of the Qiongkuai Lebashi Lake area, Xinjiang Uygur Autonomous Region. This Cretaceous plateau desert was estimated to be around 3-4 km paleoaltitude at a subtropical latitude.

== Fossils ==
Likely deinonychosaurian and other small indeterminate theropod trackways have been identified in the Luohe Formation.
