= Huang Jian =

Watercourse in Gansu, China

The Huang Brook or Huang Jian (Chinese: 皇澗, lit. "August Stream") is a watercourse in Gansu, China, running into the Jianghe River.

It is mentioned in the Book of Songs as being crossed by Duke Liu on his way to a new homeland for the Ji clan. It is also the namesake of the huanhepterus pterosaur.
