= Xinpongnaobao Formation =

Geological formation in Inner Mongolia, China

- Stratigraphic range: Early Cretaceous
- Type: Geological formation

Location
- Coordinates: 41.5°N 107°E
- Region: Asia
- Country: China

The Xinpongnaobao Formation is a geological formation in Inner Mongolia, China whose strata date back to the Early Cretaceous. Dinosaur remains are among the fossils that have been recovered from the formation.

== Vertebrate paleofauna ==
- Psittacosaurus osborni

== See also ==
- List of dinosaur-bearing rock formations
