= Shanyang Formation =

Geologic formation in China

- Stratigraphic range: Late Cretaceous, Maastrichtian
- Type: Geological formation

Location
- Region: Asia

The Shanyang Formation (simplified Chinese: 山阳组; traditional Chinese: 山陽組; pinyin: Shānyáng Zǔ) is a geological formation in Shaanxi whose strata date back to the Late Cretaceous. Dinosaur remains are among the fossils that have been recovered from the formation.

== Vertebrate paleofauna ==
- Shanyangosaurus niupanggouensis - "Partial sacrum, partial scapula, humeri, femur, tibia, metatarsals, [and] phalanges."
- Qinlingosaurus luonanensis
- Shantungosaurus cf giganteus

== See also ==
- List of dinosaur-bearing rock formations
