= Austrolepidotes =

Austrolepidotes Temporal range: Albian

Scientific classification
- Domain: Eukaryota
- Kingdom: Animalia
- Phylum: Chordata
- Class: Actinopterygii
- Clade: Ginglymodi
- Order: †Semionotiformes
- Family: †Semionotidae
- Genus: †Austrolepidotes; Bocchino, 1974
- Species: †A. cuyanus

Binomial name
- †Austrolepidotes cuyanus Bocchino, 1974

Synonyms
- Austrolepidotus

Extinct genus of fishes

Austrolepidotes is an extinct genus of prehistoric freshwater ray-finned fish from the Early Cretaceous. It contains a single species, A. cuyanus from the Lagarcito Formation of Argentina.

The holotype specimen has been lost, and its taxonomic status is considered doubtful. It is thus considered a nomen dubium.

== See also ==
- Prehistoric fish
- List of prehistoric bony fish
