= Qinlingosaurus =

Qinlingosaurus Temporal range: Late Cretaceous, Maastrichtian

Scientific classification
- Domain: Eukaryota
- Kingdom: Animalia
- Phylum: Chordata
- Clade: Dinosauria
- Clade: Saurischia
- Clade: †Sauropodomorpha
- Clade: †Sauropoda
- Family: †incertae sedis
- Genus: †Qinlingosaurus; Xue et al., 1996
- Species: †Q. luonanensis

Binomial name
- †Qinlingosaurus luonanensis Xue et al., 1996

Extinct genus of dinosaurs

Qinlingosaurus is a genus of herbivorous sauropod dinosaur from the Late Cretaceous of Asia.

The type species, Qinlingosaurus luonanensis (Chinese: 洛南秦岭龙; pinyin: Luònán Qínlǐnglóng), was named by Xue Xiangxu, Zhang Yunxiang and Bi Xianwu in 1996. The generic name comes from the Qinling mountain range of Shaanxi Province in China, where the first fossils were recovered at Hongtuling. The specific name refers to the provenance near Luonan.

The holotype, NWUV 1112, was found in a layer of the Hongtuling Formation or Shanyang Formation, perhaps dating from the Maastrichtian. It consists of an ilium, ischium and three vertebrae. The ilium has a length of seventy-seven centimetres and is elongated with a convex upper profile. Its anterior process is relatively long. The pubic process is long, the ischial process short.

Xue and colleagues, in their original description of Qinlingosaurus, were uncertain whether to classify it as a titanosaur or in some other family of sauropods. They noted that the ilium had similarities to that of Opisthocoelicaudia. In 2015, Xing and colleagues tentatively classified it as a neosauropod. In 2023, Mo and colleagues listed it as a titanosauriform.

Qinlingosaurus luonanensis was considered a nomen dubium by Upchurch and colleagues in 2004.
