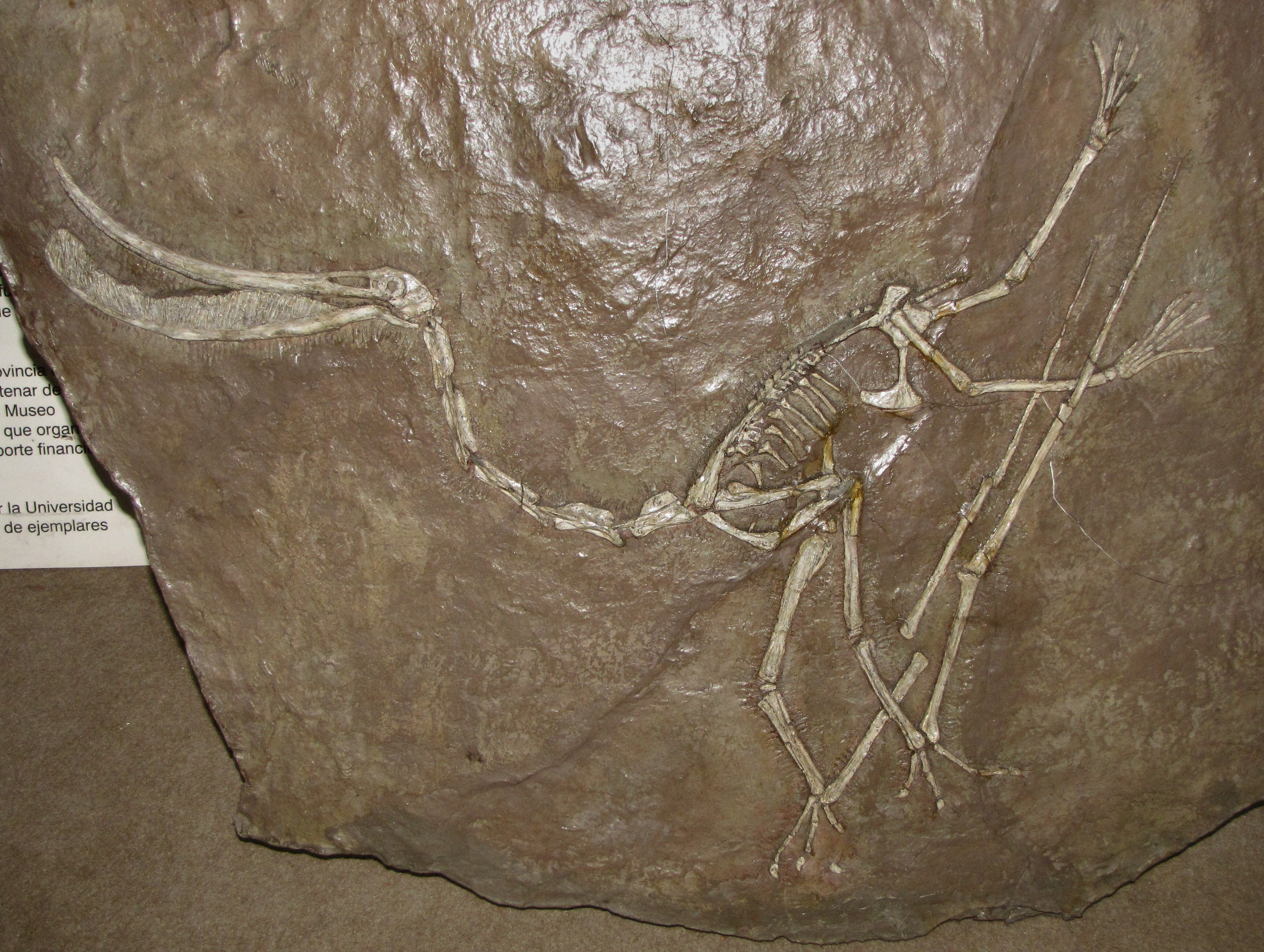
- Cast of a fossil specimen at the Museo Argentino de Ciencias Naturales in Caballito, Buenos Aires, Argentina

Scientific classification
- Kingdom: Animalia
- Phylum: Chordata
- Class: Reptilia
- Order: †Pterosauria
- Suborder: †Pterodactyloidea
- Family: †Ctenochasmatidae
- Genus: †Pterodaustro; Bonaparte, 1970
- Species: †P. guinazui

Binomial name
- †Pterodaustro guinazui Bonaparte, 1970

Synonyms
- Puntanipterus? Bonaparte & Sánchez, 1975

= Pterodaustro =

Pterodaustro Temporal range: Early Cretaceous, 105 Ma

Genus of ctenochasmatid pterosaur from the Early Cretaceous

Pterodaustro (from Greek pteron, 'wing' and Latin auster, 'south') is a genus of ctenochasmatid pterodactyloid pterosaur from South America. Its fossil remains dated back to the Early Cretaceous period, about 105 million years ago.

== Discovery and naming ==
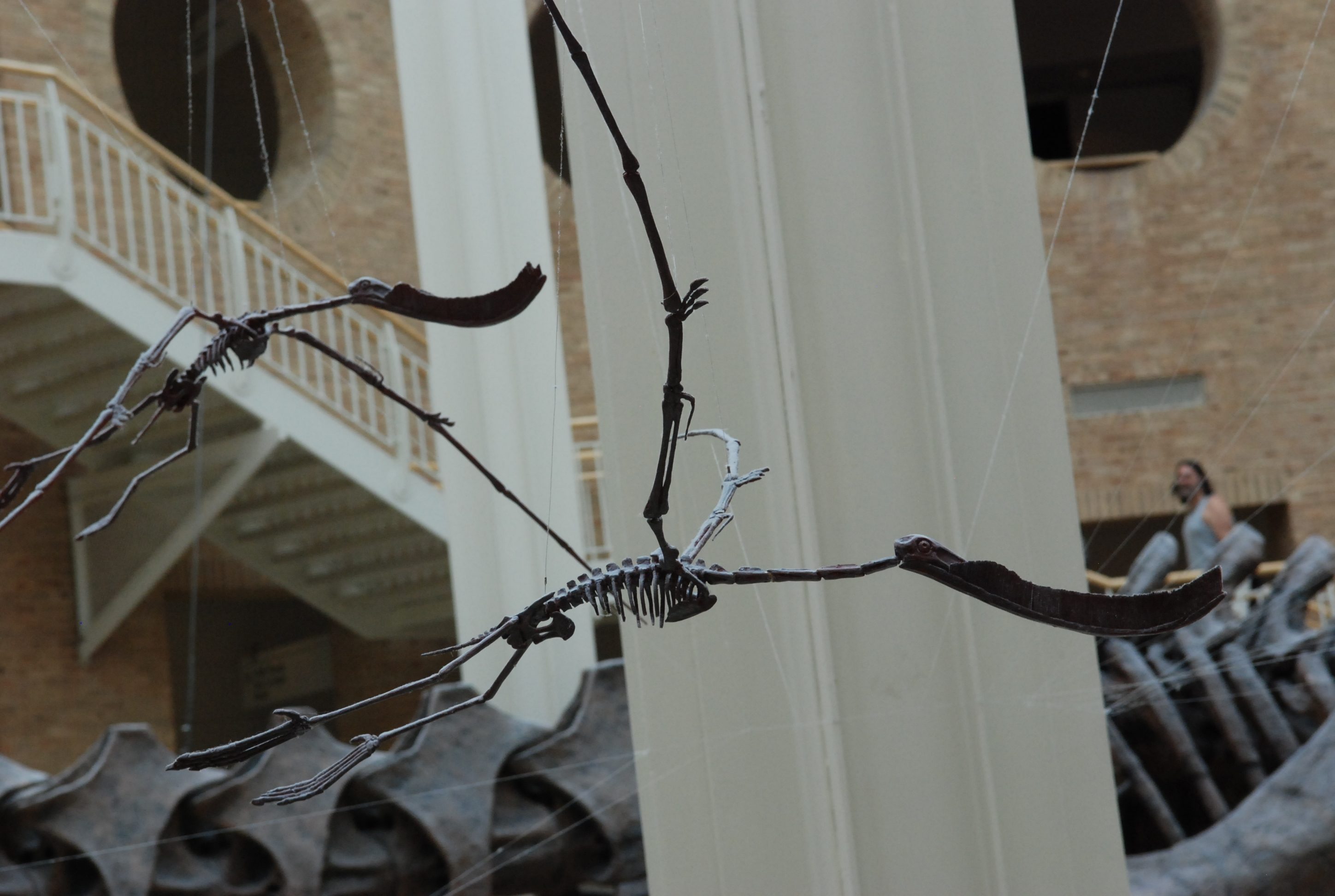
Skeletal mount of Pterodaustro at the Fernbank Museum of Natural History

The first fossils, among them the holotype PVL 2571, a thigh bone, were discovered during the late 1960s by José Bonaparte in the Lagarcito Formation, situated in the San Luis Province of Argentina, and dating from the Albian. The genus was subsequently reported in Chile from the Quebrada La Carreta locality, in the Sierra da Candeleros, Segunda Región de Antofagsta, but this turned out to be erroneous; the fossils belong another pterosaur, the dsungaripterid Domeykodactylus ceciliae. At the Argentine site, the just 50 square meters (540 sq ft) large "Loma del Pterodaustro", since then, during several expeditions, over 750 Pterodaustro specimens have been collected, 288 of them having been catalogued until 2008. This makes the species one of the best known pterosaurs, with examples from all growth stages, from egg to adult.

The genus was named in 1969 by José Bonaparte as an as yet undescribed nomen nudum. The first description followed in 1970, making the name valid, the type species being Pterodaustro guiñazui. The generic name is derived from Greek pteron, "wing" and Latin auster, "south (wind)". The elements are combined as a condensed pteron de austro, "wing from the south". The specific name honors paleontologist Román Guiñazú. It was amended in 1978 by Peter Wellnhofer into guinazui, because diacritical signs such as the tilde are not allowed in specific names.

== Description ==
Size compared to a human

Pterodaustro had a maximum adult wingspan of approximately 3 m (9 ft 10 in) and a maximum body mass of approximately 9.2 kg (20 lb). Its hindlimbs are rather robust and its feet large. Its tail is uniquely elongated for a pterodactyloid, containing twenty-two caudal vertebrae, whereas other members of this group have at most, sixteen.

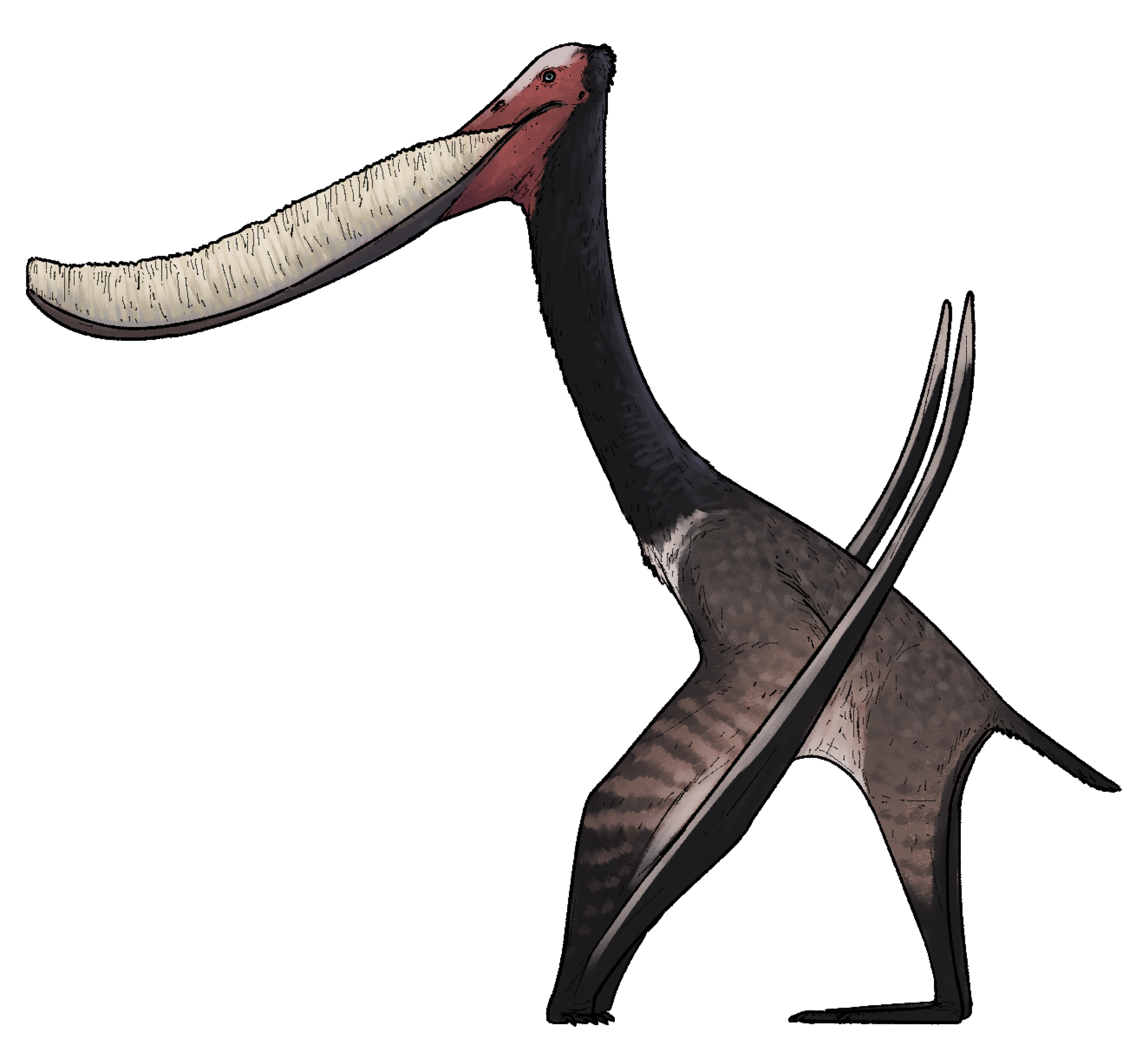
Life restoration

Pterodaustro has a very elongated skull, up to 29 cm (11 in) long. The portion in front of the eye sockets comprises 85 percent of skull length. The long snout and lower jaws curve strongly upwards; the tangent at the point of the snout is perpendicular to that of the jaw joint. Pterodaustro has about a thousand bristle-like modified teeth in its lower jaws that might have been used to strain crustaceans, plankton, algae, and other small creatures from the water. These teeth stand for the most part not in separate alveoli but in two long grooves parallel to the edges of the jaw. They have a length of 3 centimeters (1.2 in) and are oval in cross-section, with a width of just 0.2 to 0.3 millimeters (0.0079 to 0.0118 in).

At first it was suspected these structures were not true teeth at all, but later research established they were built like normal teeth, including enamel, dentine and a pulp. Despite being made of very hard material, they might still have been flexible to some extent due to their extreme length-width ratio, a bend of up to 45 degrees being possible. The upper jaws also carried teeth, but these were very small with a flat conical base and a spatula-formed crown. These teeth also do not have separate tooth sockets but were apparently held by ligaments in a special tooth pad, that was also covered with small ossicles, or bone plates. It appears that they were not replaced, unlike the teeth of most other reptiles.

The back of the skull was also rather elongated and in a low position; there are some indications for a low parietal crest.

== Paleobiology ==
=== Feeding ===
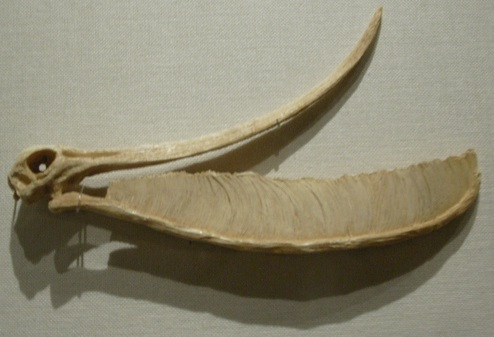
Restored skull

Pterodaustro probably strained food with its tooth comb, a method called "filter feeding", also practised by modern flamingos. Once it caught its food, Pterodaustro probably mashed it with the small, globular teeth present in its upper jaw.

Like other ctenochasmatoids, Pterodaustro has a long torso and proportionally massive and splayed hindfeet, adaptations for swimming. A recent study suggested that its ankle facilitated movements required for wading behavior.

Robert Bakker suggested that, like flamingos, this pterosaur's diet may have resulted in a pink hue.

At least two specimens of Pterodaustro have been found, MIC V263 and MIC V243, with gizzard stones in the stomach cavity, the first ever reported for any pterosaur. These clusters of small stones with angled edges support the idea that Pterodaustro ate mainly small, hard-shelled aquatic crustaceans using filter-feeding. Such invertebrates are abundant in the sediment of the fossil site.

=== Life history ===
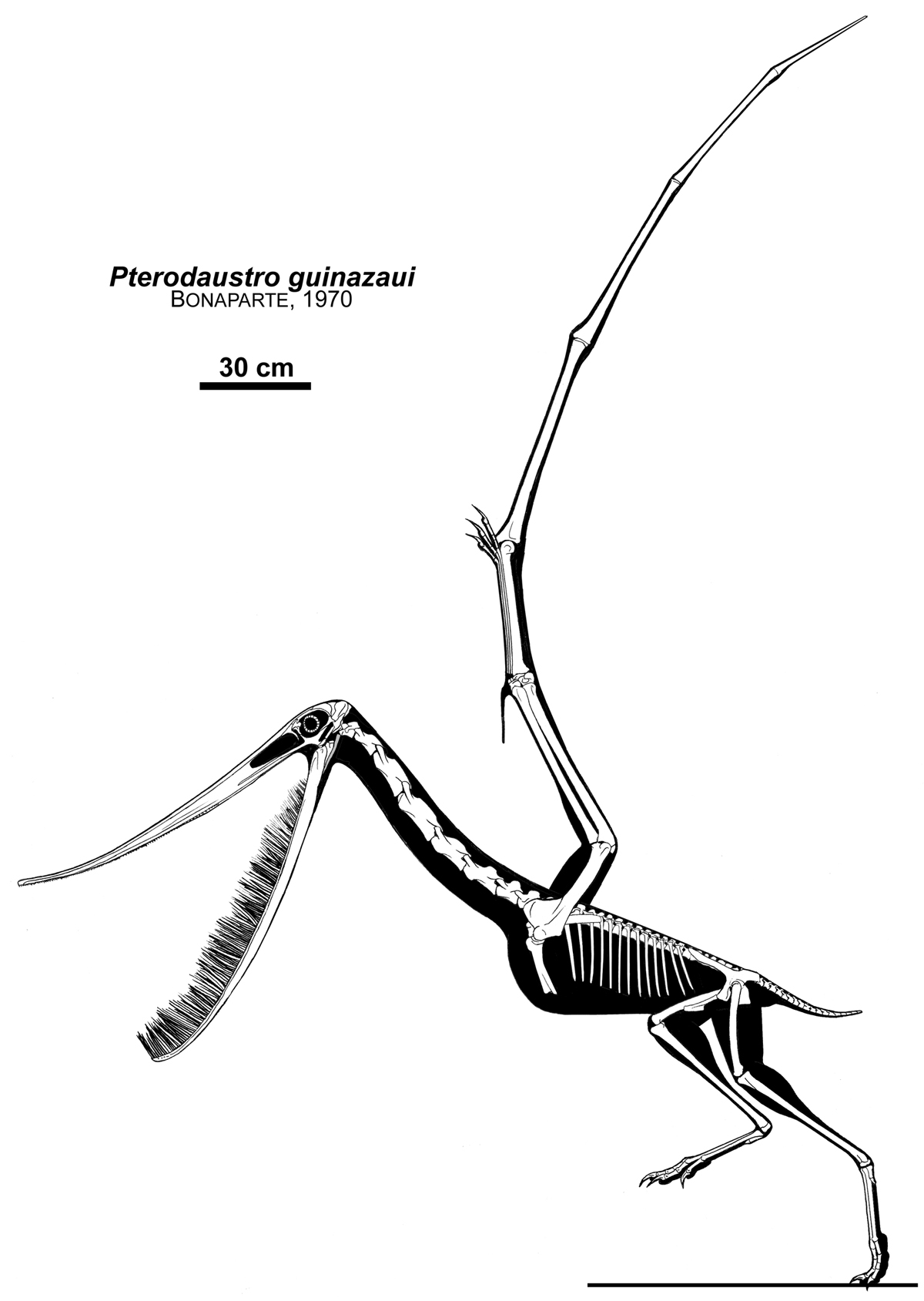
Skeletal restoration

A study of the growth stages of Pterodaustro concluded that juveniles grew relatively fast in their first two years, attaining about half of the adult size. Then they reached sexual maturity, growing at a slower rate for four to five years until there was a determinate growth stop.

Biomechanical modelling suggests that Pterodaustro juveniles were capable of powered flight, contradicting the ‘fly-late’ and ‘glide-early’ hypotheses about changes in their flight capabilities over ontogenetic development.

In 2004 a Pterodaustro embryo in an egg was reported, specimen MHIN-UNSL-GEO-V246. The egg was elongated, 6 centimeters (2.4 in) long and 22 millimeters (0.87 in) across, and its mainly flexible shell was covered with a thin layer of calcite, 0.3 millimeters thick. Three-dimensionally preserved eggs were reported in 2014.

In 2009, possible medullary bone tissue was reported from the largest known femur of Pterodaustro (V 382). Medullary bone tissues are previously only known from modern birds that are laying eggs in reproduction, and some non-avian dinosaurs such as Tyrannosaurus rex, so this record would make it the first reported occurrence of a non-dinosaurian medullary bone. In 2021, Padian and Woodward suggested that this tissue might instead represent a crushed endosteal tissue.

=== Comparison with waterfowls ===
Comparisons between the scleral rings of Pterodaustro and modern birds and reptiles suggest that it may have been nocturnal and similar in activity patterns to modern anseriform birds that feed at night, although the method of this research has been questioned by some researchers.

Because of its long torso and neck and comparatively short legs, Pterodaustro was unique among pterosaurs in having difficulties to launch. Even with the pterosaurian quadrupedal launching mechanism, it would have required frantic and fairly-low angled take-offs possible only in open areas, much like modern geese and swans.

== Phylogeny ==
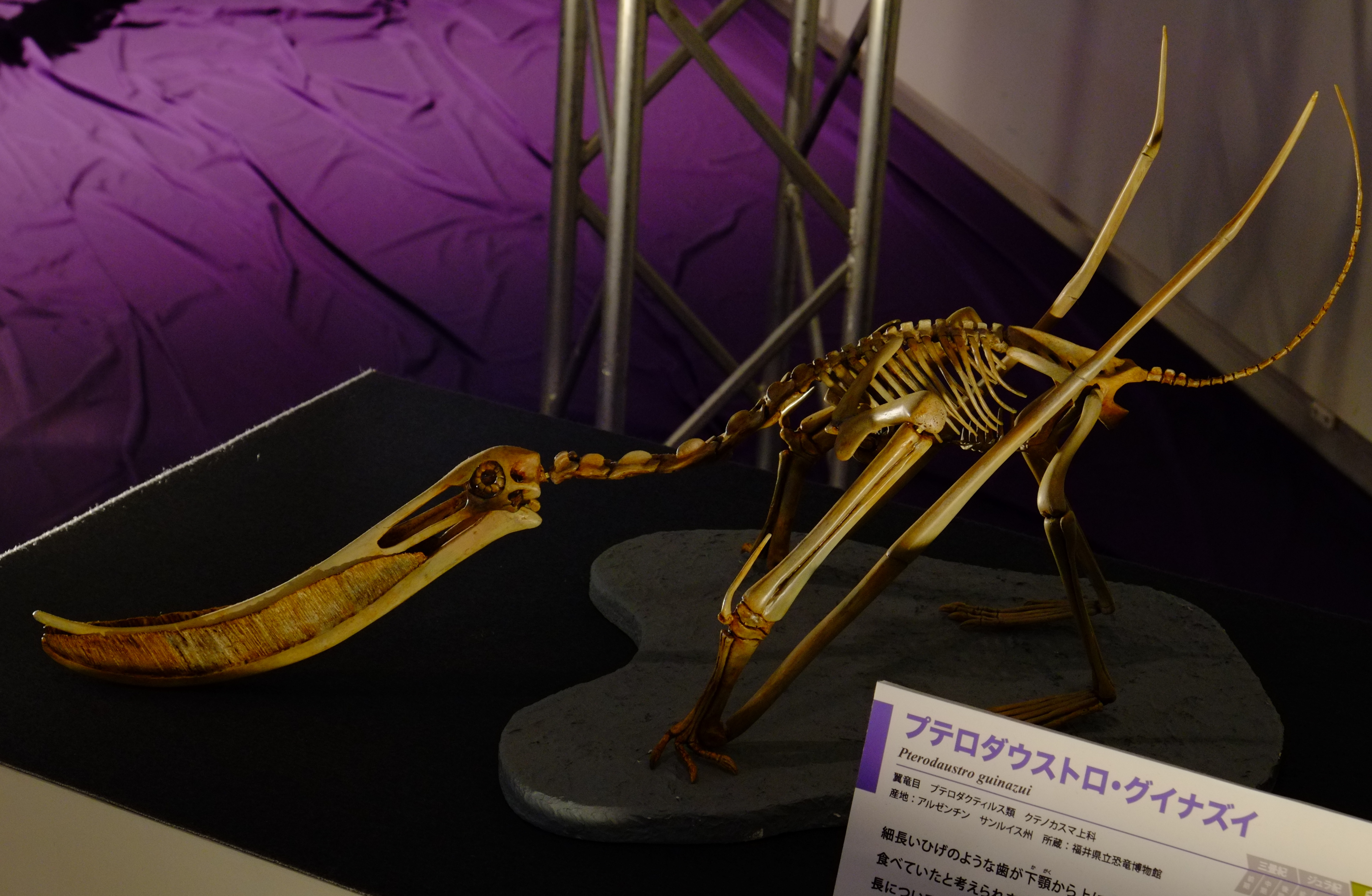
Skeletal mount of Pterodaustro at an exhibition in Japan

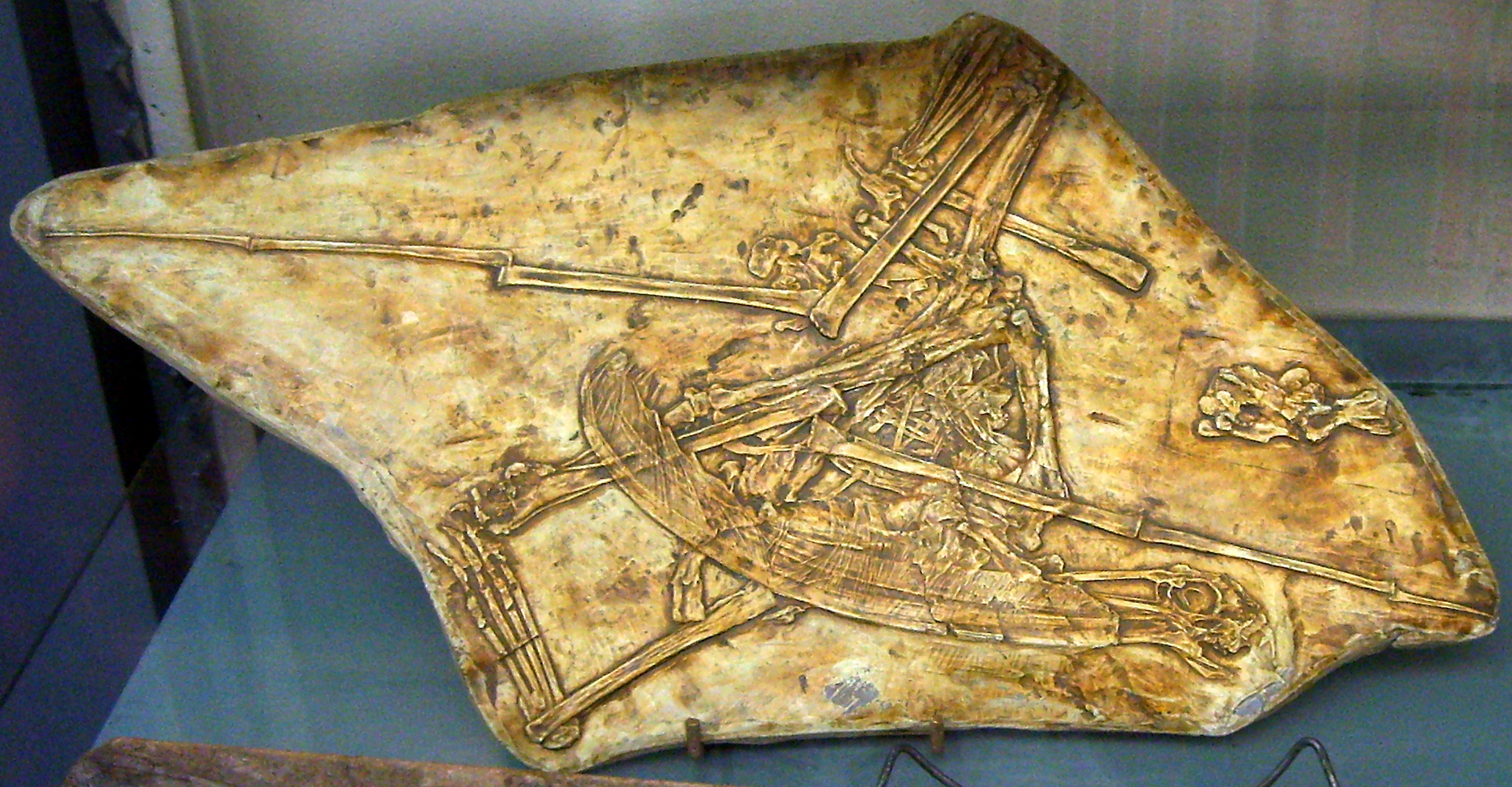
Fossil cast, Muséum national d'Histoire naturelle, Paris

Bonaparte in 1970 assigned Pterodaustro to the Pterodactylidae; in 1971 to a Pterodaustriidae. However, from 1996 cladistic studies by Alexander Kellner and David Unwin have shown a position within the family Ctenochasmatidae, together with other filter feeders.

In 2018, a topology by Longrich, Martill and Andres recovered Pterodaustro within the family Ctenochasmatidae, more precisely within the tribe called Pterodaustrini, in a more basal position than Beipiaopterus and Gegepterus.

- Ctenochasmatidae
  - Ctenochasmatinae
    - Ctenochasma
    - Pterodaustrini
      - Pterodaustro
      - - Beipiaopterus
        - Gegepterus
  - - Kepodactylus
    - - Moganopterinae
        - Moganopterus
        - Feilongus
      - - Ardeadactylus
        - - Elanodactylus
          - Gnathosaurinae
            - Huanhepterus
            - - Plataleorhynchus
              - Gnathosaurus

== See also ==
- List of pterosaur genera
- Timeline of pterosaur research
