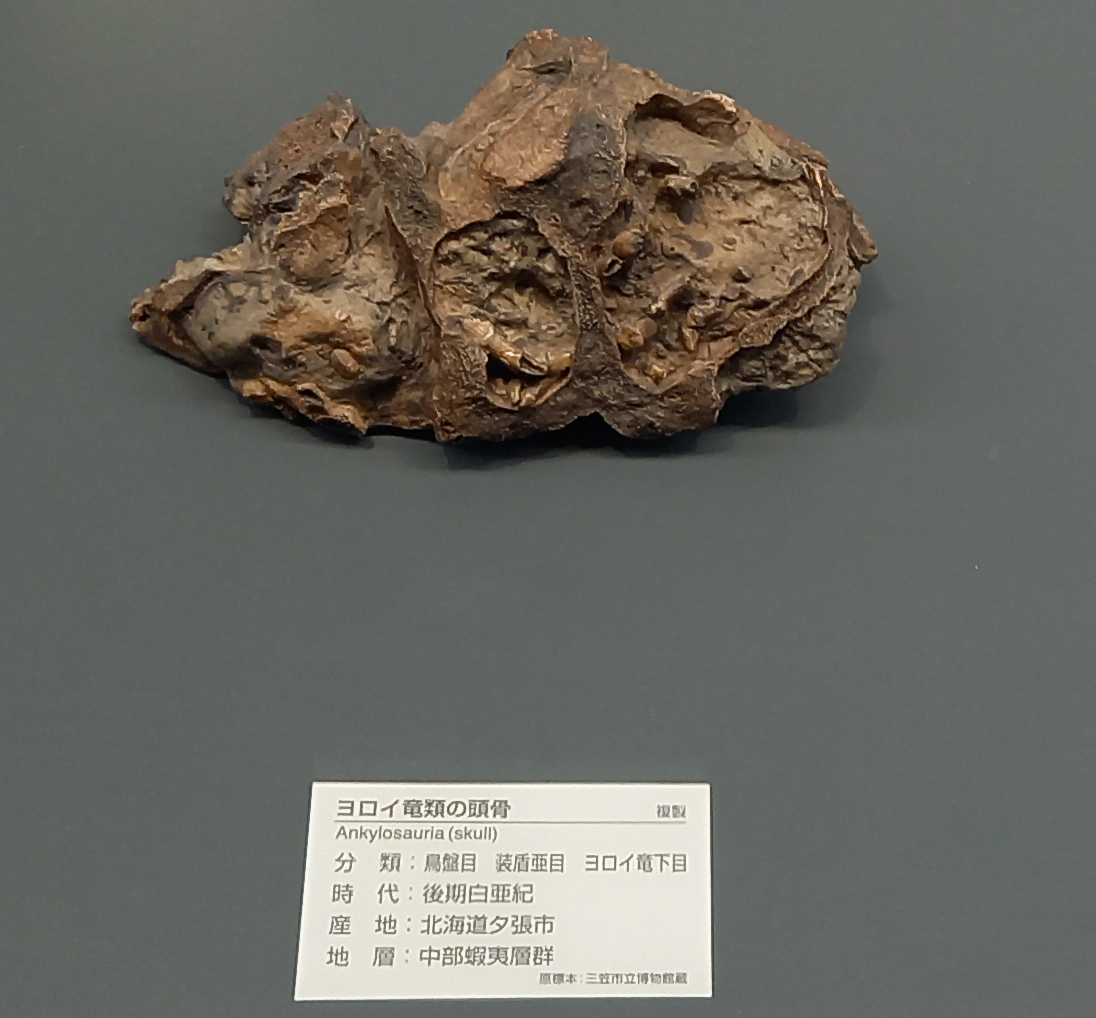
- Replica of holotype specimen displayed at the Fukui Prefectural Dinosaur Museum

Scientific classification
- Kingdom: Animalia
- Phylum: Chordata
- Class: Reptilia
- Clade: Dinosauria
- Clade: †Ornithischia
- Clade: †Thyreophora
- Clade: †Ankylosauria
- Family: †Nodosauridae
- Genus: †Nipponopelta; Oyabu et al., 2026
- Species: †N. yezoensis

Binomial name
- †Nipponopelta yezoensis Oyabu et al., 2026

= Nipponopelta =

Nipponopelta Temporal range: Late Cretaceous, late Cenomanian

Genus of anyklosaurian dinosaur

Nipponopelta (lit. 'Japanese shield') is an extinct genus of nodosaurid ankylosaurian dinosaur known from the Upper Cretaceous (Cenomanian age) Hikagenosawa Formation of the Yezo Group in Japan. The genus contains a single species, Nipponopelta yezoensis, known from a partial skull and fragmentary associated remains. It is the first ankylosaur to be named from Japan.

== Discovery and naming ==
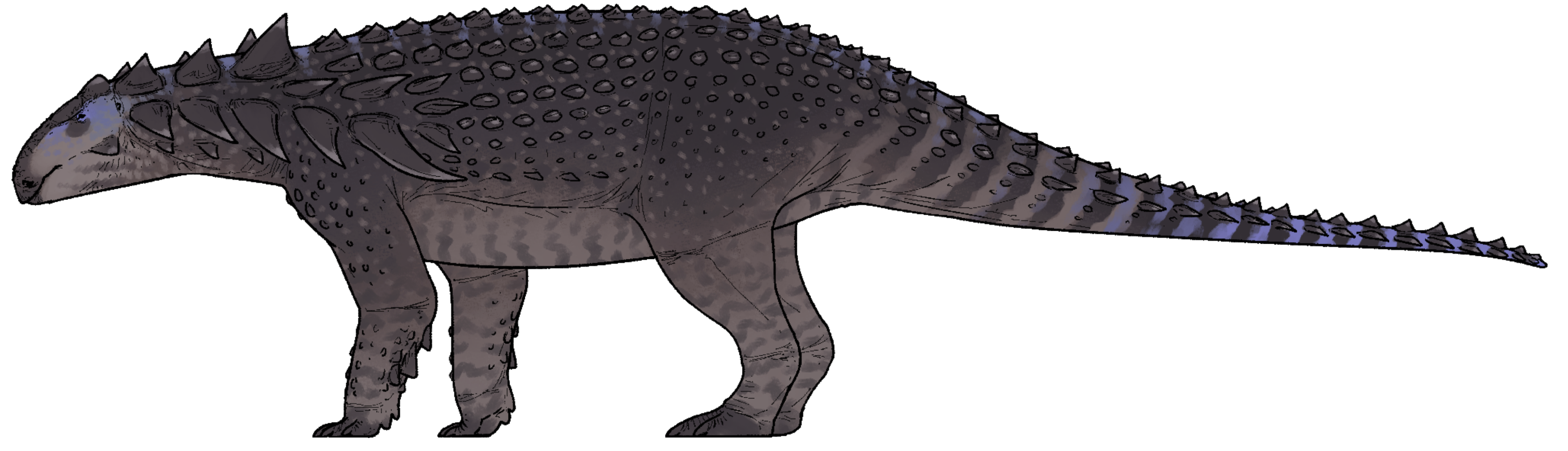
Life restoration

The Nipponopelta fossil material was discovered by Eijiro Goto on June 25, 1995, along the bank of the Omakizawa River in the city of Yūbari in Hokkaido, Japan. The partial skull of an ankylosaur was preserved within a calcareous concretion that had eroded from outcrops of the Hikagenosawa Formation. Goto donated the fossil to the Mikasa City Museum, where it was permanently accessioned as specimen MCM A522. It was prepared using formic acid to dissolve some of the surrounding rock. Preparation was halted after isolated, disarticulated teeth were found in the skull's cavities, to maintain the specimen's structural stability. In 1996, Hiroshi Hayakawa and Kenneth Carpenter preliminarily reported on the new specimen in a conference abstract for the Annual Meeting of the Palaeontological Society of Japan. In 2005, Hayakawa, Makoto Manabe, and Carpenter published a more detailed description of the specimen. They noted that much of the fossil remained encased in the matrix, obscuring many of the anatomical details. The material they could observe included the rear portion of the skull (the front part being missing), several disarticulated teeth, the atlas (first cervical vertebra), and two osteoderms (armor plates). Based on the skull fenestration pattern and the structure of the occipital condyle and teeth, they identified it as a member of the ankylosaur clade Nodosauridae.

In 2026, Shumpei Oyabu and colleagues described Nipponopelta yezoensis as a new genus and species of nodosaurid ankylosaur based on these fossil remains, designating MCM A522 as the holotype specimen. Using CT scans of the fossil, they were able to identify previously unrecognized anatomical features, including two complete teeth, the left semicircular canals, and a small part of the left mandible. The generic name, Nipponopelta, combines the Japanese word 日本 (Nippon), meaning 'Japan', with the Greek word πέλτη (péltē), meaning 'shield'. The specific name, yezoensis, alludes to Yezo, the traditional name for Hokkaido, where the only known specimen was discovered. The description of this species makes it the first ankylosaur to be named from Japan.

== Classification ==
To test the affinities and relationships of Nipponopelta, Oyabu et al. (2026) included it in an updated version of the phylogenetic matrix of Xing et al. (2024), which in turn was derived from Raven et al. (2023). Nipponopelta was recovered as a derived member of the Nodosauridae, more closely related to Nodosaurus and Panoplosaurus (Nodosaurinae) than to Polacanthus (Polacanthinae) or Struthiosaurus (Struthiosauridae). The taxa closest to Nipponopelta were recovered in a large, unresolved polytomy. After removing several unstable "wildcard taxa" for improved resolution, their 50% majority-rule consensus tree recovered Nipponopelta as the sister taxon to Pawpawsaurus, with Borealopelta and a Edmontonia longiceps + Denversaurus clade as successive sister branches. As such, Nipponopelta is much more closely related to North American nodosaurids than to Asian taxa, the closest of which, in their analyses, is the Chinese Taohelong. These results are displayed in the cladogram below, with clade names following Madzia et al. (2021):

- Ankylosauria
  - Ahshislepelta
  - Kunbarrasaurus
  - - Patagopelta
    - - Animantarx
      - - Cedarpelta
        - Paw Paw juvenile
  - Struthiosauridae
    ⊞
    - Europelta
    - - - Hungarosaurus
        - Struthiosaurus languedocensis
      - - Stegopelta
        - - Struthiosaurus austriacus
          - - Struthiosaurus transylvanicus
            - Tianchisaurus
    ⊟
  - - - Ankylosauridae
      - Nodosauridae
        - Polacanthinae
          ⊞
          - - Minmi
            - - Dongyangopelta
              - Antarctopelta
          - - Mymoorapelta
            - - Polacanthus
              - - - Sarcolestes
                  - Gargoyleosaurus
                - - Gastonia burgei
                  - Gastonia lorriemcwhinneyae
          ⊟
        - Nodosaurinae
          - Vectipelta
          - - Texasetes
            - - - Sauropelta
                - Tatankacephalus
              - - Niobrarasaurus
                - - - Anoplosaurus
                    - - Silvisaurus
                      - Taohelong
                  - - Nodosaurus
                    - Panoplosaurini
                      - - Dracopelta
                        - Edmontonia rugosidens
                      - - Panoplosaurus
                        - - - Denversaurus
                            - Edmontonia longiceps
                          - - Borealopelta
                            - - Nipponopelta
                              - Pawpawsaurus

== Paleoecology ==
Nipponopelta is known from the upper Hikagenosawa Formation, which dates to the late Cenomanian of the late Cretaceous period. This formation represents a marine depositional environment. In their description of this taxon, Oyabu and colleagues suggested that Nipponopelta and its close relatives favored near-marine settings like coastal and estuarine environments. However, they acknowledged that the frequent occurrence of nodosaurid remains in marine deposits could be partially explained by post-mortem transport of carcasses. Nevertheless, various points of evidence, including fossil trackways, indicate that many nodosaurids predominantly occupied lowland, fluvial, and coastal habitats, which may have played an important role in their dispersal between continents.
