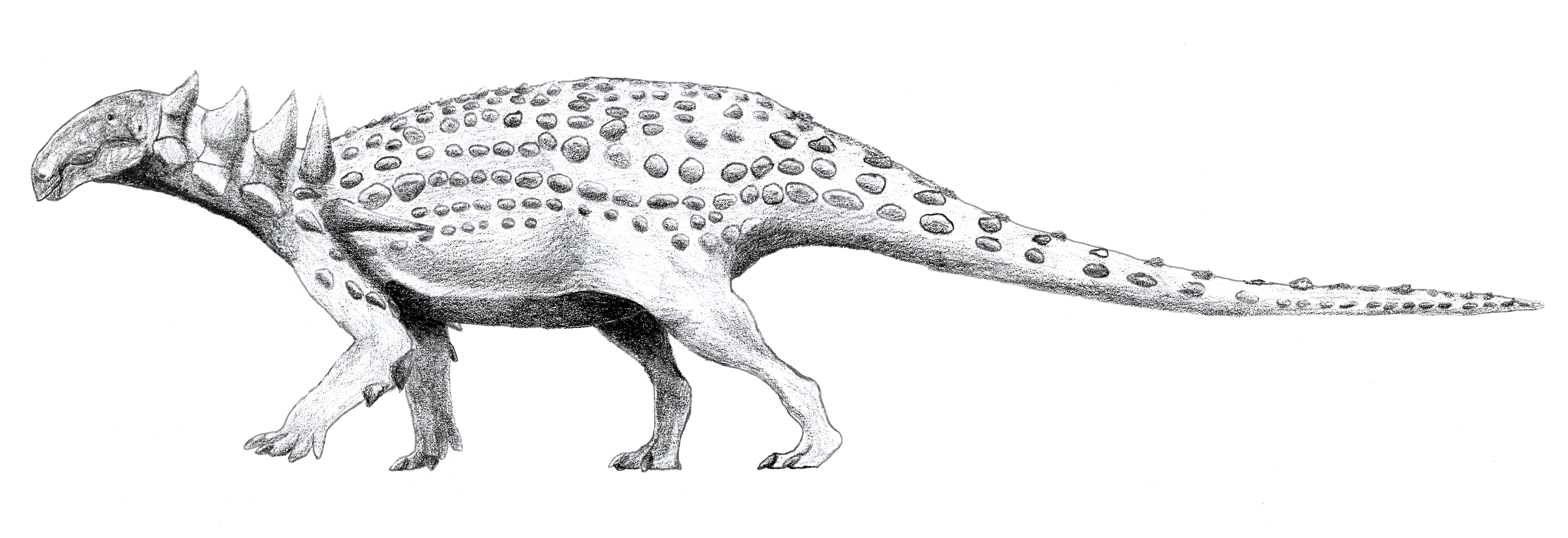
- Life restoration based on Sauropelta, a possible relative

Scientific classification
- Kingdom: Animalia
- Phylum: Chordata
- Class: Reptilia
- Clade: Dinosauria
- Clade: †Ornithischia
- Clade: †Thyreophora
- Clade: †Ankylosauria
- Family: †Nodosauridae
- Subfamily: †Nodosaurinae
- Genus: †Acantholipan; Rivera-Sylva et al., 2018

Type species
- †Acantholipan gonzalezi Rivera-Sylva et al. 2018

= Acantholipan =

Acantholipan Temporal range: Late Cretaceous, 83.6 Ma

Extinct genus of dinosaurs

Acantholipan is a genus of herbivorous nodosaurid dinosaur from Mexico from the early Santonian age of the Late Cretaceous. It includes one species, Acantholipan gonzalezi.

== Discovery and naming ==
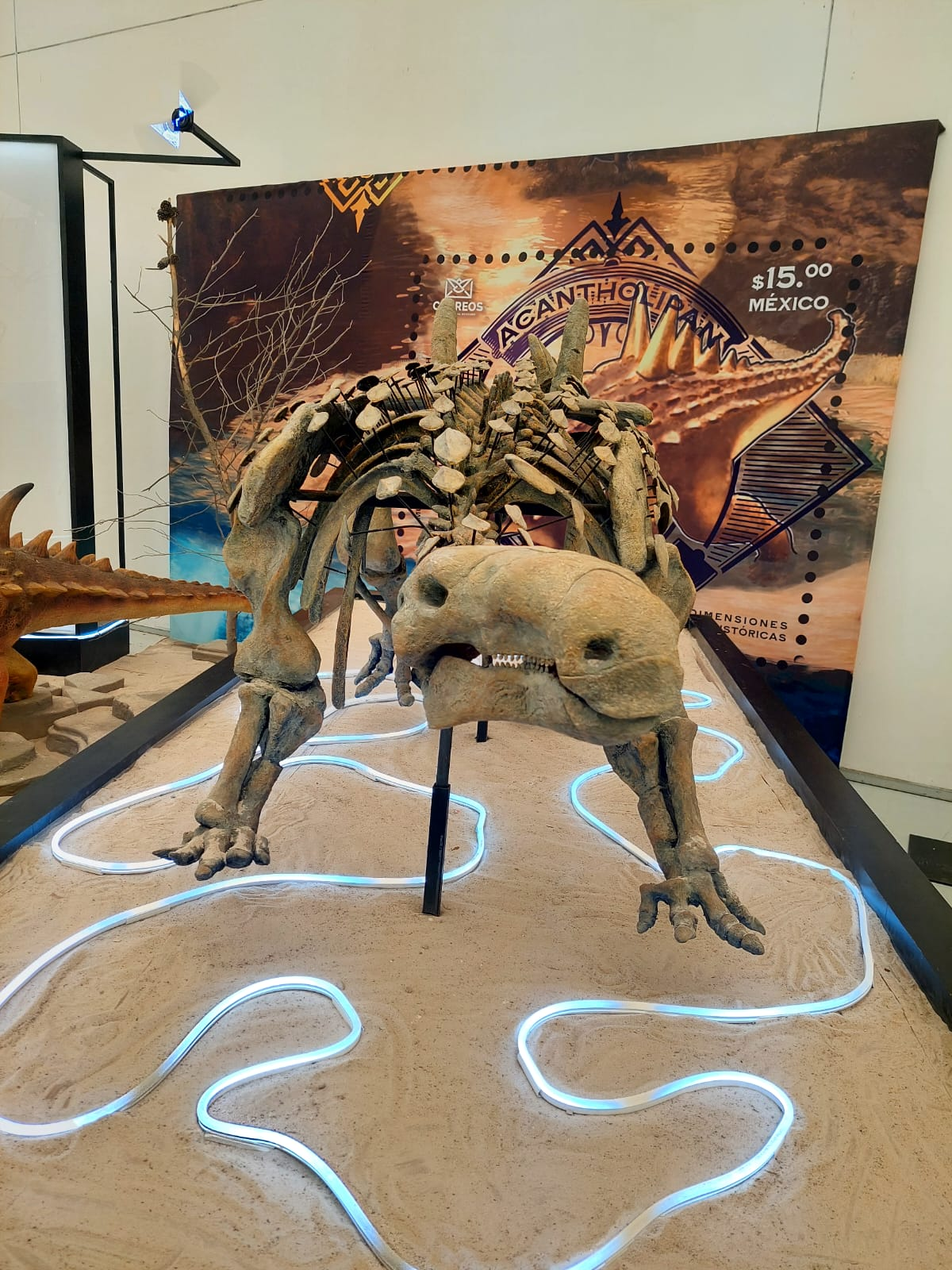
Reconstructed skeleton in Museo del Desierto

In the north of Mexico, fragmentary fossils have been found of nodosaurids. A partial skeleton excavated at Los Primos near San Miguel in Coahuila, was described in 2011. When Rivera-Sylva and colleagues reported the discovery of this specimen, CPC 272, they initially considered it too fragmentary to name. Later it was judged that the remains were sufficiently distinct to be given a binomial name.

In 2018, the type species Acantholipan gonzalezi was named by Rivera-Sylva et al. The generic name combines a Greek akanthos, "spine", with lipán, the usual Spanish designation of the Lépai-Ndé, the "Gray People", a tribe of the Apache inhabiting the area of the find. The specific name honours the Mexican paleontologist Arturo Homero González-González, the chairman of the Museo del Desierto at Saltillo. Acantholipan is the first ankylosaurian species named from Mexico.

The holotype specimen, CPC 272, was found alongside another nodosaur, CPC 273, in a marine layer of the Pen Formation and dates from the Santonian. It consists of partial skeleton lacking the skull. Its remains include a back vertebra, a tail vertebra, a piece of a rib, the underside of the left humerus, an upper left ulna, the underside of the left femur and a spike-like osteoderm probably from the posterior thorax. The fossil is part of the Colección Paleontológica de Coahuila, Museo del Desierto, Saltillo.

== Classification ==
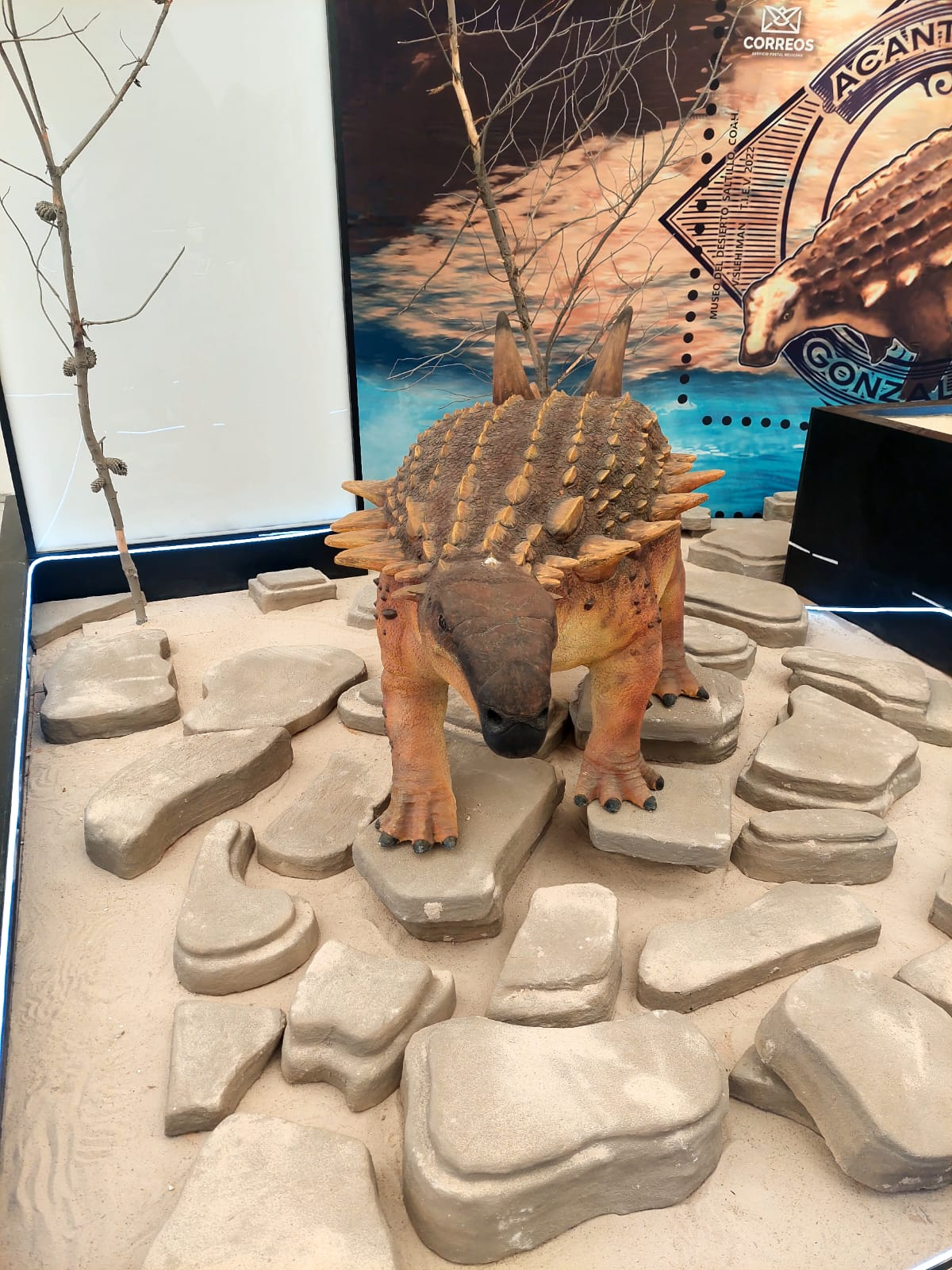
Model in Museo del Desierto

Acantholipan belongs to the Nodosaurinae and is the sister taxon to Nodosaurus. The 2018 phylogenetic analysis of Rivera-Sylva and colleagues is below:

- Nodosauridae
  - - Sauroplites
    - Mymoorapelta
    - Dongyangopelta
  - - Gastonia
    - - Gargoyleosaurus
      - - Polacanthinae
          - Hoplitosaurus
          - Polacanthus
        - Nodosaurinae
          - Peloroplites
          - - Taohelong
            - Sauropelta
            - - Acantholipan
              - Nodosaurus
              - - Niobrarasaurus
                - Ahshislepelta
              - - Tatankacephalus
                - - Silvisaurus
                  - - CPC 273
                    - - Panoplosaurini
                        - Animantarx
                        - - Panoplosaurus
                          - - Argentinian ankylosaur
                            - Texasetes
                            - Denversaurus
                            - Edmontonia longiceps
                            - Edmontonia rugosidens
                      - Struthiosaurini
                        - - Hungarosaurus
                          - Europelta
                        - - Pawpawsaurus
                          - Stegopelta
                          - Struthiosaurus languedocensis
                          - - Struthiosaurus transylvanicus
                            - Struthiosaurus austriacus

== See also ==
- 2018 in paleontology
- Timeline of ankylosaur research
