= Sauroplites =

Sauroplites Temporal range: Early Cretaceous, 125.45–112.6 Ma

Scientific classification
- Domain: Eukaryota
- Kingdom: Animalia
- Phylum: Chordata
- Clade: Dinosauria
- Clade: †Ornithischia
- Clade: †Thyreophora
- Clade: †Ankylosauria
- Genus: †Sauroplites; Bohlin, 1953
- Species: †S. scutiger

Binomial name
- †Sauroplites scutiger Bohlin, 1953

Extinct genus of dinosaurs

Sauroplites (meaning "saurian hoplite") is a genus of herbivorous ankylosaurian dinosaur from the Early Cretaceous of China.

== Discovery and naming ==
In 1930, the Swedish paleontologist Anders Birger Bohlin during the Swedish-Chinese expeditions of Sven Hedin discovered an ankylosaurian fossil near Tebch in Inner Mongolia.

The type species Sauroplites scutiger was named and described by Bohlin in 1953. The generic name is derived from Greek sauros or saura, "lizard", and hoplites, "hoplite, armed foot soldier". The specific name is Neo-Latin for "shield bearer", in reference to the body armour.

At first generally accepted as valid, even though a diagnosis had originally not been provided, Sauroplites was later often considered a nomen dubium because it is based on fragmentary material. Some believed it might actually be a specimen of another ankylosaur, Shamosaurus. However, in 2014 Victoria Megan Arbour discovered a clear unique trait, autapomorphy: the sacral or pelvic shield shows rosettes with a large central osteoderm surrounded by a single ring of smaller scutes. Other species have multiple or irregular rings. She concluded that Sauroplites was a valid taxon.

The specimens were not given an inventory number and are today lost, though some casts are present in the American Museum of Natural History as specimen AMNH 2074. They were found in a layer of the Zhidan Group, probably dating from the Barremian to Aptian stages. The carcass had been deposited on its back and the bones had been eroded away, apart from some ribs and perhaps a piece of an ischium, leaving parts of the body armour in a largely articulated position.

== Description ==
The large central osteoderms of the rosettes are rather flat and have a diameter of ten centimetres. More to the front oval osteoderms, with an asymmetric low keel, cover the back, with a length of up to forty centimetres. Thirty centimetre osteoderms cover the sides.

== Classification ==
Bohlin placed Sauroplites in the Ankylosauridae. However, Arbour (2014) considered it possible that it was a member of the Nodosauridae in view of the possession of a sacral shield consisting of fused rosettes which is unknown with unequivocal ankylosaurids, even though nodosaurid remains from Asia are rare and contentious. In a cladistic analysis she performed, Sauroplites was recovered as a nodosaurid.

In 2018, Rivera-Sylva and colleagues suggested that Sauroplites belonged to a clade of basal nodosaurids that also contained Dongyangopelta and Mymoorapelta, Their cladogram is shown below:

- Nodosauridae
  - - Sauroplites
    - Mymoorapelta
    - Dongyangopelta
  - - Gastonia
    - - Gargoyleosaurus
      - - Polacanthinae
          - Hoplitosaurus
          - Polacanthus
        - Nodosaurinae
          - Peloroplites
          - - Taohelong
            - Sauropelta
            - - Acantholipan
              - Nodosaurus
              - - Niobrarasaurus
                - Ahshislepelta
              - - Tatankacephalus
                - - Silvisaurus
                  - - CPC 273
                    - - Panoplosaurini
                        - Animantarx
                        - - Panoplosaurus
                          - - ‘’Patagopelta’’
                            - Texasetes
                            - Denversaurus
                            - Edmontonia longiceps
                            - Edmontonia rugosidens
                      - Struthiosaurini
                        - - Hungarosaurus
                          - Europelta
                        - - Pawpawsaurus
                          - Stegopelta
                          - Struthiosaurus languedocensis
                          - - Struthiosaurus transylvanicus
                            - Struthiosaurus austriacus

== See also ==
- Timeline of ankylosaur research
