= Dongyangopelta =

Dongyangopelta Temporal range: Albian-Cenomanian, 105–96 Ma

Scientific classification
- Kingdom: Animalia
- Phylum: Chordata
- Class: Reptilia
- Clade: Dinosauria
- Clade: †Ornithischia
- Clade: †Thyreophora
- Clade: †Ankylosauria
- Family: †Nodosauridae
- Genus: †Dongyangopelta; Chen et al., 2013

Type species
- †Dongyangopelta yangyanensis Chen et al., 2013

Extinct genus of dinosaurs

Dongyangopelta (meaning "Dongyang shield") is an monospecific genus of nodosaurid dinosaur that lived in China during the Early to Late Cretaceous period (Albian to Cenomanian stages, 105-96 Ma) in what is now the Chaochuan Formation. The type and only known species, Dongyangopelta yangyanensis, is known from a partial postcranial skeleton preserving osteoderms and ossified tendons. It was named in 2013 by Rongjun Chen, Wenjie Zheng, Yoichi Azuma, Masateru Shibata, Tianling Lou, Qiang Jin and Xinsheng Jin. Dongyangopelta represents one of the only nodosaurids known from Asia, along with Taohelong and Sauroplites.

== Discovery and naming ==
In October 2009, a partial skeleton of an ankylosaur was discovered by Zhiwei Yang in rocks of the Chaochuan Formation, in a hillside beside the Yangyan Village southeast of the Donyang City, Zhejiang Province, China. Subsequently, a joint excavation to retrieve the skeleton was conducted from September to October 2010 by a number of institutes such as the Zhejiang Museum of Natural History, Dongyang Museum, Fukui Prefectural Dinosaur Museum, Institute of Geology, Chinese Academy of Sciences and Hydrogeological Engineering Geological Brigade of Zhejiang Province. Notable individuals involved in the excavation and preparation of the specimen include Chaohe Yu and Guangming Luo. The Chaochuan Formation consists of purplish sandstones with interbedded igneous rock, while the layer bearing the partial skeleton consists of brown sandstone that lie in between gray igneous rocks. The layer dates to the Albian to Cenomanian stages of the Early to Late Cretaceous, 105 to 96 Ma.

The specimen was described and named by Rongjun Chen, Wenjie Zheng, Yoichi Azuma, Masateru Shibata, Tianliang Lou, Qiang Jin and Xingsheng Jin in 2013. The generic name, Dongyangopelta, combines the Chinese word "Dongyang", in reference to the Donyang City, and the Greek word "pelta" (shield). The specific name, yangyanensis, is in reference to the Yangyan Village. The holotype specimen, DYM F0136, consists of sacrodorsal vertebrae, sacral vertebrae, dorsal ribs, femur, pedal phalanges, partial Ilium fused to two sacral ribs, ossified tendons and numerous osteoderms.

== Description ==
The preserved sacrodorsal vertebrae of Dongyangopelta have large neural arches, small neural canals and an elongated centrum. The prezygapophyses and postzygapophyses of the sacrodorsal vertebrae are fused together. The sacral vertebrae have a broad centra, with no groove or ridge. Of the few vertebrae preserved, some have ribs that are fused to the transverse processes. The right ilium preserves hourglass shaped sacral ribs. The greater part of the illium projects above the articulation with the femur. The femur measures 46 cm (18.1 in) in length. It is straight and robust, with a curving posteriorly femoral shaft. The femoral head is distinct and is separated from the great trochanter by a change in slope. The distal end of the femur is robust, with a large medial condyle and a small lateral condyle. The non-ungual phalanges are broad and short. The ungual phalanx is rectangular and similarly broad to the non-ungual phalanges. Rod-like ossified tendons were preserved in the matrix and vary from compressed to circular in cross section.

The pelvic shield is made up of numerous fused osteoderms that form a rosette pattern, with the central, larger osteoderms not being completely ringed by smaller osteoderms. Numerous other osteoderms are known from different parts of the body, including thin triangular plates that range in length from 10 to 35 cm (3.9 to 13.8 in), domed osteoderms and cone-shaped osteoderms. Small, circular ossicles may have been arranged in a mosaic patterning around these types of osteoderms.

== Classification ==
Chen and colleagues (2013) assigned Dongyangopelta to the clade Nodosauridae, based on the femoral head being well separated from the great trochanter. A phylogenetic analysis found it to be sister taxon of the Asian Zhejiangosaurus. Later, a phylogenetic analysis performed by Arbour and Currie (2015) recovered it within a polytomy with Sauroplites and Taohelong at the base of Nodosauridae. A similar result was replicated by Rivera-Sylva and colleagues (2018), with the only difference being the inclusion of Mymoorapelta and the exclusion of Taohelong within the polytomy. A 2018 study performed by Zheng and colleagues considered it to be sister taxon to Mymoorapelta.

A phylogenetic analysis conducted by Rivera-Sylva et al. (2018) and modified by Madzia et al. (2021) is reproduced below.

- Nodosauridae
  - - Sauroplites
    - Mymoorapelta
    - Dongyangopelta
  - - Gastonia
    - - Gargoyleosaurus
      - - Polacanthinae
          - Hoplitosaurus
          - Polacanthus
        - Nodosaurinae
          - Peloroplites
          - - Taohelong
            - Sauropelta
            - - Acantholipan
              - Nodosaurus
              - - Niobrarasaurus
                - Ahshislepelta
              - - Tatankacephalus
                - - Silvisaurus
                  - - CPC 273
                    - - Panoplosaurini
                        - Animantarx
                        - - Panoplosaurus
                          - - Argentinian ankylosaur (Patagopelta)
                            - Texasetes
                            - Denversaurus
                            - Edmontonia longiceps
                            - Edmontonia rugosidens
                      - Struthiosaurini
                        - - Hungarosaurus
                          - Europelta
                        - - Pawpawsaurus
                          - Stegopelta
                          - Struthiosaurus languedocensis
                          - - Struthiosaurus transylvanicus
                            - Struthiosaurus austriacus

== See also ==
- Timeline of ankylosaur research
