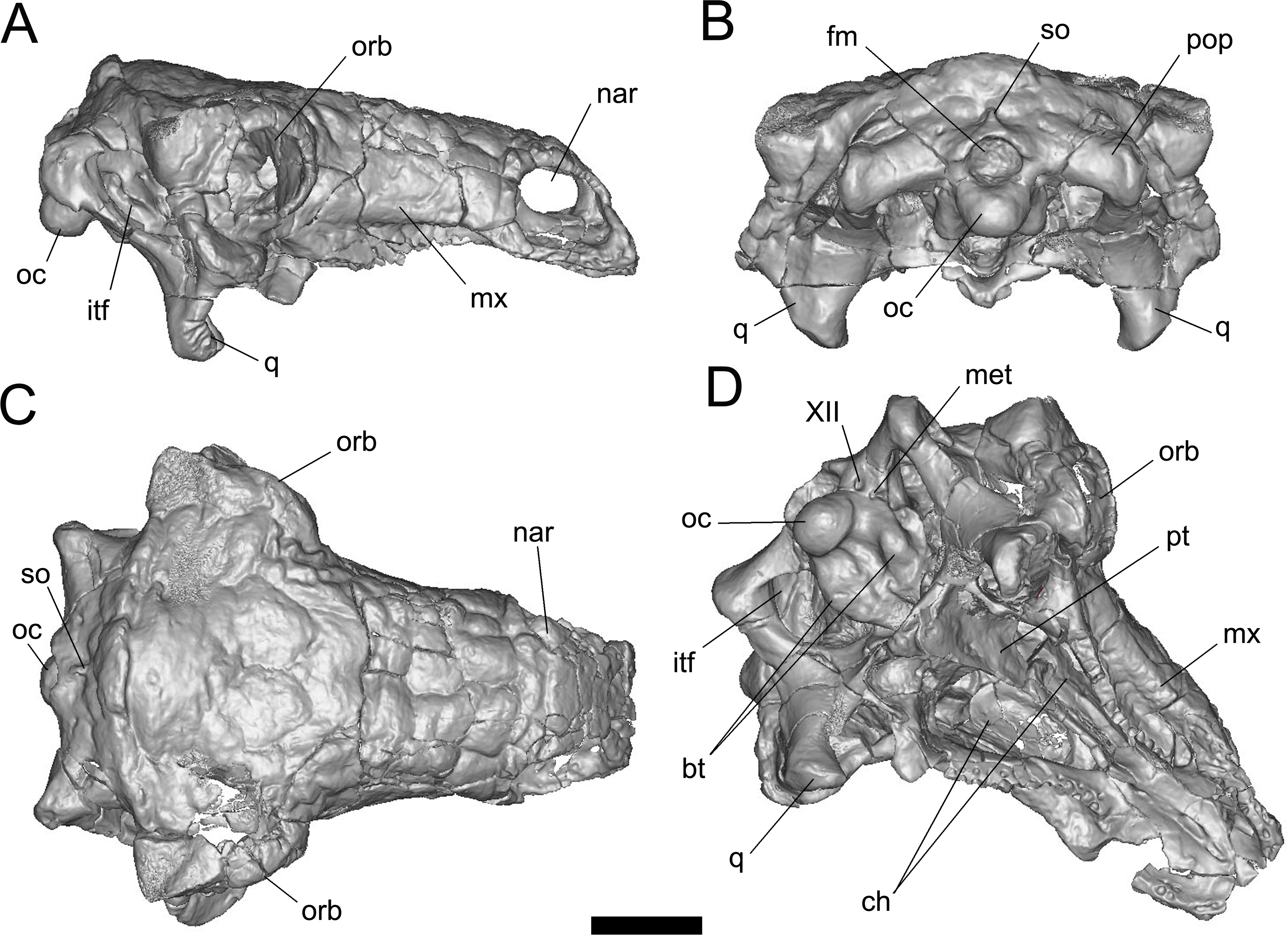
- Skull in side, top, back and bottom views

Scientific classification
- Kingdom: Animalia
- Phylum: Chordata
- Class: Reptilia
- Clade: Dinosauria
- Clade: †Ornithischia
- Clade: †Thyreophora
- Clade: †Ankylosauria
- Family: †Nodosauridae
- Subfamily: †Nodosaurinae
- Clade: †Struthiosaurini
- Genus: †Pawpawsaurus; Lee, 1996
- Species: †P. campbelli

Binomial name
- †Pawpawsaurus campbelli Lee, 1996

= Pawpawsaurus =

Pawpawsaurus Temporal range: Early Cretaceous (Albian), 105–100 Ma

Extinct species of reptile

Pawpawsaurus, meaning "Pawpaw Lizard", is a nodosaurid ankylosaur from the Cretaceous (late Albian) of Tarrant County, Texas, discovered in May 1992. The only species yet assigned to this taxon, Pawpawsaurus campbelli, is based on a complete skull (lacking mandibles) from the marine Paw Paw Formation (Washita Group).

== Discovery ==
Pawpawsaurus was found in the Paw Paw Formation in Tarrant County, Texas, in May 1992, by Cameron Campbell. A complete skull, SMU 73203, is the only specimen, from which the binomial was named Pawpawsaurus campbelli. The Paw Paw Formation has produced another nodosaurid, Texasetes pleurohalio (Coombs, 1995), which may prove to be a senior synonym of Pawpawsaurus. This is the only nodosaurid known to have possessed the bony eyelids commonly found in ankylosaurids. The skull of Pawpawsaurus bears some notable similarities to that of Silvisaurus, such as the presence of teeth in the premaxilla and the restriction of the osseous secondary palate to the rostral portion of the palatal region.

== Description ==
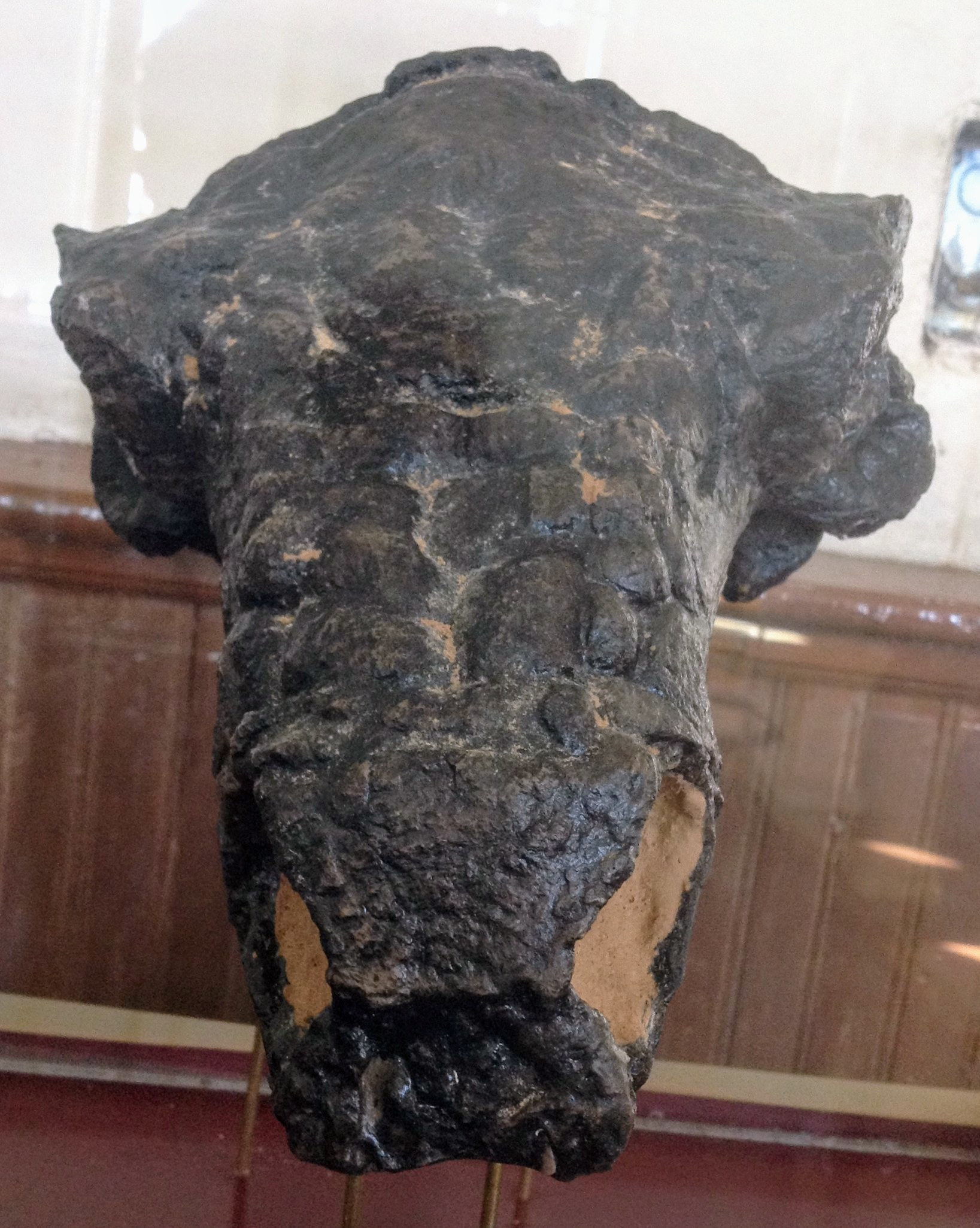
Skull cast in front view

Pawpawsaurus was a medium-sized nodosaur measuring 4.5 metres (15 ft) long. It is known from a relatively well preserved and complete skull. The skull is complete enough for a 2016 study to be able to identify and reconstruct the brain, nasal cavities and inner ear of the specimen, and CT scan it to find new anatomical features.

The brain of Pawpawsaurus is very similar to other ankylosaurians, but along with more derived taxa it is most different from Kunbarrasaurus. The brain is 30% of the skull length, very similar to Panoplosaurus, higher than Euoplocephalus, and lower than Kunbarrasaurus. The brain of Pawpawsaurus is 96 millimetres (3.8 in) long and 35 millimetres (1.4 in) wide. The inner ear is also similar to ankylosaurians to the exclusion of Kunbarrasaurus, being 27 millimetres (1.1 in) tall and 15.5 millimetres (0.61 in) wide at the level of the semicircular canals. The nasal cavities of Pawpawsaurus resemble that of Panoplosaurus and Euoplocephalus, although the thin dividing medians are not preserved as they were likely cartilaginous.

== Classification ==
Vickaryous et al. (2004) have stated that "Sauropelta edwardsorum, Silvisaurus condrayi, and Pawpawsaurus campbelli form a basal polytomy nested deep to Cedarpelta." Alternatively, Pawpawsaurus has been identified as a relative of Struthiosaurus, with cladogram below showing the results of the 2018 phylogenetic analysis of Rivera-Sylva and colleagues, resolving Pawpawsaurus within the clade Struthiosaurini as labelled by Madzia et al., with relationships outside Struthiosaurini excluded for simplicity.

- Struthiosaurini
  - - Hungarosaurus
    - Europelta
  - - Pawpawsaurus
    - Stegopelta
    - Struthiosaurus languedocensis
    - - Struthiosaurus transylvanicus
      - Struthiosaurus austriacus

However, the strict consensus tree of a phylogenetic analysis performed by Brown et al. (2017) placed Pawpawsaurus in a clade with Borealopelta markmitchelli and Europelta carbonensis. The results of the strict consensus are displayed in the phylogeny below, with taxa outside Nodosauridae being excluded.

- Nodosauridae
  - - Sauroplites scutiger
    - Mymoorapelta maysi
    - Dongyangopelta yangyanensis
  - - Gastonia burgei
    - - Gargoyleosaurus parkpinorum
      - - Polacanthus foxii
        - - Peloroplites cedrimontanus
          - - Sauropelta edwardsi
            - - Nodosaurus textilis
              - - Tatankacephalus cooneyorum
                - - Silvisaurus condrayi
                  - - Animantarx ramaljonesi
                    - - Hungarosaurus tormai
                      - - Europelta carbonensis
                        - - Pawpawsaurus campbelli
                          - Borealopelta markmitchelli
                    - - - Struthiosaurus austriacus
                        - Stegopelta landerensis
                      - - Panoplosaurus mirus
                        - - Edmontonia rugosidens
                          - Edmontonia longiceps
                          - Denversaurus schlessmani

== Palaeobiology ==
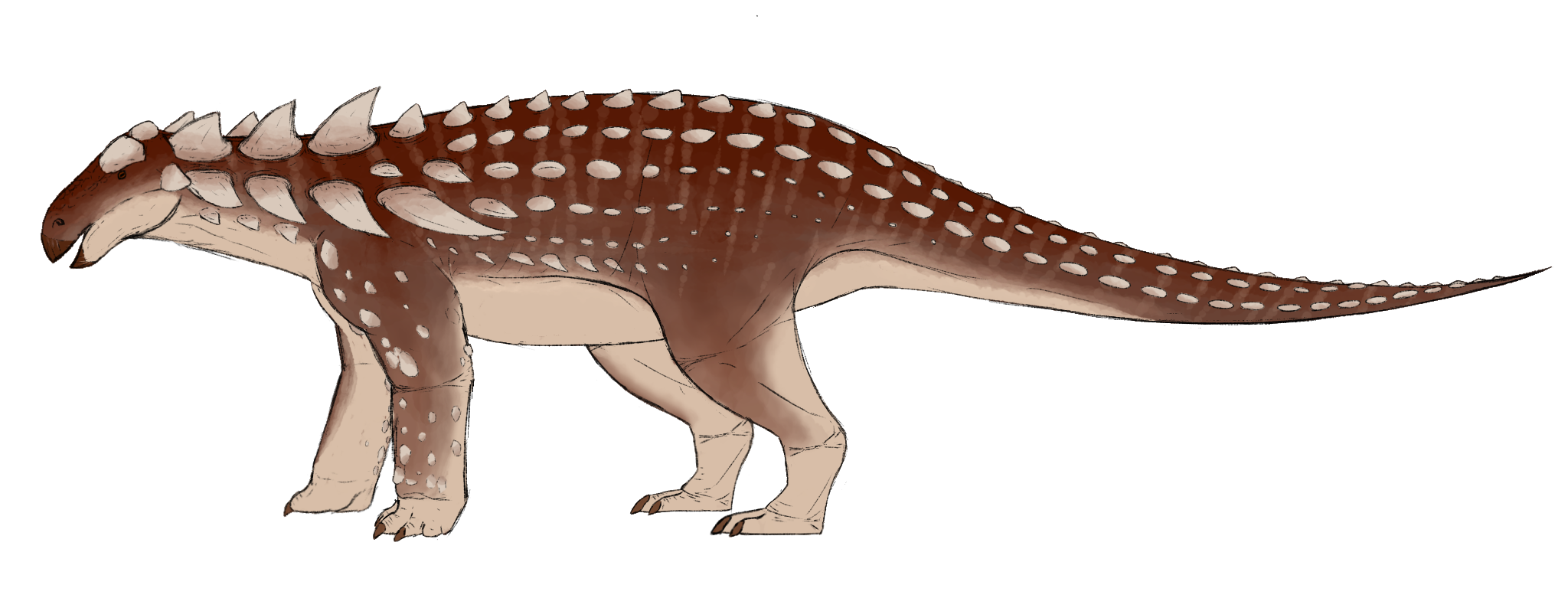
Restoration of Pawpawsaurus campbelli

Pawpawsaurus was primitive in regards to its sensory abilities when compared to later ankylosaurs. CT scans of its skull and brain by Paulina-Carabajal and Louis Jacobs et al. revealed that Pawpawsaurus' hearing was on par with that of modern crocodilians, indicating that its hearing was relatively poor. Its sense of smell meanwhile, while not as advanced as that of later ankylosaurs, was still more powerful and acute than many of the theropods existent at the time thanks to its large nasal cavities. The enlarged nasal cavities of Pawpawsaurus would also likely have been useful for cooling blood that was entering the brain, finding food and potential mates, or alerting it to danger.

== See also ==
- Timeline of ankylosaur research
