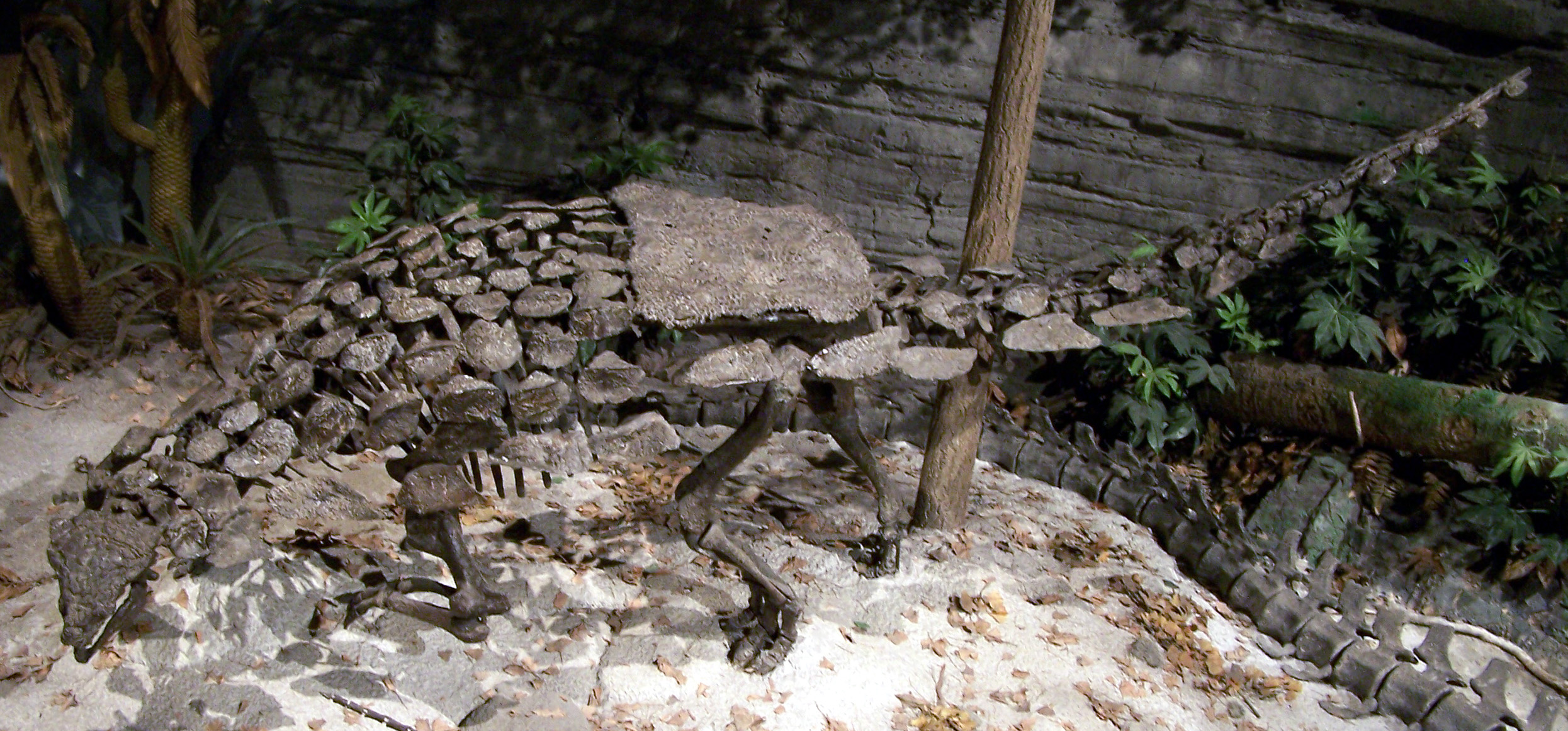
- Gargoyleosaurus skeleton cast

Scientific classification
- Kingdom: Animalia
- Phylum: Chordata
- Class: Reptilia
- Clade: Dinosauria
- Clade: †Ornithischia
- Clade: †Thyreophora
- Clade: †Ankylosauria
- Clade: †Euankylosauria
- Family: †Nodosauridae; Marsh, 1890

Subgroups
- †Acanthopholis; †Anoplosaurus; †Dongyangopelta; †Gargoyleosaurus; †Gastonia; †Glyptodontopelta; †Horshamosaurus; †Hylaeosaurus?; †Invictarx; †Mymoorapelta?; †Priconodon?; †Propanoplosaurus; †Rhadinosaurus; †Sauroplites; †Polacanthinae?; †Nodosaurinae? Abel, 1919; †Acantholipan; †Ahshislepelta?; †Borealopelta; †Niobrarasaurus; †Nodosaurus; †Peloroplites?; †Sauropelta; †Silvisaurus; †Taohelong?; †Tatankacephalus; †Panoplosaurini? Madzia et al., 2021; †Animantarx; †Denversaurus; †Edmontonia; †Nipponopelta; †Panoplosaurus; †Texasetes; †Struthiosaurini? Madzia et al., 2021; †Ahshislepelta?; †Europelta; †Hungarosaurus; †Niobrarasaurus?; †Pawpawsaurus; †Stegopelta; †Struthiosaurus

Synonyms
- Acanthopholidae Nopcsa, 1917; Acanthopholididae Nopcsa, 1902; Hylaeosauridae? Nopcsa, 1902; Palaeoscincidae Nopcsa, 1918; Panoplosauridae Nopcsa, 1929; Struthiosauridae Kuhn, 1966

= Nodosauridae =

Nodosaurids Temporal range: Late Jurassic–Late Cretaceous, 155–66 Ma

Extinct family of armored dinosaurs

Nodosauridae is a family of ankylosaurian dinosaurs known from the Late Jurassic to the Late Cretaceous periods in what is now Asia, Europe, North America, and possibly South America. While traditionally regarded as a monophyletic clade as the sister taxon to the Ankylosauridae, some analyses recover it as a paraphyletic grade leading to the ankylosaurids.

== Description ==
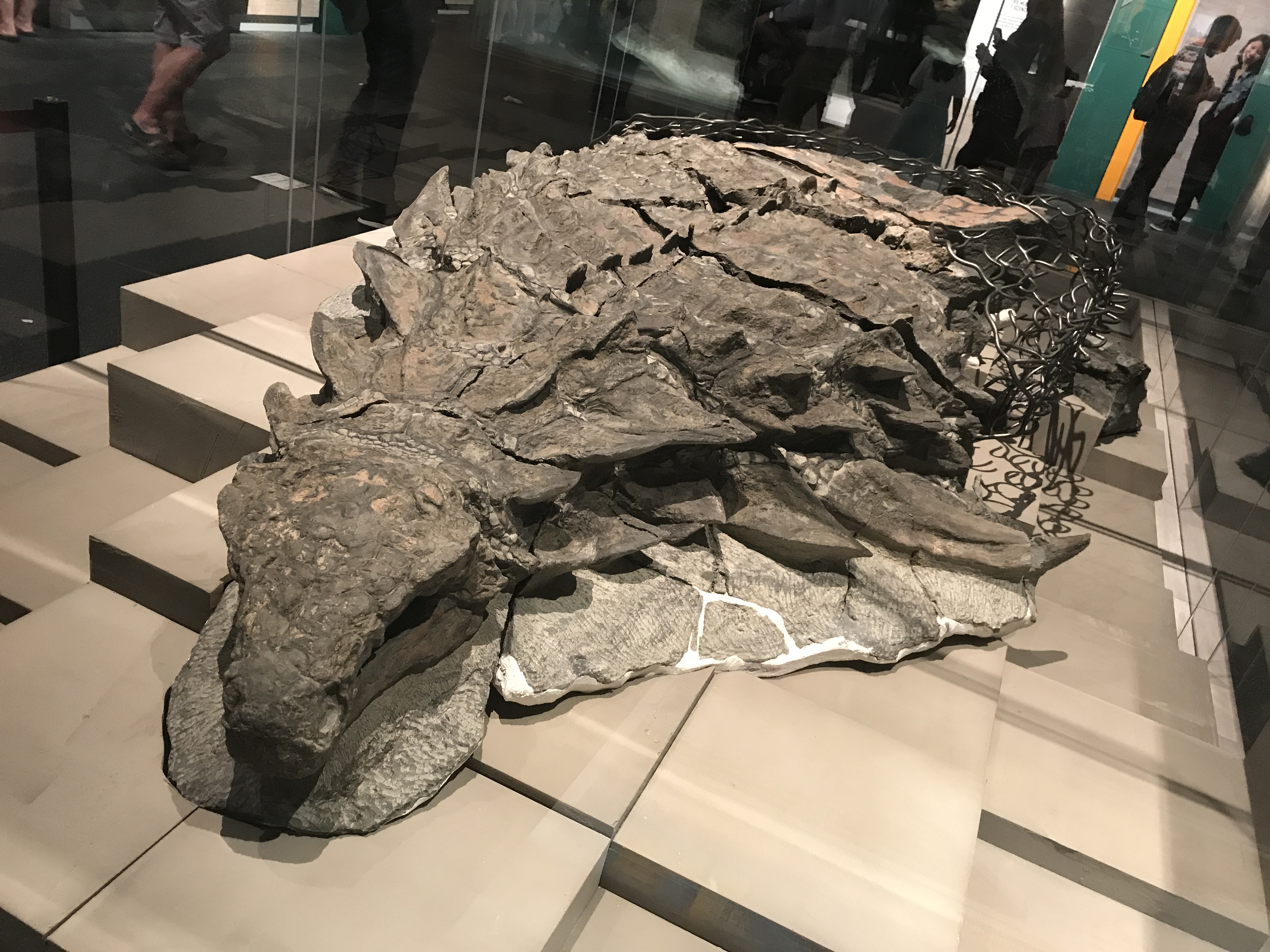
The holotype of Borealopelta markmitchelli on display at the Royal Tyrrell Museum

Nodosaurids, like their sister group the ankylosaurids, were heavily armored dinosaurs adorned with rows of bony armor nodules and spines (osteoderms), which were covered in keratin sheaths. Ankylosaurians were small- to large-sized, heavily built, quadrupedal, herbivorous dinosaurs, possessing small, leaf-shaped teeth. Unlike ankylosaurids, nodosaurids lacked mace-like tail clubs and instead had more flexible tail tips. Many nodosaurids had spikes projecting outward from their shoulders. One particularly well-preserved nodosaurid "mummy", the holotype of Borealopelta markmitchelli, preserves a nearly complete set of armor in life position, as well as the keratin covering and mineralized remains of the underlying skin, which indicate reddish pigments in a countershading pattern.

== Classification ==
The family Nodosauridae was erected by Othniel Charles Marsh in 1890, and anchored on the genus Nodosaurus.

The clade Nodosauridae was first informally defined by Paul Sereno in 1998 as "all ankylosaurs closer to Panoplosaurus than to Ankylosaurus," a definition followed by Vickaryous, Teresa Maryańska, and Weishampel in 2004. Vickaryous et al. considered two genera of nodosaurids to be of uncertain placement (incertae sedis): Struthiosaurus and Animantarx, and considered the most primitive member of the Nodosauridae to be Cedarpelta.

Following the publication of the PhyloCode, Nodosauridae needed to be formally defined following certain parameters, including that the type genus Nodosaurus was required as an internal specifier. In formally defining Nodosauridae, Madzia and colleagues followed the previously established use for the clade, defining it as the largest clade including Nodosaurus textilis but not Ankylosaurus magniventris. As all phylogenies referenced included both Panoplosaurus and Nodosaurus within the same group relative to Ankylosaurus, the addition of another internal specifier was deemed unnecessary.

Nodosauridae is traditionally composed of the basal clade Polacanthinae (sometimes recovered outside of the Nodosauridae), as well as the Panoplosaurini and Struthiosaurini within the Nodosaurinae. Nodosaurinae is defined in the PhyloCode as "the largest clade containing Nodosaurus textilis, but not Hylaeosaurus armatus, Mymoorapelta maysi, and Polacanthus foxii". Panoplosaurini is defined in the PhyloCode as "the largest clade containing Panoplosaurus mirus, but not Nodosaurus textilis and Struthiosaurus austriacus" while Struthiosaurini has a similar definition of "the largest clade containing Struthiosaurus austriacus, but not Nodosaurus textilis and Panoplosaurus mirus". Topology A below demonstrates these relationships, following the phylogenetic analyses of Rivera-Sylva and colleagues (2018), with clade names added by definition from Madzia et al. (2021). However, in 2023, Raven and colleagues proposed an alternate phylogeny for nodosaurids; instead of the traditional dichotomous split between nodosaurids and ankylosaurids, their analyses resulted in a paraphyletic grade of these taxa comprising the monophyletic clades Panoplosauridae, Polacanthidae and Struthiosauridae. These results are displayed in Topology B below. Corresponding clades are shown in matching colors for clarity, and ⊞ buttons can be clicked to expand nodes:

Topology A: Rivera-Sylva et al. (2018) dataset

- Ankylosauria
  - Nodosauridae
    - - Sauroplites
      - Mymoorapelta
      - Dongyangopelta
    - - Gastonia
      - - Gargoyleosaurus
        - - Polacanthinae
            ⊞
            - - Hoplitosaurus
              - Polacanthus
            ⊟
          - Nodosaurinae
            - Peloroplites
            - - Taohelong
              - Sauropelta
              - - Acantholipan
                - Nodosaurus
                - - Niobrarasaurus
                  - Ahshislepelta
                - - Tatankacephalus
                  - - Silvisaurus
                    - - CPC 273 (Aguja Formation specimen)
                      - - Struthiosaurini
                          ⊞
                          - - Hungarosaurus
                            - Europelta
                          - - - Pawpawsaurus
                              - Borealopelta
                            - Stegopelta
                            - Struthiosaurus languedocensis
                            - - Struthiosaurus transylvanicus
                              - Struthiosaurus austriacus
                          ⊟
                        - Panoplosaurini
                          ⊞
                          - Animantarx
                          - - Panoplosaurus
                            - - Patagopelta
                              - Texasetes
                              - Denversaurus
                              - Edmontonia longiceps
                              - Edmontonia rugosidens
                          ⊟
  - Ankylosauridae
    ⊞
    - Kunbarrasaurus
    - - Paw Paw juvenile
      - Hylaeosaurus
      - - Liaoningosaurus
        - Crichtonpelta
        - Chuanqilong
        - Cedarpelta
        - Aletopelta
        - Later-diverging ankylosaurids
    ⊟

Topology B: Raven et al. (2023) dataset

- Ankylosauria
  - Sarcolestes
  - - Paw Paw juvenile
    - - Animantarx
      - - Cedarpelta
        - - Gargoyleosaurus
          - - Polacanthidae
              ⊞
              - Hoplitosaurus
              - - - Niobrarasaurus
                  - Polacanthus
                - - Texasetes
                  - - Patagopelta
                    - - Hylaeosaurus
                      - - Gastonia burgei
                        - - Gastonia lorriemcwhinneyae
                          - Peloroplites
              ⊟
            - - - Sauropelta
                - Tatankacephalus
              - - - Invictarx
                - - Struthiosauridae
                    ⊞
                    - - Silvisaurus
                      - Taohelong
                    - - Europelta
                      - - Struthiosaurus transylvanicus
                        - - Struthiosaurus languedocensis
                          - - Struthiosaurus austriacus
                            - - Hungarosaurus
                              - Pawpawsaurus
                    ⊟
                  - Panoplosauridae
                    ⊞
                    - Tianchisaurus
                    - - - Panoplosaurus
                        - - Denversaurus
                          - Edmontonia longiceps
                      - - Nodosaurus
                        - - Edmontonia rugosidens
                          - - Anoplosaurus
                            - Dracopelta
                    ⊟
                - Ankylosauridae
                  ⊞
                  - - Borealopelta
                    - - Mymoorapelta
                      - Stegopelta
                  - - - Vectipelta
                      - - Dongyangopelta
                        - Zhejiangosaurus
                    - - Ahshislepelta
                      - - - Aletopelta
                          - Talarurus
                        - - Shamosaurinae
                          - Ankylosaurinae
                  ⊟

Nodosaurinae is defined as the largest clade containing Nodosaurus textilis but not Hylaeosaurus armatus, Mymoorapelta maysi, or Polacanthus foxii, and was formally defined in 2021 by Madzia and colleagues, who utilized the name of Othenio Abel in 1919, who created the term to unite Ankylosaurus, Hierosaurus and Stegopelta. The name has been significantly refined in content since Abel first used it to unite all quadrupedal, plate-armoured ornithischians, now including a significant number of taxa from the Early Cretaceous through Maastrichtian of Europe, North America, and Argentina. Previous informal definitions of the group described the clade as all taxa closer to Panoplosaurus, or Panoplosaurus and Nodosaurus, than to the early ankylosaurs Sarcolestes, Hylaeosaurus, Mymoorapelta or Polacanthus, which was reflected in the specifiers chosen by Madzia et al. when formalizing the clade following the PhyloCode. The 2018 phylogenetic analysis of Rivera-Sylva and colleagues was used as the primary reference for Panoplosaurini by Madzia et al., in addition to the supplemental analyses of Thompson et al. (2012), Arbour and Currie (2016), Arbour et al. (2016), and Brown et al. (2017).

Panoplosaurini is defined as the largest clade containing Panoplosaurus mirus, but not Nodosaurus textilis or Struthiosaurus austriacus, and was named in 2021 by Madzia and colleagues for the group found in many previous analyses, both morphological and phylogenetic. Panoplosaurini includes not only the Late Cretaceous Panoplosaurus, Denversaurus and Edmontonia, but also the mid Cretaceous Animantarx and Texasetes, as well as Patagopelta. However, in the study describing it, its authors only placed it as a nodosaurine outside Panoplosaurini. The approximately equivalent clade Panoplosaurinae, named in 1929 by Franz Nopcsa, but was not significantly used until Robert Bakker reused the name in 1988, alongside the new clades Edmontoniinae and Edmontoniidae, which were considered to unite Panoplosaurus, Denversaurus and Edmontonia to the exclusion of other ankylosaurs. As none of the clades were commonly used, or formally named following the PhyloCode, Madzia et al. named Panoplosaurini instead, as the group of taxa fell within the clade Nodosaurinae, and having the same -inae suffix on both parent and child taxon could be confusing in future. The 2018 phylogenetic analysis of Rivera-Sylva and colleagues was used as the primary reference for Panoplosaurini by Madzia et al., in addition to the supplemental analyses of Arbour et al. (2016), Brown et al. (2017), and Zheng et al. (2018).

Struthiosaurini is defined as the largest clade containing Struthiosaurus austriacus, but not Nodosaurus textilis or Panoplosaurus mirus, and was named in 2021 by Madzia and colleagues for the relatively stable group found in many previous analyses. Struthiosaurini includes not only the Late Cretaceous European Struthiosaurus, but also the Early Cretaceous European Europelta, the Late Cretaceous European Hungarosaurus, and Stegopelta and Pawpawsaurus from the mid Cretaceous of North America. The approximately equivalent clade Struthiosaurinae, named in 1923 by Franz Nopcsa was previously used to include European nodosaurids, but was never formally named following the PhyloCode, so Madzia et al. named Struthiosaurini instead, as the group of taxa fell within the clade Nodosaurinae, and having the same -inae suffix on both parent and child taxon could be confusing in future. The 2018 phylogenetic analysis of Rivera-Sylva and colleagues was used as the primary reference for Struthiosaurini by Madzia et al., in addition to the supplemental analyses of Arbour et al. (2016), Brown et al. (2017), and Zheng et al. (2018).

== Biogeography ==
Nodosaurids are known from diverse remains throughout Europe, Asia, and North America.

Some Gondwanan ankylosaurs, including the Antarctican Antarctopelta and Argentinian Patagopelta, were originally regarded as belonging to the Nodosauridae, but later analyses provided support for them belonging to the Parankylosauria, a separate lineage of basal ankylosaurs restricted to the Southern Hemisphere.

Chronostratigraphy of nodosaurid genera

== See also ==
- Timeline of ankylosaur research
