= Pen Formation =

The Pen Formation is a Campanian-age geologic unit in the western United States.

== Vertebrate fauna ==
Sharks are well known from the Pen Formation.

- Lonchidion selachos
- Squalicorax kaupi
- Cretorectolobus olsoni
- Ischyrhiza mira
- Scapanorhynchus texanus
- S. raphiodon
- Cretolamna appendiculata

Other fishes include Xiphactinus, the ray Ptychotrygon, and gar. The nodosaurid ankylosaurs Acantholipan and CPC 273 have also been found in the Pen Formation.
