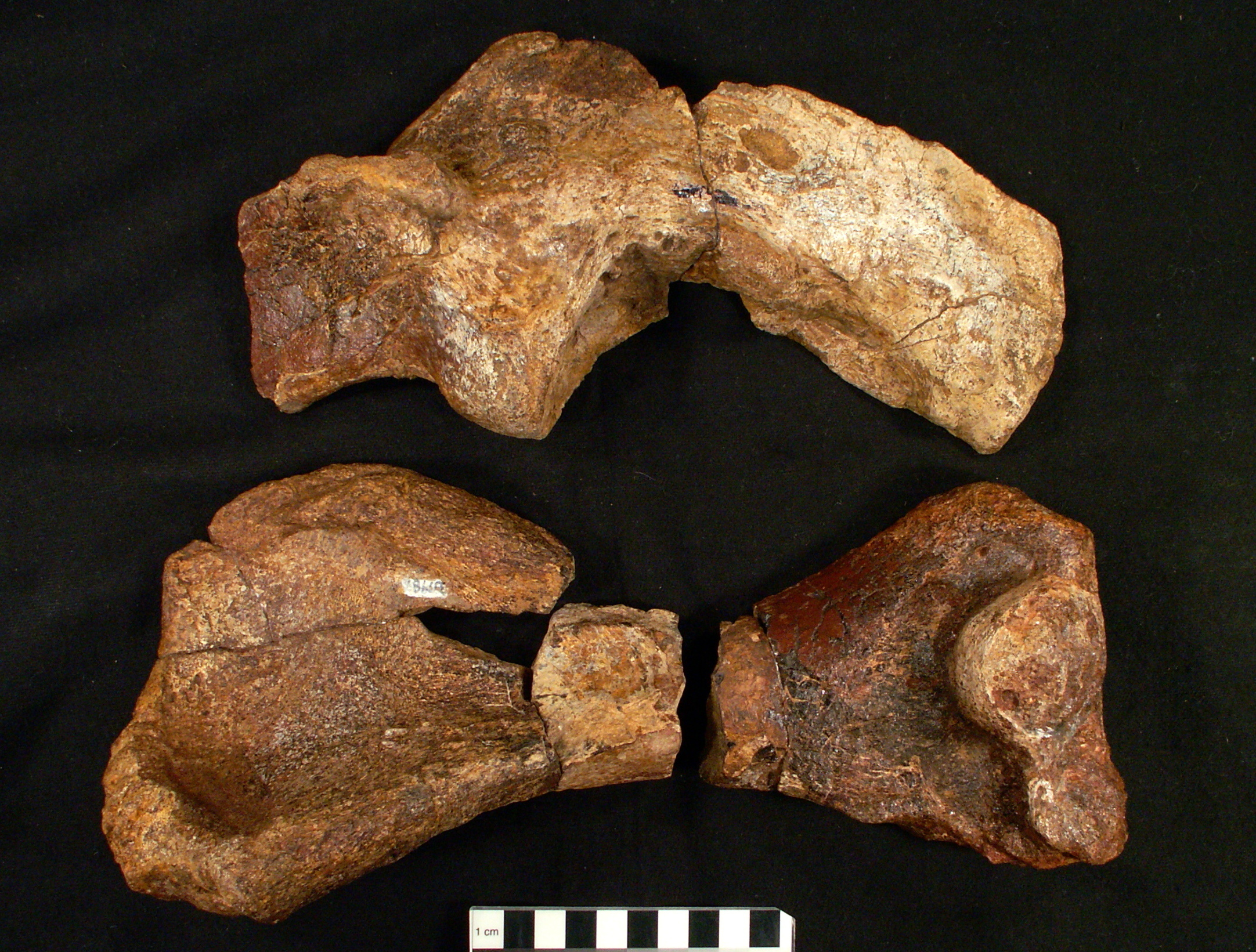
- The holotype coracoid (top) and humerus (bottom) at the USNM.

Scientific classification
- Kingdom: Animalia
- Phylum: Chordata
- Class: Reptilia
- Clade: Dinosauria
- Clade: †Ornithischia
- Clade: †Thyreophora
- Clade: †Ankylosauria
- Family: †Nodosauridae
- Subfamily: †Nodosaurinae
- Clade: †Panoplosaurini
- Genus: †Texasetes; Coombs, 1995
- Species: †T. pleurohalio

Binomial name
- †Texasetes pleurohalio Coombs, 1995

= Texasetes =

Texasetes Temporal range: Early Cretaceous, 100 Ma

Extinct genus of dinosaurs

Texasetes (meaning "Texas resident") is a genus of ankylosaurian dinosaurs from the late Lower Cretaceous of North America. This poorly known genus has been recovered from the Paw Paw Formation (late Albian) near Haslet, Tarrant County, Texas, which has also produced the nodosaurid ankylosaur Pawpawsaurus.

== Discovery and taphonomy ==
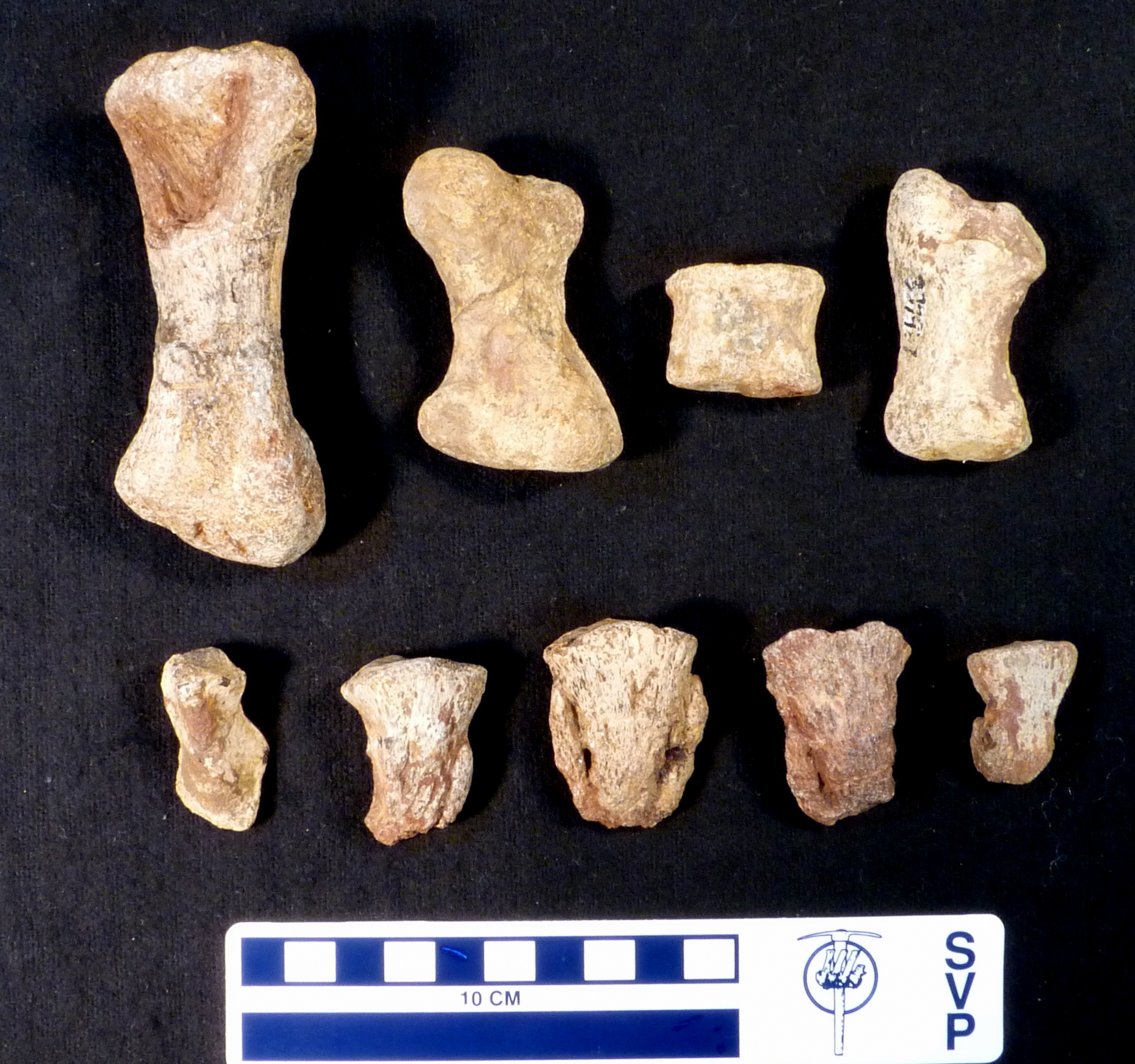
The holotype unguals (bottom) and phalanges (top) at the USNM.

5 miles south of Haslet near Fort Worth, Texas, fossils of an ankylosaurid were excavated from strata of the upper Albian rocks from Lower Cretaceous in the Pawpaw Formation. The fossils would later become the holotype (USNM 337987) of Texasetes, consisting of a skull fragment, 2 teeth, 5 cervical centra, 3 sacral centra, 16 caudal centra, partial scapulacoracoids, fragmentary pelvis, humeri, femora, tibiae, proximal ulnae, proximal radii, left metacarpal IV, left metatarsal IV, 3 phalanges, 2 unguals, and several osteoderms. These remains had initially been labeled as those of a sauropod, but were many years later recognized as ankylosaurian by M.K. Brett-Surman. They were subsequently studied by ankylosaur expert Walter Preston Coombs, Jr, who named them in 1995 as the type species Texasetes pleurohalio, the generic name meaning "Texas dweller" and the specific name meaning "sea adjacent". Vickaryous et al. (2004) and Coombs (1995) describe Texasetes as having a horizontally oriented ilium, an imperforate acetabulum, and "characteristically ankylosaur scapula morphology, including a prominent acromion and prespinous fossa."

Due to a lack of collection records, parts of the discovery and preservation of Texasestes remain unknown. Strangely, the specimen preserved little dorsal armor or ribs, the fossils most commonly found in ankylosaur skeletons. This led Coombs to speculate that the individual had died on the shore or in an inland river and had been flushed out to sea, decomposing and losing many of its elements like the distal limbs. The individual was then buried quickly in marine sediments, according to the theory. This theory is the origin of the taxon's specific name meaning. Additional evidence comes in the form of paleo ecology, with nodosaurids and basal ankylosaurs being more commonly found in fluvial or marine sediments than ankylosaurids.

== Description ==
Due to the fragmentary nature of Texasetes, little is known directly from the fossils and the uncertain phylogenetic position limits inferable traits. The preserved teeth are unique in that they have a large ridge leading up to the apex of the tooth's crown, with this feature known in only one other taxon from southern England. The cervical vertebrae of Texasetes are concave, a trait shared with Animantarx, a possibly autapomorphy for the two. Texasetes preserves a highly elongated coracoid and thick glenoid plate compared to its relative Animantarx. Coombs (1995) diagnose Texasetes as having a horizontally oriented ilium, an imperforate acetabulum, and "characteristically ankylosaur scapula morphology, including a prominent acromion and prespinous fossa." Due to the taxon being a Nodosaurid, the taxon was covered in large armored osteoderms with smaller ossicles in-between, as inferred by Panoplosaurus, and no tail club.

== Classification ==
Coombs assigned the specimen to the family Nodosauridae, but Vickaryous et al. consider it Ankylosauria incertae sedis. Pawpawsaurus may be synonymous with Texasetes due to their shared age, formation, and close phylogenetic position, though lack of overlap prevents a confident answer and in Arbour et al., 2016's phylogenetic analysis however, Pawpawsaurus was found closer to Europelta and Texasetes closer to Edmontonia. Additionally, a juvenile ankylosaur skeleton from the Paw Paw Formation was found to be closest related to neither Pawpawsaurus or Texasetes, but Niobrarasaurus in the 2016 analysis. The 2018 phylogenetic analysis of Rivera-Sylva and colleagues is used below, limited to the relationships within Panoplosaurini.

- Panoplosaurini
  - Animantarx
  - - Panoplosaurus
    - - Argentinian ankylosaur (Patagopelta)
      - Texasetes
      - Denversaurus
      - Edmontonia longiceps
      - Edmontonia rugosidens

== See also ==
- Animantarx
- Pawpawsaurus
- Texan paleontology
- Timeline of ankylosaur research

== Sources ==
- Coombs, W. P. 1995. A nodosaurid ankylosaur (Dinosauria: Ornithischia) from the Lower Cretaceous of Texas. Journal of Vertebrate Paleontology 15(2):298-312.
- Lee, Y.-N. 1996. A new nodosaurid ankylosaur (Dinosauria, Ornithischia) from the Paw Paw Formation (late Albian) of Texas. Journal of Vertebrate Paleontology 16:232-245.
- Vickaryous, Maryanska, and Weishampel 2004. Chapter Seventeen: Ankylosauria. in The Dinosauria (2nd edition), Weishampel, D. B., Dodson, P., and Osmólska, H., editors. University of California Press.
