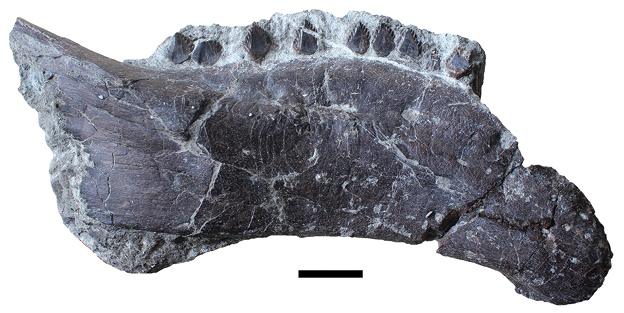
- Right dentary

Scientific classification
- Kingdom: Animalia
- Phylum: Chordata
- Class: Reptilia
- Clade: Dinosauria
- Clade: †Ornithischia
- Clade: †Thyreophora
- Clade: †Ankylosauria
- Family: †Nodosauridae
- Subfamily: †Nodosaurinae
- Clade: †Struthiosaurini
- Genus: †Hungarosaurus; Ősi, 2005
- Species: †H. tormai

Binomial name
- †Hungarosaurus tormai Ősi, 2005

= Hungarosaurus =

Hungarosaurus Temporal range: Santonian, 85 Ma

Extinct species of reptile

Hungarosaurus (meaning 'Hungarian lizard' from the Latin Hungaria, 'Hungary', and Greek σαυρος/sauros, 'lizard') is an extinct genus of nodosaurid ankylosaurian dinosaur from the Upper Cretaceous (Santonian) Csehbánya Formation of the Bakony Mountains, western Hungary. The type (and only) species is H. tormai, and represents the most completely known ankylosaur from the Cretaceous of Europe. Hungarosaurus walked on four legs and its body was covered with hundreds of osteoderms. The length of mature specimens was about 4–4.8 metres (13–16 ft).

== Discovery and naming ==
The species was named by Attila Ősi in 2005. The generic name is derived from Hungary and the Greek sauros, lizard. The specific name honours András Torma, the amateur paleontologist who discovered the fossil site in 2000.

Four specimens of Hungarosaurus tormai are known, all collected from an open-pit bauxite mine near the village of Iharkút, Veszprém County, in the Bakony Mountains (Transdanubian Range) of western Hungary. The quarry exposes the Csehbánya Formation (which overlies the Halimba Formation, also Cretaceous in age), which is a floodplain and channel deposit consisting largely of sandy clays and sandstone beds. The specimen designated as the holotype is MTM Gyn/404 (in the collections of the Magyar Természettudományi Múzeum, Budapest, Hungary) and consists of 450 bones, including portions of the skull (premaxilla, left prefrontal, left lacrimal, right postorbital, jugal and quadratojugal, left frontal, pterygoid, vomer, the right quadrate and a fragment of the left quadrate, basioccipital, one hyoid), an incomplete right mandible, three cervical vertebrae, six dorsal vertebrae, ten caudal vertebrae, ossified tendon fragments, three cerival and thirteen dorsal ribs, five chevrons, the left scapulocoracoid, right scapula, portions of the right manus, a partial pelvis, and more than one hundred osteoderms.

== Description ==
Hungarosaurus was a small nodosaur, measuring 4–4.8 metres (13–16 ft) in length and weighing 650–1,000 kilograms (1,430–2,200 lb). The skull of this dinosaur is ornamented and estimated to have been 32–36 centimetres in length. The forelimbs were unusually long for an ankylosaur, being nearly as long as the hindlimbs.

== Phylogeny ==
Cladistic analysis on the taxon indicates that it is a derived member of the Nodosauridae, along with Struthiosaurus (another European nodosaurid).

The studies show that Hungarosaurus is slightly more advanced than Struthiosaurus, but more primitive than the North American nodosaurids Silvisaurus, Sauropelta and Pawpawsaurus. This was supported by cladistic analysis, which suggests that it is a basal member of the family Nodosauridae.

== Palaeobiology ==
=== Feeding ===
In contrast with earlier hypotheses that H. tormai fed via orthal pulping with little to no occlusion between maxillary and mandibular teeth, dental wear shows that it sheared its food. An slicing phase consisting of an orthal movement came first in the masticatory process; it was followed by a retractive powerstroke during which significant occlusion occurred. Mediolateral translation of the mandibles, axial rotation of them, or a combination of both of these motions contributed to precise shearing along the entire row of teeth.

== Paleoecology ==
The exposure of the Csehbánya Formation that produced Hungarosaurus tormai has also yielded remains of bony fishes, turtles, lizards, crocodiles, and pterosaurs, along with teeth from a diminutive dromaeosaurid-like theropod and a Rhabdodon-like ornithopod.

== See also ==
- Timeline of ankylosaur research
