= Taohelong =

Taohelong Temporal range: Early Cretaceous, 113–110 Ma

Scientific classification
- Kingdom: Animalia
- Phylum: Chordata
- Class: Reptilia
- Clade: Dinosauria
- Clade: †Ornithischia
- Clade: †Thyreophora
- Clade: †Ankylosauria
- Family: †Nodosauridae
- Genus: †Taohelong; Yang et al., 2013

Type species
- †Taohelong jinchengensis Yang et al., 2013

Extinct genus of dinosaurs

Taohelong is a genus of nodosaurid dinosaur known from Early Cretaceous rocks in north-central China. It is based on Gansu Dinosaur Museum (GSDM) 00021, fossils including a tail vertebra, ribs, a left ilium (the main bone of the hip), and bony armor recovered from the Hekou Group in the Lanzhou-Minhe Basin. The animal's armor includes part of a "sacral shield", a carpet of osteoderms over the hips found in some other ankylosaurians. Taohelong was named and described in 2013 by Yang Jing-Tao, You Hai-Lu, Li Da-Qing, and Kong De-Lai. The type species is Taohelong jinchengensis. The generic name means "dragon (long) of the river (he) Tao". The specific name refers to the provenance at Jincheng.

The describers established some diagnostic traits. The neural channel of the tail vertebra has a cross-section like an inverted trapezium. In top view the profile of the outer rim of the ilium is like a mirrored "S". The osteoderms of the sacral shield are irregular in both shape and size. Taohelong was placed in the Nodosauridae, more precisely in the Polacanthinae. Yang et al. performed a phylogenetic analysis and found Taohelong to be the sister taxon to Polacanthus foxii, making it the first polacanthine to be described from Asia.

== Discovery and naming ==
The only known fossil of Taohelong was found in the Lanzhou-Minhe Basin near the border of Yongjing and Lintao counties by the Gansu Zhendan Dinosaur Culture Communication Company. After collection and preparation, it was given to the Gansu Dinosaur Museum as specimen GSDM 00021; preserving a middle caudal vertebra, ribs, a left ilium, and multiple pieces of armor. GSDM 00021 was described in 2013 by paleontologists Yang Jingtao, You Hailu, Li Daqing, and Kong Delai where it was designated the holotype of the new taxon of ankylosaur Taohelong jinchengensis. The genus name is taken from the Tao River that flows through the fossil deposits, while the species name is after the ancient name of Lanzhou, Jincheng, which also translates as "solid" in reference to the armor over the back of the animal.

The deposits Taohelong was found within pertain to the Lower Cretaceous Hekou Group, which can be informally divided into eight subunits in the region. Sediments are red clastic rocks and mudstones dominated by lakebed sediments, with Taohelong itself coming from a thin brown-red mudstone sandwiched between a small amount of grey silty mudstone from an ancient lakeshore. A sauropod, distinct from Huanghetitan and Daxiatitan that are known from elsewhere in the Hekou Group of Lanzhoue-Minhe Basin, was found 200 m (660 ft) away.

== Classification ==
Taohelong was initially regarded as the first member of the ankylosaur group Polacanthinae to have been found in Asia, with Yang and colleagues reconstructing it as the closest relative of Polacanthus from the Barremian of the United Kingdom. United by the angle of the anterior process of the ilium, Taohelong and Polacanthus were also reconstructed as successively more distantly related to Peloroplites, Gastonia burgei, Gargoyleosaurus and Hoplitosaurus, all of which are from the Early Cretaceous or Late Jurassic of North America.
