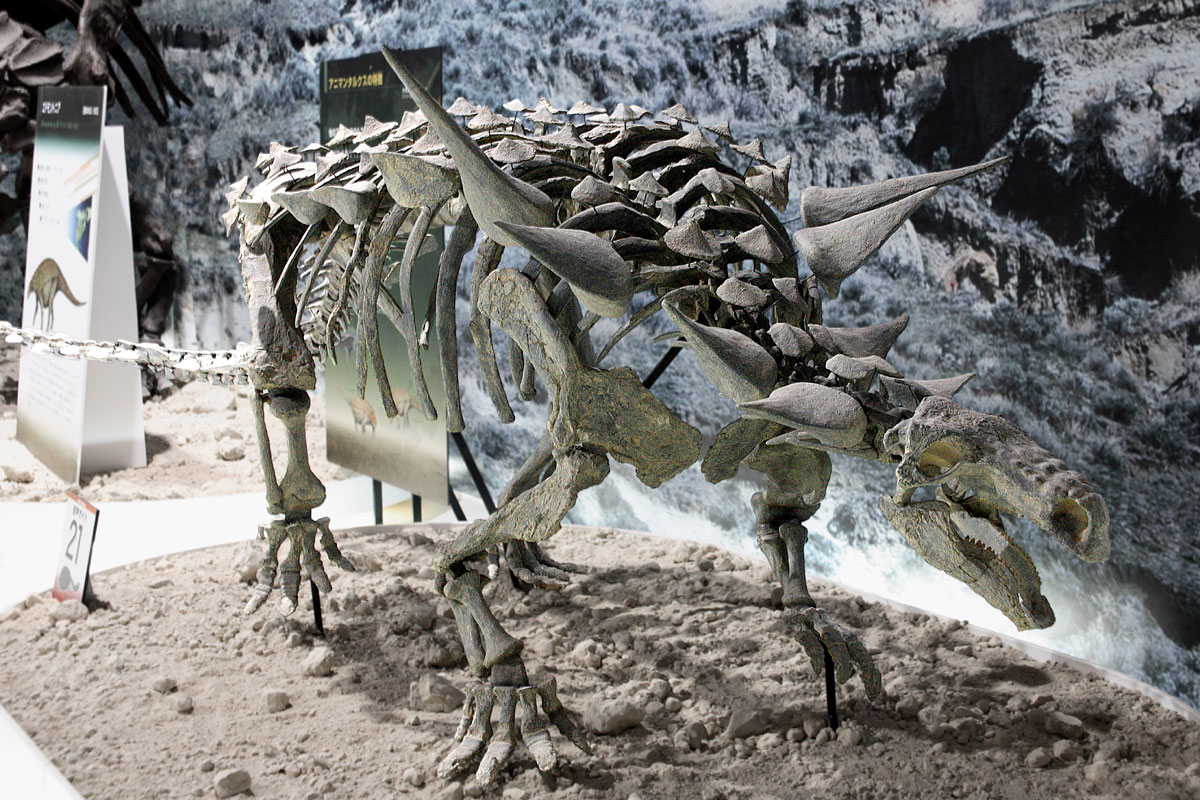
- Reconstructed skeleton

Scientific classification
- Kingdom: Animalia
- Phylum: Chordata
- Class: Reptilia
- Clade: Dinosauria
- Clade: †Ornithischia
- Clade: †Thyreophora
- Clade: †Ankylosauria
- Family: †Nodosauridae
- Subfamily: †Nodosaurinae
- Clade: †Panoplosaurini
- Genus: †Animantarx; Carpenter et al. 1999

Type species
- †Animantarx ramaljonesi Carpenter et al. 1999

= Animantarx =

Animantarx Temporal range: mid Albian-early Cenomanian 104.46–98.37 Ma

Extinct genus of dinosaurs

Animantarx (/ænɪˈmæntɑːrks/ ann-i-MAN-tarks; meaning 'living citadel') is a genus of nodosaurid ankylosaurian dinosaur from the Early and Late Cretaceous of western North America. Like other nodosaurs, it would have been a slow-moving quadrupedal herbivore covered in heavy armor scutes, but without a tail club. The skull measures approximately 25 cm (10 inches) in length, suggesting the animal as a whole was no more than 3 meters (10 feet) long.

== Discovery and species ==
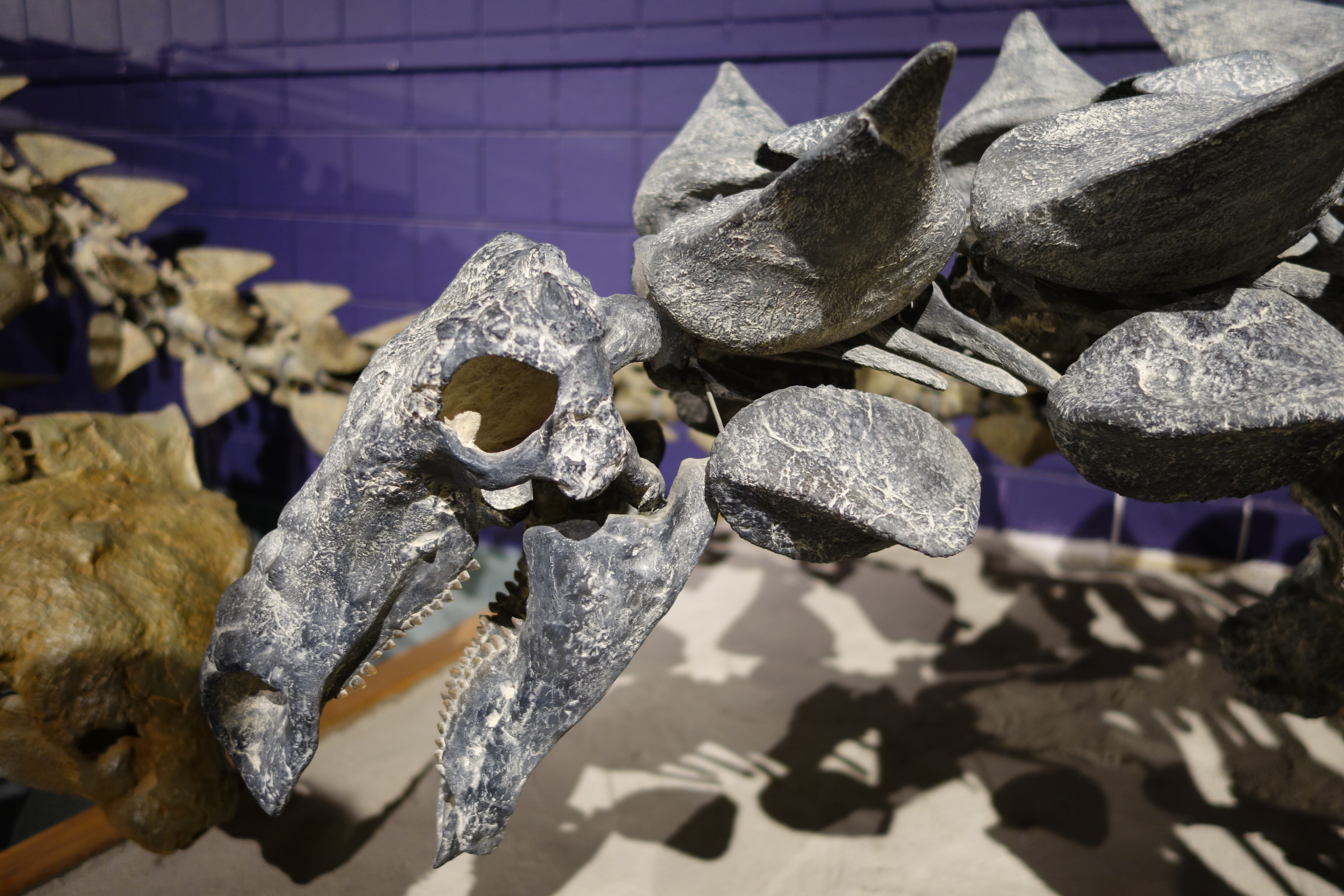
Detail of skull and neck. Reconstructed skeleton at the USU Eastern Prehistoric Museum, Price, Utah

The generic name is composed of the Latin words animatus ("living" or "animated") and arx ("fortress" or "citadel"), referring to its armored nature. In particular, the name is a reference to a comment made by paleontologist R. S. Lull about ankylosaurs, that as "an animated citadel, these animals must have been practically unassailable..." The type species is the only one known so far, and is called A. ramaljonesi after its discoverer, Ramal Jones. His wife, Carol Jones, also discovered the contemporaneous dinosaur Eolambia nearby.

Only one specimen of Animantarx has so far been recovered. The remains include the lower jaw and back half of the skull, along with neck and back vertebrae, and various limb elements. Animantarx is characterized by a unique combination of features, including a highly domed skull back, small horns on the postorbital and quadratojugal bones of the skull, and a mandible which is only armoured on half of its length.

Fossils in this region are often slightly radioactive, and remains of Animantarx were actually discovered following a radiological survey of the area performed by Ramal Jones, which located a higher level of radioactivity at a certain location. Subsequent excavation at this site turned up the fossil skeleton of Animantarx; no bones had been exposed on the surface.

== Classification ==
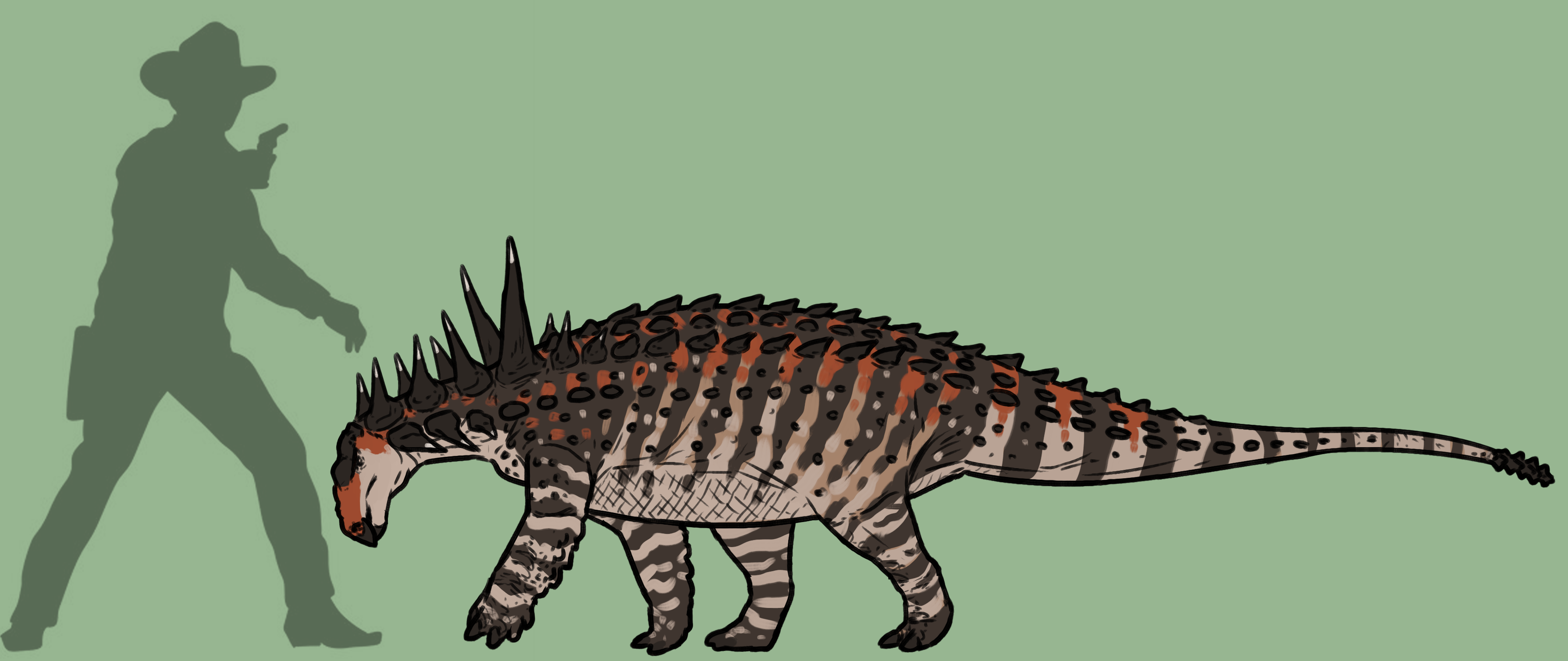
Size comparison with life restoration

Animantarx is universally thought of as a nodosaurid ankylosaur, although its precise relationships within that family are uncertain. The most recent cladistic analysis of ankylosaur phylogeny does not include Animantarx, although the authors recognize the genus as Nodosauridae incertae sedis because of its rounded supraorbital protrusions and a "knoblike" acromion on the scapula. Two separate studies have found Animantarx to be the sister taxon of Edmontonia within Nodosauridae.

The cladogram below follows the 2018 phylogenetic analysis of Rivera-Sylva and colleagues, limited to the relationships within Panoplosaurini.

- Panoplosaurini
  - Animantarx
  - - Panoplosaurus
    - - Patagopelta
      - Texasetes
      - Denversaurus
      - Edmontonia longiceps
      - Edmontonia rugosidens

== Paleoenvironment ==
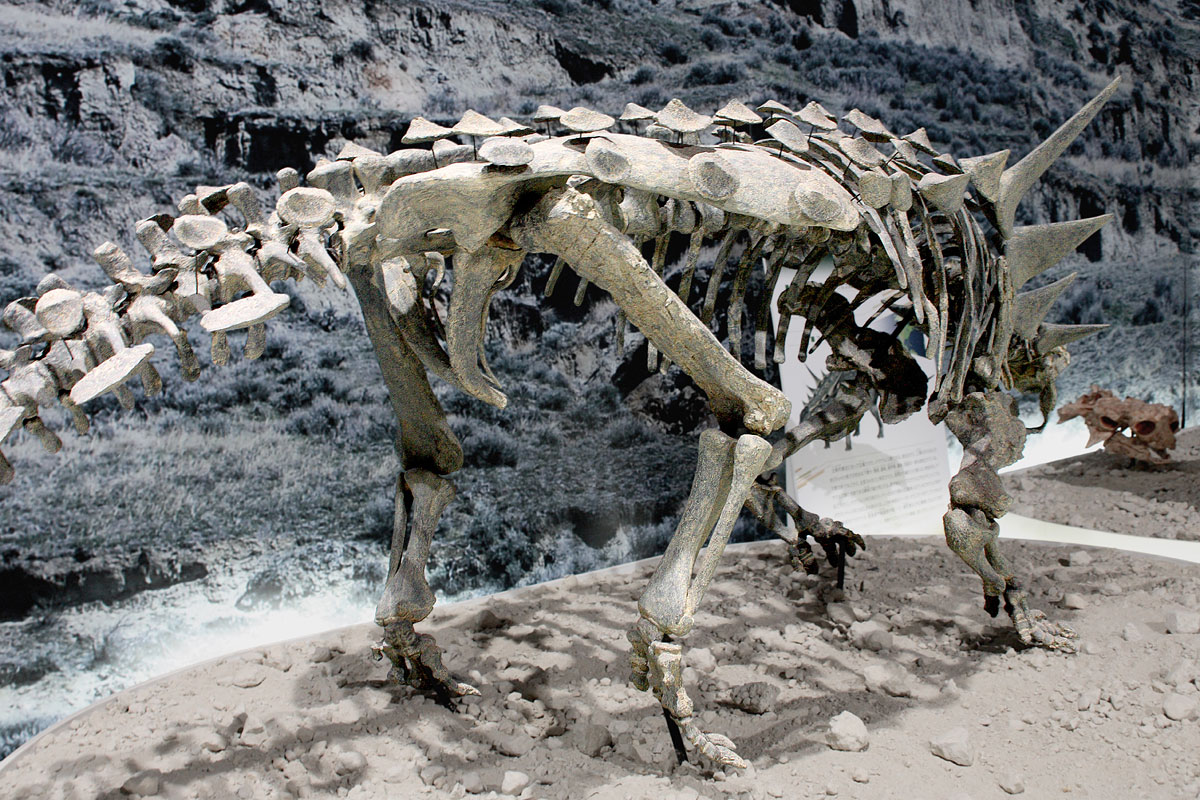
Other angle of skeleton

These fossil remains were discovered in the Mussentuchit Member of the Cedar Mountain Formation in the eastern portion of the U.S. state of Utah. This section of the formation is believed to represent the late Albian through early Cenomanian stages of the Late Cretaceous Period, or about 106 to 97 million years ago. At least 80 other vertebrate species are known from the Mussentuchit, including fish, frogs, lizards, snakes, crocodilians, dinosaurs, birds, and mammals, although not all are complete enough to name. Many dinosaur groups are represented by fossils from this member, including carnivorous theropods as well as several different herbivorous types, including the iguanodont Eolambia. The presence of aquatic animals like fish and frogs, as well as the mudstone in which their fossils are found, suggests that this was a floodplain environment.

Earlier layers within the Cedar Mountain Formation contain different nodosaur species. The oldest layer, known as the Yellow Cat Member, contains Gastonia burgei, the intermediate Poison Strip Member contains remains which may belong to Sauropelta, and the younger Ruby Ranch Member contains remains of a second species of Gastonia, G. lorriemcwhinneyae. The Mussentuchit Member, which is the youngest member of the Cedar Mountain, contains Animantarx and Peloroplites. While there is still a lot of exploration left to be done, this division of nodosaur species corresponds with that of other dinosaur groups and provides support for the hypothesis of three separate faunas in the Cedar Mountain Formation. The Mussentuchit fauna includes many taxa which may be of Asian origin and suggests a dispersal event may have occurred from Asia into North America around this time.

== See also ==
- Timeline of ankylosaur research
