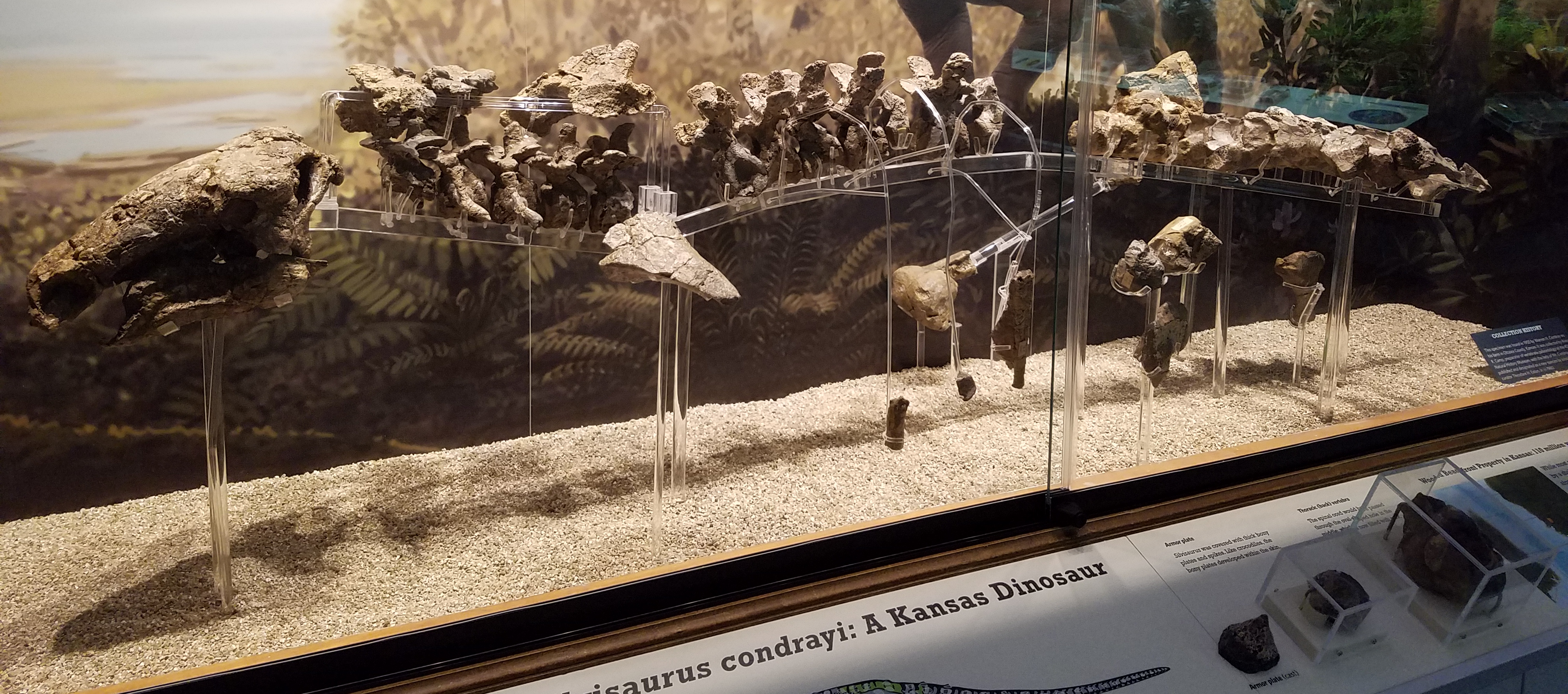
- Holotype skeleton on display at the University of Kansas Natural History Museum in Lawrence, Kansas

Scientific classification
- Kingdom: Animalia
- Phylum: Chordata
- Class: Reptilia
- Clade: Dinosauria
- Clade: †Ornithischia
- Clade: †Thyreophora
- Clade: †Ankylosauria
- Family: †Nodosauridae
- Subfamily: †Nodosaurinae
- Genus: †Silvisaurus; Eaton, 1960
- Species: †S. condrayi

Binomial name
- †Silvisaurus condrayi Eaton, 1960

= Silvisaurus =

Silvisaurus Temporal range: Early-Late Cretaceous, 104–93.5 Ma

Extinct species of reptile

Silvisaurus, from the Latin silva "woodland" and Greek sauros "lizard", is a nodosaurid ankylosaur from the Early to Late Cretaceous period. It is the only known dinosaur species named from terrestrial deposits in Kansas and was designated the official state land fossil in 2023.

== Discovery and species ==
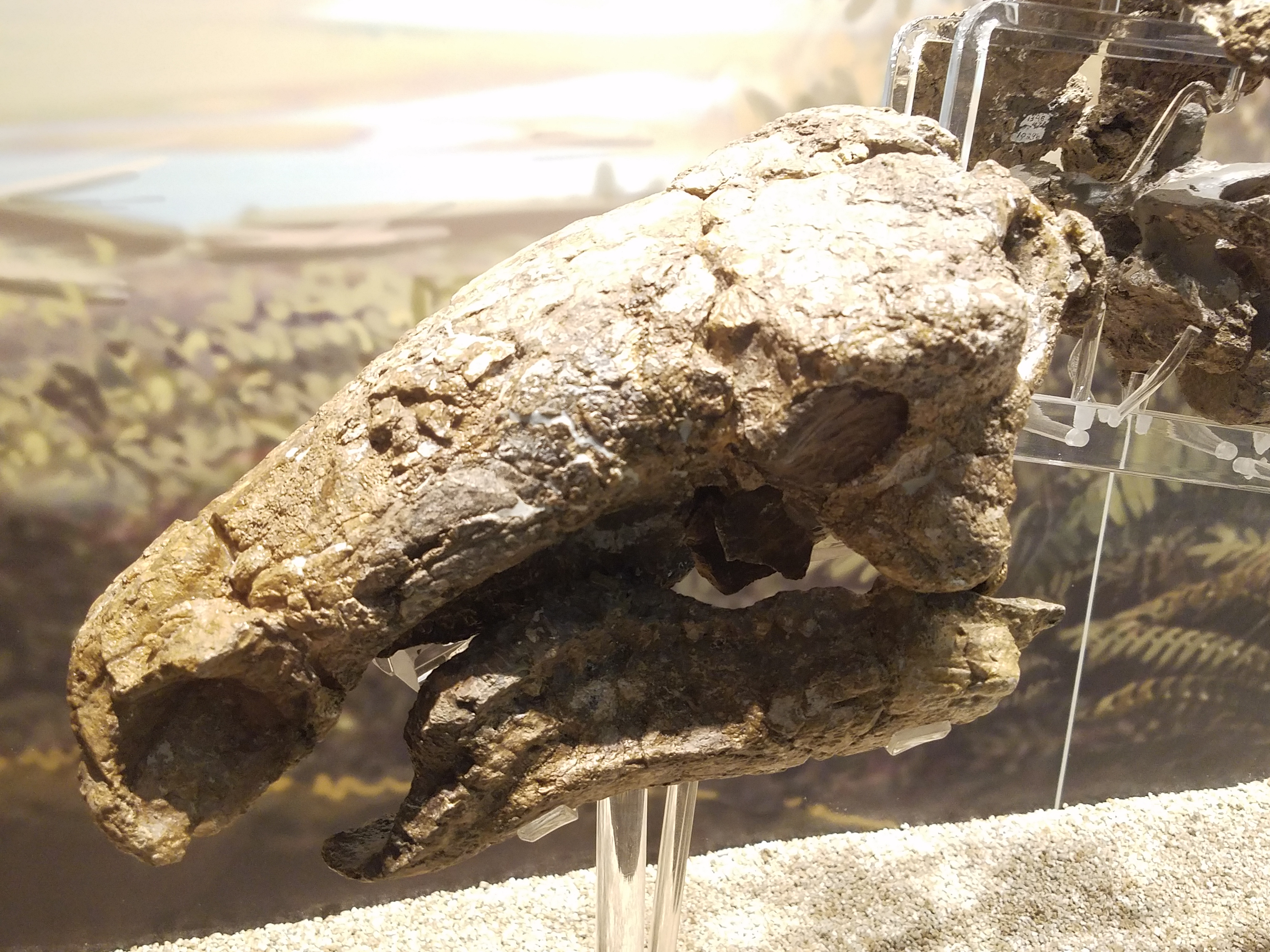
Skull

A fossil of the species was discovered in the 1950s by rancher Warren W. Condray of Wells, Kansas. He notified senator Frank Carlson who directed him to the chancellor of the University of Kansas, Franklin David Murphy. Murphy sent the preparator of the paleontology of vertebrates department of the natural history museum of the university, Russell R. Camp, to investigate the matter. In July 1955 Camp, with help from Condray, recovered the skeleton of a dinosaur. It was further prepared by Camp and Glenn H. Marihugh. In 1960 the find was described and named by Theodore H. Eaton Jr., also from the University of Kansas, as the type species Silvisaurus condrayi. The generic name is derived from Latin silva, "wood", in reference to the probably densely forested habitat of the animal. The specific name honours Condray. To date, Silvisaurus includes only the type species.

The holotype, KU 10296, was found in exposures of the Terra Cotta Clay Member of the Dakota Formation (late Albian-early Cenomanian) in Kansas, and consists of an incomplete skeleton with skull. It includes the mandible, eight neck vertebrae, ten dorsal vertebrae, a sacrum of six sacral vertebrae, three tail vertebrae, a left pubis fragment, the lower end of the right femur, and a toe phalanx. Additionally disarticulated plates and spikes from the body armour were discovered. The condition of the fossil was poor as the bones had been exposed at the bottom of a dry riverbed and had been weathered and trampled by cattle. Some elements were only present as impressions or natural casts.

== Description ==
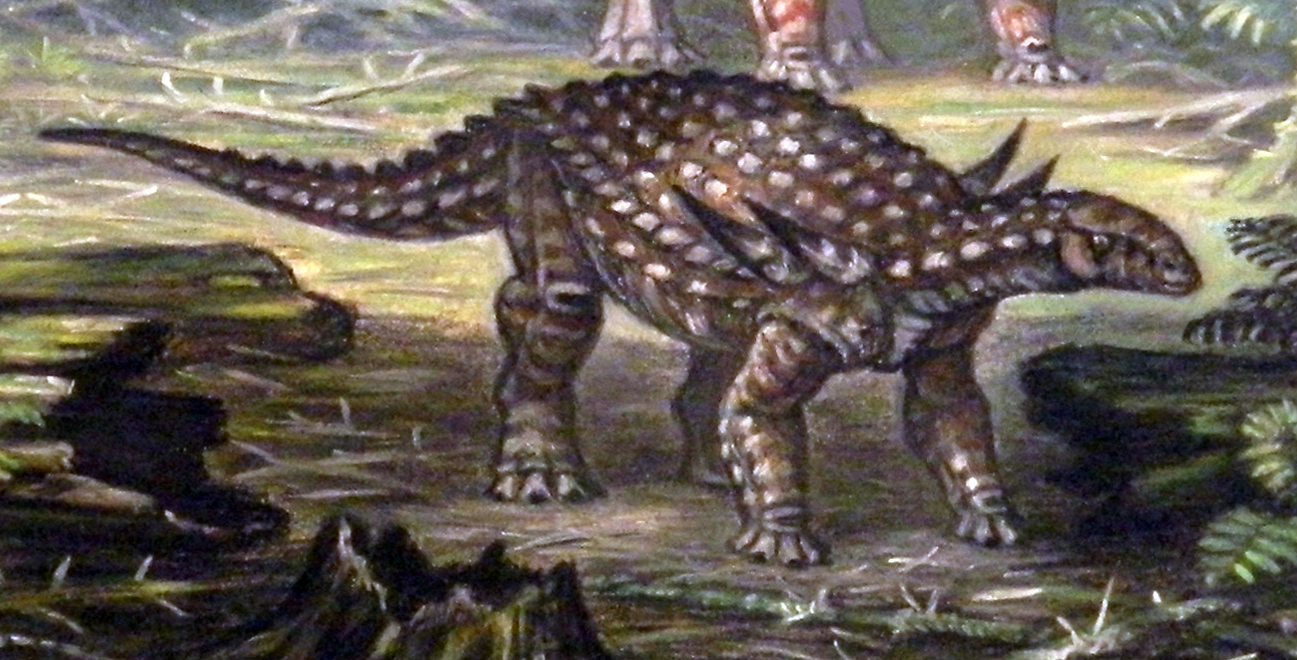
Restoration

Based on the remains, the animal is estimated to have been approximately 4 metres (13 ft) in length. Its skull measures 33 centimetres (13 in) in length and is 25 centimetres (9.8 in) wide. The bony secondary palate is poorly developed in Silvisaurus, the dentary includes at least twenty-five teeth, the basal tubera of the basioccipital are bulbous, and each premaxilla holds eight to nine teeth.

The presence of teeth at the front of the jaw suggests that this may have been a relatively primitive nodosaur, since most later forms had a toothless beak instead. In addition to the usual rounded and polygonal osteoderms, Silvisaurus may have also sported bony spines on its shoulders and tail. The head contained large air passages, which may have been used for loud vocalisations, presumably for communication.

== Classification ==
This taxon represents a relatively primitive nodosaurid, and Vickaryous et al. (2004) have stated that "Sauropelta edwardsorum, Silvisaurus condrayi, and Pawpawsaurus campbelli form a basal polytomy nested deep to Cedarpelta."

== See also ==
- Timeline of ankylosaur research
