= Tatankacephalus =

Tatankacephalus Temporal range: Early Cretaceous, 108.5 Ma

Scientific classification
- Kingdom: Animalia
- Phylum: Chordata
- Class: Reptilia
- Clade: Dinosauria
- Clade: †Ornithischia
- Clade: †Thyreophora
- Clade: †Ankylosauria
- Family: †Nodosauridae
- Subfamily: †Nodosaurinae
- Genus: †Tatankacephalus; Parsons & Parsons, 2009
- Species: †T. cooneyorum

Binomial name
- †Tatankacephalus cooneyorum Parsons & Parsons, 2009

Extinct genus of dinosaurs

Tatankacephalus is a basal genus of nodosaurid dinosaur that lived during the Early Cretaceous. Its length has been estimated at 7 meters (23 ft).

Its fossil has been collected from the Cloverly Formation (Aptian-Albian) of central Montana, USA, during 1996, 1997 and 1998, in the region of the Middle Dome in Wheatland County. The type species is T. cooneyorum, described by William L. Parsons and Kristen Parsons in 2009. The genus name is derived from Oglala tatanka, "bison" and Greek kephale, "head", in reference to the rounded head form. The specific name honours the family of John Patrick Cooney. The holotype is MOR 1073, a partial skull with an estimated total undamaged length of 32 centimetres, lacking the lower jaws. Also some ribs, osteoderms and a tooth have been recovered. The front of the snout is missing. The specimen is that of an adult individual.

According to the authors the fossil has not been deformed by compression, allowing to distinguish it from Sauropelta edwardsorum, another ankylosaurian found in the same formation. The head is domed and the eye-sockets are round. A large bone ridge runs transversely across the back of the head. The fossil skull itself no longer had any teeth in it but a single tooth was found, lacking the cingulum. Two osteoderms were found; one was intact. It has a length of 137 and a width of 115 millimetres. It is hollow and conical.

A cladistic analysis found that Tatankacephalus was a basal member of the Ankylosauridae and relatively closely related to Gastonia. Basal traits include the retention of premaxillary teeth in the front of the upper jaws and a skull opening, the lateral temporal fenestra, that was not covered by the skull armour. A new cladistic analysis performed by Thompson et al., 2011 suggests that Tatankacephalus is a basal nodosaurid.

== See also ==
- Timeline of ankylosaur research
