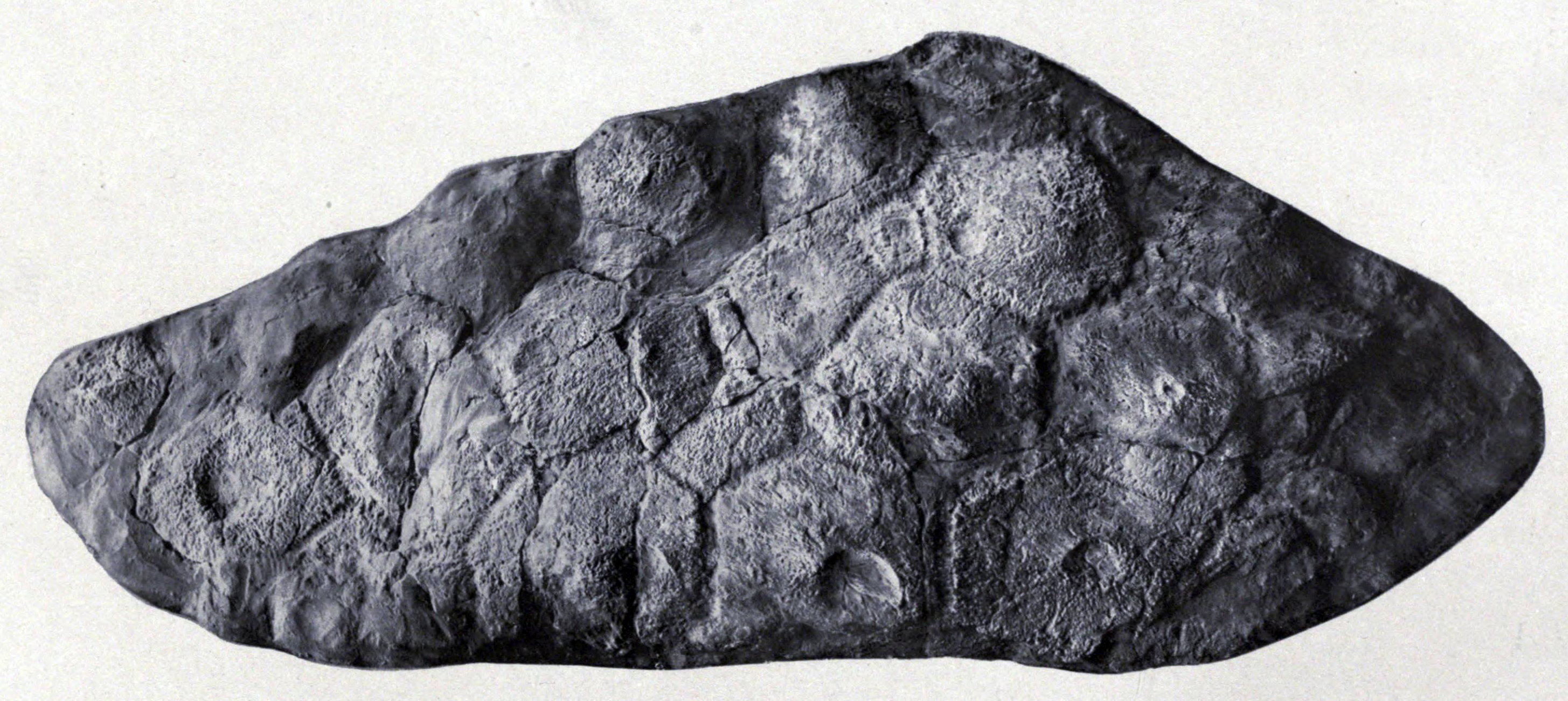
- Pelvic armor

Scientific classification
- Kingdom: Animalia
- Phylum: Chordata
- Class: Reptilia
- Clade: Dinosauria
- Clade: †Ornithischia
- Clade: †Thyreophora
- Clade: †Ankylosauria
- Family: †Nodosauridae
- Subfamily: †Nodosaurinae
- Clade: †Struthiosaurini
- Genus: †Stegopelta; Williston, 1905
- Species: †S. landerensis

Binomial name
- †Stegopelta landerensis Williston, 1905

= Stegopelta =

Stegopelta Temporal range: Early-Late Cretaceous, 104.5–97 Ma

Extinct genus of dinosaurs

Stegopelta (meaning "roofed shield") is a genus of struthiosaurin nodosaurid dinosaur based on a partial skeleton from the Cretaceous (latest Albian-earliest Cenomanian) Belle Fourche Member of the Frontier Formation of Fremont County, Wyoming, USA.

== History ==
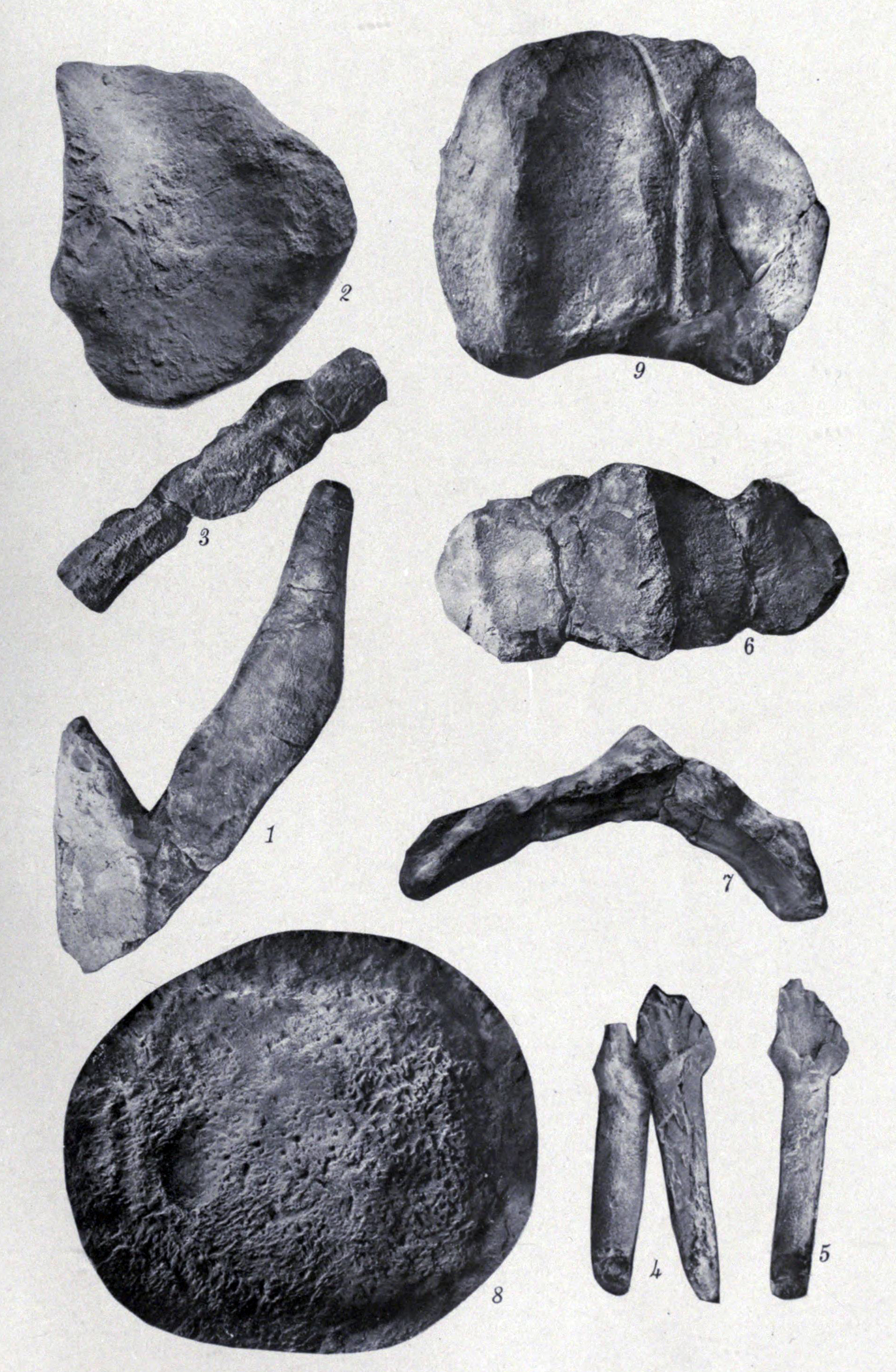
Armor plates and teeth

In 1905, Samuel Wendell Williston described FMNH UR88, a partial armored dinosaur skeleton consisting of a maxilla fragment, seven cervical and two dorsal vertebrae, part of a sacrum and both ilia, caudal vertebrae, parts of the scapulae, both humeral heads, portions of an ulna and both radii, a metacarpal, partial tibia, metatarsal, and armor including a shoulder spine and neck ring. The specimen was in poor condition, as it had eroded from a slope and been walked on by cattle. Ankylosaurians being very poorly known, Williston compared his new genus to Stegosaurus, and the armor to that of Glyptodon. Like that mammal, Stegopelta had a fused section of armor (in its case over the pelvis). Roy Lee Moodie redescribed it in 1910, and considered it to be close to, if not the same as, Ankylosaurus.

The genus fell into obscurity. Walter Coombs synonymized it with the more famous but equally poorly known Nodosaurus in his 1978 redescription of the Ankylosauria. It was reinstated as a valid genus by Ken Carpenter and James Kirkland (1998), who recognized it as having distinct vertebral and armor characteristics. Tracy Ford took this further in 2000, assigning it to a new subfamily in Ankylosauridae based on armor characteristics, which he called Stegopeltinae. Also included was Glyptodontopelta. This has not been generally accepted, but most recent reviews have accepted Stegopelta as a distinct genus with uncertain affinities.

== Paleobiology ==
Since it is extremely unknown, at this point all there is to be said about the habits and life of Stegopelta is that it was a slow quadrupedal herbivore which fed low to the ground and relied on its armor for defense.

Its armor included a fused region over the sacrum, and shoulder spines that may have been split, as seen in Edmontonia.

== See also ==
- Timeline of ankylosaur research
