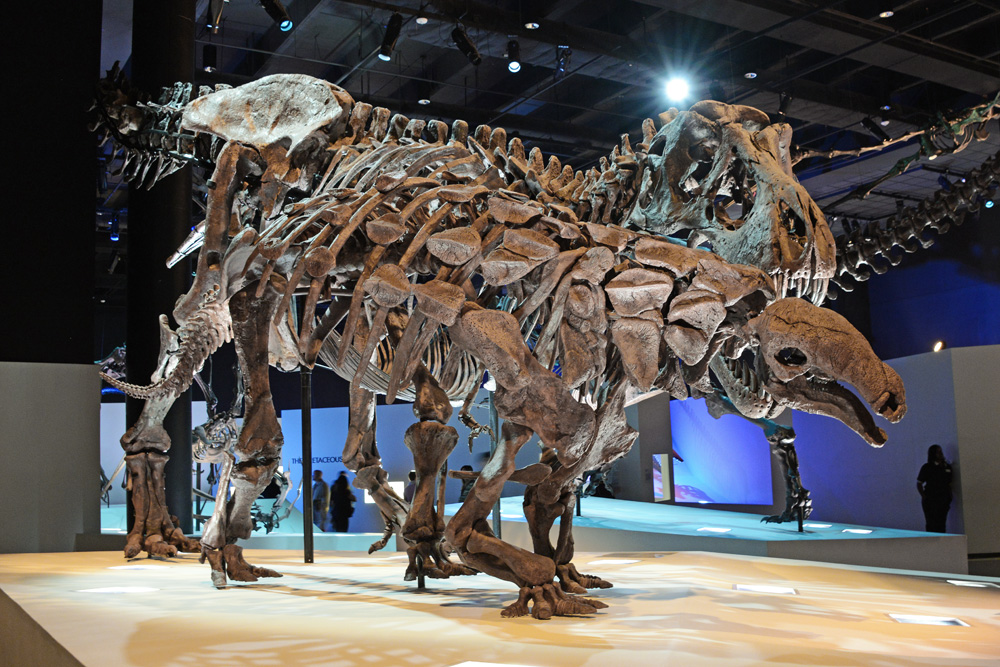
- Skeleton cast of Denversaurus ("Tank"), Houston Museum of Natural Science

Scientific classification
- Kingdom: Animalia
- Phylum: Chordata
- Class: Reptilia
- Clade: Dinosauria
- Clade: †Ornithischia
- Clade: †Thyreophora
- Clade: †Ankylosauria
- Family: †Nodosauridae
- Subfamily: †Nodosaurinae
- Clade: †Panoplosaurini
- Genus: †Denversaurus; Bakker, 1988

Type species
- †Denversaurus schlessmani Bakker, 1988

Synonyms
- Edmontonia schlessmani (Bakker, 1988)

= Denversaurus =

Denversaurus Temporal range: Late Cretaceous, 68–66 Ma

Extinct genus of dinosaurs

Denversaurus (meaning "Denver lizard") is a genus of panoplosaurin nodosaurid dinosaur from the late Maastrichtian of Late Cretaceous Western North America. Although at one point treated as a junior synonym of Edmontonia by some taxonomists, current research indicates that it is its own distinct nodosaurid genus.

== Discovery and naming ==
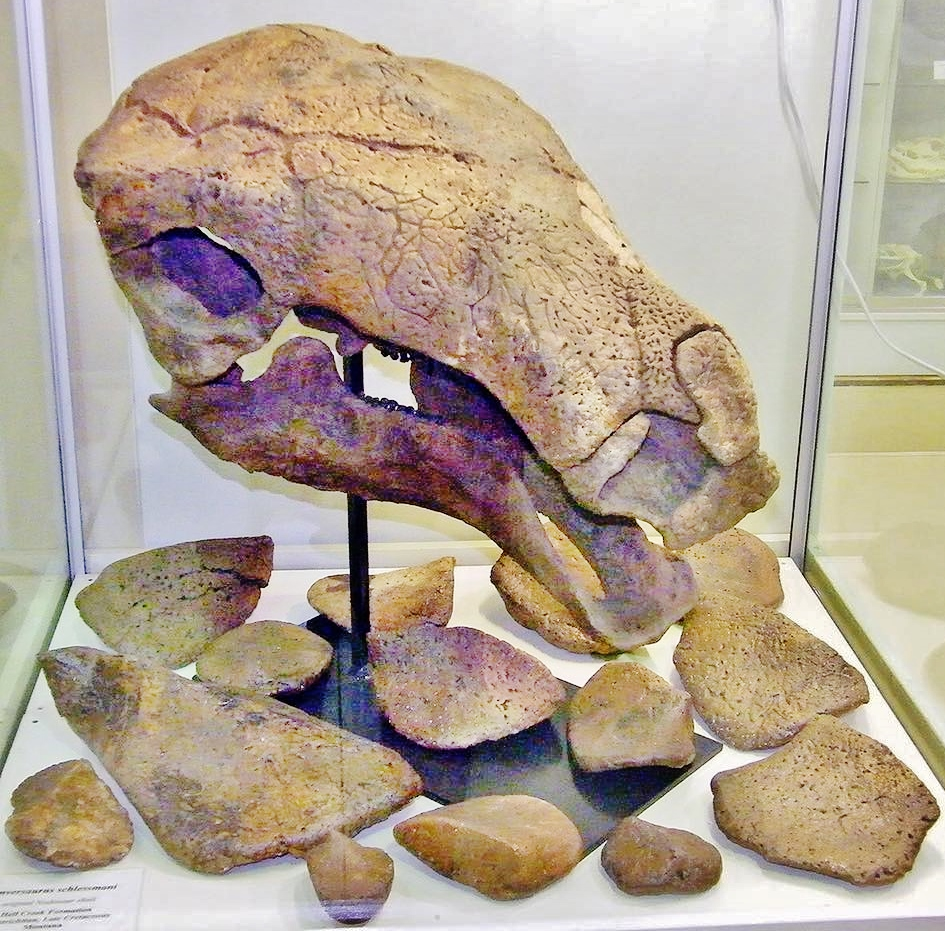
Original skull and osteoderms on Display at Black Hills Institute of Geological Research

In 1922, Philip Reinheimer, a collector and technician employed by the Colorado Museum of Natural History, the predecessor of the present Denver Museum of Nature and Science, near the Twito Ranch in Corson County, South Dakota discovered the fossil of an ankylosaurian in a Maastrichtian age terrestrial horizon. In 1943, Barnum Brown referred the find to Edmontonia longiceps in an unpublished manuscript.

In 1986, the paleontologists Kenneth Carpenter and Brent Breithaupt described this DMNH 468 as a specimen of a late Maastrichtian nodosaurid, tentatively assigned to Edmontonia sp., discovered from the lower Hell Creek Formation of South Dakota.

In 1988, Robert Thomas Bakker decided to split the genus Edmontonia. The species Edmontonia rugosidens was made into a separate genus named Chassternbergia and DMNH 468 was designated as a holotype of a new genus and species. The type species of this genus was Denversaurus schlessmani. The generic name referred to the Denver Museum of Natural History at Denver, Colorado. The specific name honoured Lee E. Schlessman, a major benefactor of the museum and the founder of the Schlessman Family Foundation.

The holotype consists of a skull without the lower jaws and a number of osteoderms of the body armour. It is part of the collection of the Denver Museum of Nature and Science after which the genus was named. Bakker referred a second fossil to the species, specimen AMNH 3076, a skull found by Brown and American Museum of Natural History paleontologist Roland T. Bird at the Tornillo Creek in Brewster County, Texas, in a layer of the poorly dated Upper Cretaceous Aguja Formation, possibly from the Maastrichtian too. However, subsequent studies reassigned AMNH 3076 to Edmontonia, probably E. longiceps.

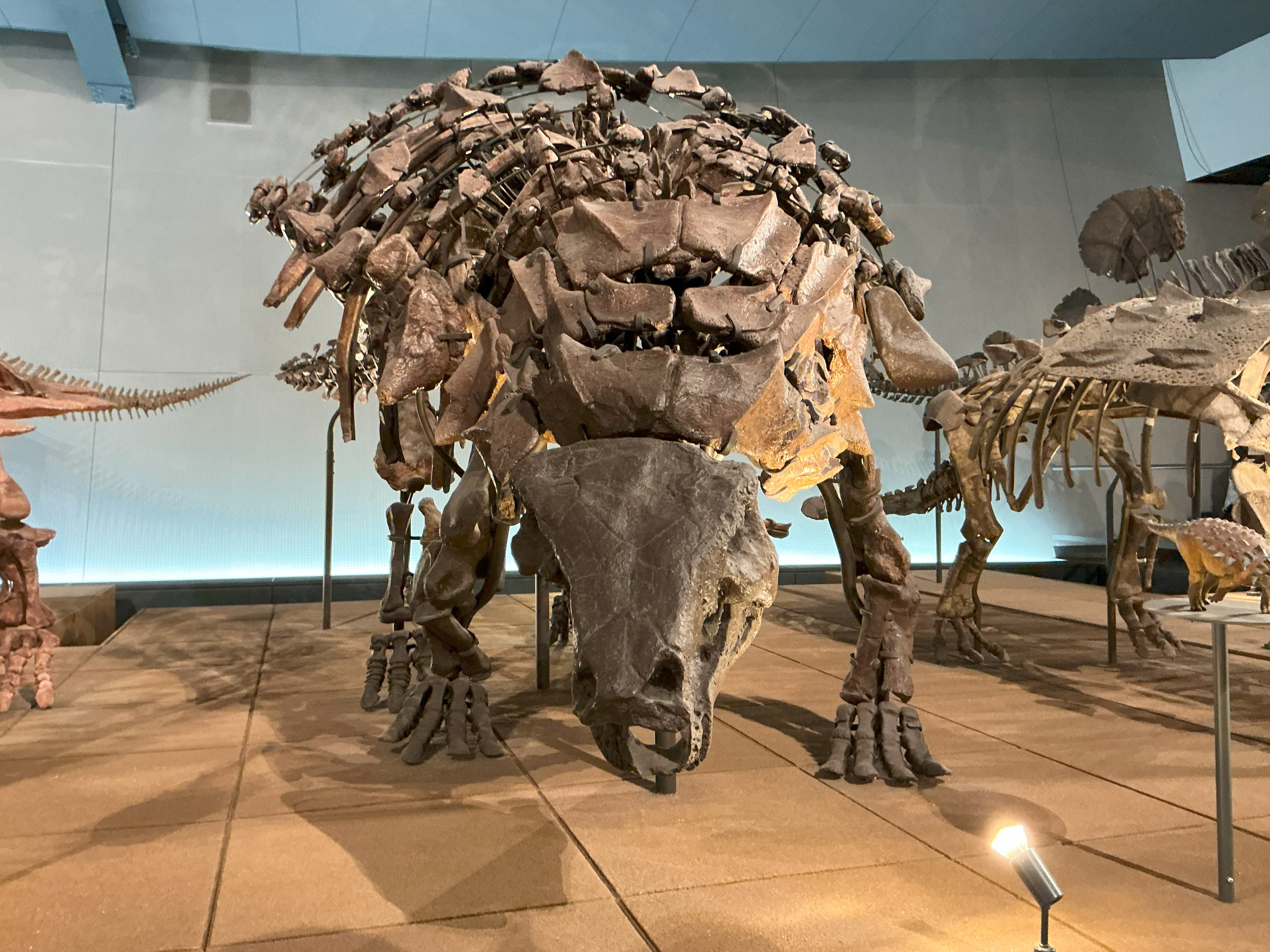
Skeletal mount of FPDM-V9673 ("Tank"), Fukui Prefectural Dinosaur Museum

The validity of Denversaurus was disputed in a 1990 paper on ankylosaurian systematics by Kenneth Carpenter, who noted that Bakker's diagnosis of Denversaurus was based primarily on Bakker's artistic restoration of the holotype in an uncrushed state. Since DMNH 468 was found crushed, Carpenter assigned Denversaurus back to Edmontonia sp., even though he noted its similarity to Edmontonia rugosidens. A number of workers treated Denversaurus as synonymous with either E. rugosidens or E. longiceps, or alternatively as a valid species of Edmontonia: E. schlessmani.

In 1988, fossil hunters found a partial nodosaurid skeleton consisting of the fragmentary skull, parts of postcranial skeleton and seventy-five osteoderms from the Lance Formation of Niobrara County, Wyoming, nicknamed "Tank", which has been tentatively assigned to as Edmontonia sp. in 1994. It was part of the collection of the Rocky Mountain Dinosaur Resource Center under inventory number BHI 127327, referred to as Edmontonia schlessmani by Carpenter et al. (2013), and is now under the inventory number FPDM-V9673.

In the 2015 thesis, Michael Burns revisited the systematics of latest Cretaceous nodosaurids from the Western Interior. According to Burns, Denversaurus is likely a valid taxon based on its phylogenetic position. Recent phylogenetic analyses included Denversaurus as a valid genus closely related to Edmontonia.

== Description ==
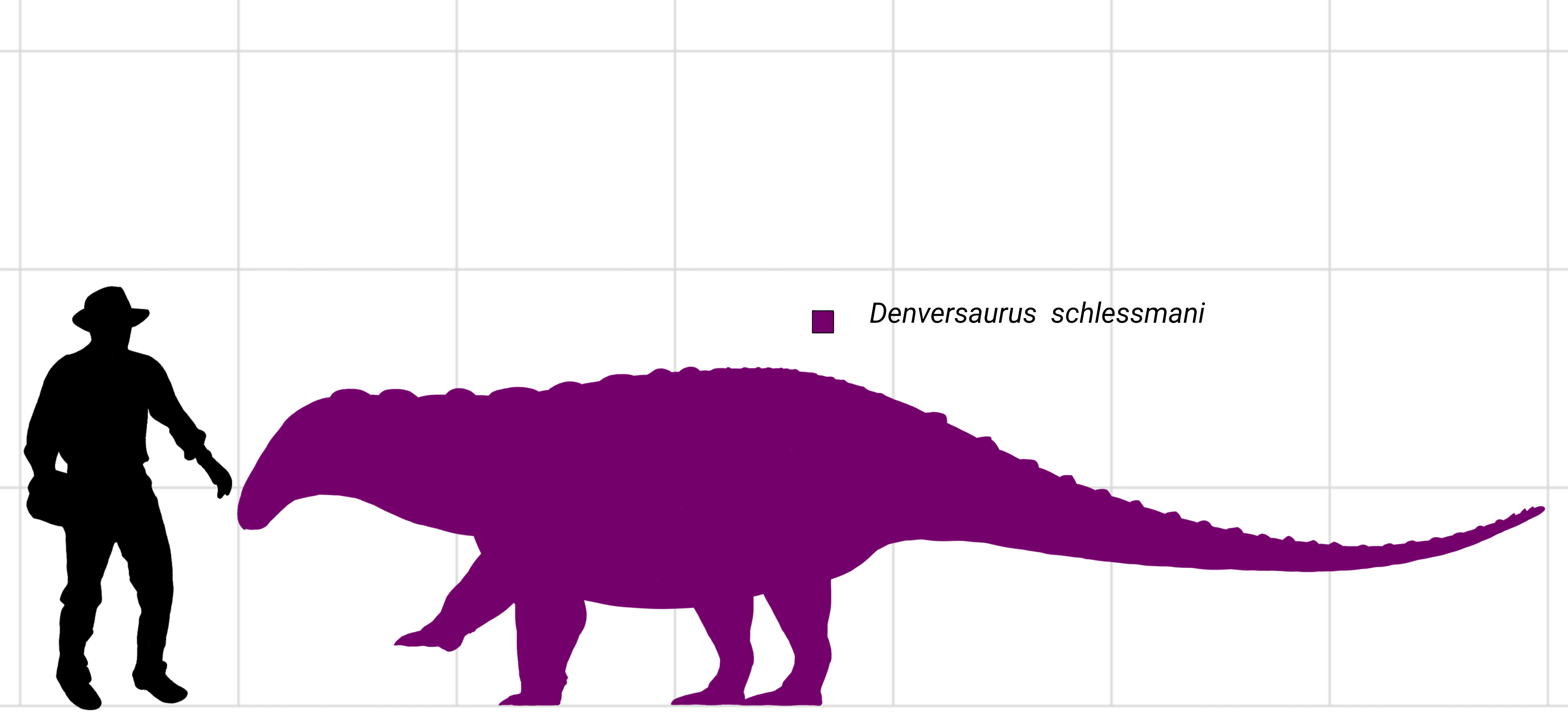
Size comparison

In 2010, American paleontologist Gregory S. Paul estimated the length of Denversaurus at 6 metres (20 ft) and its body mass at 3 tonnes (3.3 short tons).

Robert T. Bakker considered Denversaurus distinct from Edmontonia and Chassternbergia in having a skull that was wide at the rear and a more rearward position of the eye sockets. The holotype skull has a length of 496 millimetres and a rear width of 346 millimetres. In the referred specimen AMNH 3076, these proportions are less extreme, measuring 395 millimetres long with a rear width of 220 millimetres. According to American paleontologist Kenneth Carpenter, the greater width of both the holotype and the referred specimen was due to crushing.

In 2015, vertebrate anatomist and paleontologist Michael Burns published an abstract concluding that Denversaurus was different from Edmontonia, but similar to Panoplosaurus in having inflated, convex, cranial sculpturing with visible sulci, or troughs, between individual top skull armour elements, but is distinct from Panoplosaurus in having a relatively wider snout.

== Classification ==
In 1988, Bakker placed Denversaurus within Edmontoniidae, the presumed sister group of Nodosauridae within Nodosauroidea that would not have been Ankylosauria, but the last surviving Stegosauria. However, these hypotheses have not been confirmed by modern cladistic analysis. Whether it presents a separate species or is identical to E. rugosidens or E. longiceps, Denversaurus material is considered nodosaurid and ankylosaurian. Paul suggested that it was the direct descendant of E. longiceps. Burns recovered Denversaurus as the sister species of Panoplosaurus.
