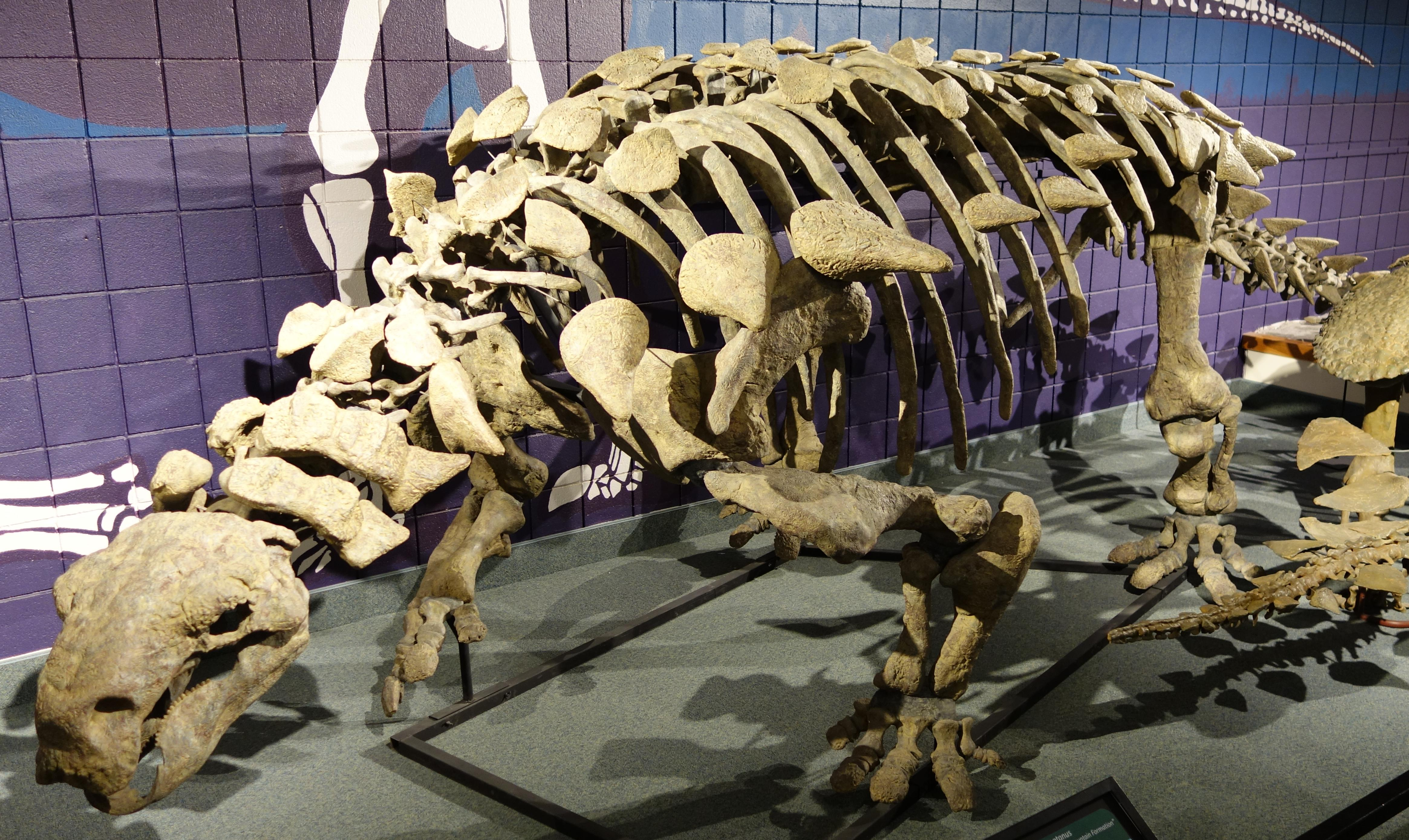
- Peloroplites skeletal reconstruction on display at the USU Eastern Prehistoric Museum, Price, Utah

Scientific classification
- Kingdom: Animalia
- Phylum: Chordata
- Class: Reptilia
- Clade: Dinosauria
- Clade: †Ornithischia
- Clade: †Thyreophora
- Clade: †Ankylosauria
- Family: †Nodosauridae
- Subfamily: †Polacanthinae
- Genus: †Peloroplites; Carpenter et al., 2008
- Species: †P. cedrimontanus

Binomial name
- †Peloroplites cedrimontanus Carpenter et al., 2008

= Peloroplites =

Peloroplites Temporal range: Late Cretaceous, 98.2–93 Ma

Extinct genus of ankylosaurian dinosaurs

Peloroplites (meaning "monstrous heavy one") is a monospecific genus of nodosaurid dinosaur from Utah that lived during the Late Cretaceous (Cenomanian to lower Turonian stage, 98.2 to 93 Ma) in what is now the Mussentuchit Member of the Cedar Mountain Formation. The type and only species, Peloroplites cedrimontanus, is known from a partial skull and postcranial skeleton. It was named in 2008 by Kenneth Carpenter and colleagues. Peloroplites was 6 metres (20 feet) long and weighed 2 tonnes (4,410 lbs), making it one of the largest known nodosaurids, and came from a time when ankylosaurids and nodosaurids were attaining large sizes.

== Discovery and Naming ==
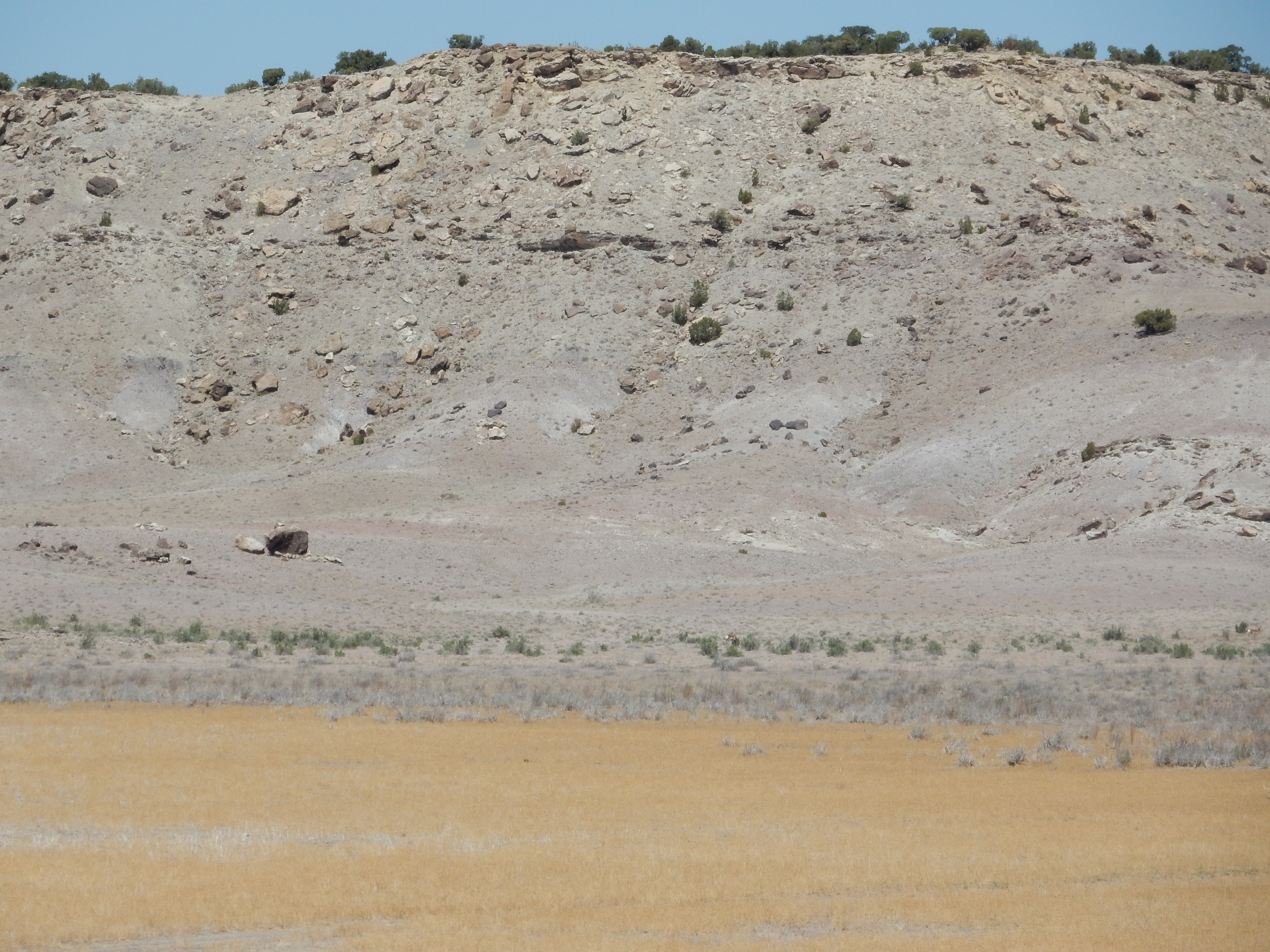
Outcrops of the Cedar Mountain Formation in Utah

In 2001, a skeleton of a large nodosaurid from the Cedar Mountain Formation in Emery County, Utah was mentioned by Burge and Bird in a publication about the faunal composition of the Price River II quarry. More material was obtained and was subsequently described in 2008 by Kenneth Carpenter, Jeff Bartlett, John Bird and Reese Barrick. The Price River II quarry was previously reported as occurring in the Ruby Ranch Member by Burge and Bird (2001) but was later reported as occurring in the base of the Mussentuchit Member due to the dark, carbonaceous nature of mudstones of the strata. The Price River II quarry has also produced specimens pertaining to four individuals of a new brachiosaurid, an iguanodontid, associated cranial and postcranial material of Cedarpelta, a turtle and a pterosaur. The holotype specimen, CEUM 26331, consists of a partial skull. Additional specimens were assigned to Peloroplites that consist of cervical vertebrae, dorsal vertebrae, synsacrums, caudal vertebrae, chevron, scapula-coracoids, humeri, radii, ulnae, ilia, pubis, ischium, femora, tibiae, fibulae, metacarpals, metatarsal, metapodials, phalanges, unguals, osteoderms and various bone fragments. The holotype and assigned specimens are currently housed at the College of Eastern Utah, Prehistoric Museum, Utah.

The generic name, Peloroplites, is derived from the Greek words "peloros" (monstrous, gigantic) and "hoplites" (heavily armed), and as a subjunctive, a heavily armed soldier. The specific name, cedrimontanus, is derived from the Latin words "cedrus" (Cedar) and "mont-" (mountain), in reference to the Cedar Mountain Formation.

Carpenter et al. (2008) suggested that some of the large nodosaurid material from the Ruby Ranch Member of the Cedar Mountain Formation that has been questionably identified as Sauropelta may actually belong to Peloroplites. If the material does belong to Peloroplites, then it would extend the stratigraphic range based on a specimen described by Warren and Carpenter (2004). However, one specimen tentatively referred to Sauropelta cannot be assigned to either that genus or to Peloroplites. The specimen was obtained from the Poison Strip Sandstone Member of the Cedar Mountain Formation and assigned to Hoplitosaurus by Bodily (1969) based on the morphology of the spines. The compressed, triangular spines of the specimen are characteristic of polacanthines, which also includes Hoplitosaurus. Carpenter et al. (2008) considered that the specimen probably represents an unnamed large polacanthine.

== Description ==
=== Size and distinguishing traits ===
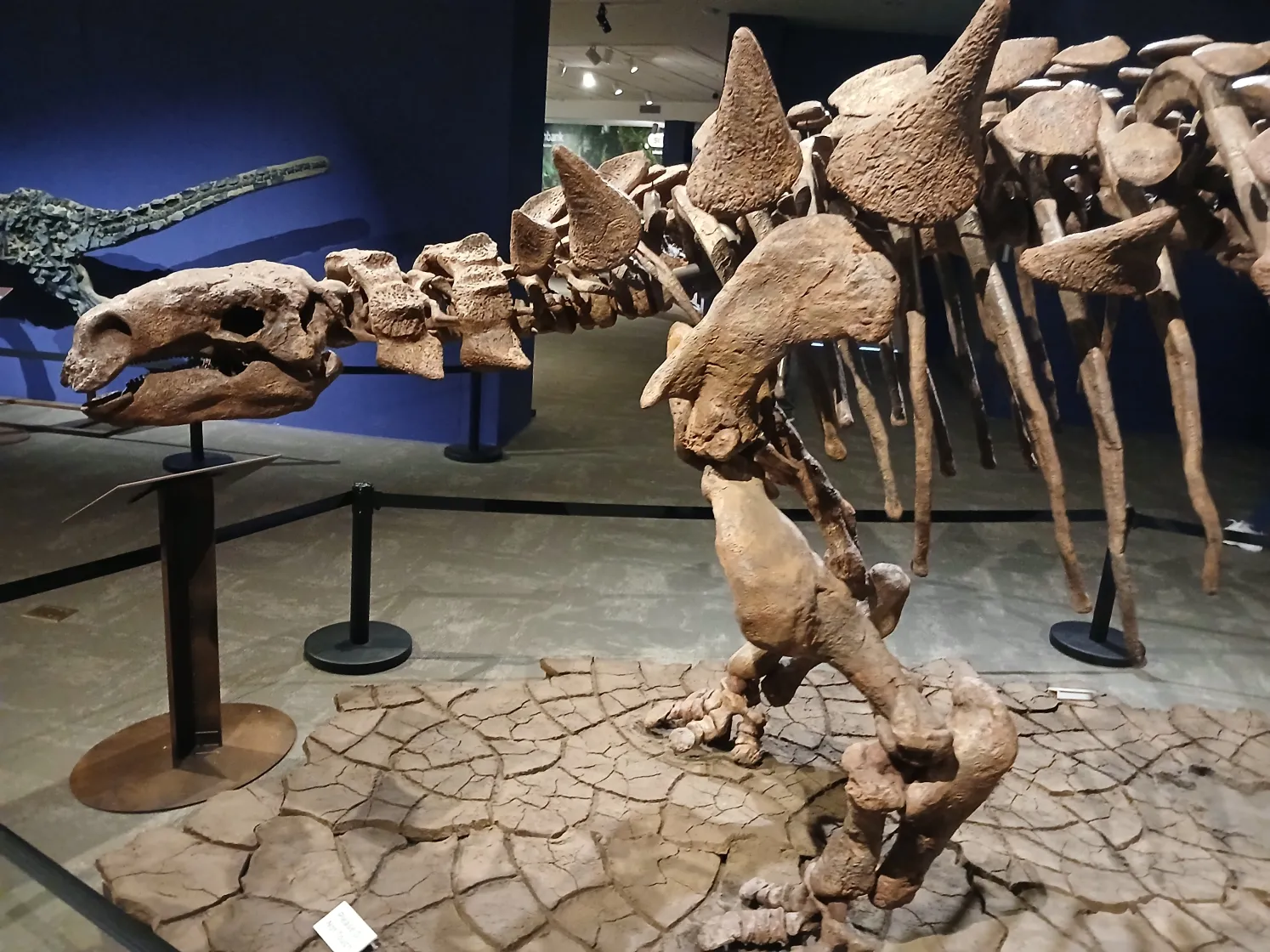
Reconstructed skeletal mount

Carpenter et al. (2008) originally gave Peloroplites an estimated length of 5-5.5 metres (16-18 feet). However, Gregory S. Paul in 2016 gave a higher estimate of 6 metres (20 feet) and a weight of 2 tonnes (4,410 lbs).

Carpenter et al. (2008) diagnosed Peloroplites based on the lack of premaxillary teeth, occiput sloping forwards and towards the back, the absence of a prominent lateral temporal notch towards the back as in Sauropelta, small and blunt squamosal horns, paroccipital process projecting from the sides, a vertical quadrate that isn't anteriorly bowed or sloped on the underside of the front, a very short odontoid, a short axis centrum which is as long as it is tall, and similar coracoid to scapula proportions to Animantarx and Edmontonia.

=== Cranium ===
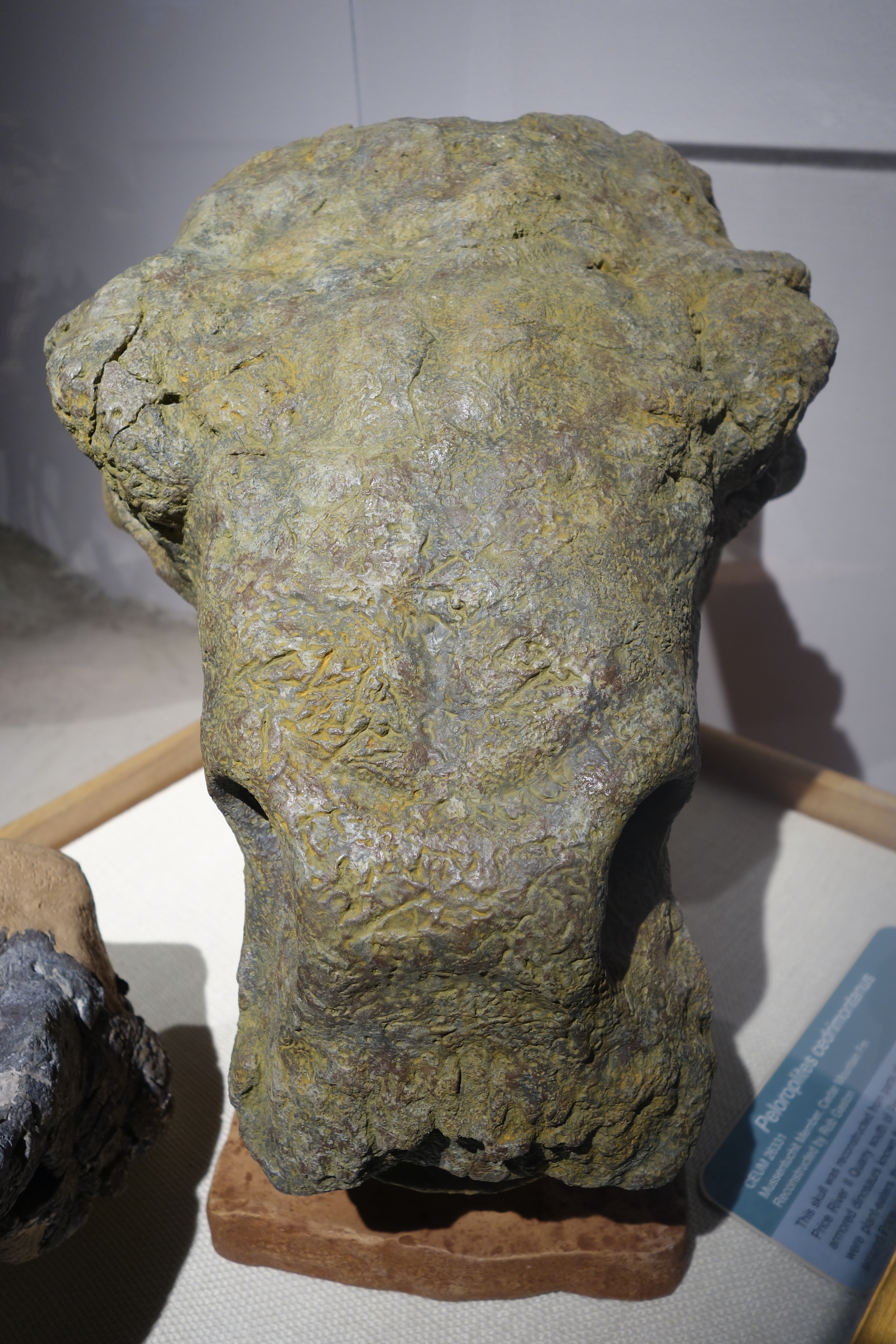
Skull of Peloroplites in anterodorsal view

The skull of Peloroplites has an estimated length of 56 cm and a maximum width of 35.5 cm between the dorsal orbital rims, which is about the same width as Sauropelta. The snout tapers towards the front and ends at a relatively broad premaxillary beak, as compared to Silvisaurus. The premaxillae are fused along their mid-line and are dorsoventrally thick, unlike Gastonia whereas they are thin. Although the side of the left premaxilla is damaged, the width of the premaxillary beak is estimated to be 18 cm. The upper side of the premaxillae is rugose for the keratinous beak and arched in front view. In addition, the beak has a broad, inverted U-shaped notch. A groove is present near the lower margins of the beak in front view and continues to the palatal side, defining the side edge of the tomial ridge. Both the prefrontals and lachrymals are fused and the presence of the lachrymals is inferred from the lachrymal foramen seen within the front orbital wall. Both sets of prefrontal-lachrymals are triangular in upper and side view and have rugose sculpturing external surfaces that are composed of irregular pits which is especially prominent over the orbits. The front of the orbit has a faint, shallow groove which extends onto the upper surface of the prefrontal and probably outline the margins between adjoining keratinous scales, a feature also similarly seen in other nodosaurids such as Edmontonia. The prefrontal-lachrymals are divided by the front orbital wall towards the middle, which separates the orbit from the nasal cavity. The orbit has a concave upper surface. The postorbital, squamosal, jugal, quadratojugal, and quadrate are coossified on both sides of the skull. The postorbital horncores are conical structures that are very low that project dorsolaterally, which are much less prominent than those of Pawpawsaurus, Sauropelta and Gastonia. The jugal-quadratojugal horncores appear as low, localized thickening of bone as they are not prominent on the skull unlike Gastonia and Animantarx. The jugal probably composes the ventral rim of the orbit and forms a medial-lateral narrow floor to the orbit. As in other dinosaurs, the posterior rim of the orbit is composed of the postorbital and jugal. The orbit is widely separated from the lateral temporal fenestra on the sides of the skull, as in Edmontonia and Pawpawsaurus. The squamosal is fused to the head of the quadrate and the quadrates are slightly bowed towards the front. The frontoparietal region is slightly domed and is moderately arched towards the sides in posterior view. The paroccipital process faces obliquely downwards, similar to Edmontonia and Animantarx. As in other nodosaurids, the supraoccipital crest is weakly developed. The proatlas has a facet that is seen on the right side, although it is partially damaged. The exoccipital is also damaged on the left side while the exoccipital-basioccipital suture of the right side is fused. The occipital condyle has the typical shape of nodosaurids, and the condyle neck has an upper surface that is slightly concave. The basioccipital-basisphenoid suture is fused on the underside and the basioccipital is twice as long as the basisphenoid. The posterior pterygoid plate is present anterior to the parasphenoid and is concave as in Edmontonia. A tooth from a maxillary fragment is similar to some teeth referred to Priconodon and has an extensive wear facet that extends the entire face of the crown as seen in ankylosaurids.

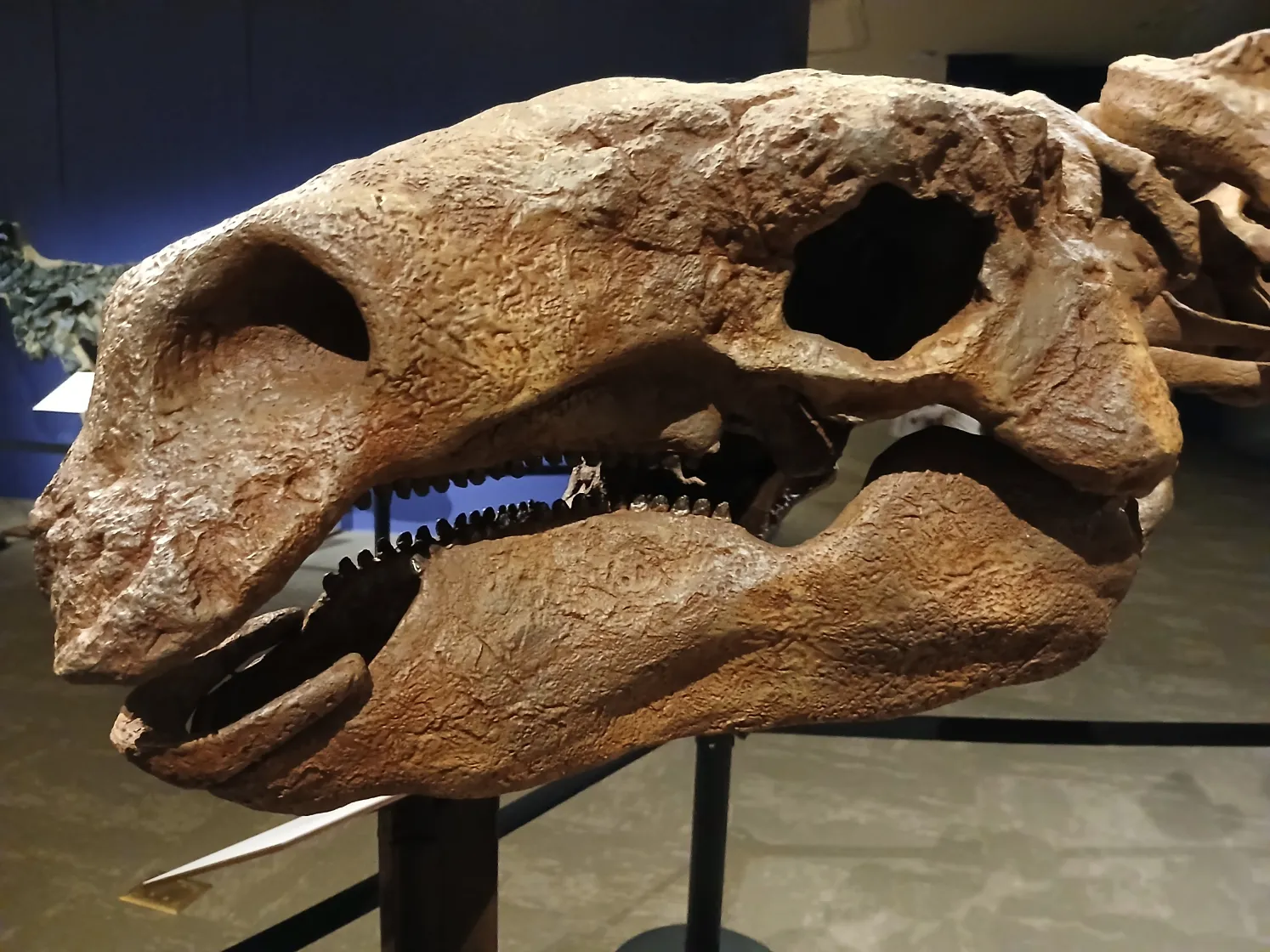
Skull of Peloroplites in lateral view

Only the rear portions of the left and right mandibles are preserved and include the articular, angular, surangular and prearticular. The posterior surface is remodelled on the sides and gives the appearance of a coossified osteoderm. However, the internal surface of the mandible is revealed by a crack on the right portion and does not support such interpretation. The adductor fossa is large and lateral-medially and is separated from the articular by a wall, both are features that are not seen in Edmontonia or Animantarx. The articular cotyle is deeper relative to the size of the bone and may correspond to the deeper and thicker retroarticular as well. The large size of the adductor fossa, along with the large teeth, suggest a strong correlation that might relate to a diet of tougher forage.

=== Postcrania ===
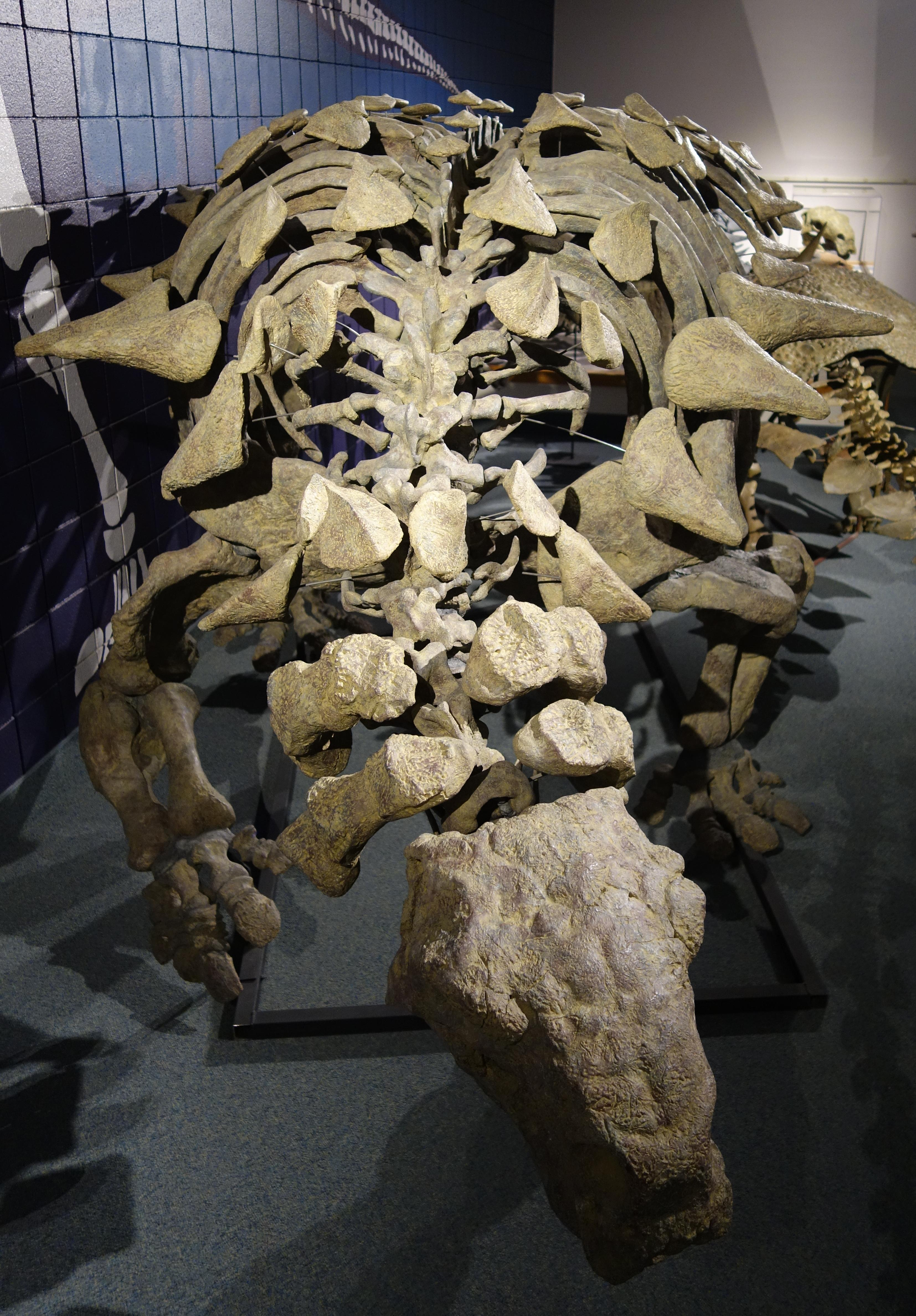
Reconstructed skeleton in anterior view

The total vertebral count of Peloroplites is unknown and the atlas has not been found. The axis is nearly complete but lacks the neural spine and postzygapophyses. The fragment of neural spine is more recumbent than in Sauropelta and the centrum is almost as tall as it is long, unlike Sauropelta. Additionally, the sides of the centrum are concave, and the odontoid is short rather than long as in Sauropelta. The prezygapophysis is seen on the right side of the atlas, near the neural canal. The diapophysis is short and located at the end of the midline on the centrum which is contrast to Sauropelta as it occurs on the neural arch instead. The post-atlas cervical vertebrae consist mostly of centra except for one nearly complete anterior cervical. The centrum of this vertebra is short and slopes to the point where the posterior articular face is lower than the anterior face, a feature seen in Edmontonia but not Sauropelta or Cedarpelta. Unlike Cedarpelta, Sauropelta and Edmontonia, the articular face of Peloroplites is circular, rather than heart-shaped, hexagonal or horizontally ellipsoid. The neural spine of the anterior cervical was anteroposteriorly narrow and the anterior margin of the spine extends down between the prezygapophyses as a ridge. The neural arch is anteroposteriorly short, tall and erect which results in the postzygapophyses not reaching the level of the posterior face of the centrum. The prezygapophysis is short and angled upwards while the diapophysis is long and steeply angled towards the ventral and posterior sides. The dorsal vertebrae are represented by several vertebrae. The centra are amphiplatyan, lack nodochordal projections and are shorter than tall, specifically in the centra of the anterior dorsal vertebrae. The centrum of Peloroplites is strongly concave in the ventral margin and the prezygapophyses are steeply angled. The transverse processes are angled upwards and end in subtriangular diapophyses. In addition, a ridge extends along the transverse process ventrally to the parapophysis located on a short neural arch. As typical for other ankylosaurs, the ribs are coossified with the vertebrae. The synsacrum of Peloroplites consists of six coossified vertebrae, as in Silvisaurus. The vertebrae consist of three probably true sacrals, a dorsal and two caudal vertebrae. All the synsacral vertebrae are missing neural spines and most of the neural arches which may have been lost prior to burial. The sacral ribs are damaged with the exception for the right second rib which retains a portion of the acetabular facet. The caudal vertebrae are represented by different parts of the tail. The anterior caudal has a centrum that is wider than tall and is proportionally longer relative to height. The caudal ribs are fused to the centrum and project laterally unlike Edmontonia or Sauropelta. The distal ends of the ribs are expanded and lack a developed dorsal process. The caudal ribs also project laterally and ventrally. The caudal neural spines were expanded towards the sides. The neural arch encloses a subcircular neural canal. The centrum of the distal caudal vertebrae elongated relative to its height.

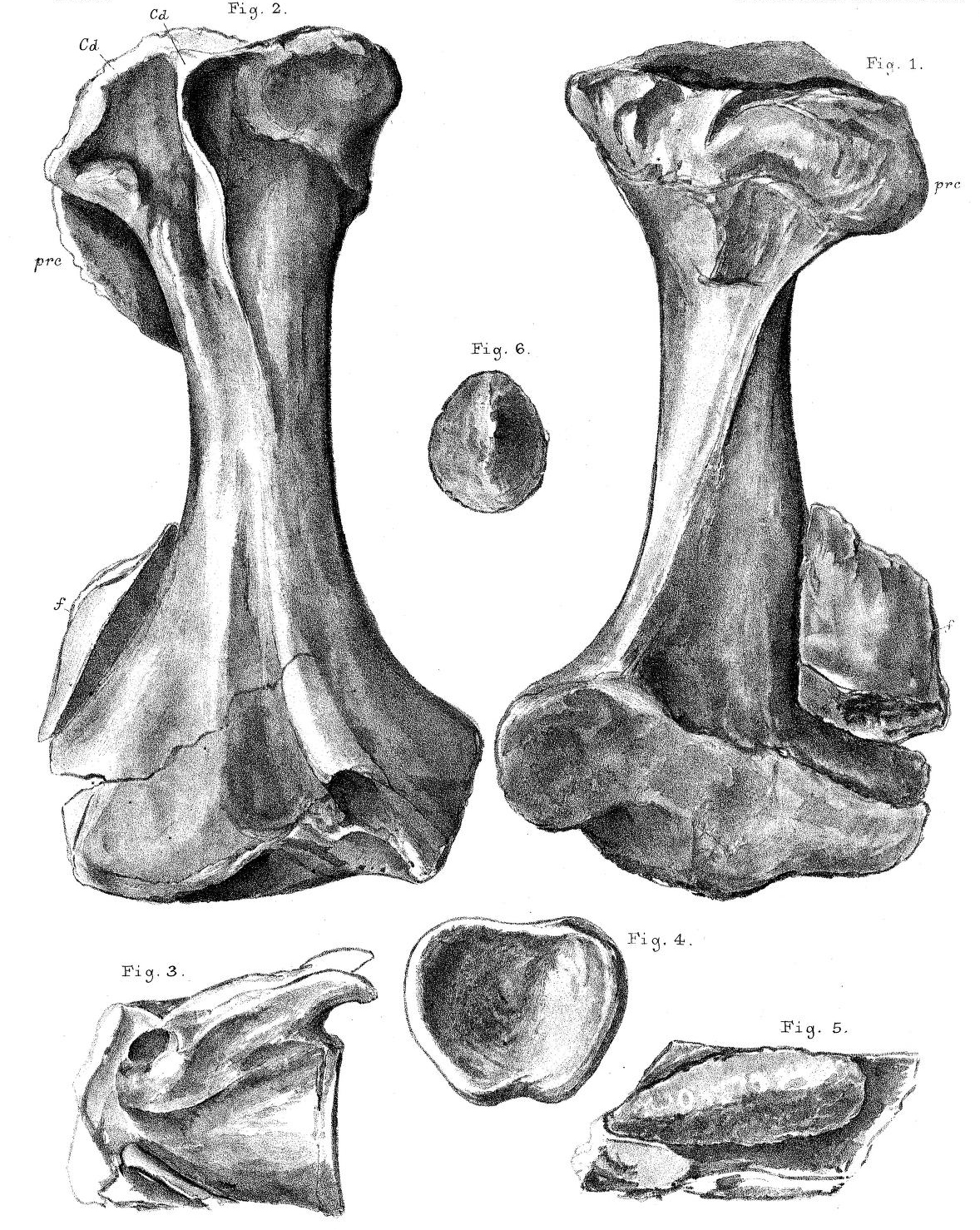
Tibia, vertebra and scutes of the closely related Polacanthus

The right scapula and coracoid are coossified and are almost complete. The scapula has a damaged acromion process, which appear to be pathological due to avulsion of the deltoideus clavicularis. The remains of the acromion process indicates that it had a similar position on scapula as Edmontonia. The scapular blade is intermediate in shape between curved and straight. The posterior margin of the scapula is rounded and, like most ankylosaurs, is large and deep. The coracoid almost as long as the scapula and is pierced by the coracoid foramen. Parts of the humeri are known and enough of the crest remains to show that the humeral shaft is elongated in a similar condition to Sauropelta, Edmontonia, Animantarx, and Gastonia. The radial and ulnar condyles are widely separated. The radius more closely resembles that of Edmontonia as the radius lacks the extreme expanded ends seen in Sauropelta. The ulna is long and straight unlike the bowed ulna of Sauropelta or the short and massive of Cedarpelta and Gastonia. The olecranon process partially overhangs the humeral notch. The carpals are unknown and a partial manus was found in loose association with some of the forelimb material. The manus has a complete set of metacarpals. The metacarpals have proximal ends that are faceted and fit close against one another. Metacarpal I is sub-rectangular and has a subtriangular proximal end, a condition similar to that of ceratopsians. In addition, metacarpal I is the largest in the manus and no distal condyles. The rest of the metacarpals are hourglass shaped and have expanded proximal and distal ends. Metacarpal II has a subtriangular proximal end and weakly separated distal condyles. As in other ankylosaurs, metacarpal III is the most robust and longest metacarpal in the manus. The distal condyles of metacarpal III are separate unlike Sauropelta and Nodosaurus. Metacarpal IV is roughly the same length as metacarpal I and is subpentagonal. The distal condyles of metacarpal IV form a single surface rather than being separate. The smallest metacarpal in the series is metacarpal V, although it is slightly more robust than metacarpal IV. Metacarpal V has a rounded distal end, with no development of condyles that are separated. All the phalanges are anteroposteriorly short, have very shallow proximal articular surfaces and lack distal condyles. Due to the shortness of the phalanges, the lateral collateral ligament pits are absent. Phalanx I-1 is the largest and the longest of the phalanxes. The distal unguals are disc-shapes as they are wider than long and rounded.

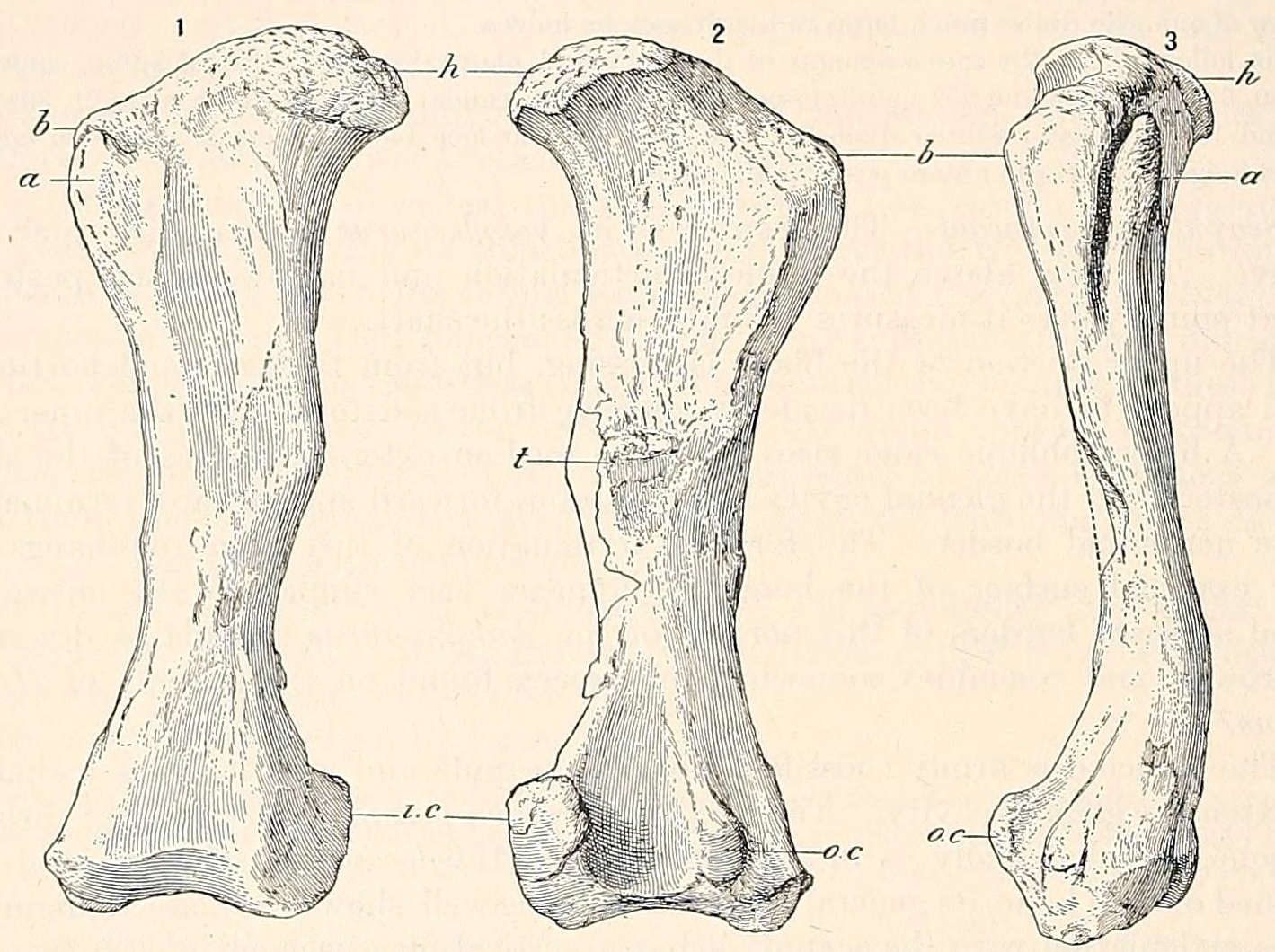
Femur of the closely related Hoplitosaurus

A 2011 study by Philip J. Senter suggested that the metacarpal configuration of Peloroplites and other ankylosaurs were positioned in a vertical semi-tube configuration, similar to that of sauropods, as the metacarpals are wedge-shaped in proximal view which fit tightly in such position without gaps between the proximal gaps and proximal surfaces. A right ilium and left pubis represent the only material of the pelvis. The preacetabular process of the pelvis diverges 55° unlike Sauropelta where it diverges 39° and 28° in Edmontonia. However, the degree of divergence might possibly be an artefact of not having a complete medial surface. The postacetabular process is broad and short. Additionally, the lateral surface is almost straight rather than concave. The pubis is robust and has a lateral face that forms the anterior wall of the acetabulum. The preacetabular process is short, straight and thick, while the postpubic process is short and angled posteroventrally. Both the left and right femora are complete and are relatively straight shafted. The head of the femora are set at a slight upward angle. The left femur preserves an oblique transverse ridge that is present below the greater trochanter but is damaged and better seen on the right femur. The cnemial crest of the tibia is short and rounded in profile. The tibial shaft is thick throughout its length and astragalus is not fused to the distal end of the tibia. Only a right metatarsal and ungual are known of the hindfoot. The metatarsal is proportionally shorter and more robust than the metacarpals of the manus. As in Sauropelta, the proximal end of the metatarsal is sloped laterally in anterior view and the distal condyles are well developed. The ungual is broad throughout its length.

== Phylogeny ==
Carpenter et al. (2008) originally placed Peloroplites within Nodosauridae but did not conduct a phylogenetic analysis to determine its exact relationships within the clade. Thompson et al. (2012) recovered Peloroplites as sister taxon to Polacanthus, a position also recovered by Chen et al. (2013). However, Yang et al. (2013) found Peloroplites to be sister taxon to both Taohelong and Polacanthus, while Zheng et al. (2018) found it to be sister taxon to Taohelong and a large clade containing more nested taxa such as Nodosaurus, Edmontonia, Struthiosaurus and Europelta. Rivera-Sylva et al. (2018) placed Peloroplites as sister taxon to Sauropelta, Taohelong and a clade containing more nested taxa.

A phylogenetic analysis conducted by Rivera-Sylva et al. (2018) and modified by Madzia et al. (2021) is reproduced below.

- Nodosauridae
  - - Sauroplites
    - Mymoorapelta
    - Dongyangopelta
  - - Gastonia
    - - Gargoyleosaurus
      - - Polacanthinae
          - Hoplitosaurus
          - Polacanthus
        - Nodosaurinae
          - Peloroplites
          - - Taohelong
            - Sauropelta
            - - Acantholipan
              - Nodosaurus
              - - Niobrarasaurus
                - Ahshislepelta
              - - Tatankacephalus
                - - Silvisaurus
                  - - CPC 273
                    - - Panoplosaurini
                        - Animantarx
                        - - Panoplosaurus
                          - - Patagopelta
                            - Texasetes
                            - Denversaurus
                            - Edmontonia longiceps
                            - Edmontonia rugosidens
                      - Struthiosaurini
                        - - Hungarosaurus
                          - Europelta
                        - - Pawpawsaurus
                          - Stegopelta
                          - Struthiosaurus languedocensis
                          - - Struthiosaurus transylvanicus
                            - Struthiosaurus austriacus

The results of an earlier analysis by Thompson et al. (2012) are reproduced below.

- Nodosauridae
  - Antarctopelta
  - - - Mymoorapelta
      - - Hylaeosaurus
        - Anoplosaurus
    - - Tatankacephalus
      - Horshamosaurus
      - Polacanthinae
        - Gargoyleosaurus
        - Hoplitosaurus
        - - Gastonia
          - - Peloroplites
            - Polacanthus
      - - - Struthiosaurus
          - Zhejiangosaurus
        - - Hungarosaurus
          - - Animantarx
            - - Niobrarasaurus
              - Nodosaurus
              - Pawpawsaurus
              - Sauropelta
              - Silvisaurus
              - Stegopelta
              - Texasetes
              - - Edmontonia
                - Panoplosaurus

== Paleobiology ==
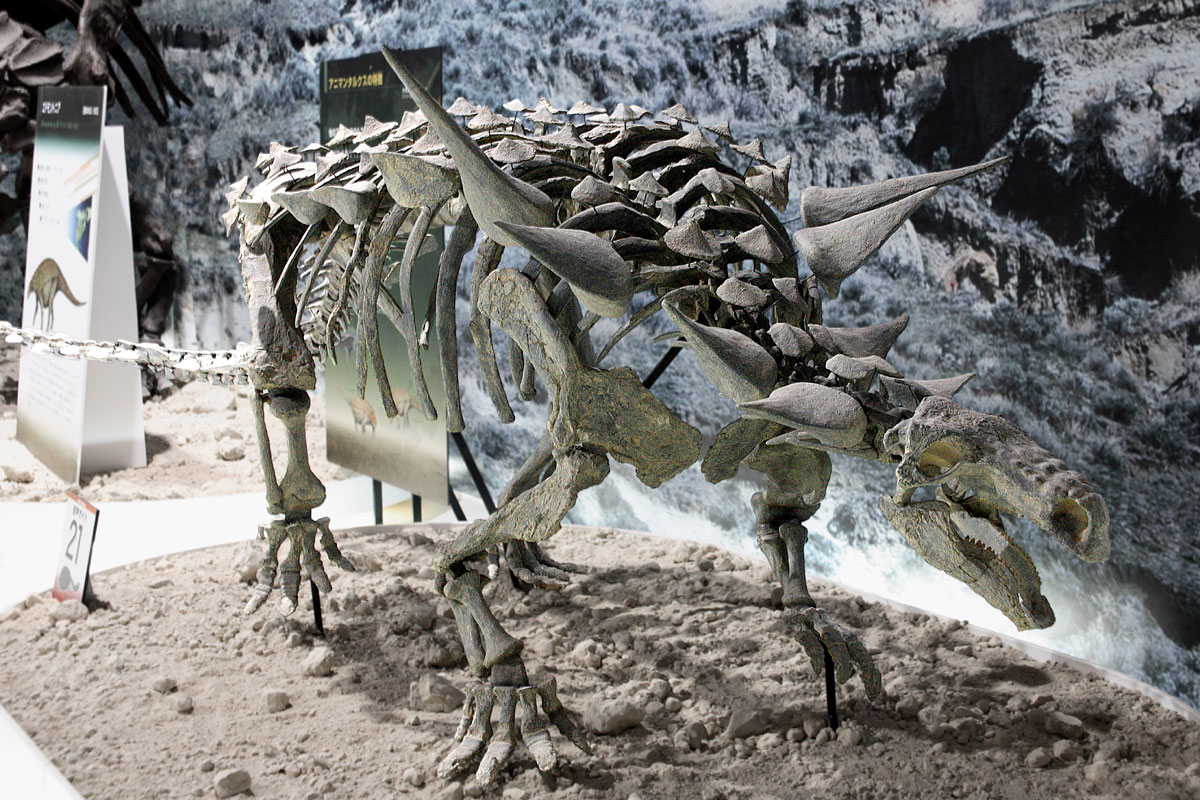
Animantarx, another ankylosaur from the Cedar Mountain Formation

Peloroplites is known from the uppermost part of the Cedar Mountain Formation, a layer known as the Mussentuchit Member. The layer was originally interpreted as being of Aptian to Albian age (~109–116 Ma) using radiometric dating. However, other radioistopic datings places the Mussentuchit Member in the Cenomanian to early Turonian age (98.2 ± 0.6 to 93 Ma). The Mussentuchit Member has been interpreted as a either a wet, lacustrine environment or a fluvial environment like a distal delta system at the western margin of the Western Interior Seaway.

Peloroplites was contemporaneous with the basal hadrosauromorph Eolambia, the brachiosaurid sauropod Abydosaurus, the tyrannosauroid Moros, the carcharodontosaurian Siats, the indeterminate coelurosaur Richardoestesia, the ankylosaurs Animantarx and Cedarpelta, the thescelosaurid cf. Zephyrosaurus, an indeterminate neoceratopsian, an indeterminate pachycephalosaurid, an indeterminate velociraptorine and an indeterminate dromaeosaurine. Non-dinosaur taxa contemporaneous with Peloroplites include the crocodylomorphs Dakotasuchus, cf. Bernissartia and Machimosaurus, the lizards Bicuspidon, Dimekodontosaurus, cf. Pseudosaurillus, Bothriagenys, Harmodontosaurus, Dicothodon and Primaderma, the snake Coniophis, the amphibian Albanerpeton, the turtles Glyptops and Naomichelys, the mammals Astroconodon, Spalacotherium, Symmetrodontoides, Paracimexomys and Kokopellia, the batoids Ischyrhiza and cf. Baibisha, the hybodonts Polyacrodus, Lissodus and Hybodus, and the lungfish Ceratodus.
