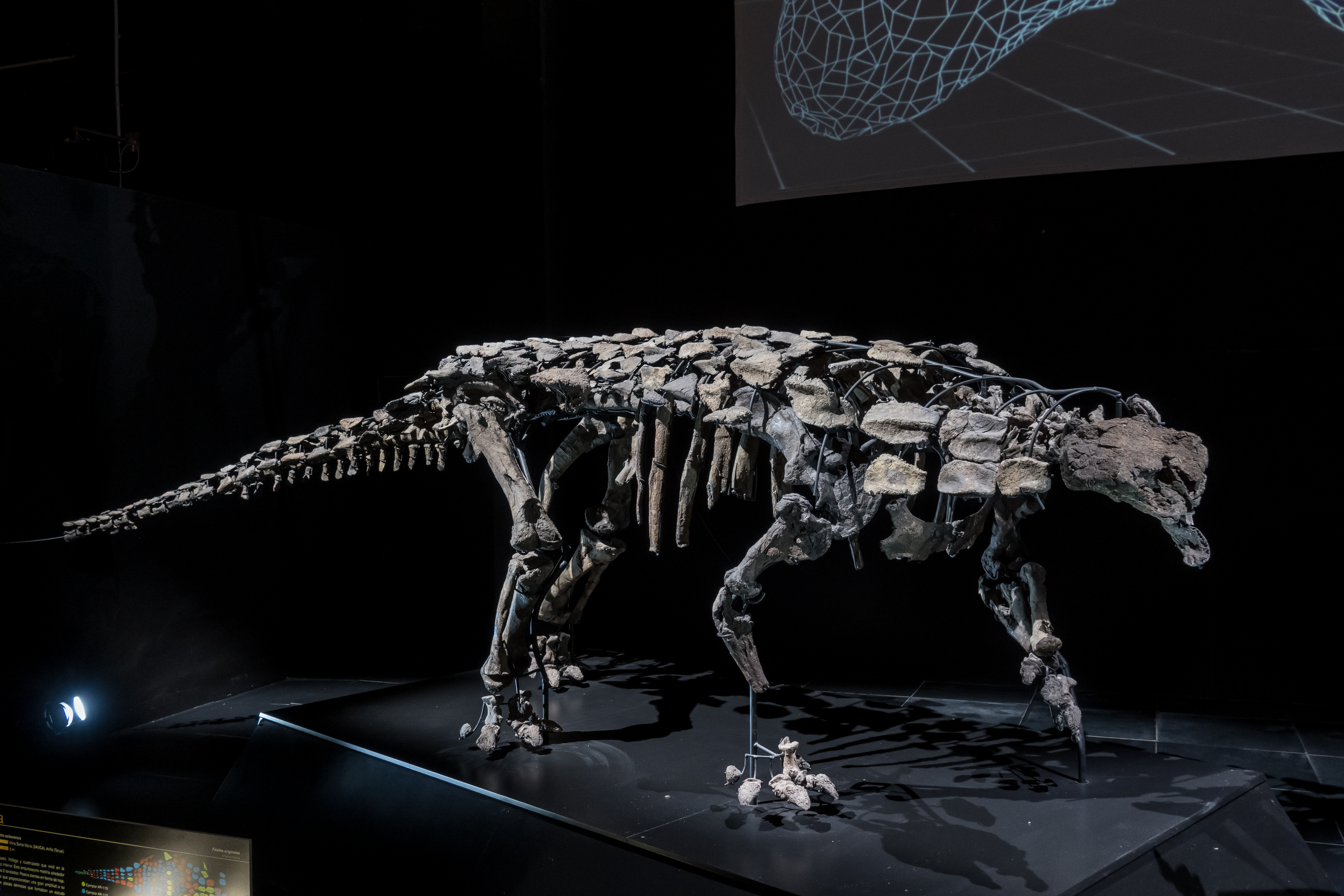
- Reconstructed skeleton, Dinopolis

Scientific classification
- Kingdom: Animalia
- Phylum: Chordata
- Class: Reptilia
- Clade: Dinosauria
- Clade: †Ornithischia
- Clade: †Thyreophora
- Clade: †Ankylosauria
- Family: †Nodosauridae
- Subfamily: †Nodosaurinae
- Clade: †Struthiosaurini
- Genus: †Europelta; Kirkland et al., 2013

Type species
- †Europelta carbonensis Kirkland et al., 2013

= Europelta =

Europelta Temporal range: Early Cretaceous, 113.0 Ma

Extinct genus of dinosaurs

Europelta (meaning "Europe's shield") is a monospecific genus of nodosaurid dinosaur from Spain that lived during the Early Cretaceous (early Albian stage, ~113.0 Ma) in what is now the lower Escucha Formation of the Teruel Province. The type and only species, Europelta carbonensis, is known from two associated partial skeletons, and represents the most complete ankylosaur known from Europe. Europelta was named in 2013 by James I. Kirkland and colleagues. Europelta has an estimated length of 5 metres (16 feet) and weight of 1.3 tonnes (2,866 lbs), making it the largest member of the clade Struthiosaurini.

== Discovery ==
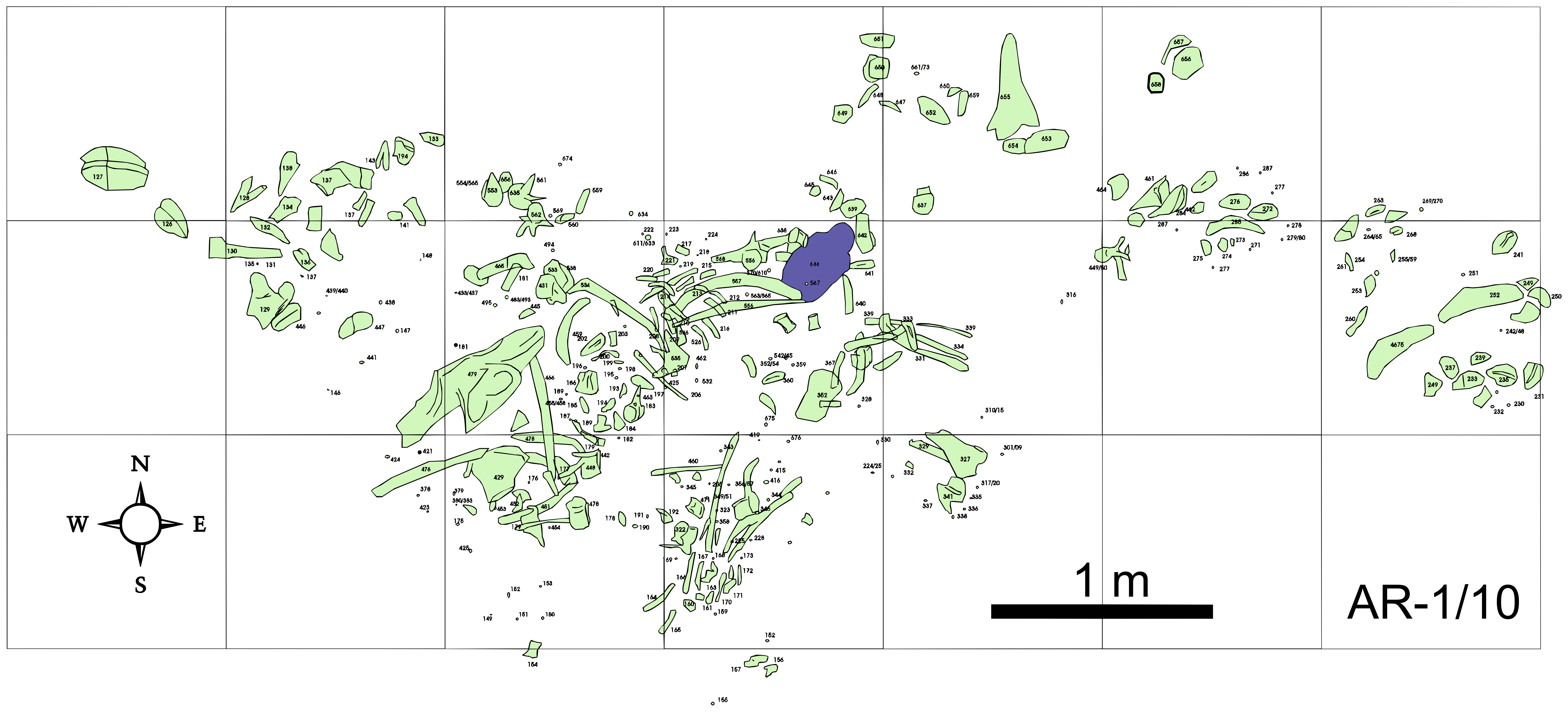

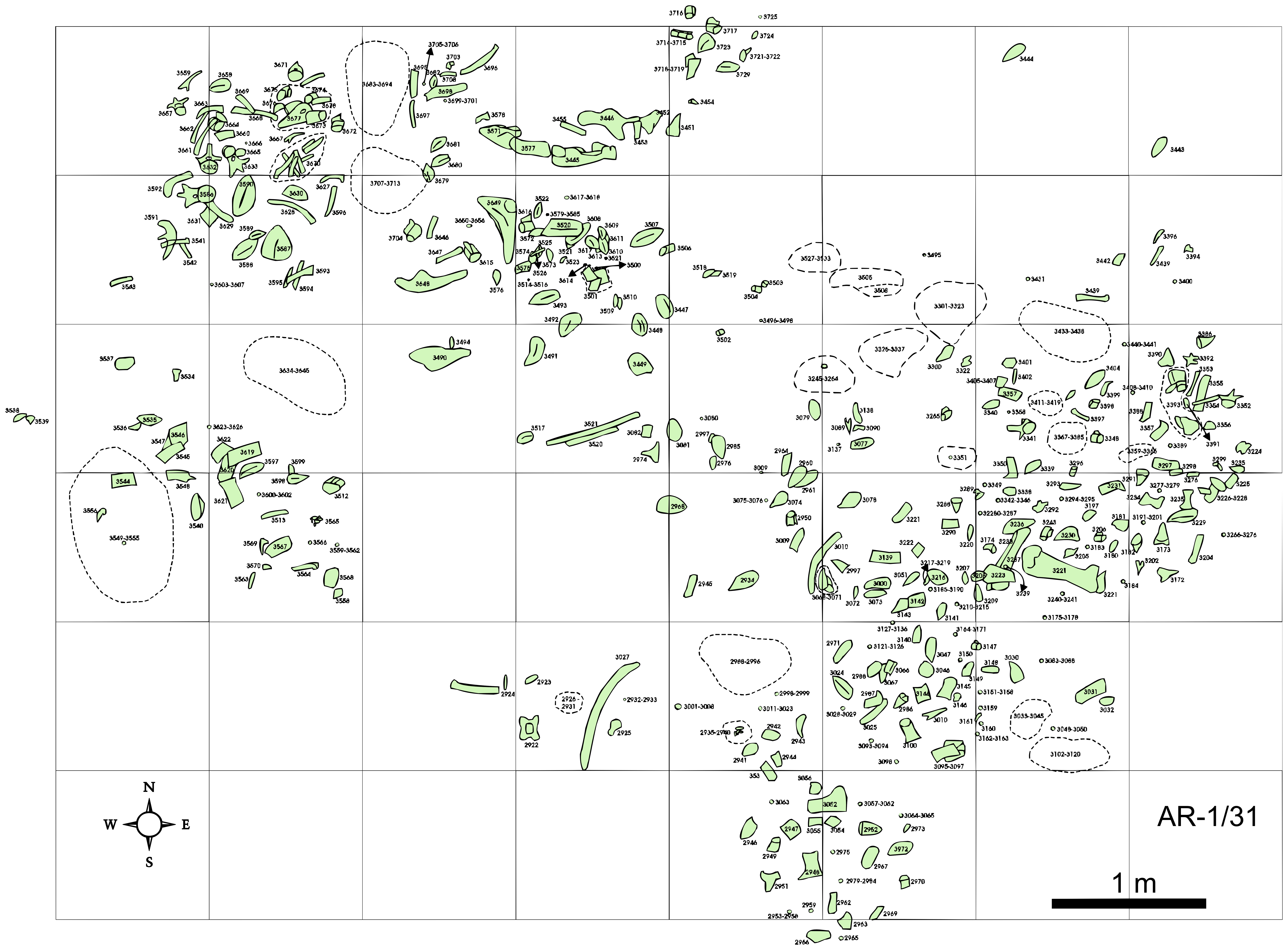
Quarry sketch map of the holotype (top) and paratype (bottom).

In 2011, the remains of two partial skeletons of an ankylosaur were discovered from the Fundación Conjunto Paleontológico of Teruel-Dinópolis locality AR-1 of the lower, located east of Ariño, in the northern Teruel Province in the Community of Aragón. The paratype of Europelta was collected 200 meters laterally from the holotype in the same bed. The site dates to the early Albian stage of the late Early Cretaceous, based on an analysis of the palynomorphs, ostracods and charophytes (calcareous nannofossils). The bonebed that the two skeletons were obtained from was located tens of meters underground preceding mining operations in the Santa María coal mine and by the end of 2012 the areal distributions of 101 vertebrate concentrations were documented that consisted of dinosaur, turtle, crocodilian and fish skeletons. The mineral Pyrite is common within the bones and in the bonebeds of the two associated skeletons, which is also common in the plant debris beds in the older Wessex Formation on the Isle of Wight. When the bones were exposed to the surface, they started to degrade due to the pyrite as indicated by the appearance of fine, powdery to crystalline gypsum coating bones and teeth, and by the shattering of some bones and teeth with internal gypsum formation.

The two associated skeletons were named as Europelta carbonensis in 2013 by James Ian Kirkland, Luis Alcalá, Mark A. Loewen, Eduardo Espílez, Luis Mampel and Jelle P. Wiersma. The holotype specimen, AR-1/10, consists of a mostly complete skull, isolated nasals, a dentary fragment, isolated teeth, an atlas, cervical vertebrae, cervical ribs, dorsal vertebrae, a section of synsacrum, isolated dorsal ribs, dorsal rib fragments, caudal vertebrae, chevrons, a coracoid with a small portion of scapula, a scapular blade fragment, xiphosternal plates, partial humeri, an ischium, an ilium, pubes, and 70 osteoderms. The second skeleton that was designated as the paratype specimen, AR-1/31, consists of a partial jaw with dentary and surangular, an isolated angular, teeth, cervical vertebrae, dorsal vertebrae, dorsosacral vertebrae, a sacrum, a caudosacral vertebra, sacral rib fragments, caudal vertebrae, an ilium, ilium fragments, ischia with fused pubes, a femur, a tibia, a fibula, a calcaneum, metatarsals, phalanges, ungual, and 90 osteoderms. Both specimens are currently housed at the Funda Museo Aragonés de Paleontología, Spain.

The generic name, Europelta, combines a contraction for Europe, as it is the most complete ankylosaur from the continent, and the Ancient Greek word pelta (shield), a common suffix for ankylosaurian genus names in reference to their armoured bodies. The specific name, carbonensis, means "from the coal", from the Latin carbo, in honour of the access provided by the Sociedad Anónima Minera Catalano-Aragonesa (SAMCA Group) to the fossil locality where Europelta was found, in the open-pit Santa María coal mine.

== Description ==
=== Size and distinguishing traits ===
Size comparison of Europelta and a human.

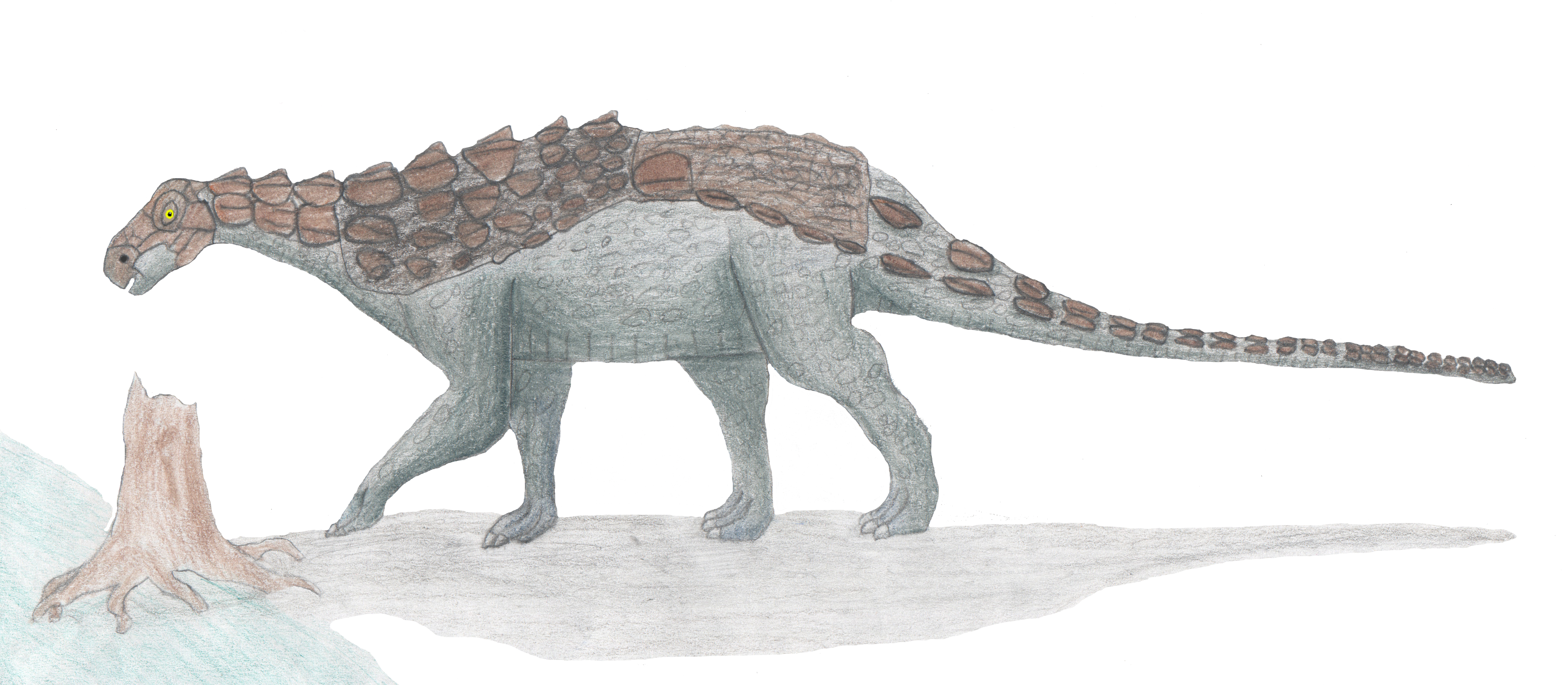
Life restoration

In 2016, Gregory S. Paul gave Europelta an estimated length of 5 metres (16 feet) and a weight of 1.3 tonnes (2,866 lbs).

Kirkland and colleagues (2013) diagnosed Europelta based on the quadrate being shorter and mediolaterally wider than in any other ankylosaur, the concave shape of the posterior margin of the skull in dorsal view, the sacrum in lateral view is arched dorsally by 55°, the pubis is fused to the ischium and has a slot-shaped foramen between the post-pubic process and the orientation of the pubic peduncle which forms an ischiopubis, the tibia is longer relative to the length of the femur than in other ankylosaurs and the presence of laterally compressed, flanged osteoderms with a flat plate-like base that are present towards the front of the pelvic shield.

=== Cranium ===
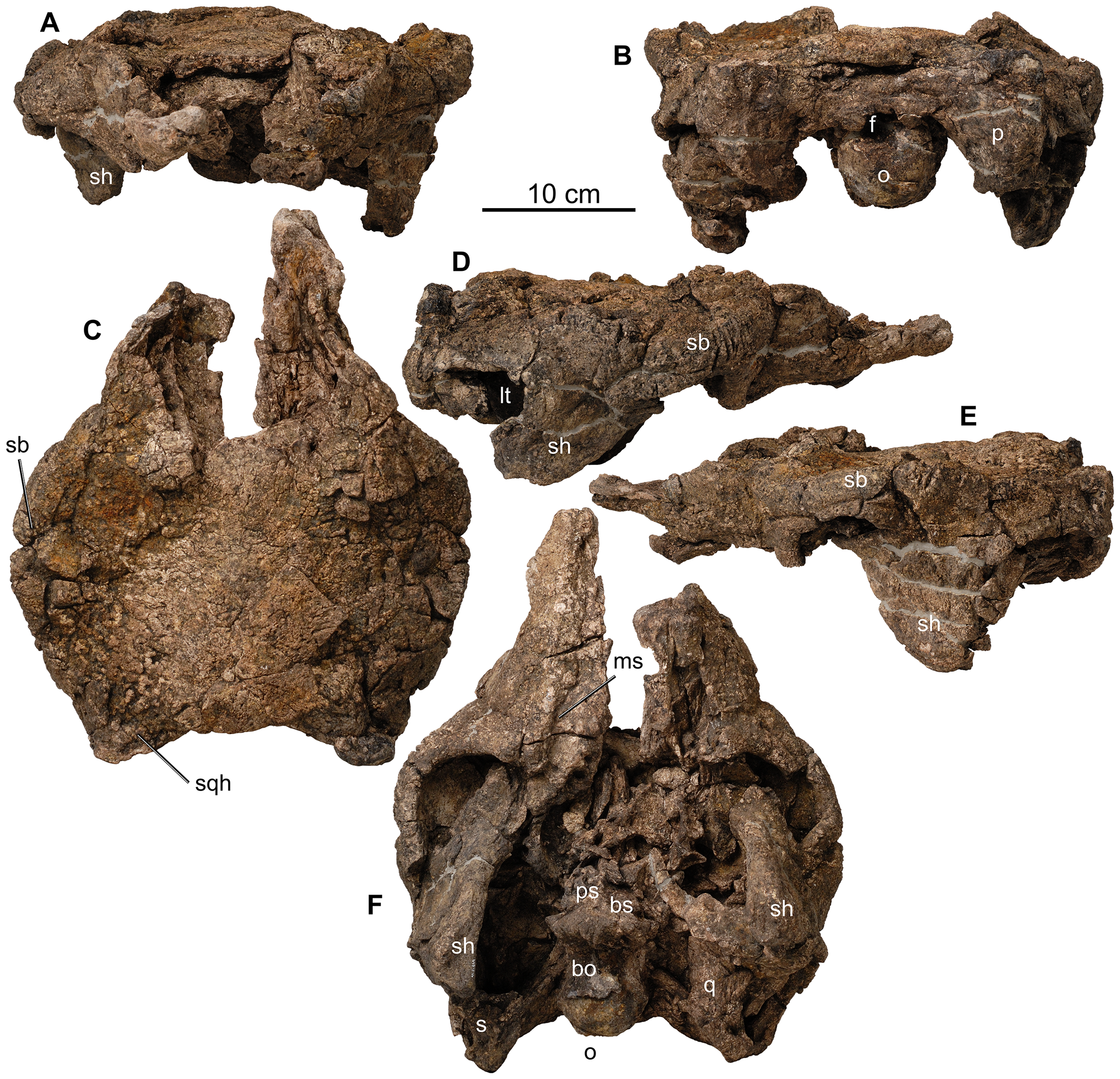
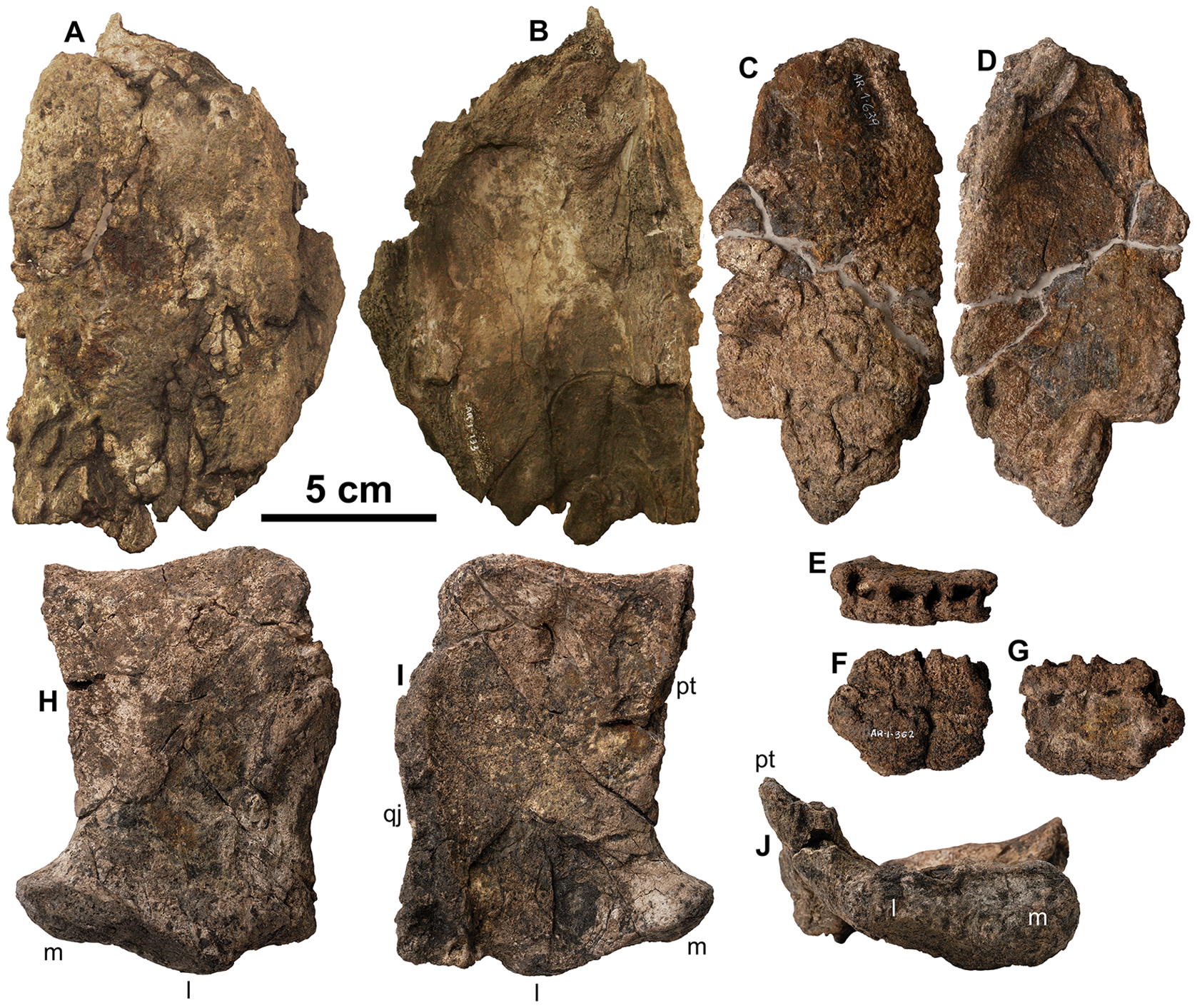
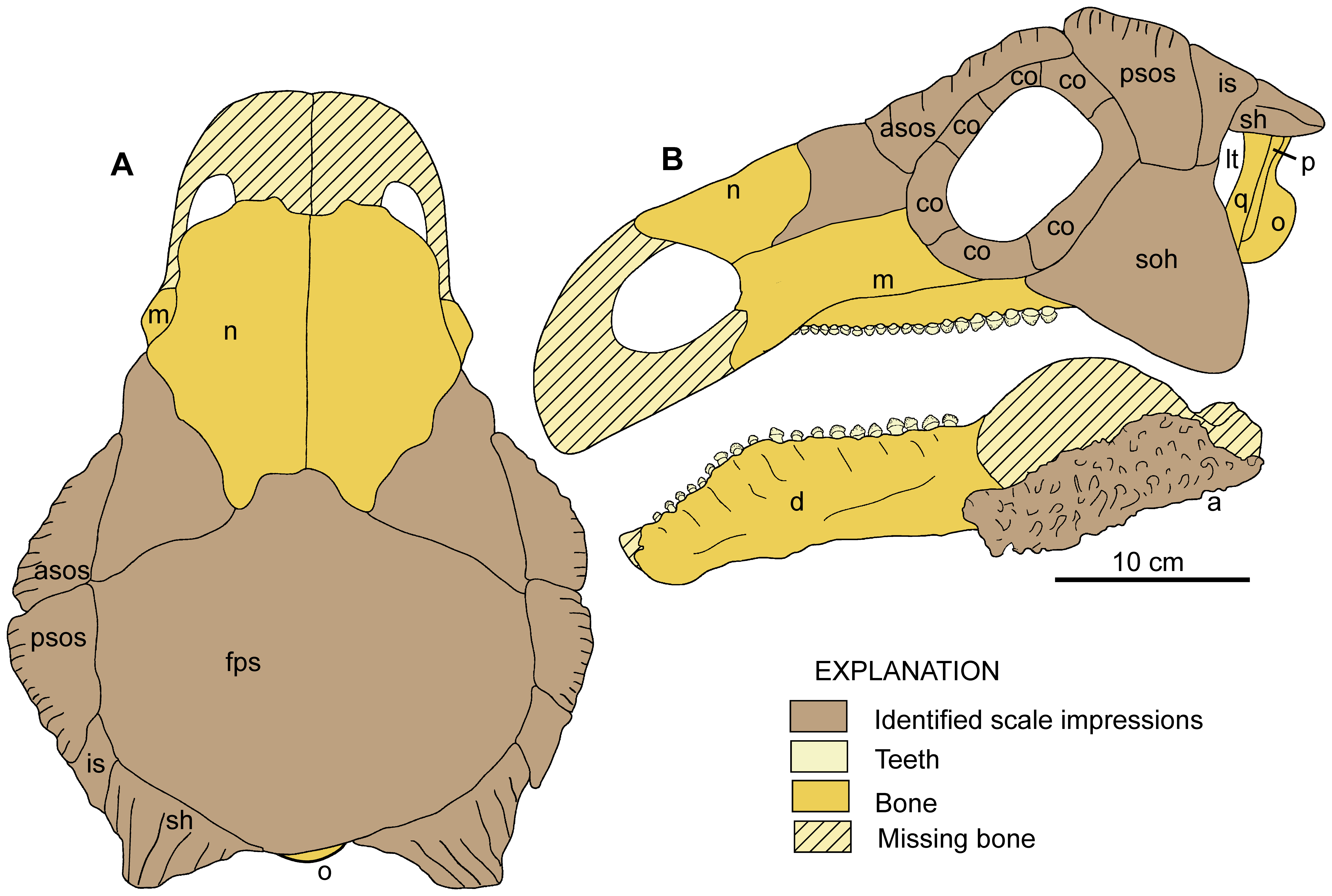
Skull fragments and restoration of the skull.

The skull was preserved with the right quadrate and associated portion of the palate dislodged and later crushed across the ventral side of the basicranium which gives the impression that the quadrate and palate bones were expelled from inside the skull preceding compaction. The skull has an estimated length of 370.3 mm from the front end of the maxillae to the rear margin of the squamosals and a width of 299.1 mm that narrows to 203.7 mm, giving the skull a "pear-shape" appearance. The skull lacks a distinct post-temporal notch, which is a feature seen in polacanthines and other nodosaurids. The maxilla forms the posterior margin of a relatively simple naris in the anterior margin of the bone, which is relative to derived nodosaurids and ankylosaurids, but does not form a portion of a secondary palate. The tooth row is arched ventrally and has an estimated 22–25 alveoli that increased in size posteriorly. The palate does not have a pronounced hourglass appearance as in derived nodosaurids due to medially deflected tooth rows. The nasal taper anteriorly and are relatively subrectangular. The nasals extend laterally from their relatively unfused suture, while the nasals of most ankylosaurs are fused except for Silvisaurus and Niobrarasaurus. The nasal's posterior margin possesses a tongue-like process that would have overlapped the frontals. The narial passage was large and simple as the external surface is lightly textured and the internal surface is relatively smooth, unlike that of derived nodosaurids and ankylosaurids. The orbits have a subrectangular shape and are slightly more elongate from front to back. The suborbital horn is formed mostly from the far end of the quadratojugal to the ventral margin of the orbit. The suborbital horn is evenly rounded, unornamented and hides the head of the quadrate in side view. The lateral wall of the skull extends behind the orbit unlike those of polacanthids and most nodosaurids except for Peloroplites, Silvisaurus and Struthiosaurus. The sheet-like pterygoids flexed nearly dorsally against the front portion of the basicranium as in nodosaurids and not open transversely as in ankylosaurids or polacanthines. The mandibular articulation is more proportionally wider than in other ankylosaurs. In occipital view, the skull is subrectangular and wider than tall as in most other derived ankylosaurs. The paroccipital processes share a similar morphology and orientation to those in Gargoyleosaurus. The paroccipital processes also extend straight laterally as in most other ankylosaurs. The paroccipital has a triangular wedge of bone of unknown identity fused to it, which separates it from the quadrate. The occipital condyle is similar in overall morphology to that of Cedarpelta, except for the occipital condyle angles near the front, and there are no separate basal tubera between the basioccipital and the basisphenoid. The skull roof is roughened texturally by remodelling of the bone surface and preserves skin impressions on the margins that are represented by shallow grooves. The central portion of the skull was covered in an extensive median scale, as in other nodosaurids. A particular robust pair of scales were present along the margin of the skull based on narrow grooves near the region.

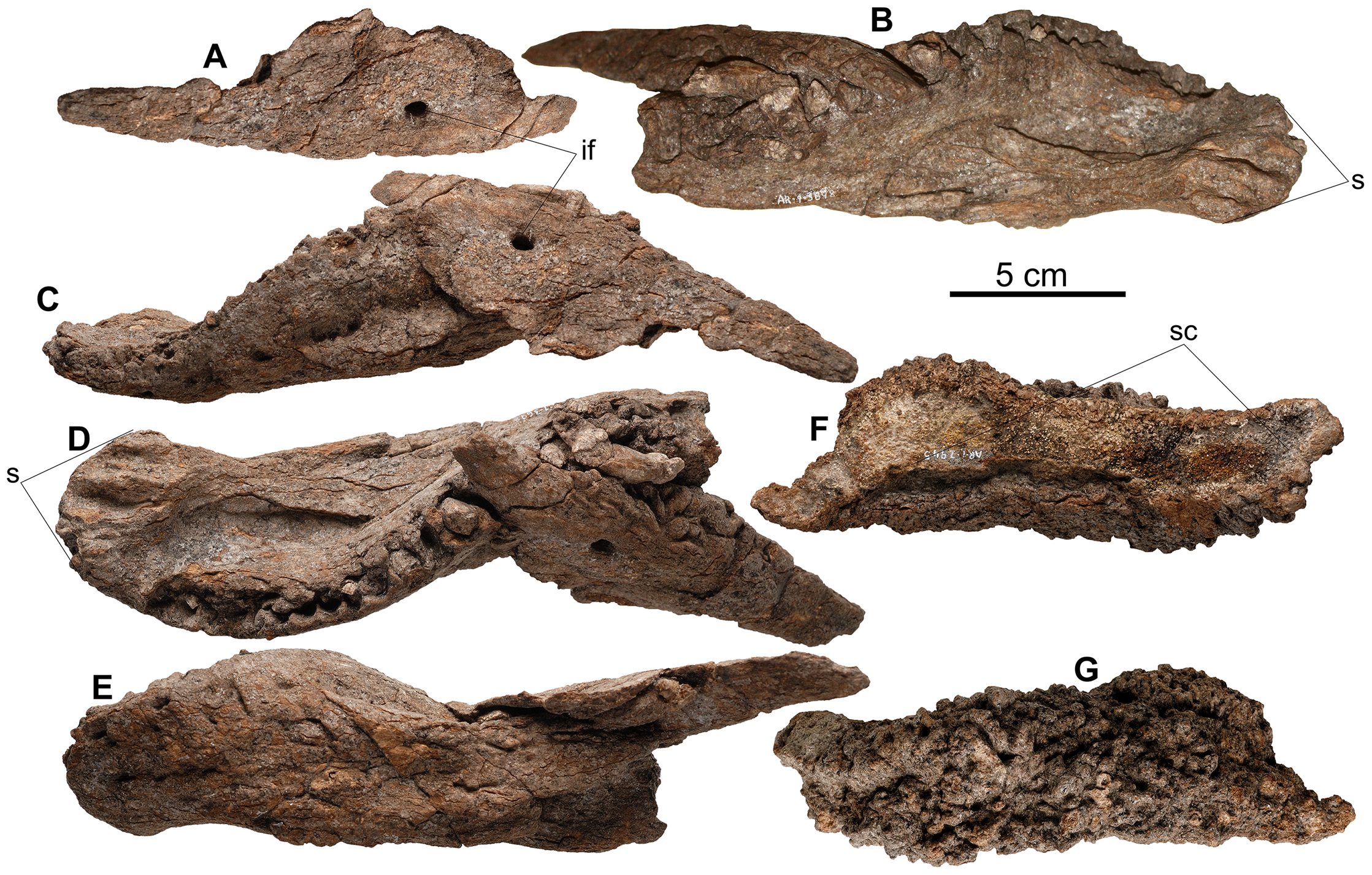
Mandible of the paratype specimen.

The dentary is 184.7 mm long and preserves a minimum of 21 tooth positions. The symphysis is robust and dorsoventrally deeper than in other ankylosaurs and would have had a reduced predentary with a rudimentary ventral process. The splenial contacts the angular and has the appearance of an obtuse triangle in medial view. The lateral margin of the angular is highly rugose, due to the texture and remodelling required to support a large scale. The mandibular ornament has a distinct ridge that marks the upper side limit and has a smooth texture towards the upper side. The extent of the textured bone supporting the mandibular scale is like that of ankylosaurids, rather than that of nodosaurids. The teeth of Europelta are similar to the teeth of Panoplosaurus and Cedarpelta but are not as high crowned as in other ankylosaurs.

=== Postcrania ===
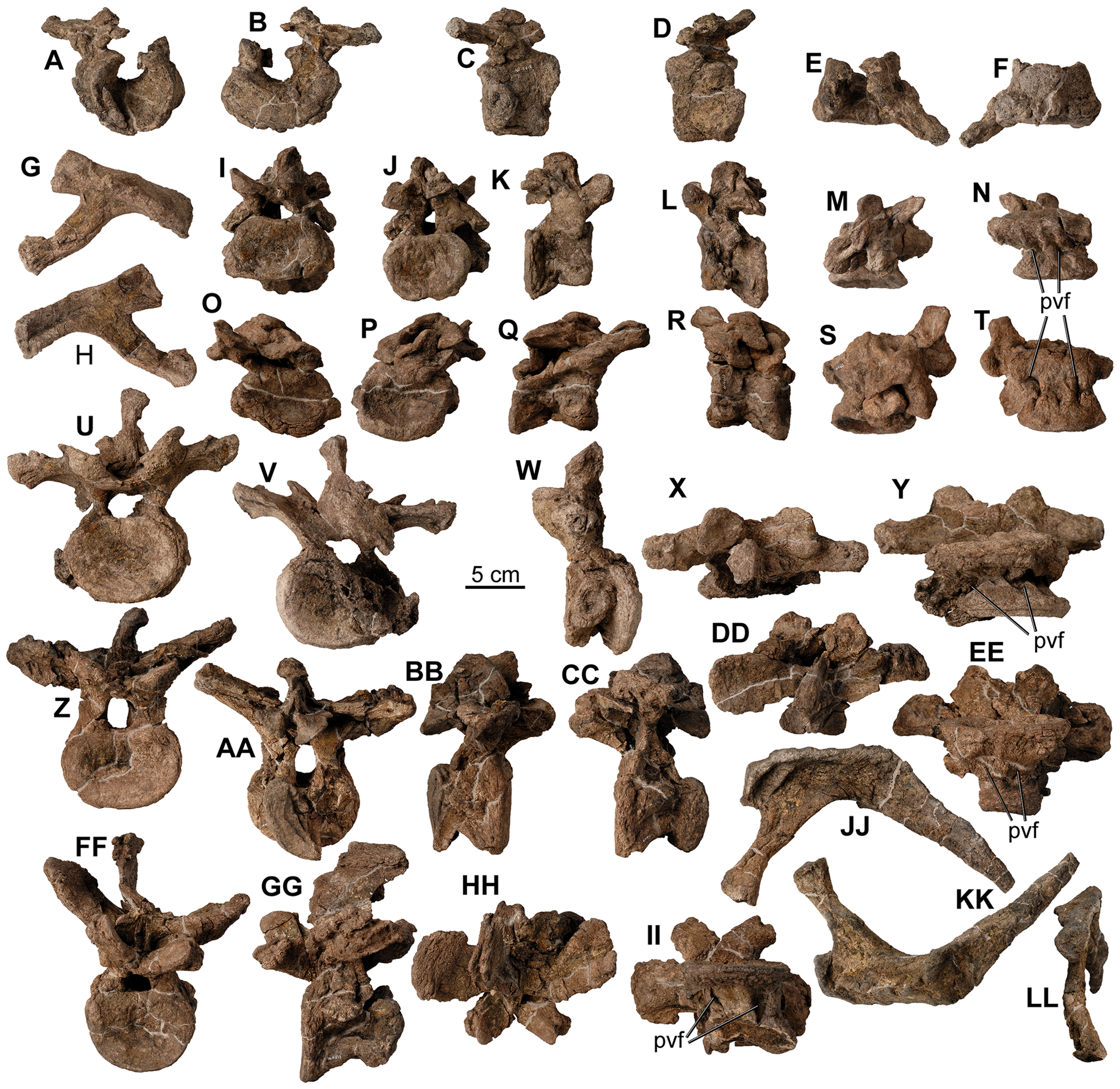
Cervical vertebrae and ribs of holotype.

The post-axis cervical vertebrae are typical of most other described ankylosaur cervical vertebrae. The centra of the vertebrae are amphicoelous, wider than tall, are short from front to back, and are constricted in the middle. The anterior centra has ventral sides that are characterized by two oriented paired fossae that extend from the front to back and are separated by a low keel. The neural spines have dorsal ends that expand transversely. The cervical ribs are Y-shaped in overall appearance and show no evidence of fusion between the cervical vertebrae. The dorsal vertebrae near the front have large cylindrical centra that are flat at both ends which lack a constricted abdominal keel with circular neural canals and fused ribs. Two dorsal vertebrae have a centra overgrown by lumpy reactive bone, which appear to be pathological. One of pathologic dorsal vertebrae has fused ribs, but the other does not. However, two additional dorsal vertebrae with fused ribs are not pathologic. The dorsal vertebrae near the back have shorter, taller, centra that are more constricted to the middle, neural canals that are compressed towards the sides, transverse processes that are more directed to the back, and lack of fused ribs. The neural spines of the dorsal vertebrae are thin and rectangular with narrowly expanded back ends. Additionally, the neural spines are situated towards the back as opposed to the neural spines that are inclined forwards of some other ankylosaurs. The paratype specimen doesn't preserve any fused ribs which suggests that this character is ontogenetic as the paratype represents a smaller and presumably younger individual than the holotype specimen.

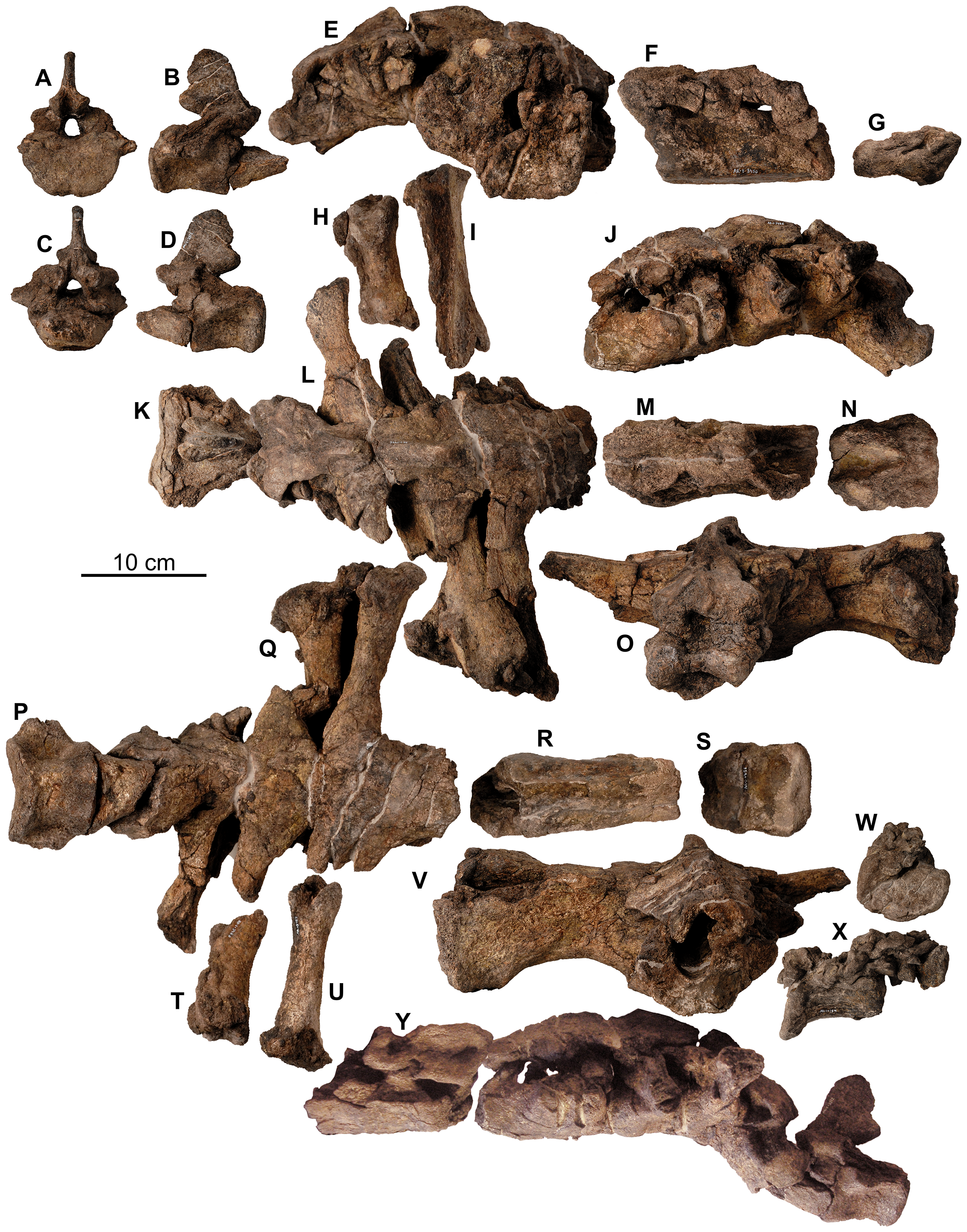
Sacrum of the paratype.

The ribs, like other ankylosaurs, are sharply arched and L-shaped in cross-section in ribs near the front and broadly arched and T-shaped in cross-section in ribs near the back. The synsacrum of Europelta is composed of five or more dorsosacral vertebrae, four sacral vertebrae, and one sacrocaudal vertebra. The dorsal synsacrum thins anteriorly in the middle section and then expands again anteriorly. Unlike other ankylosaur sacra, the sacrum of Europelta is strongly arched from the front to the back. The neural spines are fused into a vertical sheet of bone that stretches along the sacrum. The caudosacral neural spine is transitional in form between the sacral neural spines and the proximal caudal vertebrae. The neural spines are broken off at the front end. The ends of the sacral ribs are expanded and the most robust medial sacral rib taller than it is wide at its attachment with the ilium. The sacrum of Europelta is similar in overall morphology to that of Struthiosaurus languedocensis but differs in that the sacrum of Struthiosaurus isn't as strongly arched from the front to back. Europelta may have had a moderately arched sacrum based on the moderate angulation of the faces of the sacral centra in Anoplosaurus. The posterior chevron facets of the proximal caudal vertebrae are well developed, and the neural spines are inclined posteriorly. Additionally, the dorsal ends of the neural spines are only slightly expanded transversely. The caudal ribs have a dorsally concave profile in anterior view due to the caudal ribs originating high on the sides of the centrum and angle ventrally proximal to flexing laterally. The chevrons situated nearer to the centre are approximately as long as the neural spines but lack fusion to their respective caudal vertebrae. The chevron facets of the distal caudal vertebrae are well developed with the posterior facets more strongly developed than the anterior facets. The distal mid-caudal vertebrae are similar in morphology to the distal caudal vertebrae but differ in the caudal ribs are reduced to the anterior to posterior directed ridges on the sides of the margins of the centra. The faces of the distal mid-caudal vertebrae centra have continue a well-rounded to heart-shaped surface down the caudal series. The most distal four caudal vertebrae and their chevrons are fused together which form a tapering, terminal rod of bone at the end of the tail.

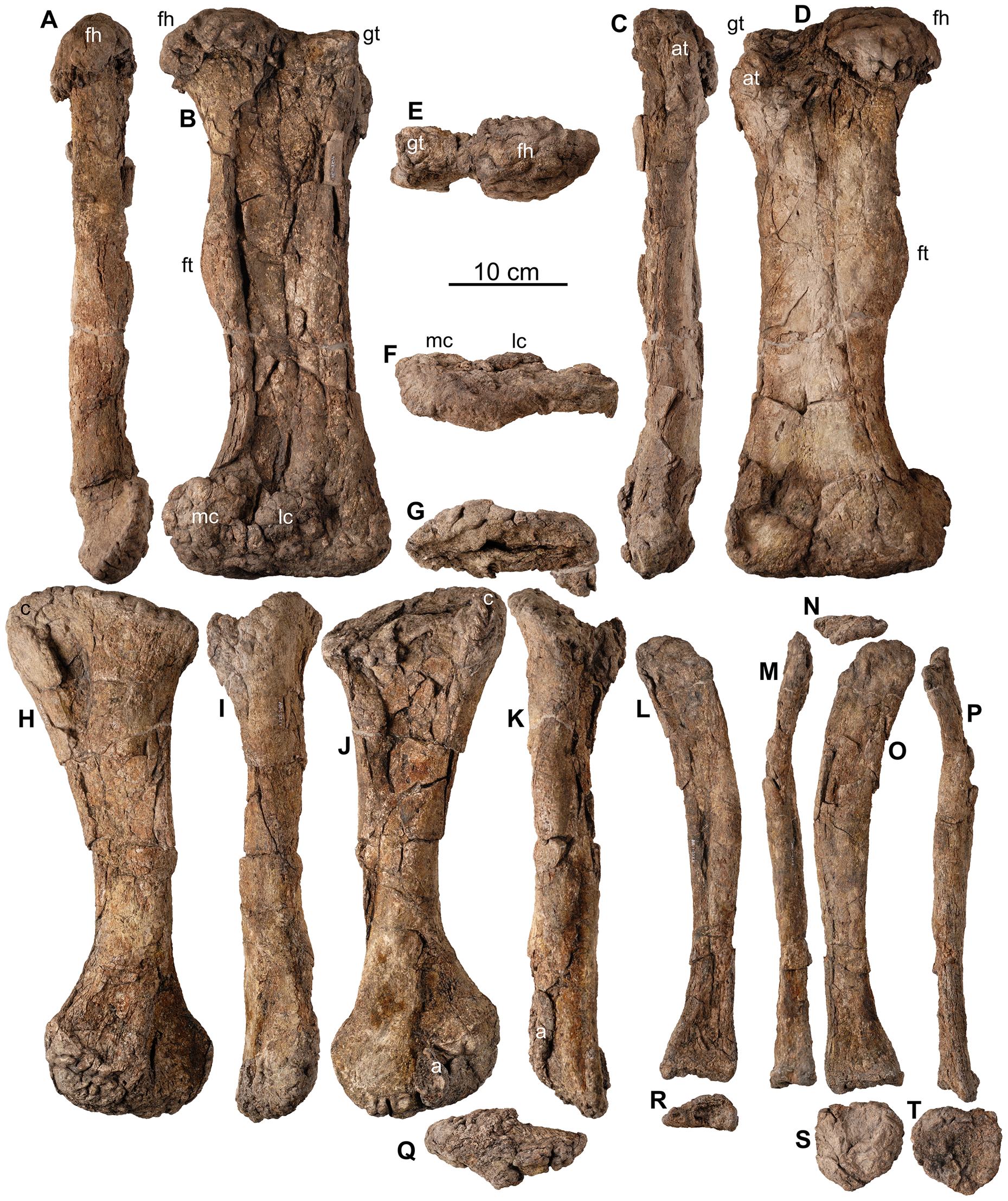
Femur, tibia, fibula and calcaneum of the paratype.

As in other nodosaurids, the pectoral girdle of Europelta preserves no evidence of any distal expansion of the scapular blade. The coracoid has a bowl-shaped appearance as the medial surface is concave and the lateral surface is convex. The ventral margin is evenly convex and there is no anteroventral process. The xiphisternal plates are arcuate flat bones and are only known in a few nodosaurids. The deltopectoral crests of the humeri extends laterally and are separated by distinct notches as in Sauropelta. Additionally, the deltopectoral crest would have made up less than 50% of the length of the humerus. The right ilium is fused with its ischium and pubis, and the acetabulum is completely enclosed as in all derived ankylosaurs. Large, closely appressed osteoderms cover the upper surface of the ilium. The pubis is fully fused to the anterior margin of the ischium as indicated by a slot-shaped foramen and represents the main body of the pubis as in the basal thyreophoran Scelidosaurus. Europelta preserves as straight ischium and represents the oldest ankylosaur with such characteristic. The ischium preserves a slight kink which was achieved by shortening the ischium distal to the bend. The femoral head has an articular surface directed dorsally and forms an angle of about 115° with the long axis of the femur. The tibia preserves a cnemial crest that is broadly rounded. The astragalus was fully fused to the tibia as in other ankylosaurs. Europelta has the proportionally longest tibia of any ankylosaur as it has a tibia to femur ratio of 0.91. The fibula is laterally flattened and has a proximal end that is not expanded anteroposteriorly. The paratype specimen preserves a calcaneum which is practically unknown in ankylosaurs except for Niobrarasaurus and a juvenile specimen of Anodontosaurus. In life, the metatarsals were closely articulated in a well-integrated pes. As in other ankylosaurs, the pedal phalanges of Europelta are short. The unguals are spade-like and share a similar morphology to the pedal unguals in other ankylosaurs. As in other nodosaurids, Europelta possessed a pes with four pedal phalanges.

=== Osteoderms ===
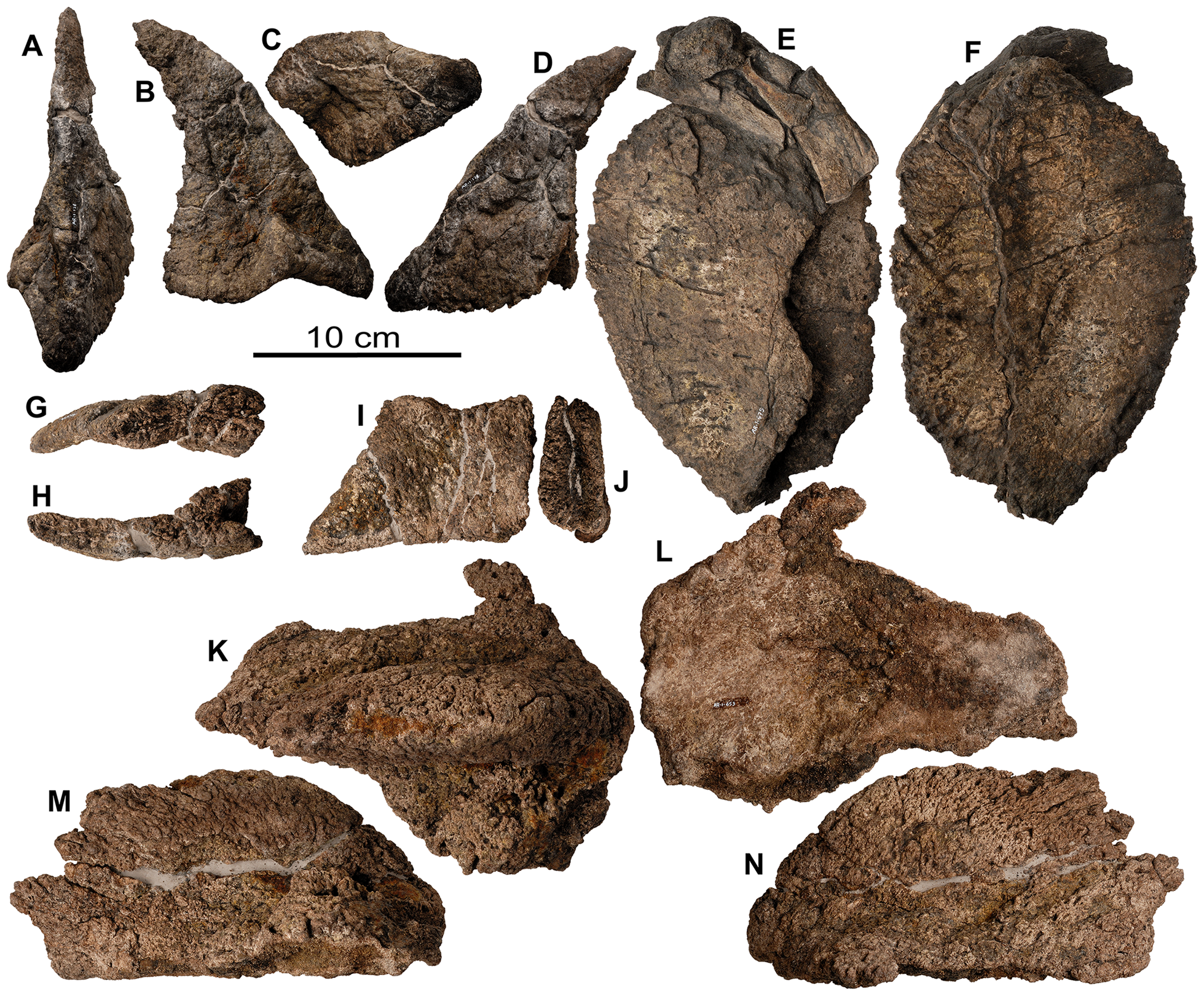
Larger osteoderms of holotype.

Both the holotype and paratype specimen of Europelta were preserved with an abundance of osteoderms but weren't preserved in situ with any of the skeletal elements or with each other. The osteoderms of Europelta have a moderately rugose texture with sparse pitting as in nodosaurids and basal ankylosaurids. No portions of cervical half-rings were recovered and may have been lost through the process of coal removal or were taphonomically removed.

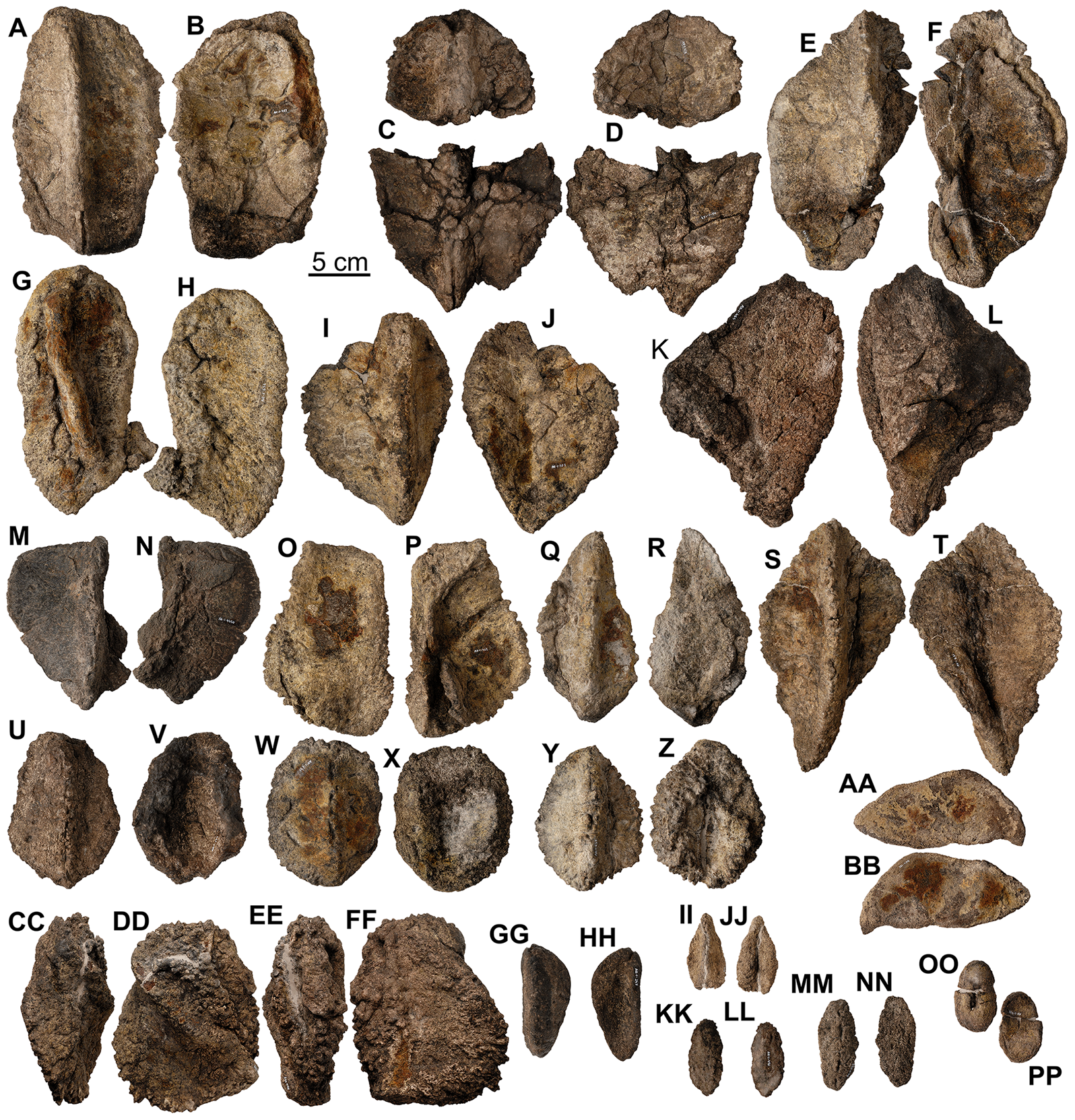
Dorsal osteoderms of holotype.

A spine from the cervical or pectoral region is represented only by the anterior half. The spine has an asymmetric, Y-shaped cross-section and has a base that flares more than a Type 2 caudal plate, suggesting that the spine was positioned on a broad flank of the body. Osteoderms with sharp anterior and posterior edges, and are hollow, asymmetric-based plate-like ran down the sides of the tail but decreased in size more rapidly. These osteoderms were similar to those of Mymoorapelta, Gargoyleosaurus, Gastonia and Polacanthus. Subrectangular to subtrapezoidal, solid osteoderms preserved in the holotype and paratype specimen are similar to the medial cervical osteoderms of half-rings and the mid-line of the pectoral region. These osteoderms have a low, evenly developed keel running down the long axis. Asymmetric, diamond to tear-drop shaped osteoderms are also found in both specimens and would have been in oblique rows anterior to the sacrum based on close relatives. The trunk of the body and the sides of the tail were covered in moderately asymmetric osteoderms. Medium to large oval to circular osteoderms were probably present on the posterior portion of the sacrum or within more expansive spaces among the larger dorsal armour. These osteoderms could have also lie on the tail between the caudal plate-like osteoderms or the side of the limbs. Flat, oval to subtriangular osteoderms that measure 12 cm long and 7 cm wide were present on the forelimbs based on the position of similar osteoderms in Sauropelta. Small ossicles that ranged in shape probably filled in the spaces between larger osteoderms. These ossicles appear to be present in many ankylosaur taxa such as Sauropelta, Gastonia and Tarchia. The posterior margin of the ilium preserves large, subequal-sized osteoderms that are tightly sutured together but was not coossified as in Aletopelta. An osteoderm with a large, posteriorly curved, plate-like keel may have been closely appressed to the more anterior portion of the ilium based on the gently convex and smooth base.

== Phylogeny ==
Kirkland et al. (2013) originally classified Europelta as a member of Struthiosaurinae but did not conduct a phylogenetic analysis to determine its exact relationships within the clade. Kirkland et al. considered Europelta to be the earliest member of the European clade. They noted that its appearance paralleled a comparable co-eval succession of polacanthids by nodosaurids in North America. They suggested that this was not a coincidence but an indication that the fauna of North America and Europe had not yet been separated by the developing northern Atlantic Ocean, as had been presumed earlier. Arbour et al. (2016) placed Europelta as sister taxon to Pawpawsaurus, while Brown et al. (2017) recovered it as sister taxon to both Pawpawsaurus and Borealopelta. However, Zheng et al. (2018) recovered it in a polytomy with Struthiosaurus, Stegopelta, Hungarosaurus and Pawpawsaurus. Rivera-Sylva et al. (2018) placed Europelta as sister taxon to Hungarosaurus.

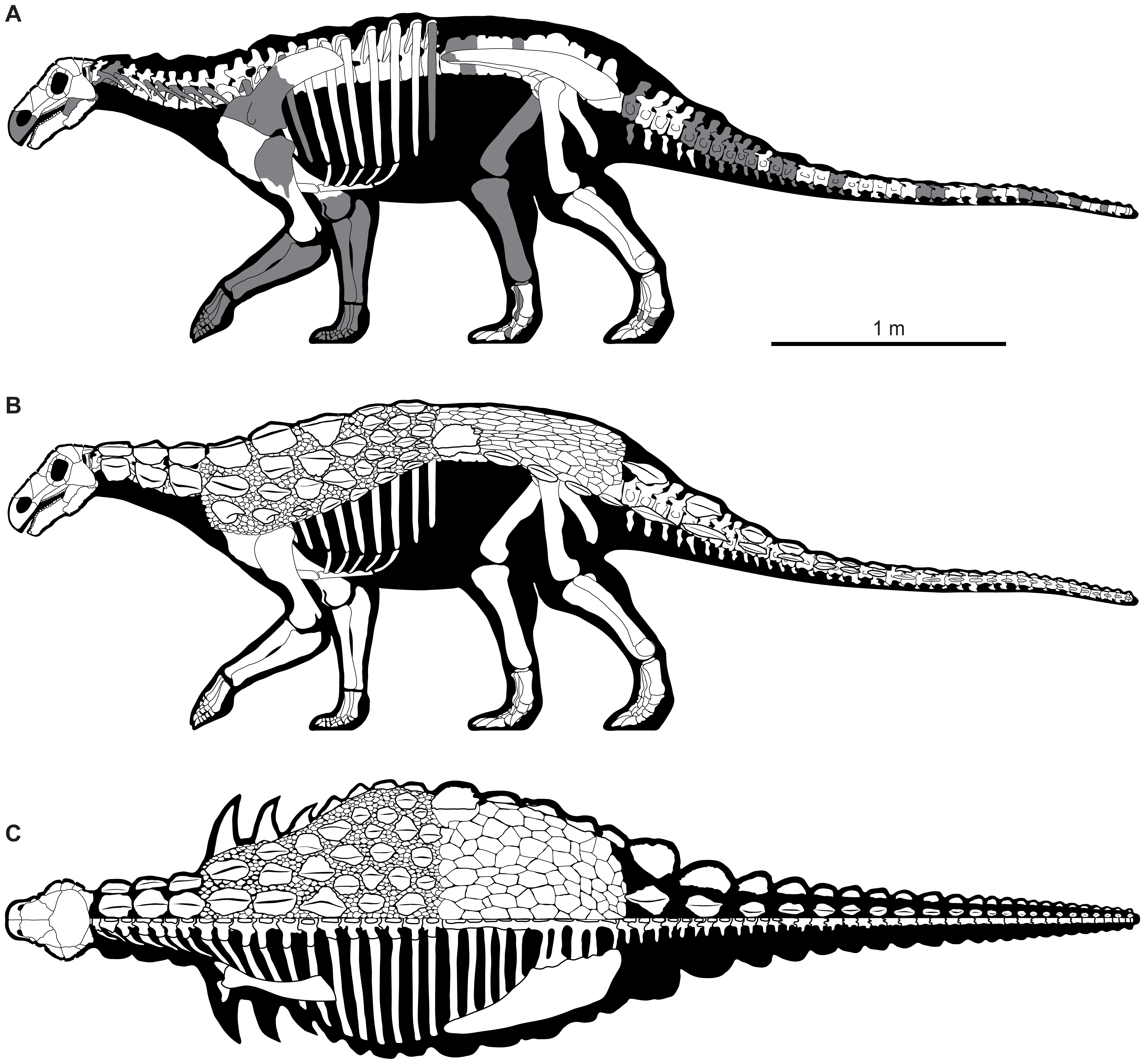
Skeletal reconstruction of Europelta.

A phylogenetic analysis conducted by Rivera-Sylva et al. (2018) and modified by Madzia et al. (2021) is reproduced below.

- Nodosauridae
  - - Sauroplites
    - Mymoorapelta
    - Dongyangopelta
  - - Gastonia
    - - Gargoyleosaurus
      - - Polacanthinae
          - Hoplitosaurus
          - Polacanthus
        - Nodosaurinae
          - Peloroplites
          - - Taohelong
            - Sauropelta
            - - Acantholipan
              - Nodosaurus
              - - Niobrarasaurus
                - Ahshislepelta
              - - Tatankacephalus
                - - Silvisaurus
                  - - CPC 273
                    - - Panoplosaurini
                        - Animantarx
                        - - Panoplosaurus
                          - - Argentinian ankylosaur
                            - Texasetes
                            - Denversaurus
                            - Edmontonia longiceps
                            - Edmontonia rugosidens
                      - Struthiosaurini
                        - - Hungarosaurus
                          - Europelta
                        - - Pawpawsaurus
                          - Stegopelta
                          - Struthiosaurus languedocensis
                          - - Struthiosaurus transylvanicus
                            - Struthiosaurus austriacus

== Paleoenvironment ==
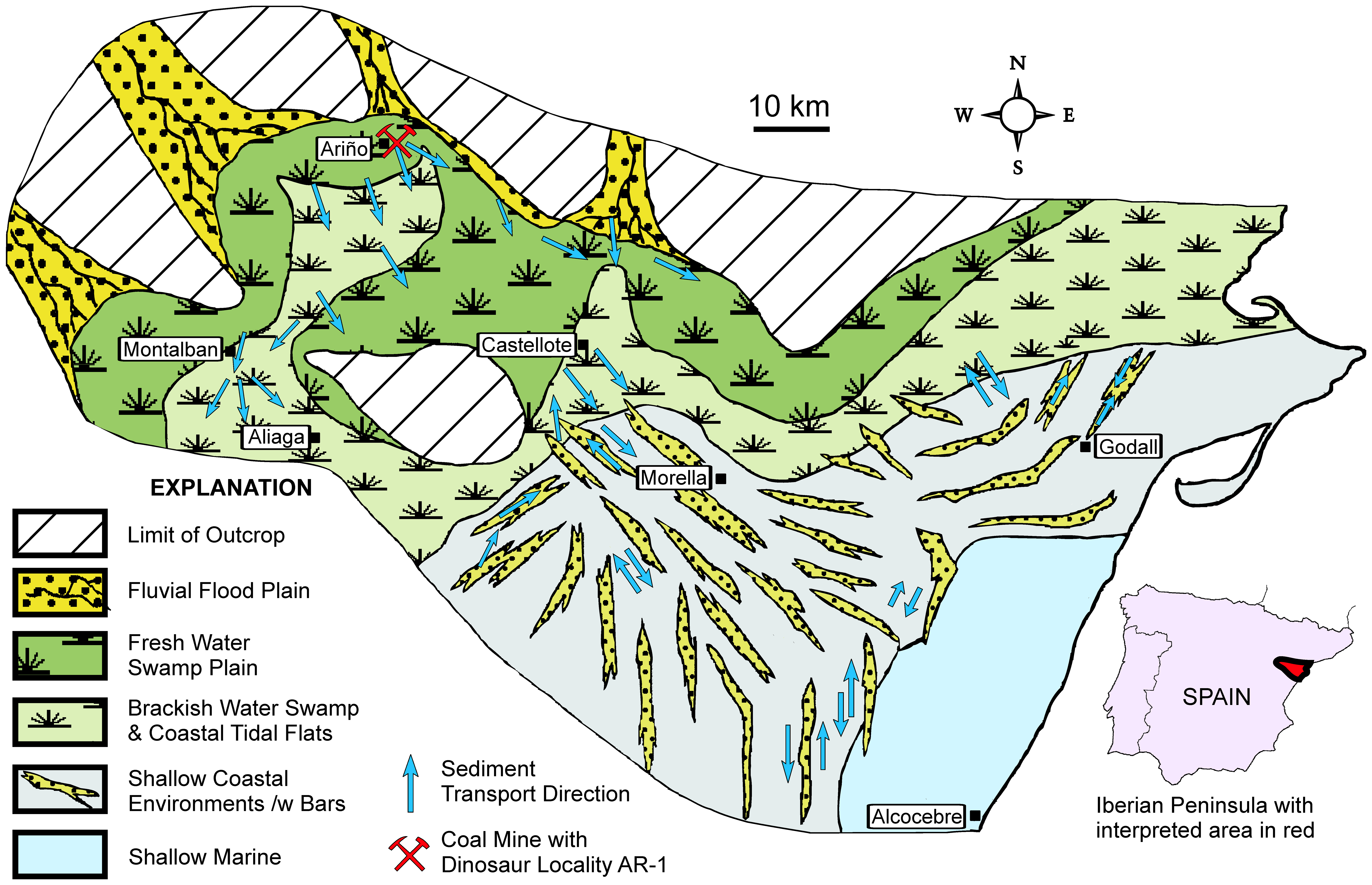
Paleogeographic reconstruction of the Escucha outcrop belt.

Europelta is known from a carbonaceous member of the Escucha Formation which dates to the early Albian stage of the Early Cretaceous. The microfossil assemblage of the member exclusively consists of freshwater ostracods and charophytes which suggests that the member was a permanent lacustrine. Due to the absence of arenaceous foraminifera and dinoflagellates, the member was formed well inland of marine and brackish water influences. The layer that the holotype and paratype specimens of Europelta were obtained from have a characteristic dark olive-gray to olive-black mudstone that preserves a high percentage of fossil plant debris. The layer, designated as AR-1, contains more than 5000 vertebrate specimens that are recovered from isolated remains and associated individual animals. The Escucha Formation was inhabited by various species of ostheicthyians, freshwater bivalves, gastropods, arthropods, turtles, and crocodylomorphs such as Hulkepholis, Anteophthalmosuchus and an indeterminate goniopholidid. The remains of the ornithopod Proa were also recovered from the formation.

The middle member of the Escucha Formation, which represents a freshwater swamp plain, preserves the charcoalified remains of the matoniaceous ferns Weichselia and Phlebopteris along with some gymnosperm wood remains. Similar assemblages of charcoalified ferns have been recorded in several localities from England that represent fluvial to lacustrine deposits of Hauterivian to Barremian age. The presence of fused lamella in charred remains of ferns and the presence of abundant macro- and meso-charcoal remains together with a great amount of micro-charcoal indicates that the assemblage was affected by a wildfire. This taphonomic plant assemblage indicates the action of a local fire over the vegetation growing in a nearby fluvial plain. The combination of the properties of the burnt soil and the action of heavy rainfalls suggests the charred remains moved downstream and were buried later in a near depositional area.

== See also ==
- Timeline of ankylosaur research
