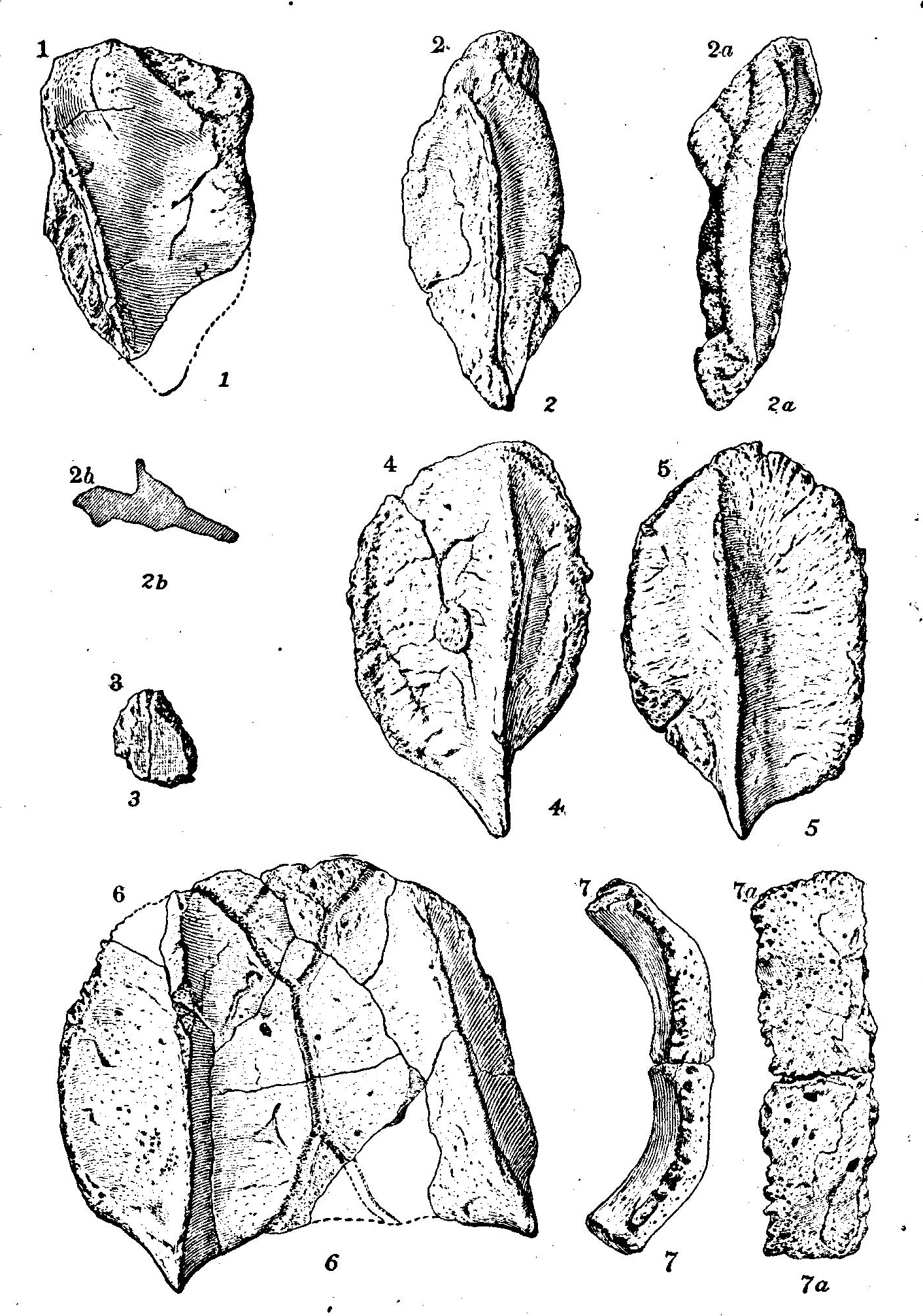
- Holotype

Scientific classification
- Kingdom: Animalia
- Phylum: Chordata
- Class: Reptilia
- Clade: Dinosauria
- Clade: †Ornithischia
- Clade: †Thyreophora
- Clade: †Ankylosauria
- Clade: †Euankylosauria
- Family: †Nodosauridae
- Genus: †Hierosaurus; Wieland, 1909
- Species: †H. sternbergii

Binomial name
- †Hierosaurus sternbergii Wieland, 1909

= Hierosaurus =

Hierosaurus Temporal range: Late Cretaceous, 87–82 Ma

Extinct genus of reptiles

Hierosaurus (meaning "sacred lizard") is an extinct genus of ankylosaur which lived during the Late Cretaceous 87 to 82 million years ago. Its fossils were found in the Smoky Hill Chalk Member of the Niobrara Formation, in western Kansas, which would have been near the middle of the Western Interior Sea during the Late Cretaceous. It was likely a nodosaurid.

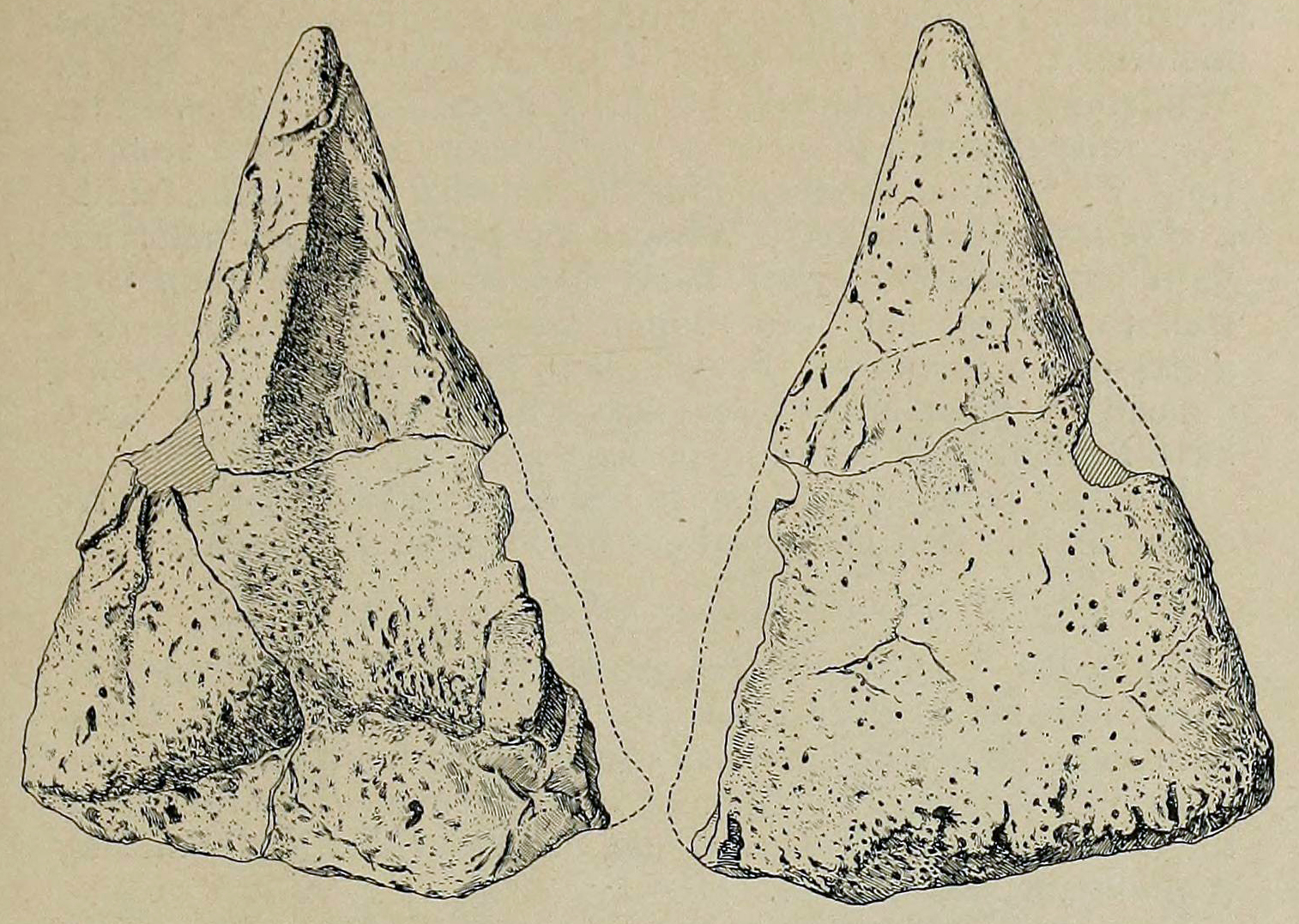
Spine

The only species of this genus, Hierosaurus sternbergii, was described by George Wieland on the basis of cranial and postcranial osteoderms collected by Charles Hazelius Sternberg in the Niobrara Formation of western Kansas. Hierosaurus is now considered a nomen dubium, and a second species, H. coleii, was reassigned to the new genus Niobrarasaurus in 1995.

== See also ==
- Timeline of ankylosaur research
