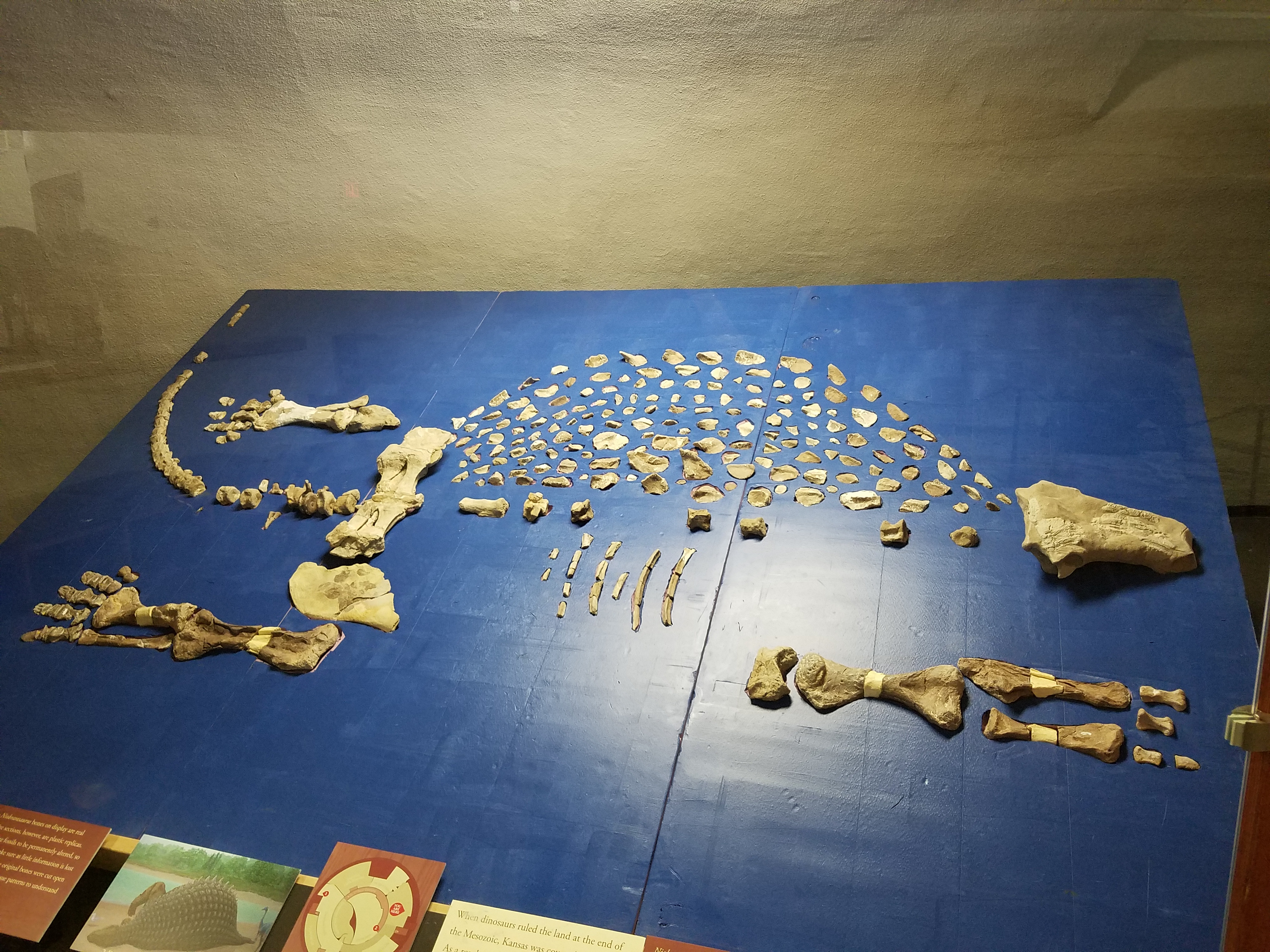
- Holotype skeleton on display at the Sternberg Museum of Natural History in Hays, Kansas

Scientific classification
- Kingdom: Animalia
- Phylum: Chordata
- Class: Reptilia
- Clade: Dinosauria
- Clade: †Ornithischia
- Clade: †Thyreophora
- Clade: †Ankylosauria
- Family: †Nodosauridae
- Subfamily: †Nodosaurinae
- Genus: †Niobrarasaurus; Carpenter et al., 1995
- Species: †N. coleii

Binomial name
- †Niobrarasaurus coleii (Mehl, 1936)

Synonyms
- Hierosaurus coleii Mehl, 1936; Nodosaurus coleii (Mehl, 1936) Vickaryous et al., 2004

= Niobrarasaurus =

Niobrarasaurus Temporal range: Late Cretaceous, 87–82 Ma

Genus of nodosaurid dinosaur from the Early Cretaceous period

Niobrarasaurus (meaning "Niobrara lizard") is an extinct genus of nodosaurid ankylosaurian dinosaur which lived during the Late Cretaceous, around 87 to 82 million years ago. Its fossils were found in the Smoky Hill Chalk Member of the Niobrara Formation, in western Kansas, which would have been near the middle of the Western Interior Seaway during the Late Cretaceous. It was probably closely related to Nodosaurus.

The type species, Niobrarasaurus coleii, was discovered and collected in 1930 by geologist Virgil Cole. It was originally described by Mehl in 1936 and named as a species of Hierosaurus. It was then re-described as a new genus by Carpenter et al. in 1995. In 2002 the type specimen was transferred to the Sternberg Museum of Natural History, Hays, Kansas. It has been estimated at 5 metres (16 ft) in length and around 227–453 kilograms (500–999 lb) in body mass according to Thomas Holtz. Paul gave a higher estimation of 6.5 metres (21 ft) and 4 tonnes (4.4 short tons).

== Discovery and naming ==
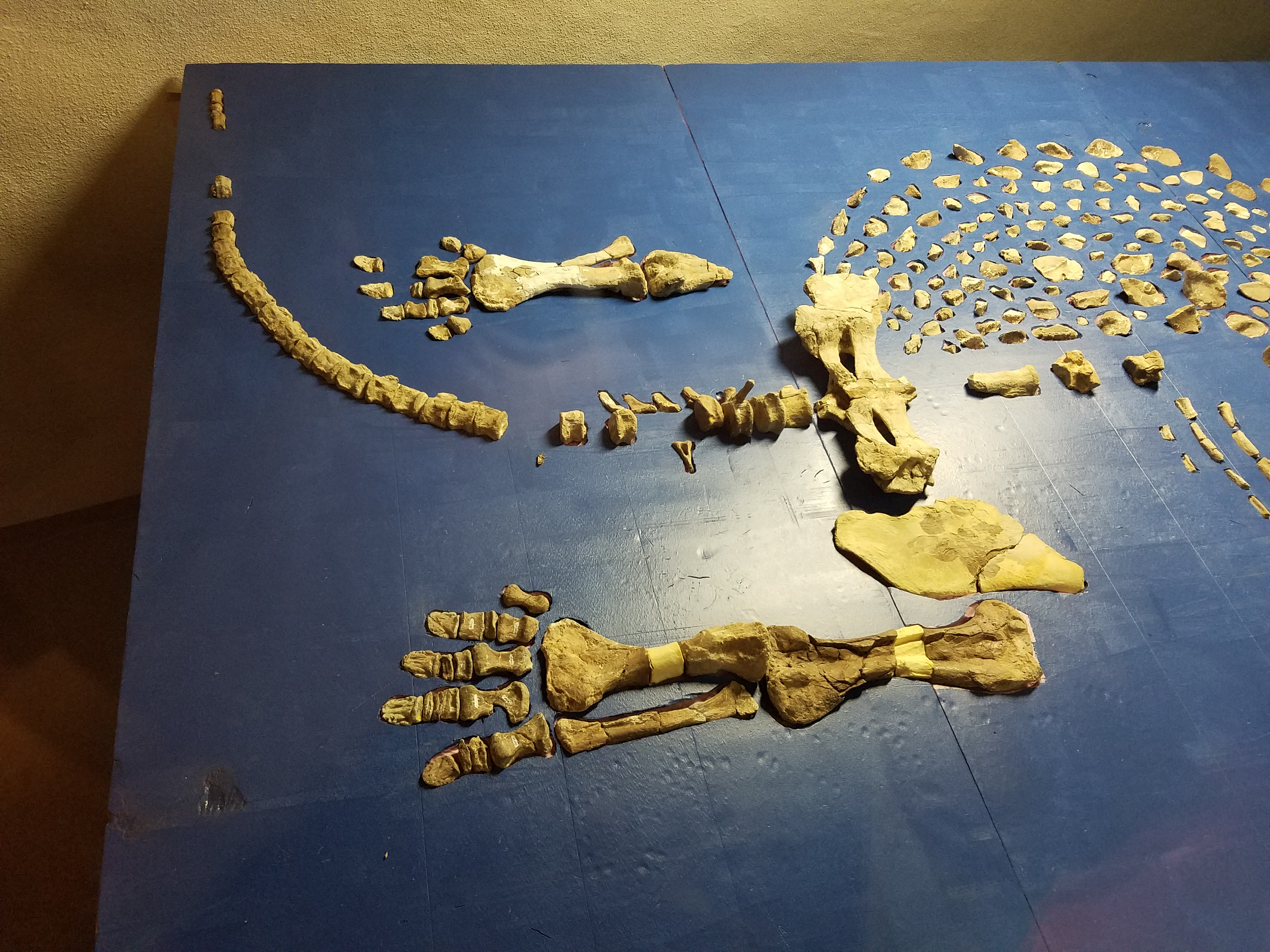
Rear portion of the skeleton

The first remains of dinosaurs were discovered in the Niobrara Formation of Kansas by the excavations of American paleontologist Othniel Charles Marsh, who worked in the area from 1870 to 1872. The first of these dinosaur remains were collected and returned to the Yale Peabody Museum where they were named Hadrosaurus agilis by Marsh in 1872, before being given the generic name Claosaurus in 1890. An ankylosaur was then discovered in 1905 by Canadian paleontologist Charles H. Sternberg, though they were originally identified as the scutes of a turtle. These scutes, and additional material of the skeleton, were identified as the remains of an ankylosaur by American paleontologist George Wieland, who named them Hierosaurus sternbergii in 1909. The third discovery of dinosaurs in the Niobrara were found in the spring of 1930, where Virgil B. Cole excavated a large collection of bones and fragments, which were sent to the University of Missouri and accessioned as MU 650 VP. Cole wrote to American paleontologist Maurice Mehl about the finds on 25 February 1930, where he described the discovery as a baby due to its small size. Many portions of the skeleton were articulated, and while most was weathered and broken into pieces, the ability to reassemble fragments led Mehl to believe that missing portions were scattered before burial.

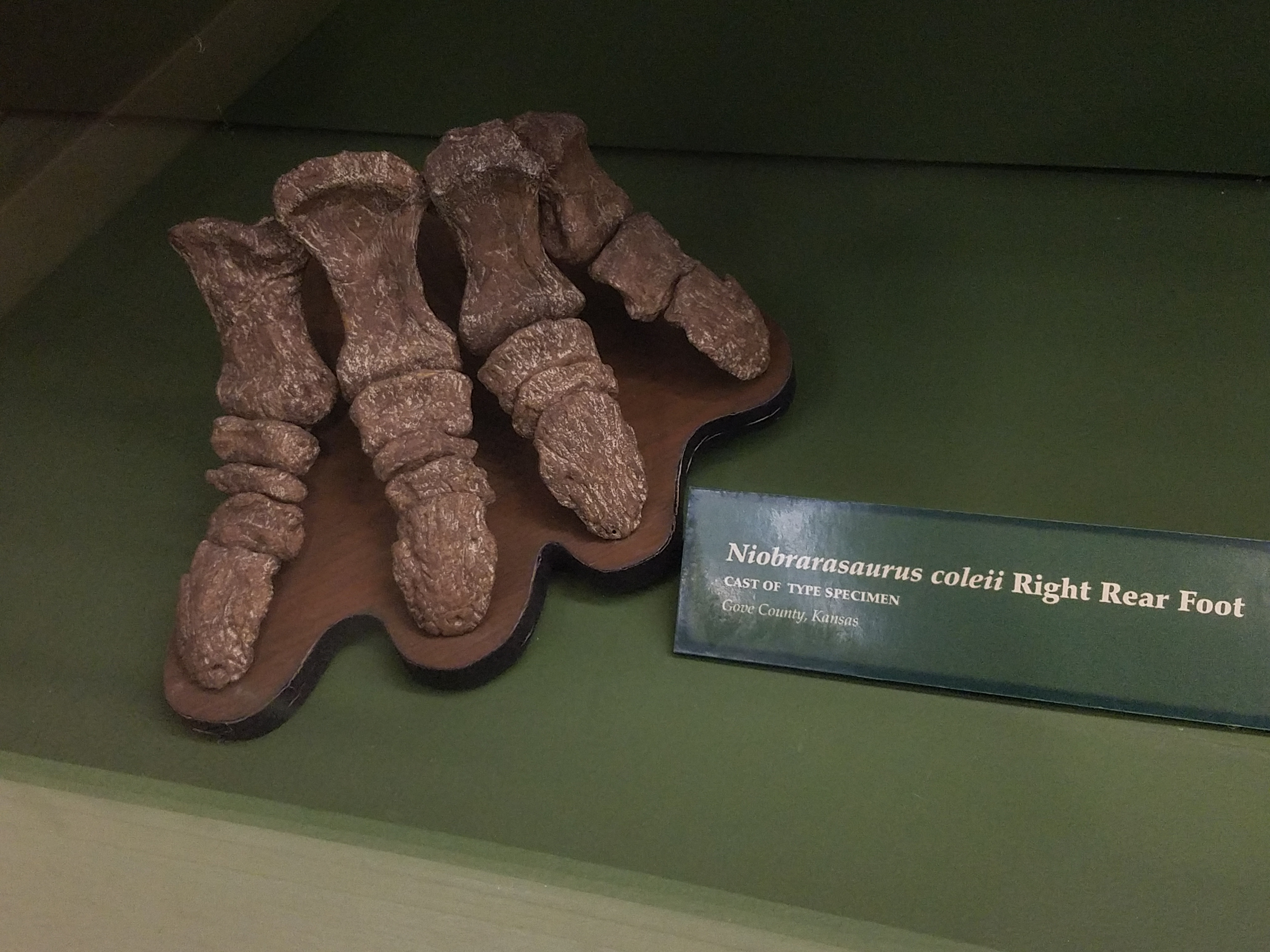
Foot replica

The skeleton of MU 650 VP includes most of the skeleton and armor, with parts of the skull and teeth, vertebrae from the cervical, dorsal, sacral, and caudal regions and their ribs, parts of the scapula and ilium, and bones from the forelimb and hindlimb. It was discovered in Gove County, around 11 mi (18 km) south of Hackberry, Kansas, around 195 ft (59 m) above the base of the Niobrara Formation within the Smoky Hill Chalk Member. When originally described, Mehl considered the material to represent a new species of ankylosaur, giving it the name Hierosaurus coleii. It was referred only tentatively to Hierosaurus, as while there were both similarities and differences between the two species of the genus, until additional material of ankylosaur showing clearly that more than one genus was present within the Niobrara Formation, considering all ankylosaurs from to represent a single genus was advisable. Revisions of the ankylosaurs by American paleontologist Walter P. Coombs found Hierosaurus to be either an undiagnostic nodosaurid or a junior synonym of Nodosaurus, with his 1971 thesis renaming H. coleii as "Nodosaurus coleii" as H. sternbergii was considered dubious, and his 1978 revision of ankylosaur families simply listing Hierosaurus as a synonym of Nodosaurus. Coombs and Polish paleontologist Teresa Maryańska then considered Hierosaurus coleii to be a junior synonym of Nodosaurus textilis in 1990, with H. sternbergii as a dubious taxon. American paleontologist Kenneth Carpenter and colleagues reviewed Hierosaurus in 1995, finding the type species H. sternbergii to be a dubious taxon based on inadequate material. As H. coleii was diagnostic, and lacked any features unique to it and Nodosaurus, Carpenter and colleagues named the new genus Niobrarasaurus for the species, with the genus named after the Niobrara Formation it was found in.

== See also ==
- Timeline of ankylosaur research
