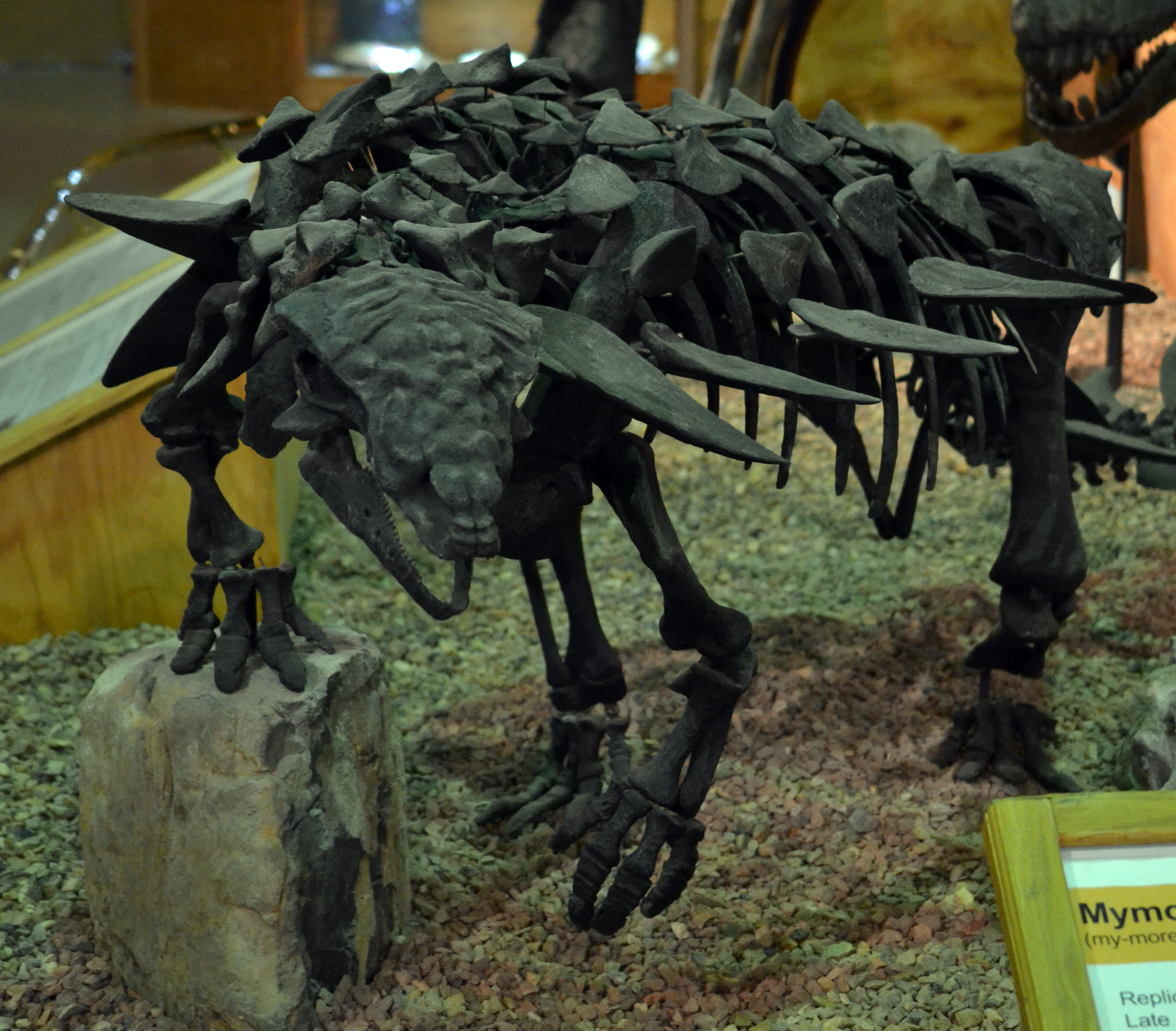
- Reconstructed skeleton in Wyoming Dinosaur Center

Scientific classification
- Kingdom: Animalia
- Phylum: Chordata
- Class: Reptilia
- Clade: Dinosauria
- Clade: †Ornithischia
- Clade: †Thyreophora
- Clade: †Ankylosauria
- Clade: †Euankylosauria
- Family: †Nodosauridae
- Genus: †Mymoorapelta; Kirkland et Carpenter, 1994

Type species
- †Mymoorapelta maysi Kirkland and Carpenter, 1994

= Mymoorapelta =

Mymoorapelta Temporal range: Late Jurassic, 155–150 Ma

Extinct genus of ornithischian dinosaur

Mymoorapelta (Meaning "Shield from the Mygatt-Moore Quarry" after a combination of the names of the discoverers of the Mygatt-Moore Quarry that fossils were originally collected from, and the Greek word πέλτα, meaning "shield") is a nodosaurid ankylosaur from the Late Jurassic (Kimmeridgian-Tithonian, around 155 to 150 million years ago) Morrison Formation (Brushy Basin Member) of western Colorado and central Utah, USA. The animal is known from a single species, Mymoorapelta maysi, and few specimens are known. The most complete specimen is the holotype individual from the Mygatt-Moore Quarry, which includes osteoderms, a partial skull, vertebrae, and other bones. It was initially described by James Kirkland and Kenneth Carpenter in 1994. Along with Gargoyleosaurus, it is one of the earliest known nodosaurids.

Mymoorapelta is one of the smaller known nodosaurids, with the estimated length of the largest specimen only reaching 3 metres (9.8 ft). It had a narrow snout and almost triangular skull in dorsal view, with two large horns pointing backwards from the brow and two horns below these that pointed backwards and down on the jugal. Five different armor types have been observed in Mymoorapelta, ranging from elongated, sharp spines on the side of the body to a giant sacral shield composed of tiny osteoderms, called ossicles, that covered the top of the pelvis. In contrast to the club-tailed ankylosaurids, the tail bore spikes that Mymoorapelta likely used for defense.

Mymoorapelta was a low browser in the Morrison ecosystem, feeding on cycads and conifers, in contrast to the high-browsing Apatosaurus known from the same quarries. Other dinosaur groups were also present, including the large theropods Allosaurus and Ceratosaurus and possibly the ornithischian Nanosaurus. Both of the theropods have also been found in association with the animal, and we have evidence that the former preyed on Mymoorapelta.

== Discovery and naming ==
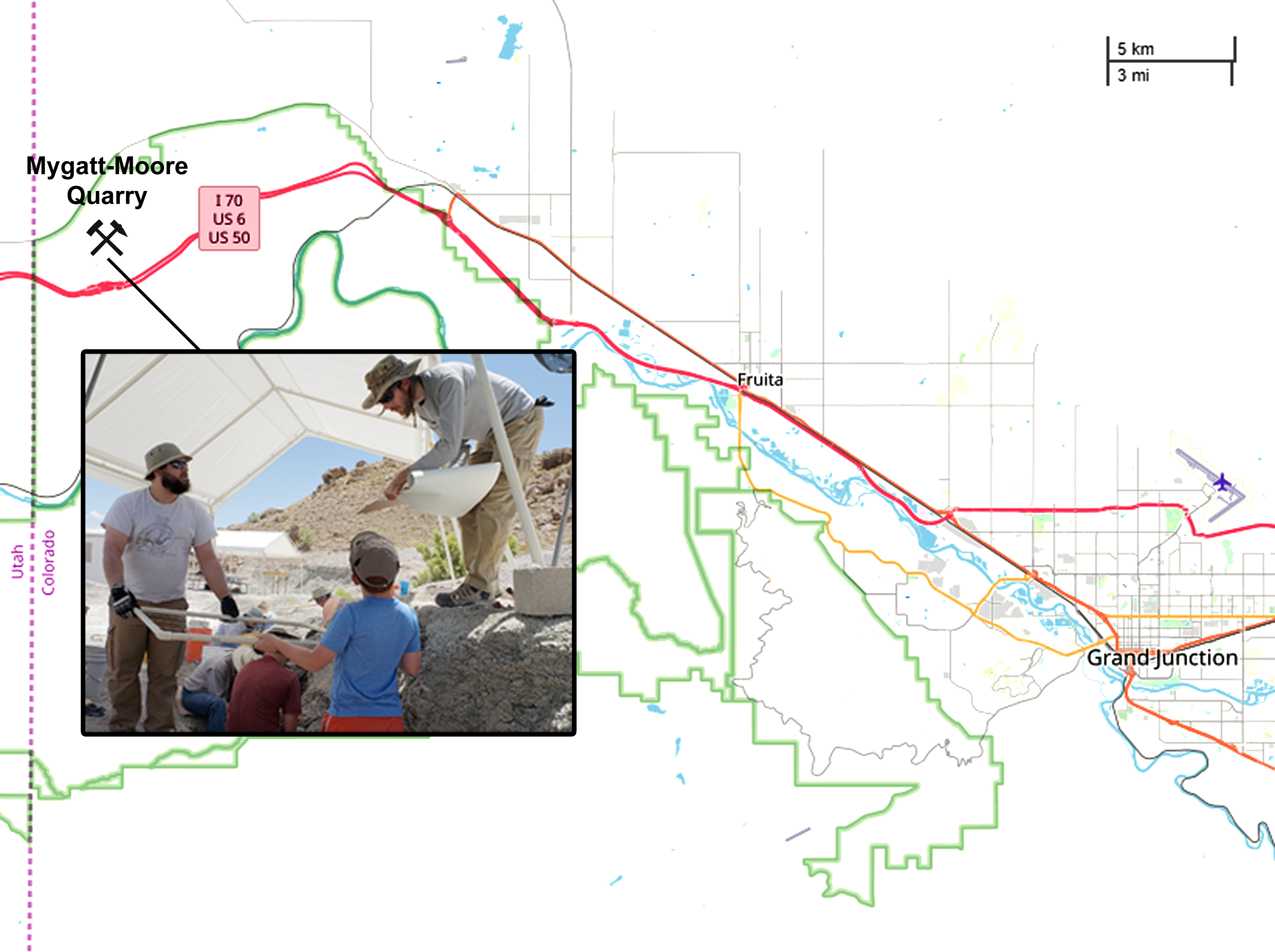
Map of the location of Mygatt-Moore Quarry, where Mymoorapelta fossils were first discovered.

=== Original discovery ===
The Mygatt-Moore Quarry was first discovered in March 1981 by hikers JD and Vanetta Moore and Pete and Marilyn Mygatt in Mesa County, west-central Colorado. The quarry's strata come from the Brushy Basin Member of the Morrison Formation, which dates to the Upper Jurassic. Fossils of Mymoorapelta were first discovered in the quarry in 1990, and since then over 160 elements have been found scattered over 25 metres (27 yd) of the 150-square-metre (1,600 sq ft) quarry. A few of these elements are part of a single adult individual and were described by American paleontologists James Kirkland and Kenneth Carpenter in 1994. This specimen (MWC 1815) would be designated the holotype of the species and includes a left ilium (hip bone) with preserved bitemarks. Kirkland and Carpenter named the species Mymoorapelta maysi, the generic name deriving from the names of Marilyn Mygatt and the Moores, who had discovered the quarry, and the Greek root pelta, meaning "shield", due to the preserved armor. The specific name is after Chris Mays, the president of the Dinamation International Corporation and Society, who funded the initial excavation of the Mygatt-Moore Quarry. Mymoorapelta was the first Jurassic ankylosaur named from North America, with the closely related Gargoyleosaurus being named four years later in 1998. Other parts of the type specimen that were excavated from the quarry include several dorsal (back) and caudal (tail) vertebrae, ribs, isolated limb bones, and many osteoderms, including the signature triangular cervical spine of basal ankylosaurs. Some osteoderms which have been found in the quarry and referred to Mymoorapelta come from a higher stratigraphic layer, suggesting that a second individual is preserved.

=== Later finds ===
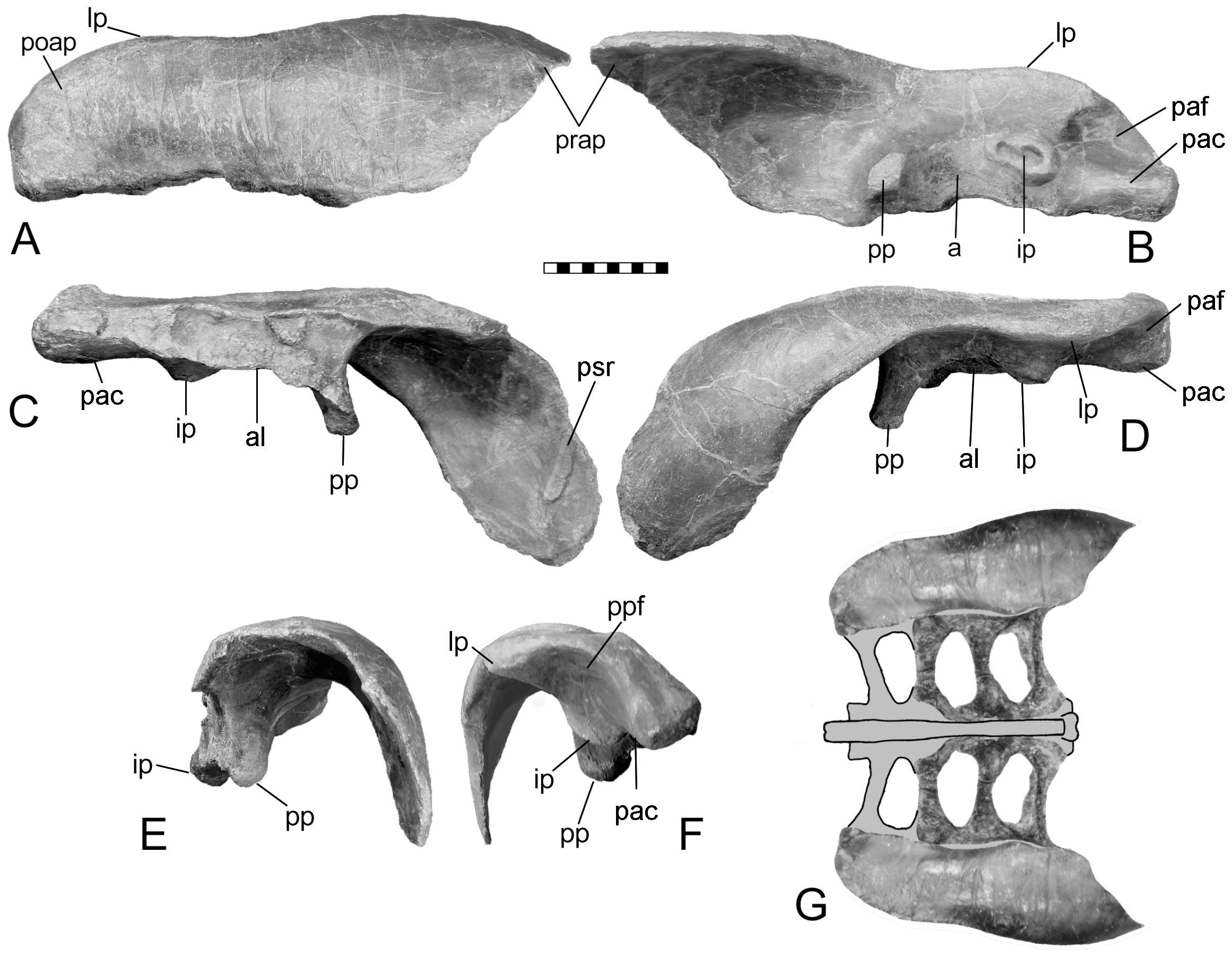
Left ilium of the holotype (MWC 1815)

In 1998, a partial skeleton referred to Mymoorapelta was described by Kirkland et al from Cactus Park, Colorado, though at the time the fossil was still undergoing fossil preparation. The skeleton preserved natural molds and body fossils of the sacrum, caudal vertebrae, chevrons (bones attached to the underside of the tail vertebrae in dinosaurs), pes (foot), and many pieces of the dermal armor, including parts of the sacral shield, which was a type of armor that would cover the top of the pelvis. Though skull material was mentioned to be preserved it is still in preparation and undescribed. Some of the material, namely from the pes and sacral shield, was preserved in articulation making it the only known articulated specimen of the taxon. In a 2010 abstract, Kirkland and colleagues mentioned the discovery of many more elements of Mymoorapelta at Mygatt-Moore Quarry including a nearly complete skull and every postcranial element except the pubis and femur. All of the fossils found at Mygatt-Moore Quarry and Cactus Park are currently deposited in the Dinosaur Journey Museum of Western Colorado in Fruita.

2015 saw the presentation of an abstract by Katie Tremaine et al that mentions a new Mymoorapelta specimen unearthed at Hanksville-Burpee Quarry near Hanksville, Utah. The specimen includes one individual preserving: 24 osteoderms, three ribs, one vertebra, and a femur, though more material has yet to be excavated. The discovery of a single, dorsal osteoderm that had been collected from the Peterson Quarry outside of Albuquerque, New Mexico was described in 2016. The osteoderm is morphologically (based on external anatomy) similar to Mymoorapelta, however it is stratigraphically (based on rock layers) closer to Gargoyleosaurus.

== Description ==
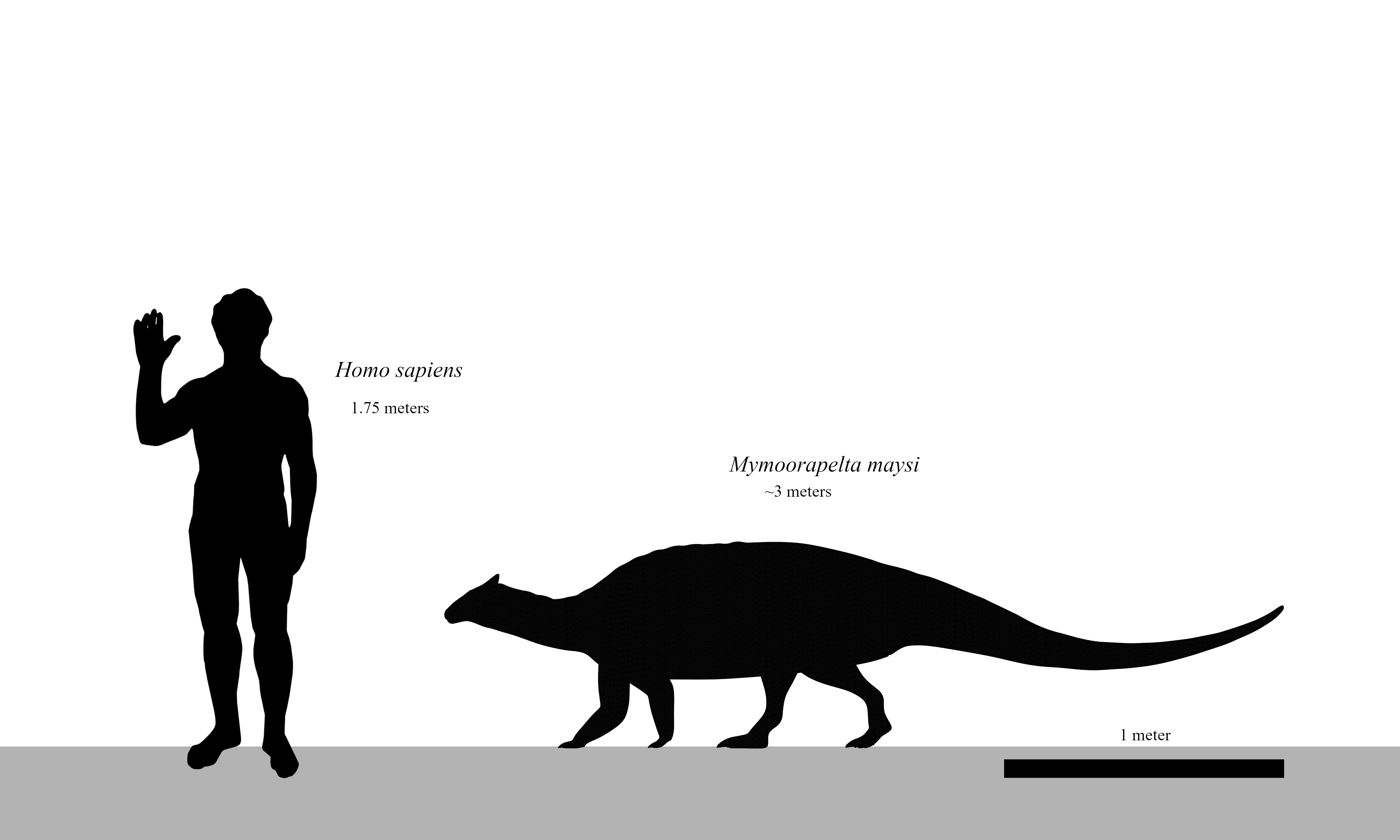
Diagram illustrating the size of Mymoorapelta.

Mymoorapelta is one of the smallest ankylosaurs known and the smallest known quadrupedal dinosaur from the Morrison Formation. However, few individuals have been found and only a portion of the known material has been described in detail. The Cactus Park specimen is the largest described individual, with its length being estimated at 3 metres (9.8 ft) long in 1998. Body mass estimates based on the type specimen give a weight of around 300–562 kilograms (661–1,239 lb).

=== Skull and dentition ===
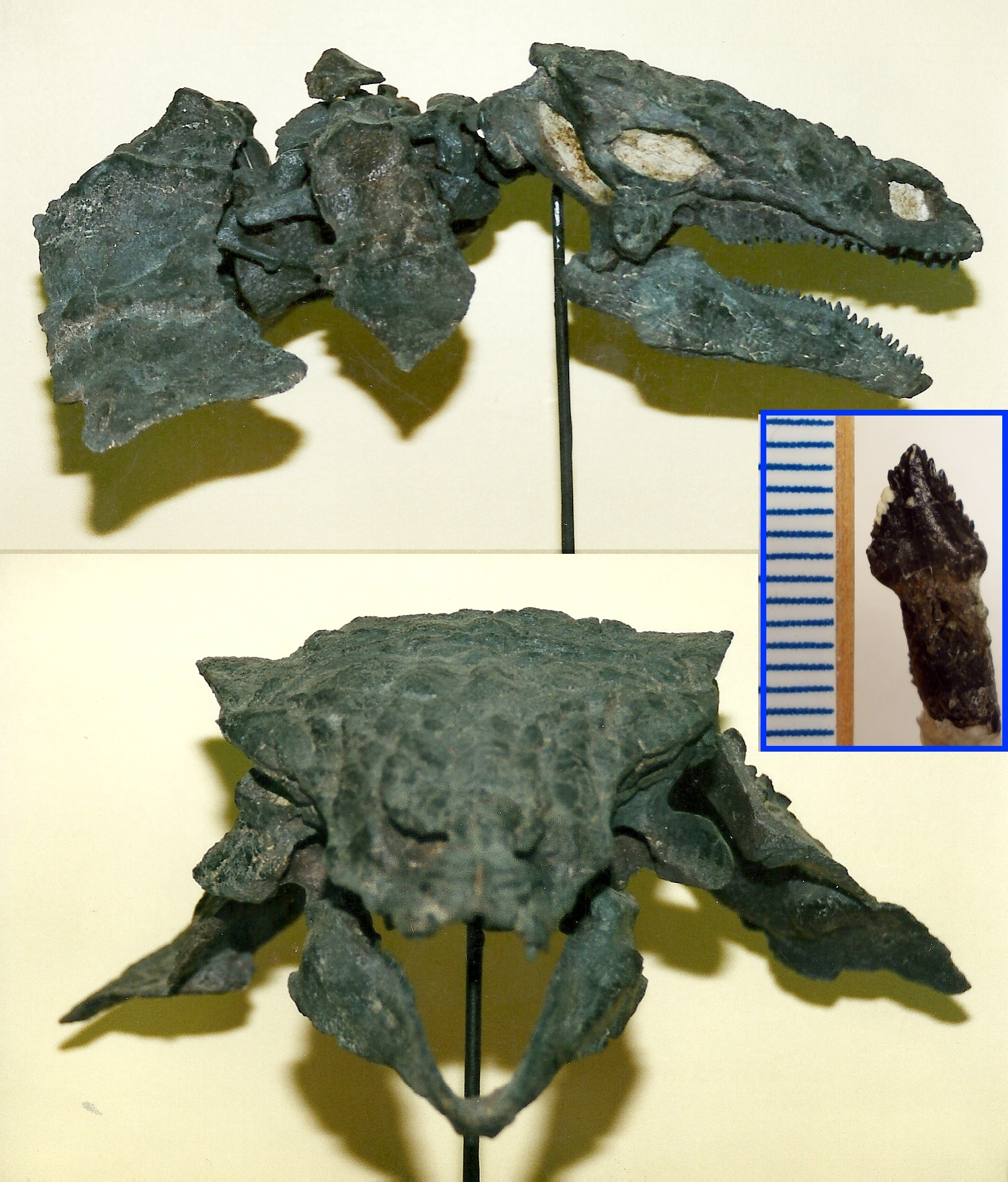
Skull of the similar Gargoyleosaurus, also from the Morrison Formation.

The skull specifically has not been described in detail, but the preserved morphology (external anatomy) is very similar to that of Gargoyleosaurus, which also hails from the Morrison Formation. It had a narrow snout and almost triangular shaped skull in dorsal (top) view, with two large horns pointing backward from the back of the brow, and two horns below these that pointed backward and down from the jugal (cheek bone). A preserved jugal described in 1998 has a wedge-shaped, armored morphology and projects ventrolaterally (down and outwards) like in ankylosaurids. The premaxillae (bones at the tip of the snout) probably possessed a narrow, toothed, and trapezoidal muzzle like in Gargoyleosaurus. In the back of the skull, the quadrate-articular area (place of contact between the skull and lower jaw) faces slightly medially (towards the midline of the body), and is subtly lengthened anteroposteriorly (front to back). The distal surface of the quadrate, especially on the medial condyle, is robust and elongated anteroposteriorly. In all ankylosaurs, the jaw joint (joint connecting the skull to the jaw bone) is placed ventrally to the occlusal plane (contact surface between teeth). The coronoid process (bony projection on the lower jaw) is very well developed in nodosaurids, and the jaw joint is well depressed in turn, which corresponds to a higher relative bite force.

Most ankylosaurs have heterodont dentition (variation in tooth morphology), but not in Gargoyleosaurus, which shows only subtle morphological differences in the premaxillary, maxillary, and dentary teeth. Ankylosaur teeth are compressed labiolingually and are phylliform (leaf-shaped), with an apical cusp and secondary cusps along the mesial and distal edges. Nodosaurid teeth are blade-like, larger, and usually more complex than the basic cusps of ankylosaurids, having a larger crown, a rough enamel surface, confluent fluting with grooves of the marginal cusps, and a crenelated cingulum (shelf-like bulge surrounding the base of a tooth crown). The wear facets on Ankylosaur teeth vary greatly, but in nodosaurids they are usually more extensive and steeply inclined than in ankylosaurids, demonstrating underlying patterns of shape-constrained function. In early nodosaurids like Gargoyleosaurus and Gastonia, the pterygoid (a dermal, paired bone of the palate) is not yet well developed anteroposteriorly and mediolaterally, but in later species they are much wider, with more robust lateral wings, and they are more expanded anteroposteriorly than in basal forms, reaching the level of the distal quadrate condyles. This suggests more developed pterygoid muscles in later nodosaurids than in ankylosaurids, reflecting a more efficient jaw adductor system in nodosaurids. The mandibular adductor chamber and the coronoid process are generally taller in nodosaurids than in ankylosaurs, suggesting differences in the size and attachment of muscles.

=== Postcranial skeleton ===
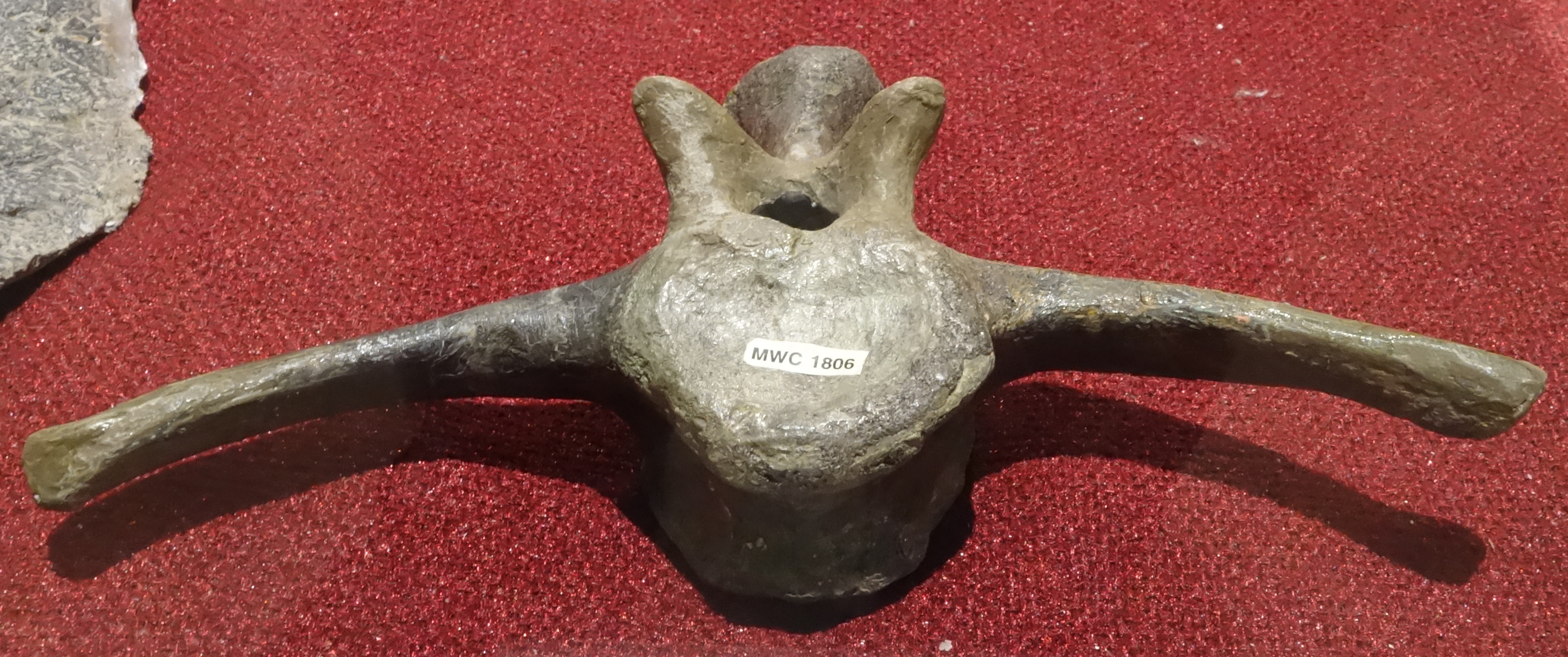
A dorsal vertebra in anterior view at the Dinosaur Journey Museum, Fruita.

A large part of the postcranial (behind the skull) skeleton of Mymoorapelta is known. For instance, many cervical vertebrae (vertebrae of the neck) are known, though many of them have not been fully researched or excavated. In the cervicals, the faces (ends) of the centra are wider than they are tall and display a heart-shaped morphology. The centra overall are anteroposteriorly short with lengths that are around equal to their width. The neural spines are short and thick, and possess round, circular neural canals. A deep, tear-shaped fossa (small opening in bone) is present between the postzygapophyses (backwards projections of the vertebral arch). Several dorsal (back, sometimes referred to as thoracic) vertebrae are known from Mymoorapelta, and they are unique when compared to those of Cretaceous nodosaurids. The centra are cylindrical, longer posteriorly, and less laterally compressed than those of other, later nodosaurids like Sauropelta and Dracopelta. The anterior dorsals are unique in that they bear a triangular pit between the prezygapophyses (forwards projections of the vertebral arch), which are also much more elongate at the anterior end of the vertebra. Meanwhile, the postzygapophyses are truncated at the posterior end, with the left and right postzygapophyses divided by a large groove. The mid dorsal vertebrae differ in that they are rounded ventrally and have a weak keel at the bottom. The transverse processes of the dorsal vertebrae do not ascend steeply and are instead gradually heightened, similar to the condition in basal ankylosaurs, and differing from that of nodosaurids. Mymoorapelta has 13 ribs, all of which have triangular cross-sections and a weak T-shape, in contrast to other ankylosaurs. Mymoorapelta is also one of the few ankylosaurs with 4 sacral ribs, a trait it shares with only 3 other taxa.

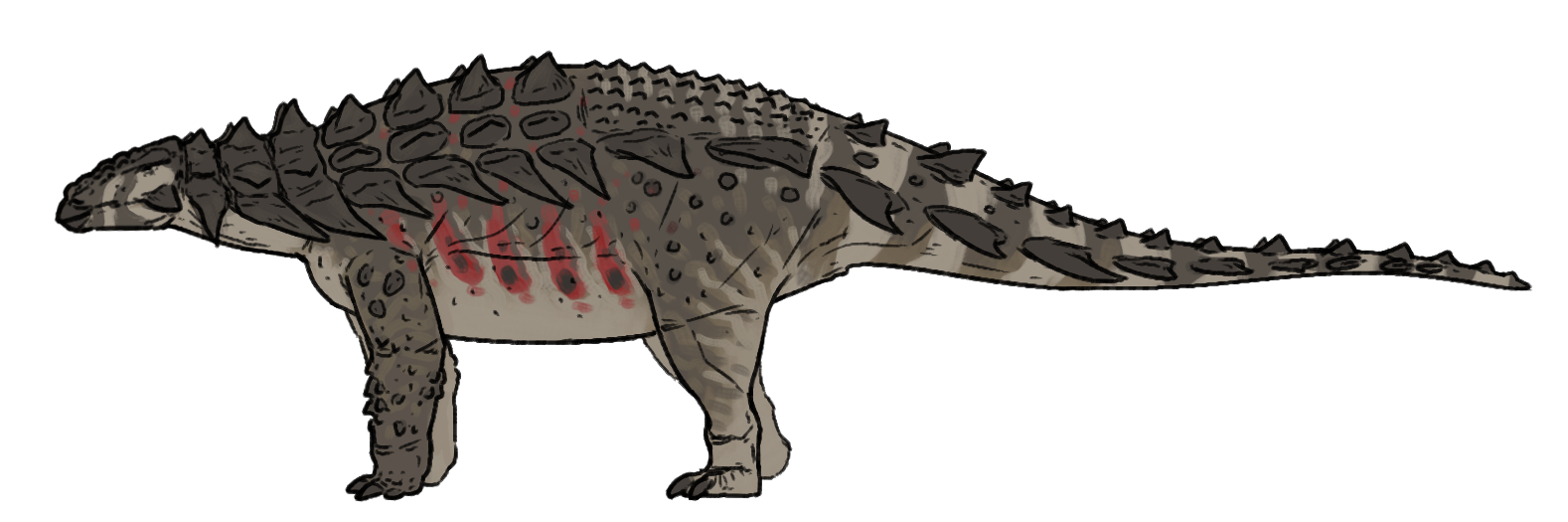
Life restoration

The caudal (tail) vertebrae of Mymoorapelta and other nodosaurids are longer than they are wide, and dorsoventrally (top-bottom) flattened with a reduction of the neural spines when compared to the anterior caudals. The haemal spine takes on a rounded, hatchet-shaped appearance. The prezygapophyses are short and extend past the anterior edge of the centra by only 25% or less. This trait is only present in nodosaurids and basal anklosaurs, but in taxa like Liaoningosaurus and more derived ankylosaurids they overlap by at least 50% of its length, making them more fused together. Mymoorapelta lacks tail club handles or tail club knobs, as in other nodosaurids, giving them less ankylosis. The transition from anterior to posterior caudal vertebrae is less abrupt compared to ankylosaurids, which have an abrupt transition at the midcaudals, the lack of this abrupt transition would give the tail more flexibility, which is unique to nodosaurids when compared to the strongly fused tails of ankylosaurids. The vertebral centra and neural spines are much shorter when compared to Gargoyleosaurus. Mymoorapelta, like other dinosaurs, preserves chevrons along the undersides of the caudal vertebrae, and just like in many other ankylosaurs, the chevrons are strongly fused to the lower posterior part of the centra, and the haemal arches extend parallel to the elongate vertebral centra. The extension of these arches is greater anteriorly than posteriorly, forming a continuous bony structure underneath the haemal canal. One of the preserved chevrons measures 9.1 centimetres (3.6 in) and is strongly recurved posteriorly.

The scapular spine forms a vertical ridge opposite the glenoid in Mymoorapelta, as in other ankylosaurids and in an indeterminate ankylosaur scapula found in the nearby Dry Mesa Quarry. In the pelvic region, Mymoorapelta displays an intermediate between some features of basal and more derived ankylosaurs. The ischium is bent as in other nodosaurids and polacanthines, indicating that a straight ischium is a derived feature in ankylosaurids. In the forelimbs, the ulna has a broad, massive olecranon process that preserves rugosities. The coronoid process develops about 1/3rd of the way down the ulna's shaft, compared to 1/4th of the way down in taxa like Stegopelta and Polacanthus. In the pes (foot), the genus preserves short, wide metapodials with long phalanges, with the distal phalanges looking triangular and pointed in side view, contrary to other nodosaurids like Edmontonia.

=== Armor ===
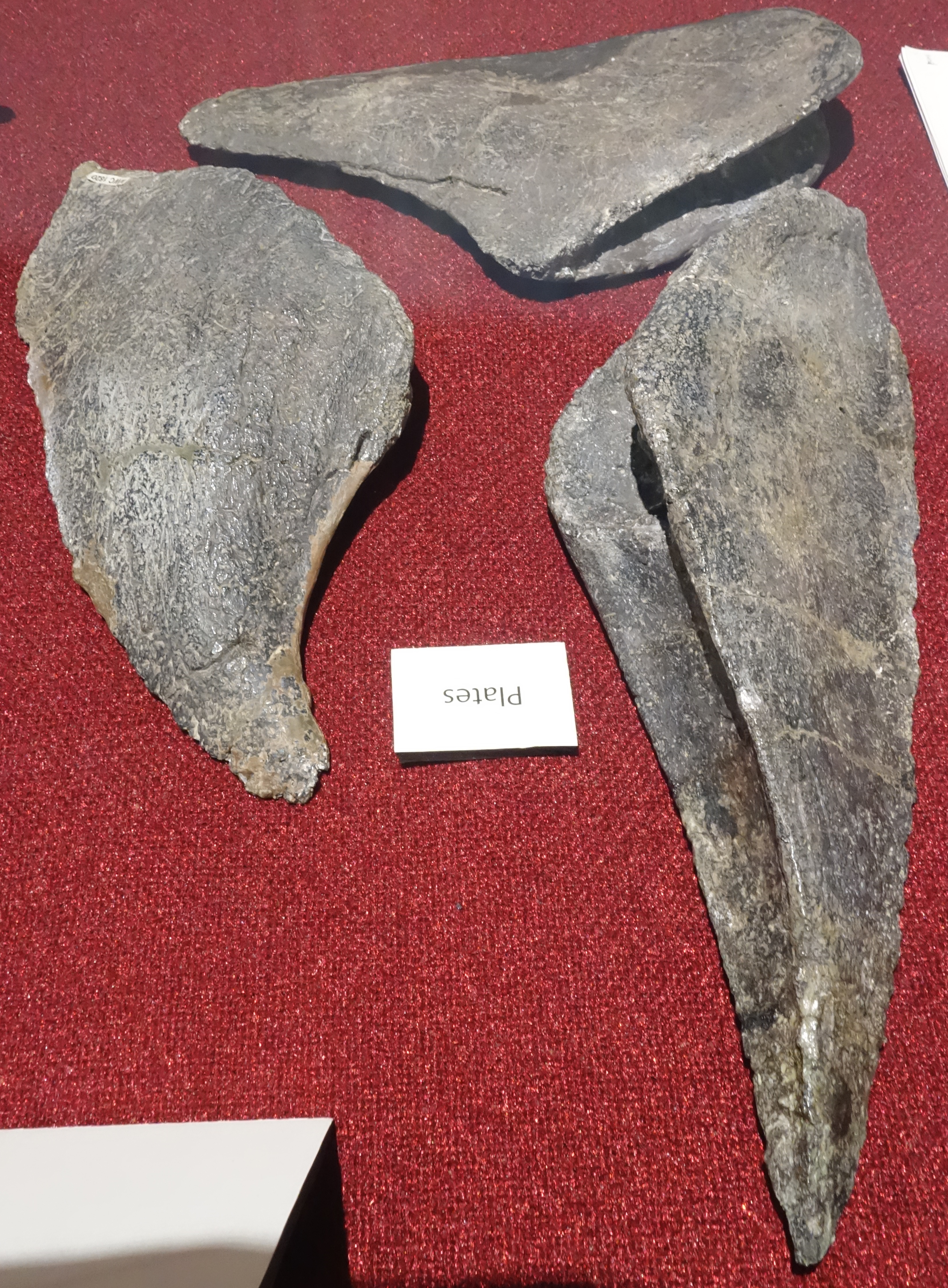
Three of the thin, triangular plates on display at the Dinosaur Journey Museum, Fruita.

A prominent feature of Mymoorapelta was its armor, which mostly consisted of large spiked osteoderms (bony armor) protruding from the lateral and dorsal sides of the body. These have not been found in articulation, so their exact placement on the body is unknown, though their position can be surmised based on the well preserved skeletons of other nodosaurids and ankylosaurs. In Mymoorapelta, there are five different preserved armor types: elongated spines with a large, hollow base; thin triangular plates with a narrow, asymmetrical base; small bladelike spines with a rounded, solid base; isolated, flat, keeled scutes; and scutes fused into a single plate of armor. The large spine is assumed to have extended from the base of the neck outward laterally, with the point curving posteriorly. Evidence from Borealopelta also supports the extension of the spike by a large keratin sheath. The aforementioned thin triangular plates, of which eight are known, are preserved similarly to those in Polacanthus further down the body. It was theorized by Kirkland and Carpenter that the largest of these plates were attached to the proximal part of the tail, and protruded laterally along the sides of the body. A specimen of Mymoorapelta preserves one of these at 11 centimetres (4.3 in) in length.

A single, small triangular plate was reported in 1994 and it preserves a thin, bladelike morphology, though its position is unknown. Twelve of the previously mentioned keeled, flat scutes were recovered from a specimen of Mymoorapelta in 1994, they preserve a keeled oval shape and an external surface that bears uniform, weak pitting, and a privation of neurovascular grooves (the system that controls blood flow and homeostasis) and foramina (small openings within bones). In the internal structure of the scutes, half of the space is made up of trabecular bone, while the rest is made up of thick external and basal cortices.

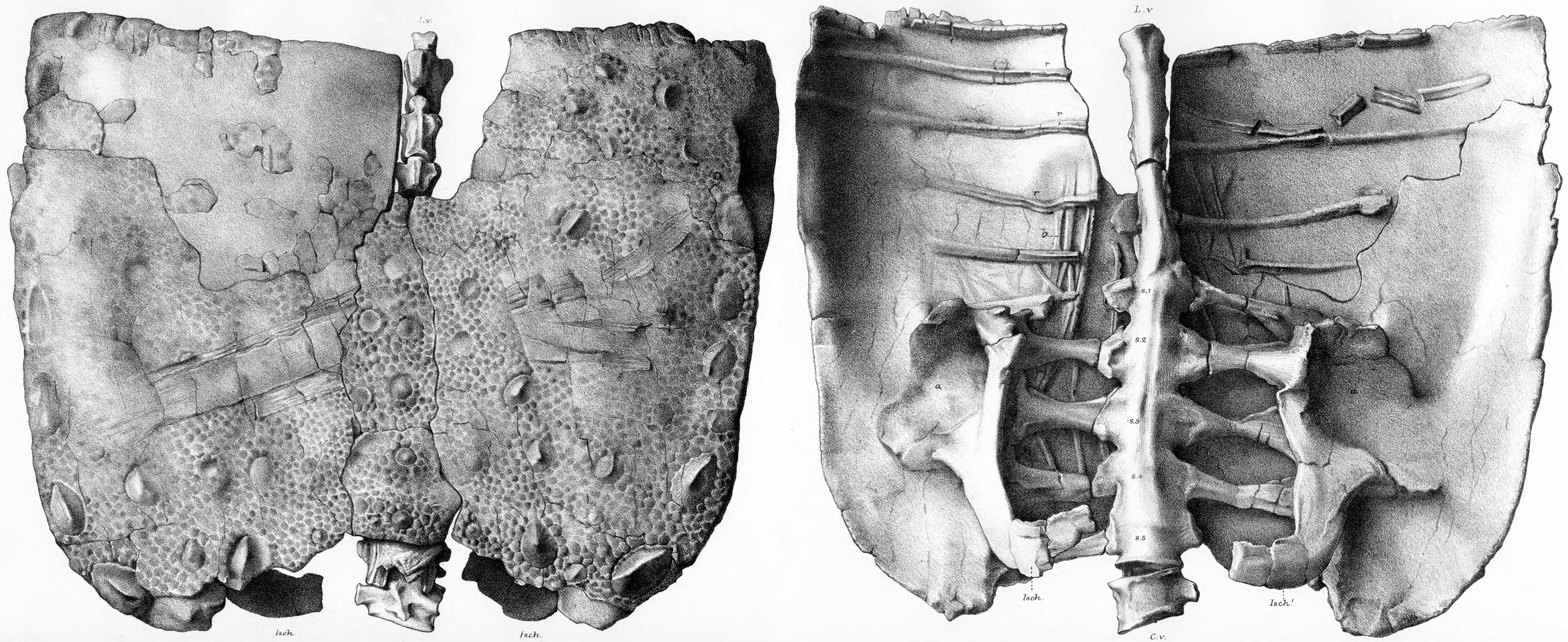
Sacral shield of the related ankylosaur, Polacanthus.

Lastly, a small fragment of dermal armor preserves a rosette (a large osteoderm surrounded by smaller osteoderms, forming a flower-like arrangement) formed by a large central scute surrounded on all sides by smaller ossicles. This piece of armor comes from the sacral shield, which is a large plate of small, connected armor across the sacrum and pelvis for protection. A more complete sacral shield was preserved in the Cactus Park specimen, with estimates placing the complete sacral shield at 70 centimetres (28 in) in width for a pelvis that is 50 centimetres (20 in) wide. The sacral shield also preserves two middle rows of larger scutes, with each row preserving seven. Mymoorapelta preserves a category 2 sacral shield, which is characterized by bosses (keeled osteoderms) that border tubercles (elevated knobs) as well as rosettes of co-ossified osteoderms. This category of sacral shield is mostly found in the "polacanthids", but the status of this group is generally unstable, and the trait is also known in some ankylosaurids like Shamosaurus. The category 2 shield is most similar to that of category 3, though the latter preserves polygonal osteoderms that lack rosettes. However, Victoria Arbour et al. (2011) suggested that category 1 shields could simply be an ontogenetic (growth) stage of category 2, as they have very similar morphology but are not co-ossified, which is an ontogenetic trait present in extant armored animals like armadillos and alligators. The current categorisation of sacral shields into distinct categories finds its origins in a 2011 paper by Arbour, Michael E. Burns and Philip J. Currie, and gives three distinct characteristics, one for each of the three categories. Category 1 shields are characterized by non-coosified osteoderms, category 2 shields by coossified rosettes, and category 3 by uniformly sized coossified polygons.

On the upper surface of the back and tail, the skin was covered in small osteoderms, which are sometimes referred to as ossicles, in-between larger plates of armor as inferred by Sauropelta, though ossicles themselves are not known confidently outside of the sacral shield in Mymoorapelta. The armor of Mymoorapelta differs from that of Gargoyleosaurus in that the former has solid conical armor compared to the thin-walled armor of the latter.

== Paleobiology ==
=== Diet and feeding ===
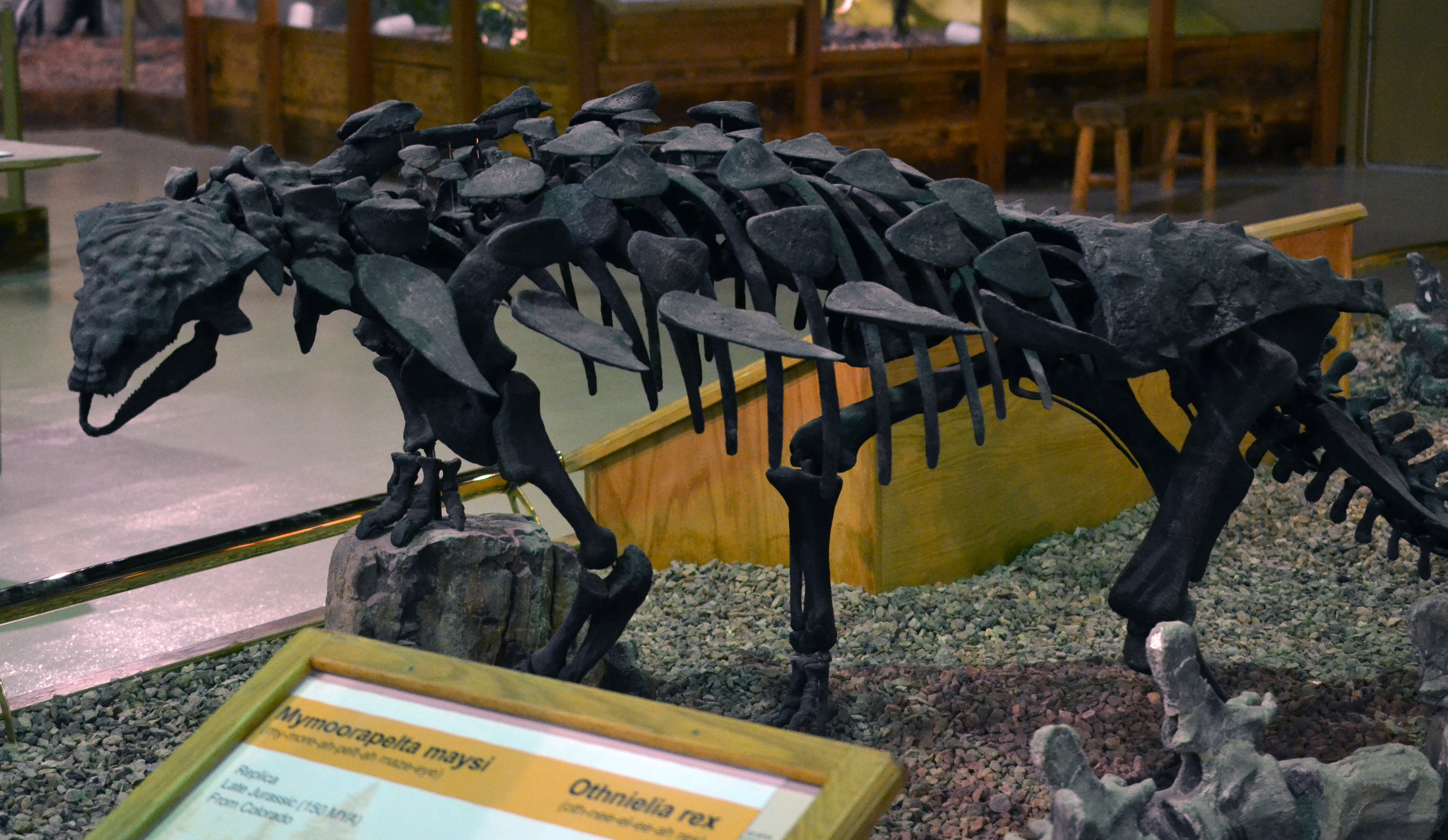
Reconstructed skeleton shown from the side, Wyoming Dinosaur Center

Mymoorapelta was a low-browsing herbivore like its relatives, likely feeding on the ferns, cycads, and conifers that dominated the flora of its time due to the lack of complex grasses in the Jurassic. Nodosaurids like Mymoorapelta had narrow snouts, an adaptation seen today in animals that are selective browsers as opposed to the wide muzzles of grazers. In ankylosaurs, the Jurassic and mid-Cretaceous forms with narrow and pointed muzzles were apparently the most selective feeders, akin to extant mammalian browsers. This is in stark contrast to the later ankylosaurs that were adapted to bulk feeding on food with lower nutritional value. The preservation of complete a hyoid in taxa like the ankylosaurid Pinacosaurus and the nodosaurid Edmontonia demonstrate that ankylosaurs had fleshy, muscular tongues that could have assisted with feeding on plants that grew low to the ground. Tongue protrusion and prehension is not confidently known, but lingual food manipulation could have been used in later ankylosaurids to crop food, like in giraffes. The preservation of cheek plates in Edmontonia and Panoplosaurus provide evidence for fleshy cheeks and chewing, with the cheek covering the tooth rows both for defense and to prevent food loss when eating.

Tooth occlusion is not directly preserved in Mymoorapelta or its close relative Gargoyleosaurus, but it has been found in other nodosaurids from the Cretaceous. The earliest evidence of nodosaurid dental occlusion is in Sauropelta, which demonstrated a basic motion, in that the power strokes moved vertically. In contrast to later nodosaurids, tooth-to-tooth contact was incidental or local when present and a biphasial jaw mechanism was lacking in both Mymoorapelta and Gargoyleosaurus. Ankylosaurs generally demonstrate more variable wear patterns than the contemporary ceratopsids and hadrosaurids of the Cretaceous. Even though ankylosaurs may not have fed on fibrous and woody plants, they may have had a varied diet which included tough leaves and pulpy fruits.

=== Habitat preference ===
Due to competition with diplodocid sauropods, Mymoorapelta seems more adapted for open environments. Mymoorapelta has a very limited known distribution, having only been found at two sites in Western Colorado, in addition to the Hanksville-Burpee and potential Albuquerque specimens. This could be due to Mymoorapelta preferring to feed on a specific variety of plant, constricting its possible distribution. The Hanksville-Burpee specimen's taphonomy (how and where it decomposed to end up as a fossil) suggests that the individual had died inland, contrary to the coastal distribution previously inferred for nodosaurids.

=== Limb movements ===
Reconstructions of ankylosaur forelimb musculature made by Coombs in 1978 suggest that the forelimbs bore the majority of the animal's weight and that they were adapted for high force delivery on the front feet, possibly for food gathering. In addition, Coombs suggested that ankylosaurs may have been capable diggers, though the hoof-like structure of the manus would have limited fossorial capabilities. Ankylosaurs were likely to have been slow-moving and sluggish animals, though they may have been capable of quick movements when necessary. Mymoorapelta preserves very short limbs with even shorter distal limb elements, which is in contrast to the longer distal limb elements known in other nodosaurids but similar to the condition found in ankylosaurids and Polacanthus.

=== Armor and tail ===
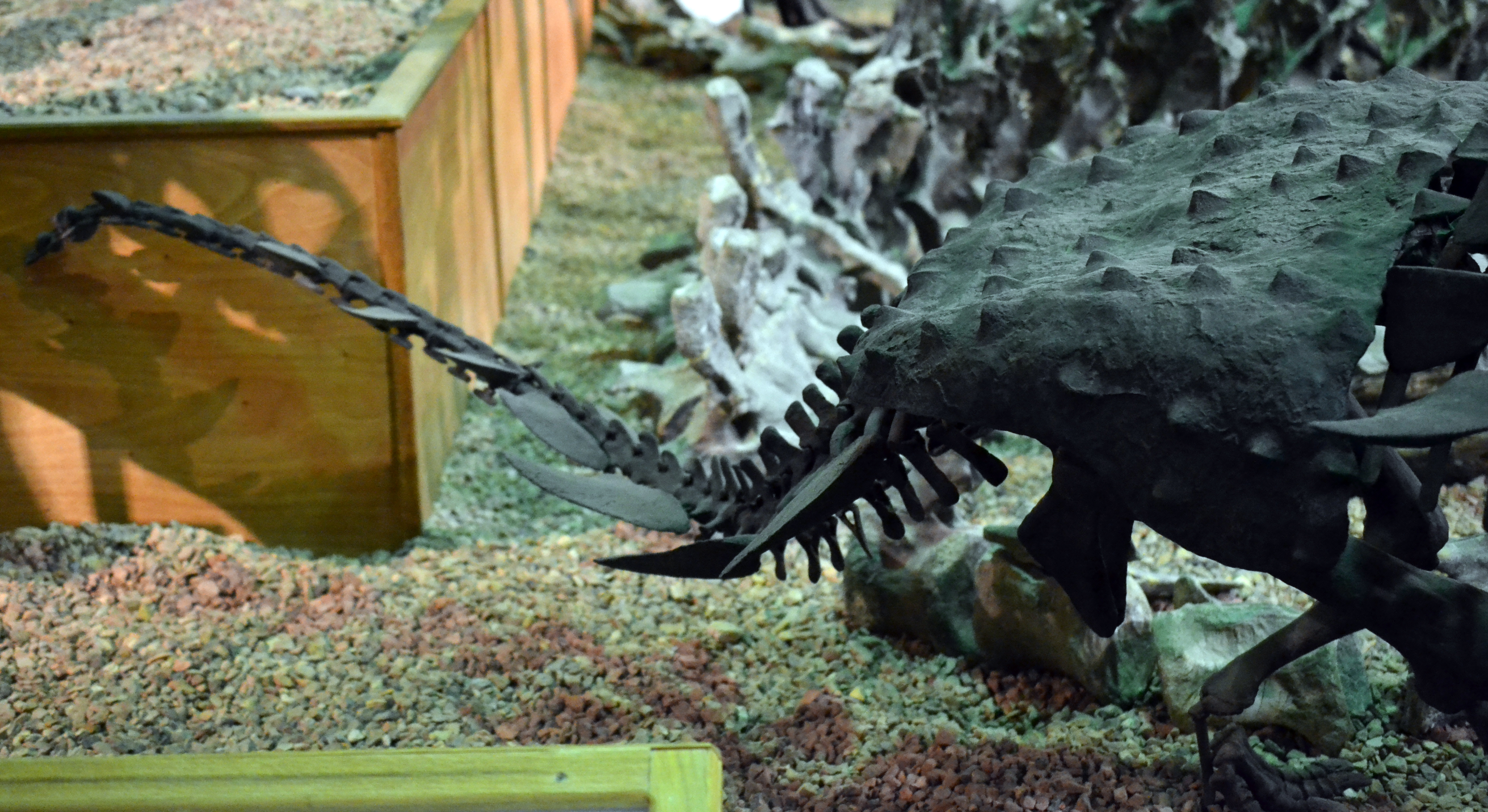
Reconstructed tail and hip armor, Wyoming Dinosaur Center

The consensus is that the armor of ankylosauroids was used for defensive purposes, mainly to fend off any attacking carnivores. The tails of these animals have a complex evolutionary history, with basal taxa like Mymoorapelta possessing a flexible tail with pointed osteoderms on either side and on top. The aforementioned flexibility of the tail would allow for a greater range of motion than the stiff tails of later ankylosaurids and nodosaurids. It is thought that the tail could also have been used in defense against predators, though more recent findings by Arbour et al. in 2022 also consider the possibility that the tails of ankylosaurids were used for intraspecific combat and might have primarily evolved to fill a function here, which might indicate a similar use in more basal taxa like Mymoorapelta and Gargoyleosaurus.

== Classification ==
Mymoorapelta is one of the basalmost known genera of Nodosauridae, an extinct family of medium to large, heavily built, quadrupedal, herbivorous dinosaurs which possess small, leaf-shaped teeth. The clade was named in 1890 by Othniel Charles Marsh, who designated the Cretaceous genus Nodosaurus as the type genus based on the heavy dermal armor, solid bones, large forelimbs, and ungulate feet it preserves. Nodosaurids first evolved in the Late Jurassic (ca. 155 mya), with Mymoorapelta and the similarly sized Gargoyleosaurus being early members of the evolutionary radiation which would continue into the Cretaceous in accordance with Cope's Rule. The nodosaurids went extinct in the Late Cretaceous (ca. 66 mya) during the Cretaceous–Paleogene extinction event along with the other non-avian dinosaurs.

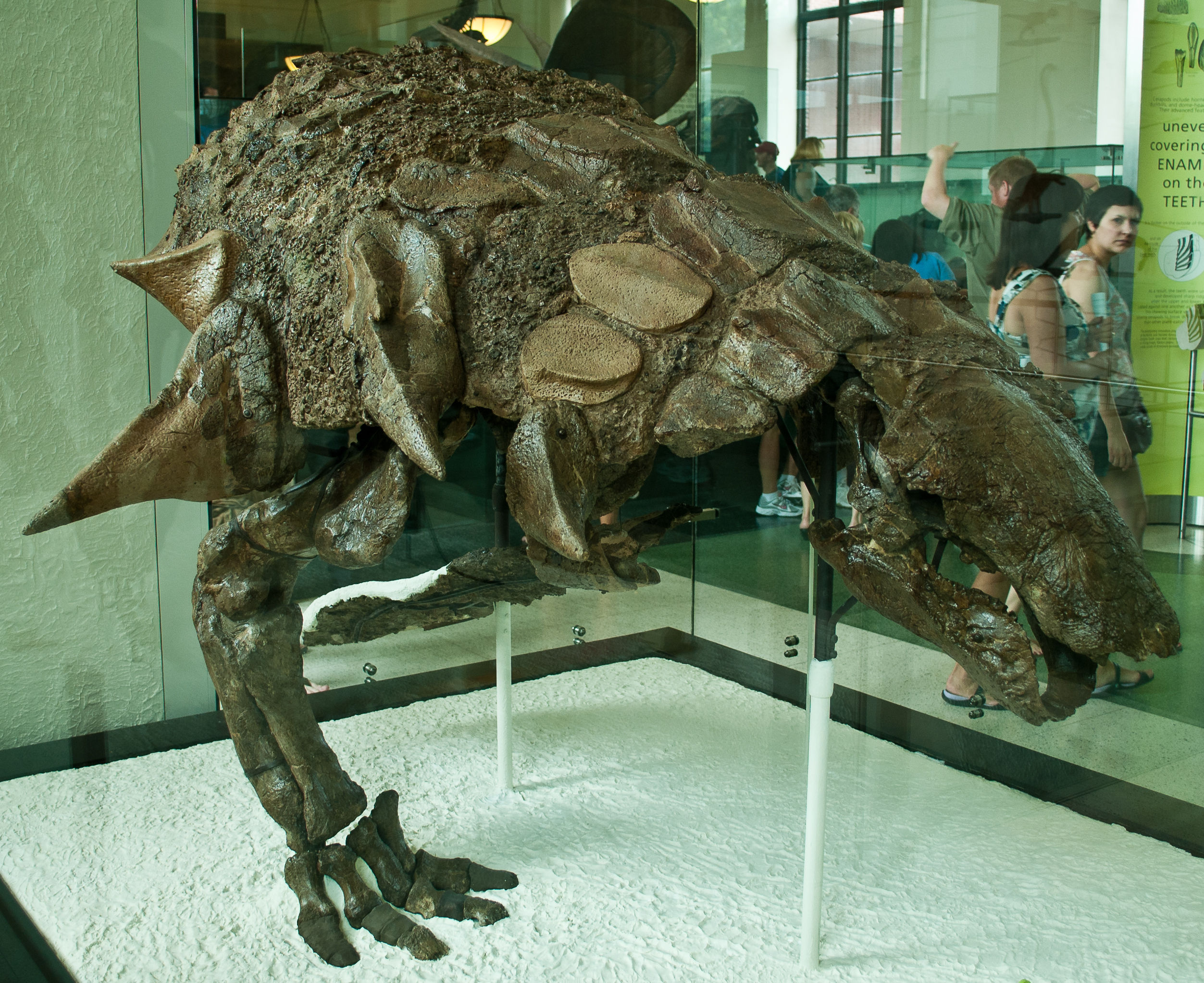
Skeleton of the related nodosaur Edmontonia.

Nodosaurids are situated within the group Euankylosauria, together with the closely related family Ankylosauridae. Nodosaurids differ from ankylosaurids in the fact that ankylosaurids evolved more recently, during the Early Cretaceous, and in several distinct anatomical characteristics; most notably the lack of mace-like tail clubs, with nodosaurs having osteoderm-lined, flexible tails instead, and the possession of sacral shields. Many nodosaurids also had spikes projecting outwards from their shoulders, and two armored half-rings on their neck, among other traits. A third proposed family, Polacanthidae, was erected for several genera that were similar to nodosaurids but had more fragile armor and a different distribution. However, it has seen little support from phylogenetic analyses in recent years and is in a state of flux. Euankylosauria encompasses all members of Ankylosauria except for the clade Parankylosauria, which is a smaller group known exclusively from a few taxa that lived in the Cretaceous of Gondwana, rather than the euankylosaurs, who were endemic to Laurasia.

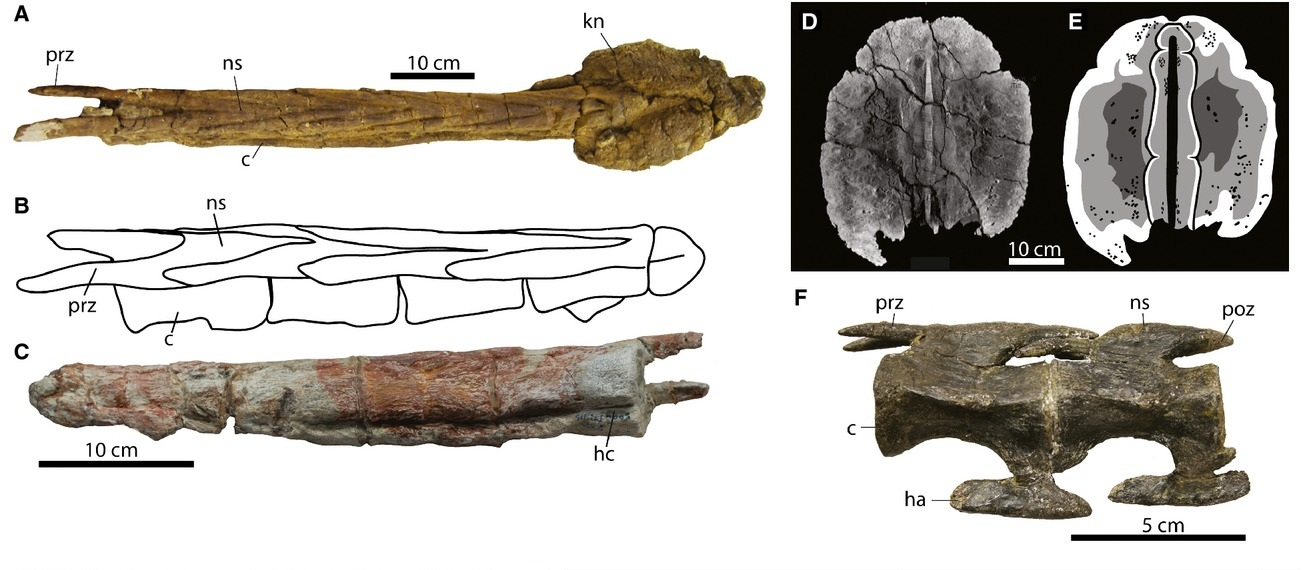
Tail anatomy of ankylosaurs, F is Mymoorapelta

When Mymoorapelta was originally named, Kirkland and Carpenter placed the taxon as a potential nodosaurid, though at that time there were only a few taxa to compare the material to. The phylogenetic placement was changed in 1998 when it was considered closer to the European polacanthids, though this affiliation has been doubted. Matthew Vickaryous et al. (2004) considered the genus Ankylosauria incertae sedis, while a cladistic analysis performed by Thompson et al. (2011) suggests that Mymoorapelta is a basal nodosaurid as originally theorized by Kirkland and Carpenter. A 2010 phylogenetic analysis utilizing undescribed material resulted with Mymoorapelta as the sister taxon to Gargoyleosaurus in their own group outside of Polacanthidae, Nodosauridae, and Ankylosauridae. In a 2018 phylogenetic analysis by Rivera-Sylva and colleagues which has been reproduced below, Mymoorapelta is recovered as a basal nodosaurid in a clade with Sauroplites and Dongyangopelta that represents the most basal group within Nodosauridae, while Gargoyleosaurus is recovered as more derived, further proving their distinction. Alternatively, Mymoorapelta may also be an ankylosaur outside both Nodosauridae and Ankylosauridae.

The phylogenetic analyses of Rivera-Sylva and colleagues (left) and Thomas Raven and colleagues (right) found Mymoorapelta as a basal member of either Nodosauridae or Ankylosauridae.

- Nodosauridae
  - - Sauroplites
    - Mymoorapelta
    - Dongyangopelta
  - - Gastonia
    - - Gargoyleosaurus
      - - Polacanthinae
        - Nodosaurinae

- Ankylosauridae
  - - Borealopelta
    - - Mymoorapelta
      - Stegopelta
  - - - Vectipelta
      - - Dongyangopelta
        - Zhejiangosaurus
    - - Ahshislepelta
      - - - Aletopelta
          - Talarurus
        - - Shamosaurinae
          - Ankylosaurinae

== Paleoecology ==
The Morrison Formation is a sequence of shallow marine and alluvial sediments which, according to radiometric dating, ranges between 156.3 million years old (Ma) at its base, to ~150 ma at the top, placing it in the late Oxfordian, Kimmeridgian, and early Tithonian stages of the Upper Jurassic period. The paleoenvironment of the Morrison Formation is interpreted as a semiarid environment with distinct wet and dry seasons, and flat floodplains. Vegetation varied from river-lining forests of conifers, tree ferns, and ferns (gallery forests), to fern savannas with occasional trees such as the Araucaria-like conifer Brachyphyllum. The Morrison Basin where dinosaurs lived stretched from New Mexico to Alberta and Saskatchewan, and was formed when the precursors to the Front Range of the Rocky Mountains started pushing up to the west. The deposits from their east-facing drainage basins were carried by streams and rivers and deposited in swampy lowlands, lakes, river channels and floodplains.

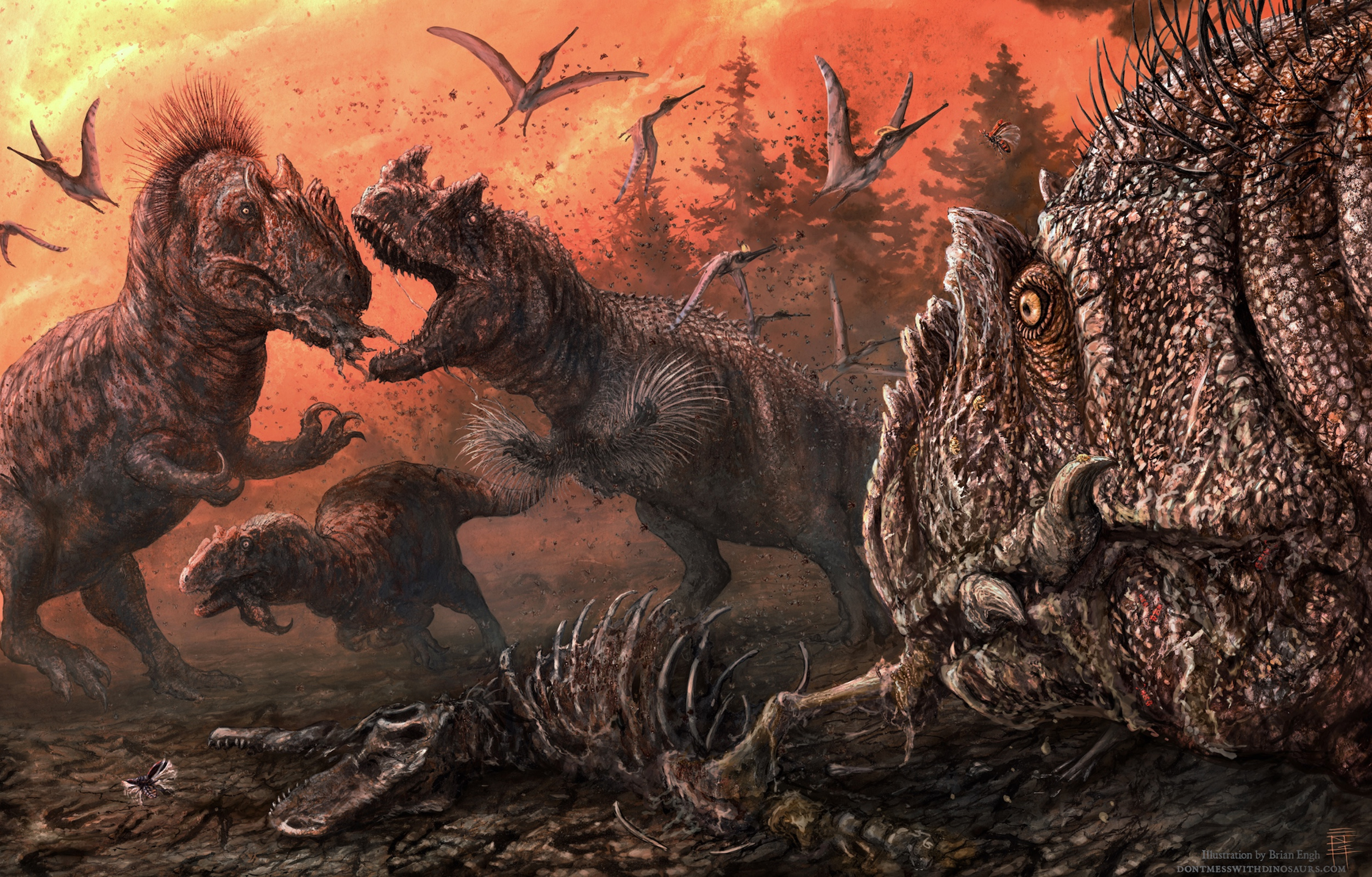
Illustration of the theropods Ceratosaurus and Allosaurus fighting over food in the Mygatt-Moore Quarry.

The Mygatt-Moore Quarry where Mymoorapelta was first found has been dated between 151.89 and 152.47 million years old, firmly placing it within the Brushy Basin Member of the Morrison Formation. The broader paleoenvironment of the area has been interpreted as a riparian (riverine) ecosystem with abundant flora and a high water table, with the quarry itself having been interpreted as an attritional accumulation of dinosaur fossils at a seasonal waterhole. This has allowed it to become one of the most fossil abundant sites in the United States, with the site notably preserving plants, pollen, coprolites, and even skin impressions preserved alongside dinosaur fossils. The quarry's abundant plant fossils include horsetails, cycads, Gingkoales, Czekanowskiales, and many different Coniferales represented by leaf, wood, and pollen fossils. Invertebrates represented in the quarry include gastropods and, most notably, fossils of fossil crayfish.

As for vertebrates, three different kinds of fish have been described from the quarry based on fossils of astonishing quality, including Hulettia hawesi and Morrolepis schaefferi. The most common fossils from the quarry are dinosaurian in nature. Allosaurus, a large carnivorous theropod, and Apatosaurus, a large diplodocid sauropod, are the two most common dinosaurs in the quarry, with Mymoorapelta being the third most common at the site. Fossils of several other dinosaurs are known from the quarry, including the theropod Ceratosaurus, the sauropods Camarasaurus and Diplodocus, and potentially the small ornithischian Nanosaurus. Remains of other vertebrate groups like crocodyliforms and turtles are rare in the quarry, indicating the lack of continuous standing water in the form of lakes or ponds.

Fossils of Mymoorapelta and the theropod Allosaurus that preserve bite marks have been described from the Mygatt-Moore Quarry by Stephanie Drumheller et al. (2020), alongside other bones found with feeding traces. Unlike the others, the fossils of Mymoorapelta and Allosaurus preserve striations that, when measured to determine denticle (serration) width, produced tooth and body size extrapolations greater than any known specimen of Allosaurus or Ceratosaurus, the two large predators of the quarry that are known from osteological remains. The extrapolations are instead coherent either with an unusually large specimen of Allosaurus, or a separate large taxon like Torvosaurus or Saurophaganax, neither of which preserves fossil material within the quarry. The result either increases the known diversity of the site based on ichnological evidence alone, or represents powerful evidence of cannibalism in Allosaurus. Based on the position and nutrient value associated with the various skeletal elements with bite marks, it is predicted that Mymoorapelta was either predated upon or scavenged shortly after death.

== See also ==
- Gargoyleosaurus
- Gastonia
- Polacanthus
- Timeline of ankylosaur research
