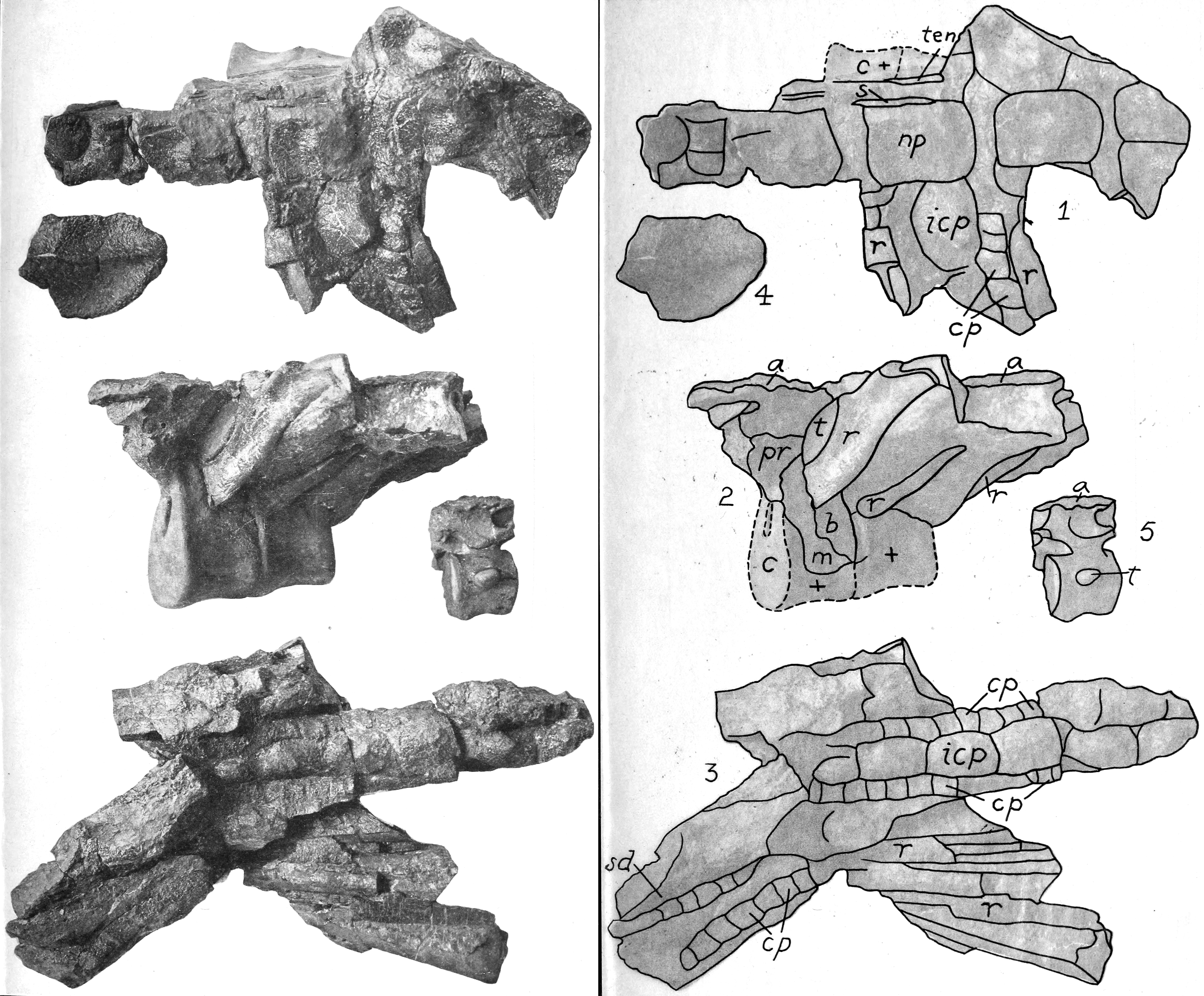
- Vertebrae and armor of the holotype

Scientific classification
- Kingdom: Animalia
- Phylum: Chordata
- Class: Reptilia
- Clade: Dinosauria
- Clade: †Ornithischia
- Clade: †Thyreophora
- Clade: †Ankylosauria
- Family: †Nodosauridae
- Subfamily: †Nodosaurinae
- Genus: †Nodosaurus; Marsh, 1889

Type species
- †Nodosaurus textilis Marsh, 1889

= Nodosaurus =

Nodosaurus Temporal range: Late Cretaceous, 99.7–86.3 Ma

Extinct genus of dinosaurs

Nodosaurus (meaning 'knobbed lizard') is a genus of herbivorous nodosaurid ankylosaurian dinosaur from the Late Cretaceous, the fossils of which are found exclusively in the Frontier Formation in Wyoming.

== Discovery and naming ==
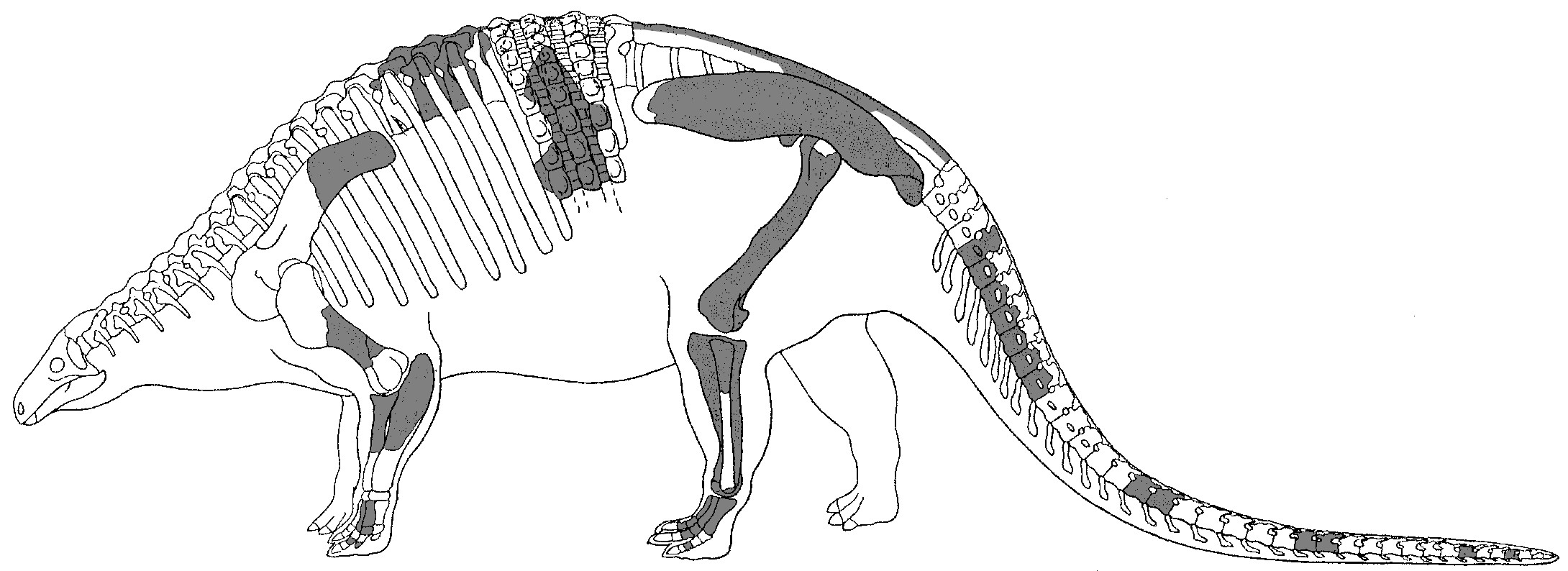
Historical reconstruction of the holotype skeleton from 1921

Fossils of Nodosaurus were first discovered on 17 July, 1881 by fossil collector William Harlow Reed in Albany County, Wyoming in the western United States. This discovery was made during the Bone Wars, a scientific competition between paleontologists Othniel Charles Marsh and Edward Drinker Cope, and as part of an expedition to the Jurassic-aged strata of the Morrison Formation in Como Bluff. The remains, cataloged as YPM VP 1815 at the Yale Peabody Museum in New Haven, found included: 3 dorsal and 13 caudal vertebrae, 3 dorsal ribs, fragmentary forelimbs, a partial pelvis, femora, tibiae, partial left pes, and several osteoderms. The fossils all came from a single quarry located around 1.5 miles (2.4 km) from Quarry 13 of Como Bluff. However, the outcrop the Nodosaurus skeleton was unearthed from comes from the Frontier Formation, also known as the Dakota Sandstone, which dates to the Cenomanian age of the Late Cretaceous period.

In 1889, Othniel Charles Marsh scientifically described the remains and assigned them to a new genus and species of ornithischian dinosaur, which he named Nodosaurus textilis. The generic name Nodosaurus derives from the Latin "nodus" meaning "knobbed", a reference to the knobbed osteoderms of the animal, and the Latin "sauros" meaning "lizard", a common suffix for dinosaur names. The specific name textilis refers to the textile-like appearance of the osteoderms. In his description, Marsh classified Nodosaurus as a member of Stegosauria, a group of plated ornithsichians. However the next year, Marsh classified Nodosaurus in its own family, Nodosauridae, in the order Ceratopsia, a group of horned ornithischians. In 1921, paleontologist Richard Swan Lull published a more comprehensive description of Nodosaurus in which he defined the family and the genus. Later in 1978, paleontologist Walter Coombs Jr. hypothesized that the other nodosaurids Stegopelta and Hierosaurus were synonyms of Nodosaurus, but this has seen little support.

== Description ==
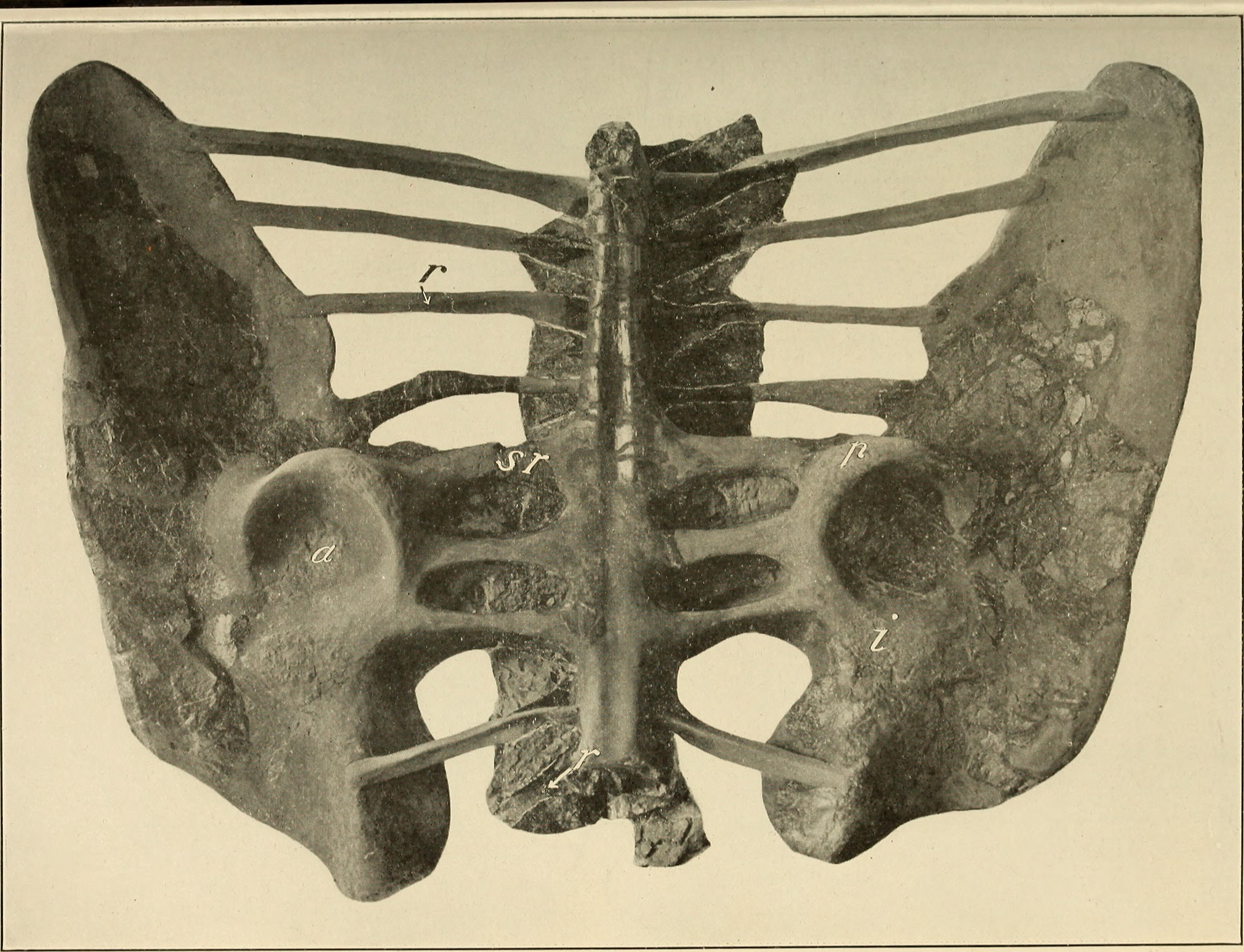
Pelvis of the holotype specimen

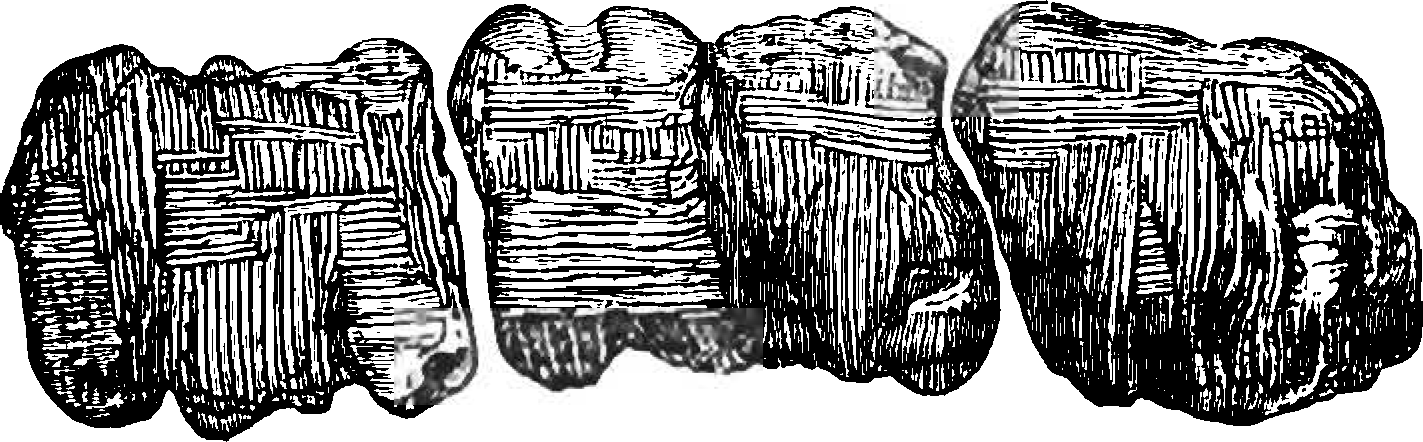
Scutes of the holotype specimen

Nodosaurus grew up to roughly 4 to 6 metres (13 to 20 ft) long and it was an ornithischian dinosaur with bony dermal plates covering the top of its body, and it may have had spikes along its side as well. The dermal plates were arranged in bands along its body, with narrow bands over the ribs alternating with wider plates in between. These wider plates were covered in regularly arranged bony nodules, which give the animal its scientific name. In 2010 Paul estimated its length at 6 meters (20 ft) and its weight at 3.5 tonnes (3.85 short tons).

It had four short legs, five-toed feet, a short neck, and a long, stiff, clubless tail. The head was narrow, with a pointed snout, powerful jaws, and small teeth. It perhaps ate soft plants, as it would have been unable to chew tough, fibrous ones; or alternatively it may have processed the latter with gastroliths and its enormous intestinal apparatus.

== Classification ==
Within Nodosauridae, Nodosaurus falls out in the subfamily Nodosaurinae, formally defined as the largest clade containing Nodosaurus textilis but not Hylaeosaurus armatus, Mymoorapelta maysi and Polacanthus foxii. The 2018 phylogenetic analysis of Nodosauridae by Rivera-Sylva and colleagues is below.

- Nodosauridae
  - - Sauroplites
    - Mymoorapelta
    - Dongyangopelta
  - - Gastonia
    - - Gargoyleosaurus
      - - Polacanthinae
          - Hoplitosaurus
          - Polacanthus
        - Nodosaurinae
          - Peloroplites
          - - Taohelong
            - Sauropelta
            - - Acantholipan
              - Nodosaurus
              - - Niobrarasaurus
                - Ahshislepelta
              - - Tatankacephalus
                - - Silvisaurus
                  - - CPC 273
                    - - Panoplosaurini
                      - Struthiosaurini

== See also ==
- Timeline of ankylosaur research
