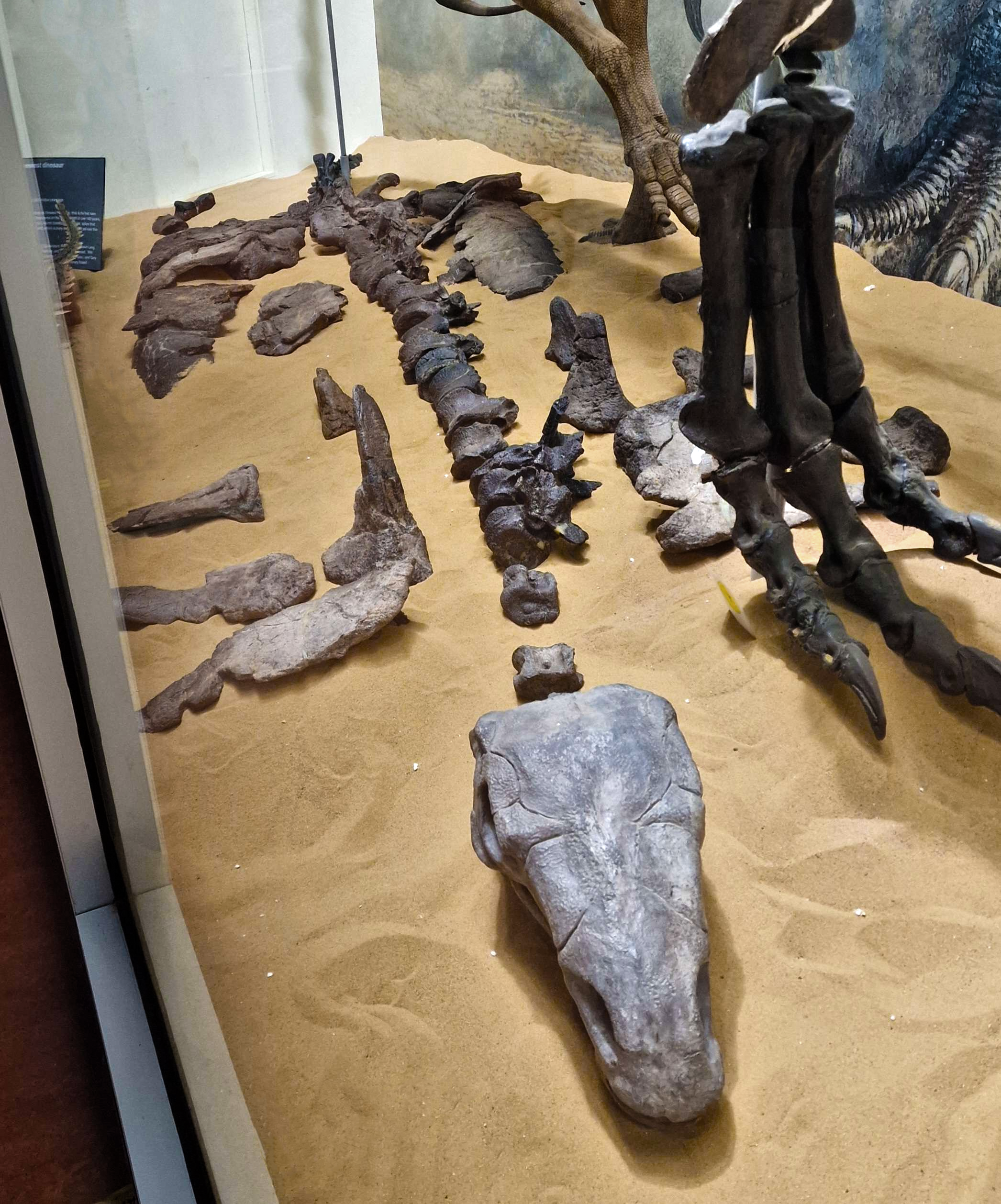
- V. barretti holotype at the Dinosaur Isle Museum with a modeled skull (no cranial bones are known from this taxon)

Scientific classification
- Kingdom: Animalia
- Phylum: Chordata
- Class: Reptilia
- Clade: Dinosauria
- Clade: †Ornithischia
- Clade: †Thyreophora
- Clade: †Ankylosauria
- Genus: †Vectipelta; Pond et al., 2023
- Species: †V. barretti

Binomial name
- †Vectipelta barretti Pond et al., 2023

= Vectipelta =

Vectipelta Temporal range: Early Cretaceous, Hauterivian–Barremian

Genus of ankylosaurian dinosaurs

Vectipelta (meaning "Isle of Wight shield") is an extinct genus of ankylosaurian dinosaur recovered from the Early Cretaceous Wessex Formation of England. The genus contains a single species, V. barretti, known from a partial skeleton including several osteoderms. It was historically known as the "Spearpoint ankylosaur" prior to its description.

== Discovery and naming ==
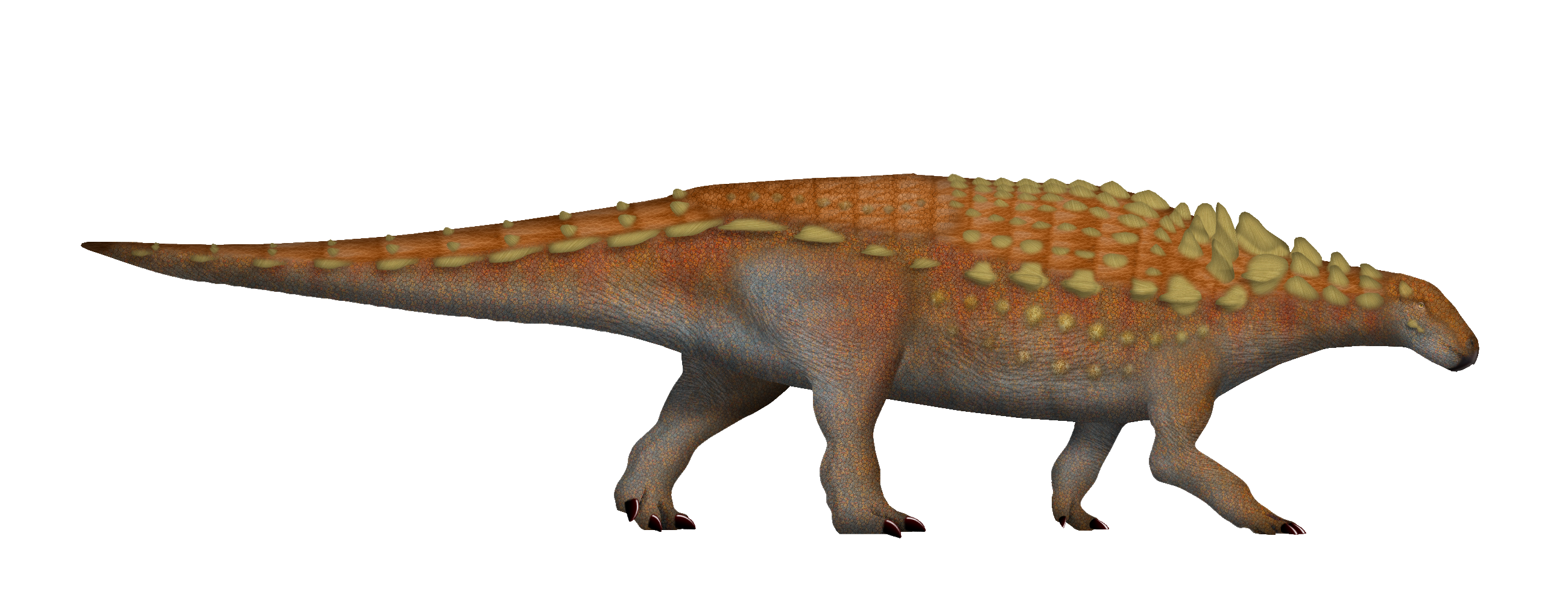
Life restoration

The Vectipelta holotype specimens, IWCMS 1996.153 and IWCMS 2021.75, were discovered in November 1993 (nine vertebrae by Gavin Leng) and March 1994 (by Lin Spearpoint) in sediments of the Wessex Formation near Chilton Chine on the Isle of Wight, England. The holotype consists of a partial skeleton including many cervical, dorsal, sacral, and caudal vertebrae, partial pectoral and pelvic girdles, elements of the fore- and hindlimbs, and several osteoderms. At first the remains were assigned to Polacanthus.

The fossil material was initially described in a PhD thesis by Thomas J. Raven and concluded to represent a new taxon in 2021. A May 2023 study proposing a paraphyletic Nodosauridae included the "Spearpoint ankylosaur" in its phylogenetic dataset, although it was given the placeholder name "Polywotsit" in the supplementary information.

In June 2023, Stuart Pond and colleagues described Vectipelta barretti as a new genus and species of ankylosaurian based on these fossil remains. The generic name, "Vectipelta", is derived from "Vectis", the Roman name for the Isle of Wight. The specific name, "barretti", honours palaeontologist Paul Barrett of the Natural History Museum.

Vectipelta is the first ankylosaur identified from the Isle of Wight in 142 years, suggesting that the myriad of specimens previously assigned to Polacanthus and Hylaeosaurus may actually represent multiple taxa.

== Classification ==
Pond et al. (2023) recovered Vectipelta as the sister taxon to a clade formed by Dongyangopelta and Zhejiangosaurus (with this clade being sister to Ankylosauridae, and the traditional Nodosauridae recovered as paraphyletic). It is only distantly related to Polacanthus and Hylaeosaurus, which have also been found in the Wealden Group. The results of their phylogenetic analyses are shown in the cladogram below, with Wealden Group ankylosaurs highlighted:

- Ankylosauria
  - - Sarcolestes
    - - Cedarpelta
      - - Polacanthidae
          - Hoplitosaurus
          - - - Polacanthus
              - Niobrarasaurus
            - - Hylaeosaurus
              - Gastonia
        - - - Panoplosauridae
            - Struthiosauridae
          - - Borealopelta
            - - - Vectipelta
                - - Zhejiangosaurus
                  - Dongyangopelta
              - - Ankylosauridae

== Ecology ==
The Wessex Formation spans a considerable period of time of probably several million years, and therefore not all animals known from the formation are likely to have been contemporaneous. Vectipelta is likely millions of years older than Polacanthus.
