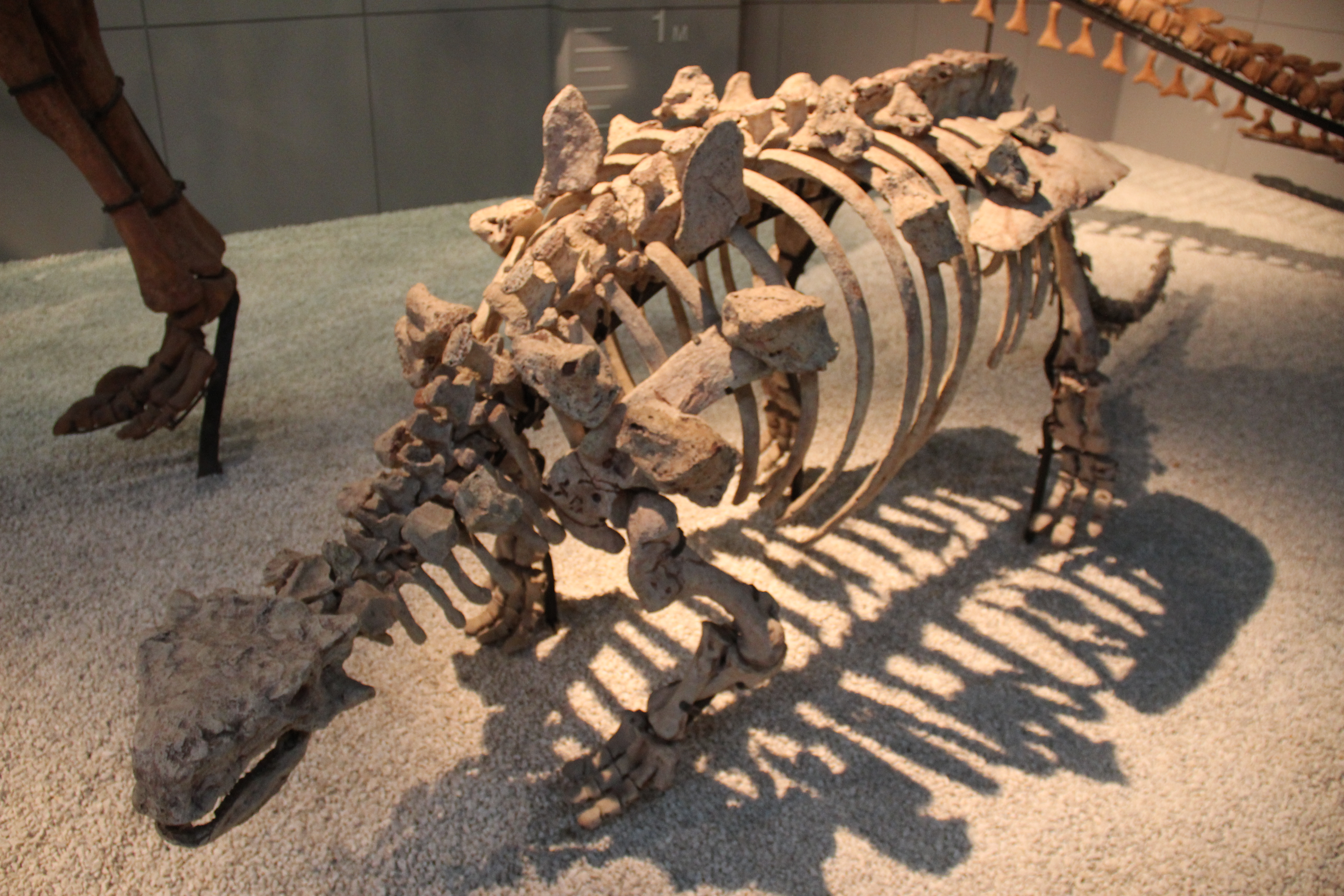
- Zhejiangosaurus lishuiensis on display at the Zhejiang Museum of Natural History

Scientific classification
- Kingdom: Animalia
- Phylum: Chordata
- Class: Reptilia
- Clade: Dinosauria
- Clade: †Ornithischia
- Clade: †Thyreophora
- Clade: †Ankylosauria
- Clade: †Euankylosauria
- Genus: †Zhejiangosaurus; Lü et al., 2007
- Species: †Z. lishuiensis

Binomial name
- †Zhejiangosaurus lishuiensis Lü et al., 2007

= Zhejiangosaurus =

Zhejiangosaurus Temporal range: Late Cretaceous, 100.5–93.9 Ma

Extinct genus of dinosaurs

Zhejiangosaurus (meaning "Zhejiang lizard") is an extinct genus of ankylosaurian dinosaur from the Upper Cretaceous (Cenomanian stage) of Zhejiang, eastern China. It was first named by a group of Chinese authors Lü Junchang, Jin Xingsheng, Sheng Yiming and Li Yihong in 2007 and the type species is Zhejiangosaurus lishuiensis ("from Lishui", where the fossil was found). It has no diagnostic features, and thus is a nomen dubium.

== Description ==
Zhejiangosaurus could grow up to 4.5 m (17 ft) in length and was 1.4 metric tons in weight.

== Material ==
Material for Zhejiangosaurus consists of the holotype, ZNHM M8718, a partial skeleton which has preserved a sacrum with eight vertebrae, a complete right ilium and partial left ilium, a complete right pubis, the proximal end of the right ischium, two complete hindlimbs, fourteen caudal vertebrae, and some unidentified bones. These remains come from Liancheng, in the Chinese administrative unit of Lishui on the province of Zhejiang and they were collected from the Cenomanian-age Chaochuan Formation.

== Systematics ==
On the species description, Lü et al. (2007) found Zhejiangosaurus to belong to the ankylosaurian family Nodosauridae.

Zhejiangosaurus in a cladogram after Pond et al. (2023):

- Ankylosauria
  - - Sarcolestes
    - - Cedarpelta
      - - Polacanthidae
          - Hoplitosaurus
          - - - Polacanthus
              - Niobrarasaurus
            - - Hylaeosaurus
              - Gastonia
        - - - Panoplosauridae
            - Struthiosauridae
          - - Borealopelta
            - - - Vectipelta
                - - Zhejiangosaurus
                  - Dongyangopelta
              - - Ankylosauridae

== See also ==
- Timeline of ankylosaur research
