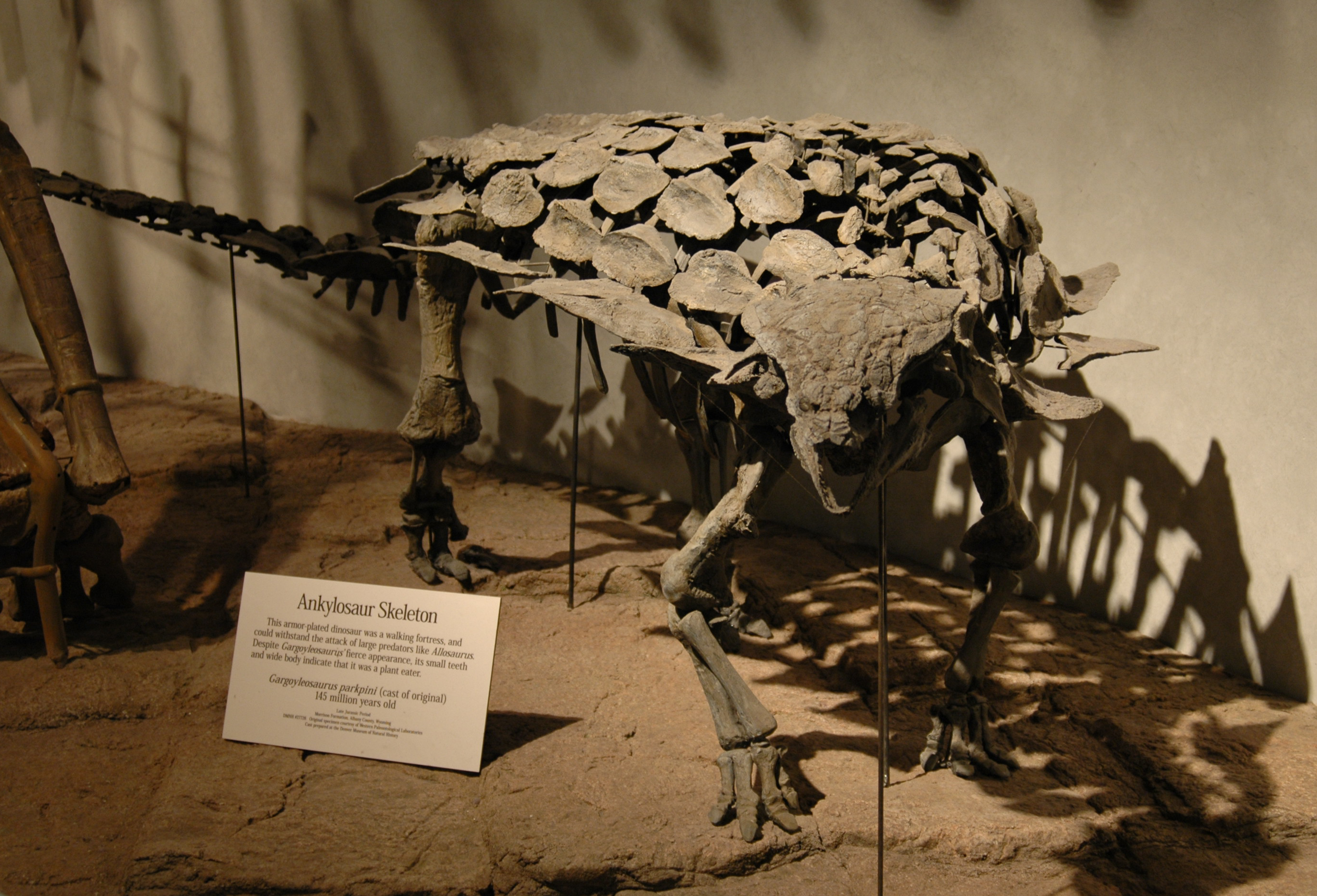
- Fossil skeleton, Denver Museum of Nature and Science

Scientific classification
- Kingdom: Animalia
- Phylum: Chordata
- Class: Reptilia
- Clade: Dinosauria
- Clade: †Ornithischia
- Clade: †Thyreophora
- Clade: †Ankylosauria
- Family: †Nodosauridae
- Genus: †Gargoyleosaurus; Carpenter et al. 1998
- Species: †G. parkpinorum

Binomial name
- †Gargoyleosaurus parkpinorum Carpenter et al. 1998

= Gargoyleosaurus =

Gargoyleosaurus Temporal range: Late Jurassic, 154–150 Ma

Extinct species of reptile

Gargoyleosaurus (meaning "gargoyle lizard") is one of the earliest ankylosaurs known from reasonably complete fossil remains. The holotype was discovered in 1995 at the Bone Cabin Quarry West locality, in Albany County, Wyoming in exposures of the Upper Jurassic (Kimmeridgian to Tithonian stages) Morrison Formation.

The type species, G. parkpinorum (originally G. parkpini) was described by Ken Carpenter et al. in 1998. A mounted skeletal reconstruction of Gargoyleosaurus parkpinorum can be seen at the Denver Museum of Nature and Science and, alongside a couple skeletons of baby Stegosaurus, has been on display there since around 2002. Gargoyleosaurus was present in stratigraphic zone 2 of the Morrison Formation.

== Discovery ==
Size comparison

The holotype specimen of Gargoyleosaurus parkpinorum was collected by Western Paleontology Labs in 1995 and is currently held in the collections of the Denver Museum of Nature and Science, Denver, Colorado. Besides the holotype, two other partial skeletons are known (although not yet described). The holotype consists of most of the skull and a partial postcranial skeleton. The specimen was originally described as Gargoyleosaurus parkpini by Carpenter, Miles and Cloward in 1998, then renamed G. parkpinorum by Carpenter et al. in 2001, in accordance with ICZN art. 31.1.2A.

== Description ==
Gargoyleosaurus was a relatively small ankylosaur, reaching 3–3.5 m (9.8–11.5 ft) in length and 300–754 kg (661–1,662 lb) in body mass. Much of the skull and skeleton has been recovered, and the taxon displays cranial sculpturing, including pronounced deltoid quadratojugal and squamosal bosses. The taxon is further characterized by a narrow rostrum (in dorsal view), the presence of seven conical teeth in each premaxilla, an incomplete osseous nasal septum, a linearly arranged nasal cavity, the absence of an osseus secondary palate, and, as regards osteoderms, two sets of co-ossified cervical plates and a number of elongate conical spines. A very unusual feature is the sagittal (midline) osteoderm on the first set of cervical plates; in most other ankylosaurs, these osteoderms are bilateral, i.e. paired with one on each side of the midline.

== Classification ==
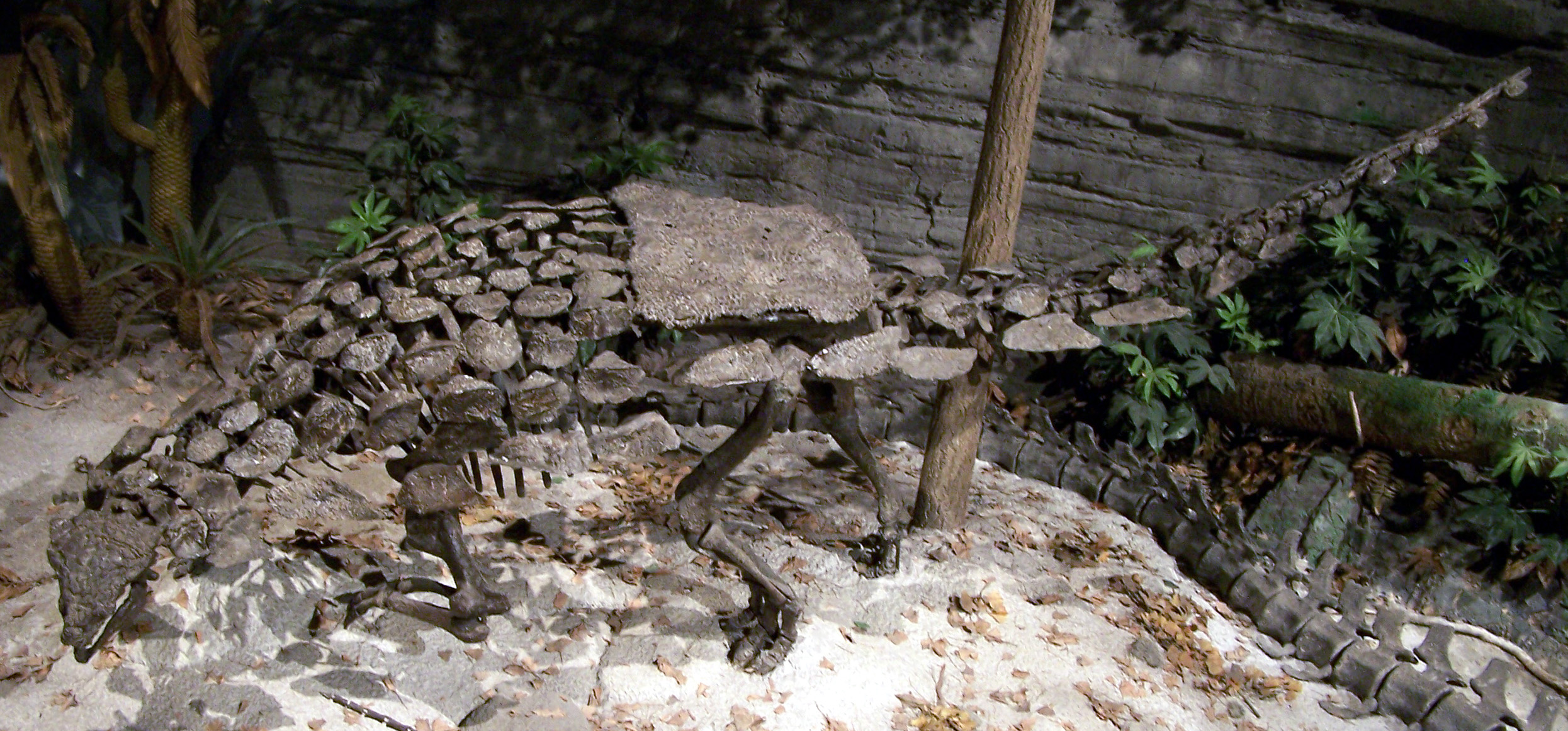
Gargoyleosaurus skeleton cast, Museum of Ancient Life, Thanksgiving Point

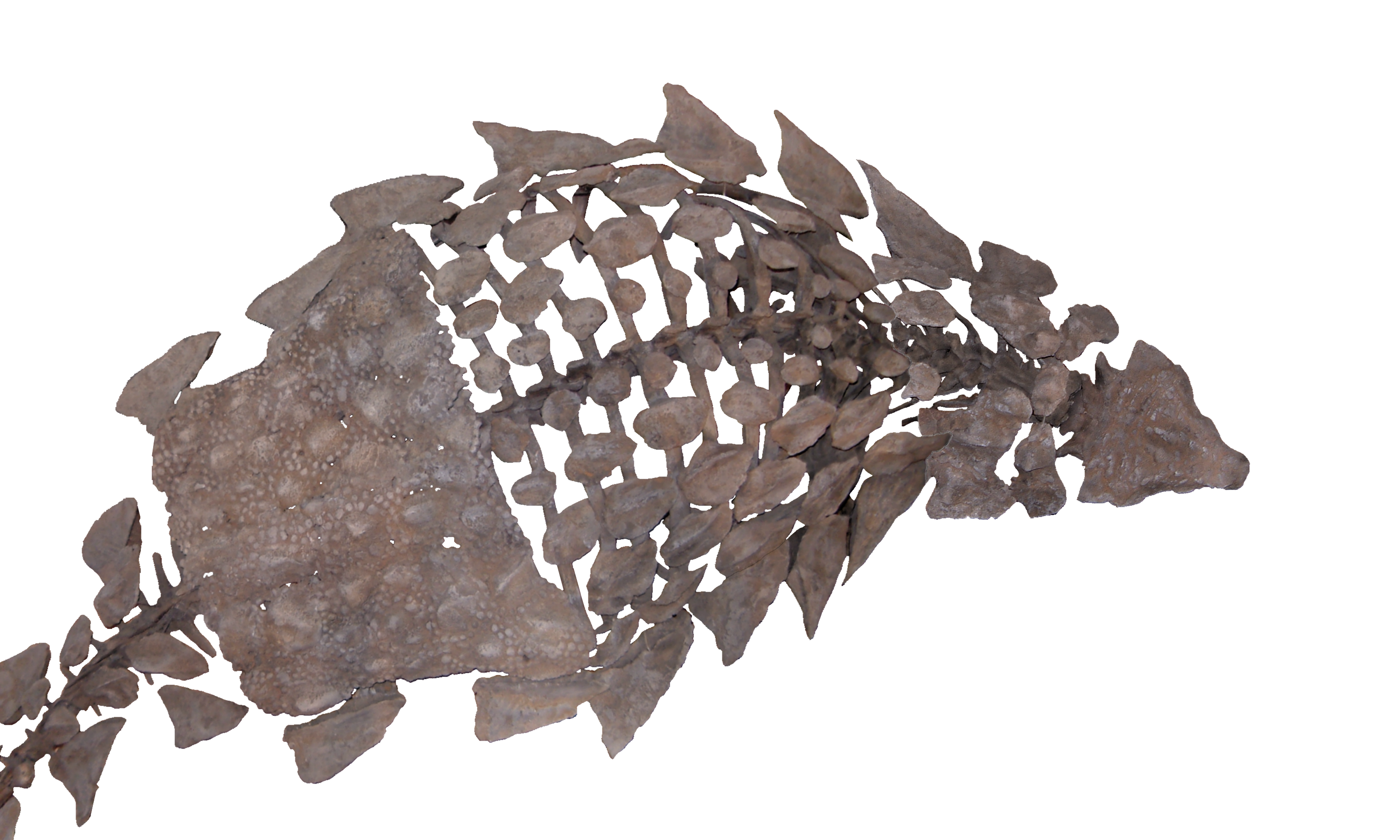
Skeleton of Gargoyleosaurus parkpinorum in top view

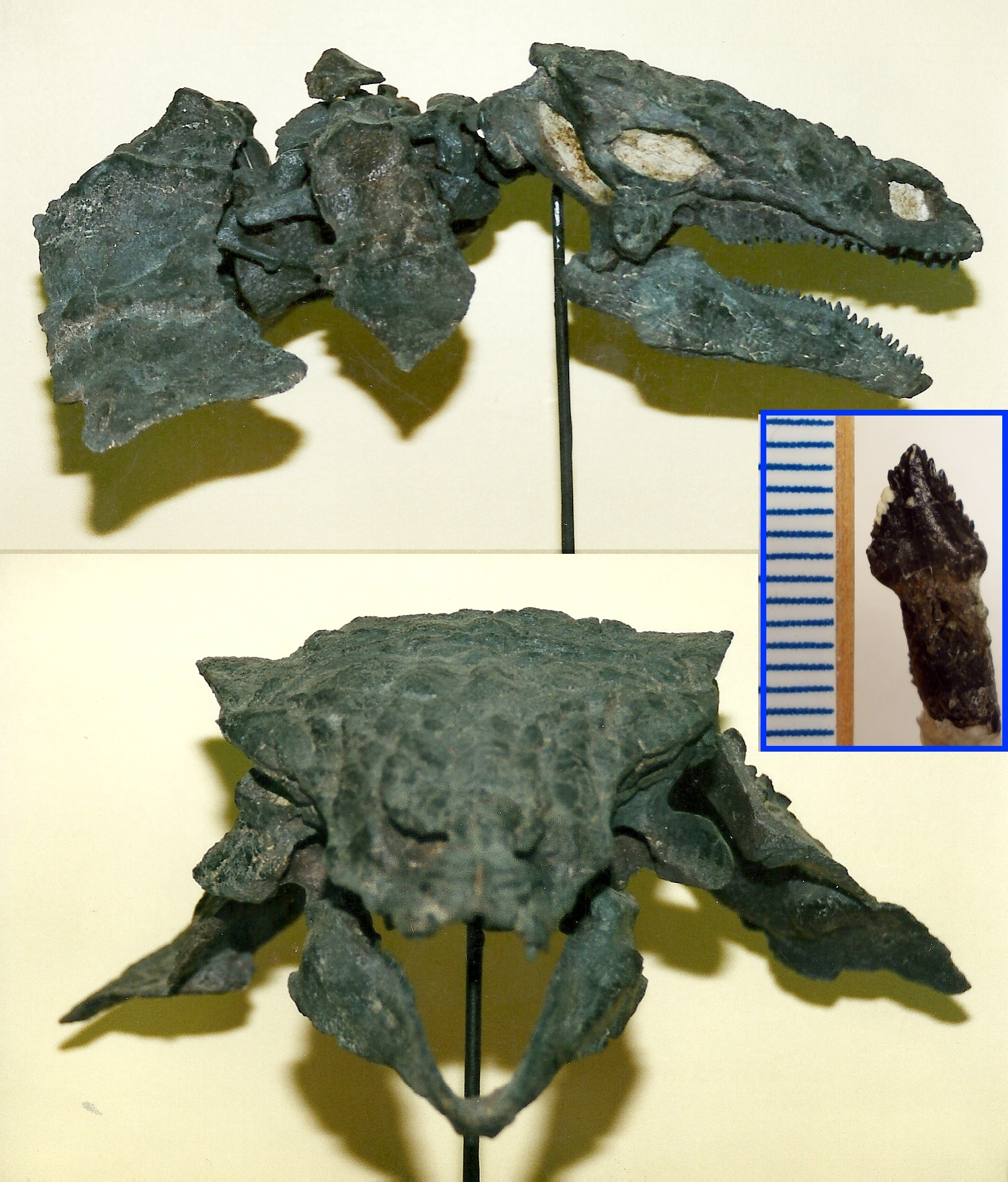
Gargoyleosaurus parkpinorum (DMNH 27726) Skull and cervical armor in side and front view. Insert shows a cheek tooth. The skull is slightly crushed changing the shape of the orbit.

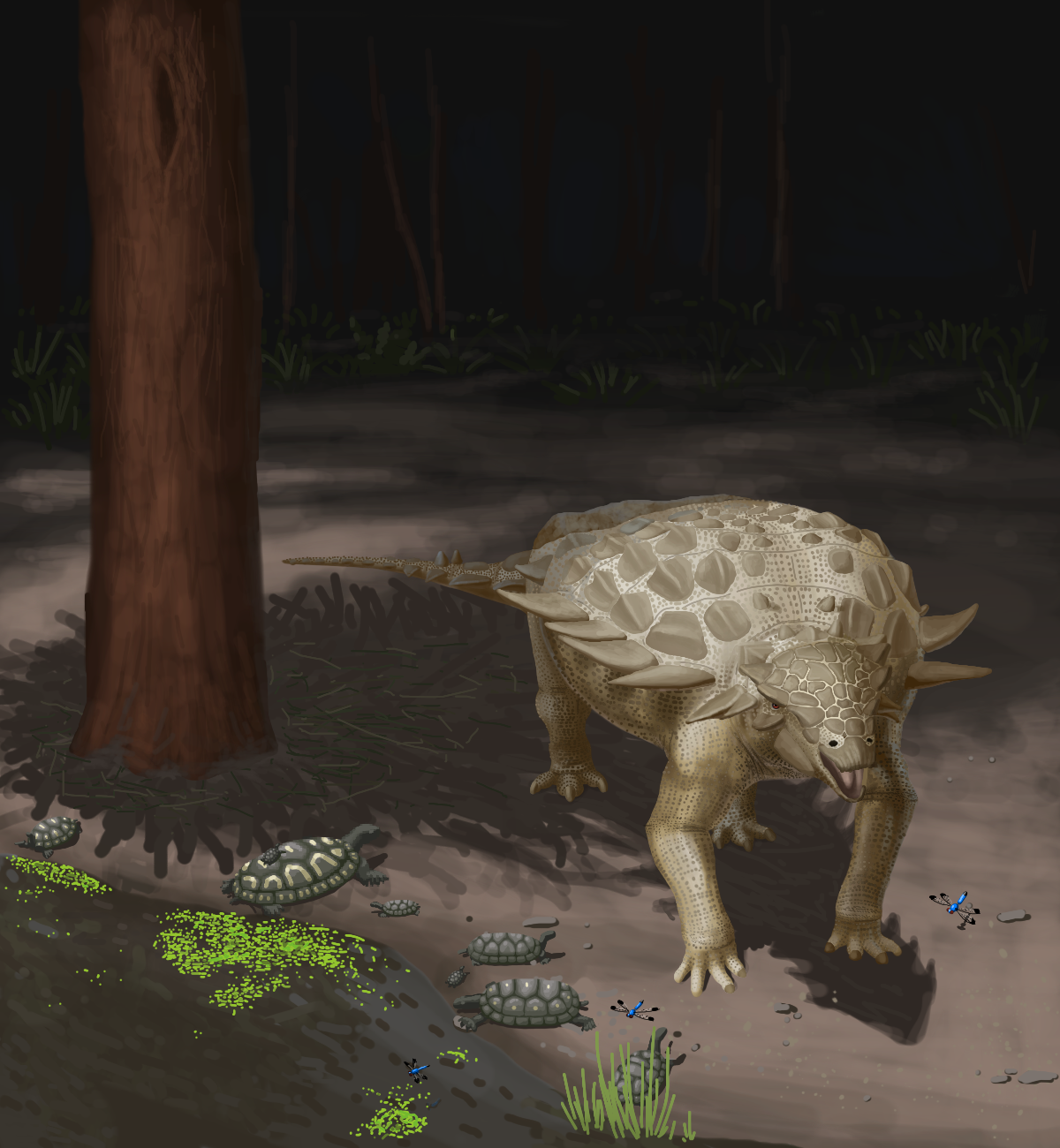
Life restoration

Vickaryous et al. (2004) place Gargoyleosaurus parkpinorum within the family Ankylosauridae of the Ankylosauria and are in agreement with most previous phylogenetic hypotheses, which place the genus as the sister group to all other ankylosaurids (i.e., members of the Ankylosauridae). These studies however, only utilized the skull, whereas many of the distinctive features of the family Polacanthidae are in the postcranial skeleton. In contrast, a phylogenetic analysis by Soto-Acuña and colleagues in 2021 recovered Gargoyleosaurus as a nodosaurid.

Below is a reproduced phylogenetic analysis from Soto-Acuña et al. (2021):

- Thyreophora
  - Scelidosaurus
  - - Stegosauria
    - Ankylosauria
      - Parankylosauria
        - Kunbarrasaurus
        - - Antarctopelta
          - Stegouros
      - Euankylosauria
        - Nodosauridae
          - Cedarpelta
          - Dongyangopelta
          - Gargoyleosaurus
          - Gastonia
          - Hylaeosaurus
          - Mymoorapelta
          - Panoplosaurus
          - Peloroplites
          - Polacanthus
          - Hoplitosaurus
          - Sauroplites
          - Taohelong
          - Nodosaurinae
        - Ankylosauridae
          - Aletopelta
          - - - Chuanqilong
              - Liaoningosaurus
            - - Gobisaurus
              - - Shamosaurus
                - Ankylosaurinae

== See also ==
- Timeline of ankylosaur research
