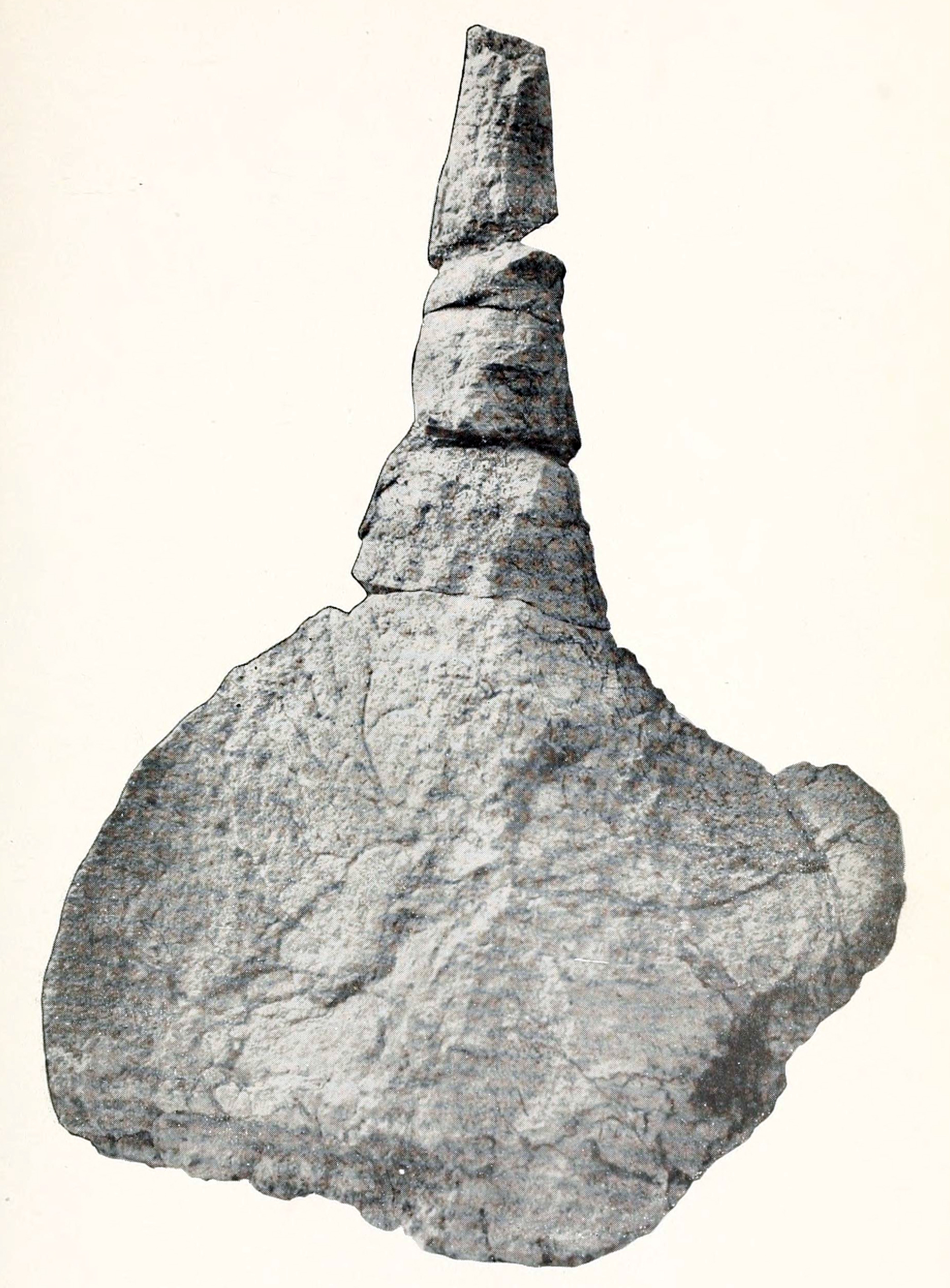
- Spined plate

Scientific classification
- Kingdom: Animalia
- Phylum: Chordata
- Class: Reptilia
- Clade: Dinosauria
- Clade: †Ornithischia
- Clade: †Thyreophora
- Clade: †Ankylosauria
- Family: †Nodosauridae
- Subfamily: †Polacanthinae
- Genus: †Hoplitosaurus; Lucas, 1902

Type species
- Hoplitosaurus marshi Lucas, 1901

= Hoplitosaurus =

Hoplitosaurus Temporal range: Early Cretaceous, 130 Ma

Extinct genus of dinosaurs

Hoplitosaurus (meaning "Hoplite lizard") was a genus of armored dinosaur related to Polacanthus. It was named from a partial skeleton found in the Barremian (Early Cretaceous) Lakota Formation of Custer County, South Dakota. It is an obscure genus which has been subject to some misinterpretation of its damaged remains. Although there was a push to synonymize it with Polacanthus in the late 1980s-early 1990s, Hoplitosaurus has been accepted as a valid albeit poorly known genus in more recent reviews.

== History and Taxonomy ==
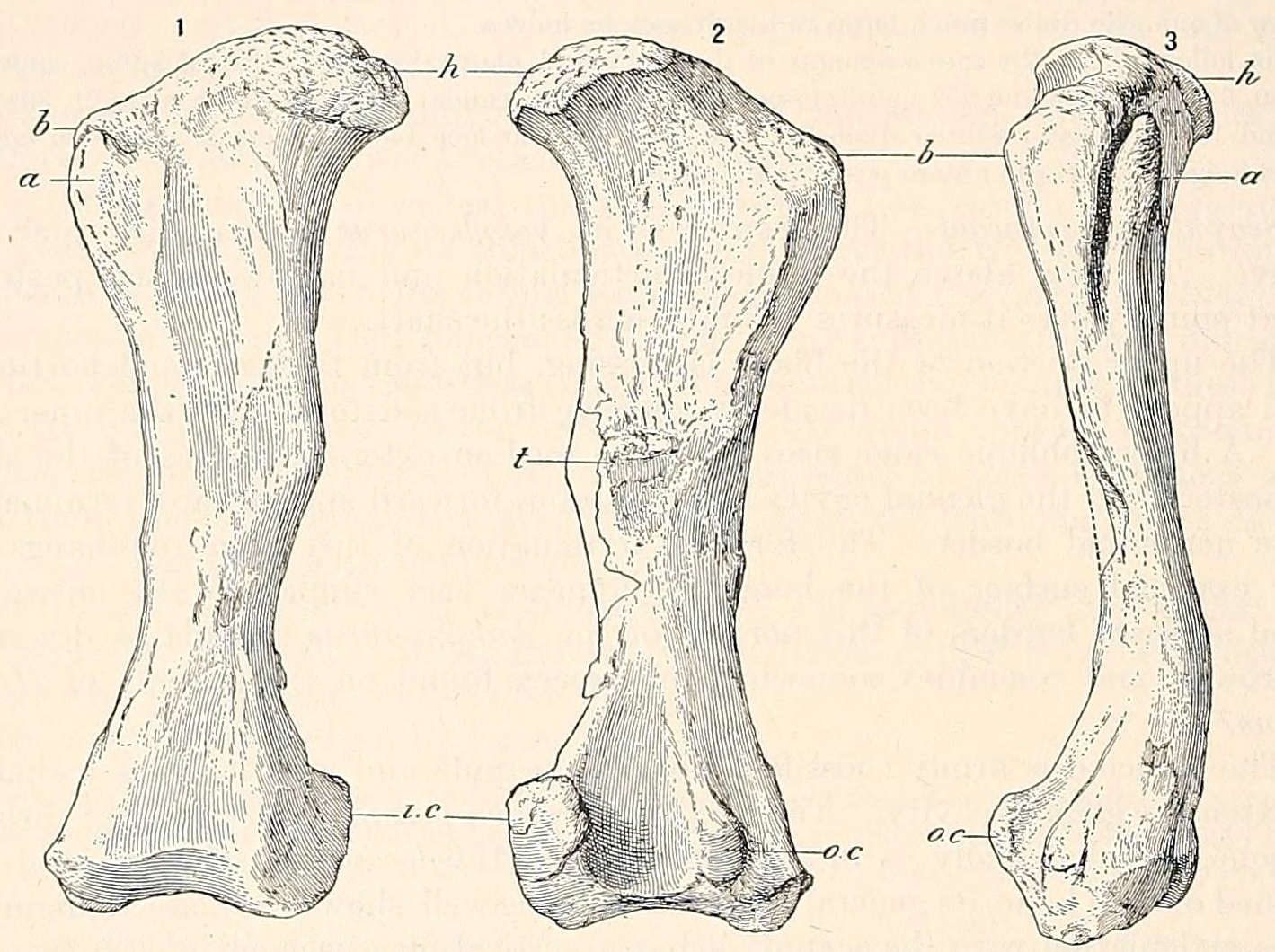
Femur

The holotype specimen, USNM 4752, was discovered in 1898 by Nelson Horatio Darton, near Buffalo Gap Station, and consisted of ribs, caudal vertebrae, part of a right scapulocoracoid, parts of both humeri, a right femur, and a variety of armor (including tall spines). Frederic Augustus Lucas described it briefly in 1901 as a new species of Stegosaurus, but soon gave the material its own genus. Charles W. Gilmore fully described the material in 1914.

William T. Blows and Javier Pereda-Suberbiola both considered the genus to be the same as Polacanthus, creating the new combination Polacanthus marshii, but this has since been rejected. Ken Carpenter and James Kirkland noted that many of the resemblances between the two were more widely distributed among ankylosaurs than previously thought, or were based on damage to the bones, such as some femoral characters.

However, its similarity to Polacanthus has been noted since Lucas renamed it in 1902, the two being most similar in armor, although Hoplitosaurus lacks the sacral shield of armor found in Polacanthus. Today, both are considered to be polacanthine or polacanthid ankylosaurs, depending on classification preference (see for example ), or ankylosaurians of uncertain relationships.

== Paleobiology ==
Gilmore described the animal as being about 1.2 m (4 ft) tall at the hips. It would have been a quadrupedal herbivore, eating low to the ground; armor was its main defense.

Blows (2001) reconsidered the armor in light of new data on polacanthine dinosaurs, and found it to fall into the following categories:

- Pectoral spines
- Presacral spines
- Splates (spine+plate) from the sacral region
- Tall, asymmetric, hollow-based caudal plates
- Small to large solid-based, ridged ossicles (filling spaces)

== See also ==
- Timeline of ankylosaur research
