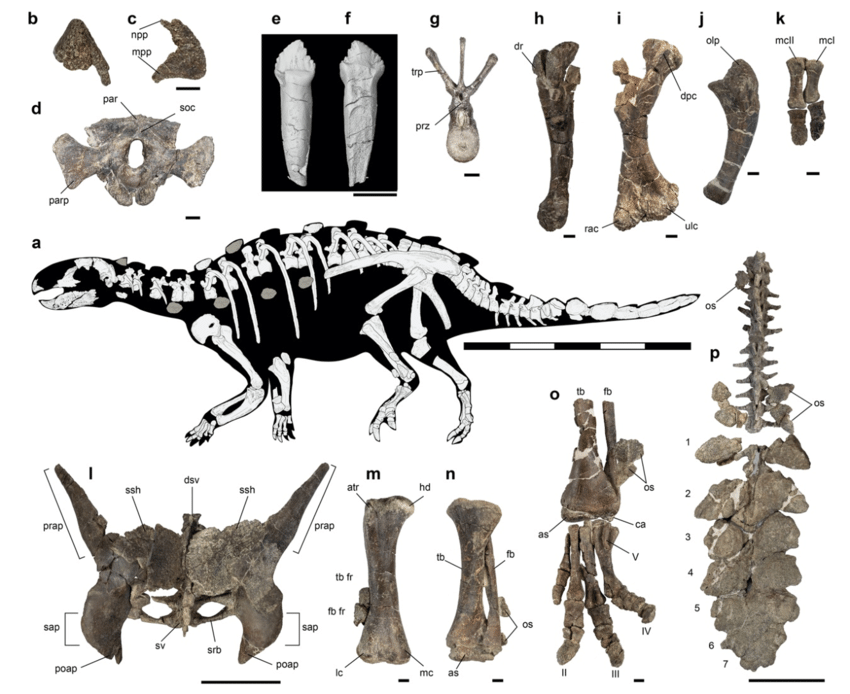
- Fossil material of Stegouros, a parankylosaur

Scientific classification
- Kingdom: Animalia
- Phylum: Chordata
- Class: Reptilia
- Clade: Dinosauria
- Clade: †Ornithischia
- Clade: †Thyreophora
- Clade: †Ankylosauria (?)
- Clade: †Parankylosauria; Soto-Acuña et al., 2021

Genera
- †Antarctopelta; †Kunbarrasaurus; †Minmi; †Patagopelta; †Stegouros

= Parankylosauria =

Parankylosaurs Temporal range: Cretaceous, 105–70 Ma

Extinct group of armored dinosaurs

Parankylosauria is a group of armored dinosaurs that inhabited the Southern Hemisphere during the Cretaceous period. First proposed as a distinct clade in 2021, they are thought to be an early diverging branch of the ankylosaur lineage. While most ankylosaurs (members of Euankylosauria) are found in the Northern Hemisphere, ankylosaur discoveries in the Southern hemisphere are rare and often fragmentary. They have been found in South America, Antarctica, and Australia, which were partially united into the supercontinent of Gondwana at the time. The 2018 discovery of a relatively complete skeleton later named as the genus Stegouros was a key development in understanding the evolutionary link between Gondwanan ankylosaurs.

Compared to other ankylosaurs, parankylosaurs were rather small in size (1.5–4.0 metres (4.9–13.1 ft)) and retained a number of primitive traits shared with early armoured dinosaurs and stegosaurs but lost in euankylosaurs. Though only a few species are known, they seem to show anatomical diversity, with some species being small and lightly built and others being more robust and heavily armoured. Their skulls, like other ornithischians, possessed both beaks and teeth, and had relatively elongate snouts with distinct narrow nasal bones. The complex ornamentation and horns of other ankylosaur skulls appear absent in parankylosaurs. Their bodies were more primitive than their skulls, with vertebral characteristics shared with stegosaurs and simple, small pelvic regions distingushing them from euankylosaurs. Parankylosaur legs were relatively long and their feet were slender, with some species possessing hoof-like nails and others claws. Their tail vertebrae were wide and flat, and some parankylosaurs possessed shortened tails surrounded by large osteoderms that formed a weapon structure called a "macuahuitl", in reference to the Mesoamerican weapon. Smaller osteoderms were embedded across the body to form armor, with some species possessing prominent spikes and others having reduced their armor to simply rows of small oval structures.

Before the discovery of Stegouros, the relationships of Gondwanan ankylosaurs to other ankylosaurs was unclear, and inconsistent between analyses. When Parankylosauria was proposed in 2021, it was found to represent the first lineage to branch off from the rest of Ankylosauria. Consequently, Parankylosauria must have originated during the Middle Jurassic despite their fossil record being restricted to the Cretaceous period. It has been cladistically defined as "the largest clade containing Stegouros elengassen, but not Ankylosaurus magniventris and Nodosaurus textilis". Some studies have disputed the existence of Parankylosauria as a natural grouping, instead considering its proposed members to be distantly related. However, several studies have accepted the clade and the 2021 results have been replicated in multiple distinct phylogenetic analyses using distinct datasets. Uncertainties remain as to whether Parankylosauria truly belongs in Ankylosauria or is instead an earlier branching part of the armoured dinosaur lineage.

== History of research ==
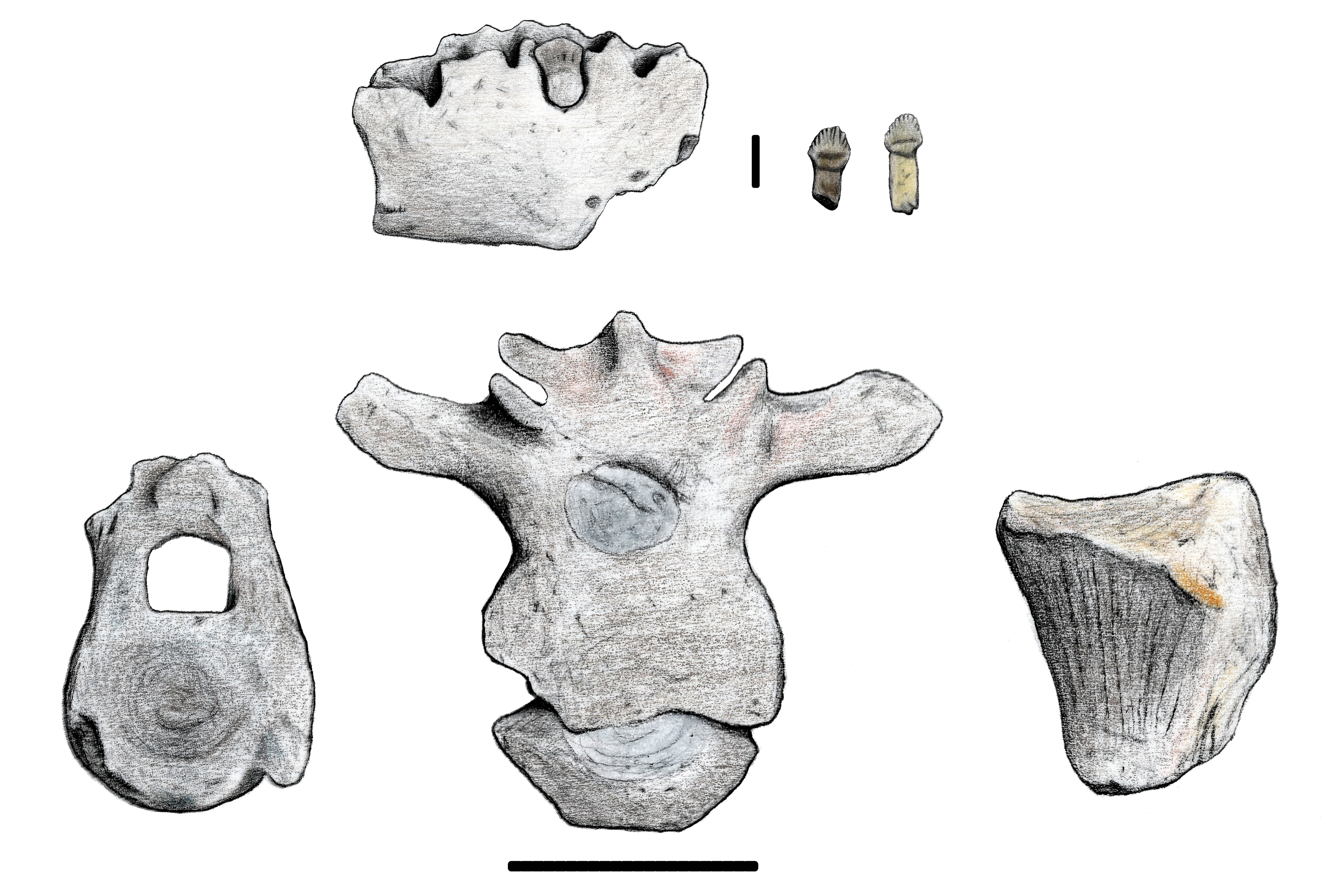
Fossils remains of the parankylosaur Antarctopelta; early discoveries of ankylosaurs in the Southern continents were often fragmentary.

During the Mesozoic era, the southern continents (South America, Antarctica, Australia, and Africa in addition to India and Zealandia) were unified into a supercontinent known as Gondwana. This was in contrast to the supercontinent of Laurasia in the Northern Hemisphere, with both originating from the breakup of Pangaea. Gondwana itself gradually split apart over the course of the Jurassic and Cretaceous eras. Ankylosaurian dinosaurs from Laurasia have historically been far more extensively recorded and studied. Reports of the group in Gondwana date back to 1904, with a specimen from Australia and include referrals of Loricosaurus, Lametasaurus, and Brachypodosaurus to group among assorted fragmentary material. Much of this material was later shown to be misidentified and not belonging to ankylosaurs, including the named genera. The first definitive ankylosaur to be recognized from Gondwana was discovered in Australia in 1964 and named in 1980 as Minmi paravertebra.

Ankylosaurs from Gondwana have remained mysterious. Fossil material continues to be scant, and southern taxa have been difficult to interpret in a phylogenetic context. In 1986, a fragmentary ankylosaur specimen was found on James Ross Island in Antarctica, and was later named as the genus Antarctopelta. Its vertebrae were poorly preserved and so foreign compared to those of euankylosaurs that it was at times questioned if they might instead belong to a marine reptile, in which case the specimen would be a chimera. In 1989 a better preserved Australian ankylosaur specimen was discovered that would initially be considered another specimen of Minmi before being named as the distinct genus Kunbarrasaurus in 2015. Beyond these two genera, the record was limited to fragmentary remains in Australia and South America. The possibility of a biogeographic connection between South America and ankylosaurs in Australia was raised, though based on conjecture. The concept that these southern ankylosaurs formed a distinct lineage from Northern ones as part of an endemic Gondwanan fauna had been suspected, but difficult to confirm due to a lack of material.

A more complete specimen discovered in 2018 and described as the new genus Stegouros in 2021 showed that there was a previously unrecognized monophyletic grouping of these southern ankylosaur taxa. The study naming the genus, by Sergio Soto-Acuña and colleagues, coined Parankylosauria based on Stegouros, Antarctopelta, and Kunbarrasaurus. The name, referencing its parent group, means "at the side of Ankylosauria". Whether or not all known Gondwana ankylosaurs belong to the group remains unclear. Patagopelta, for example, was described from Argentina in 2022 as a member of the North American lineage Nodosauridae. This would suggest that in addition to the more ancient Parankylosauria, more derived euankylosaurians also inhabited South America, having migrated from North America as part of a biotic interchange during the Campanian. However, more recent studies have disputed this and suggested a parankylosaur affinity for Patagopelta.

== Anatomy ==
Size of four named parankylosaurians compared to a human

Known members of Parankylosauria are all small animals of various sizes, ranging from 1.5–4.0 metres (4.9–13.1 ft). Compared to euankylosaurians, they retained traits seen in primitive thyreophorans as well as the related stegosaurs. Their bodies, in particular, have a number of primitive traits, whereas typical ankylosaur skull traits were acquired early in the group's evolution and thus shared between lineages. Proportionally they were characterized by longer limbs and in some cases shorter tails than those seen in other ankylosaurs. Like other ankylosaurs they possessed armor across their bodies, made up of various small osteoderms (bones embedded in the skin), and a reinforced sheet of bone known as a pelvic shield over the hips, and a tail weapon. The latter in parankylosaurs is known as a macuahuitl, named after the mesoamerican weapon of the same name, and consisted of a series of osteoderms along both sides of the tail rather than a singular localized club or thagomizer at the end of the tail. Multiple different bodyplans appear to have been present within the group. Genera like Stegouros and Antarctopelta show smaller size and a lighter build with reduced armor. Others like Patagopelta and Kunbarrasaurus were most robust, more heavily adorned in armor and covered in a more diverse array of osteoderms.

=== Skull ===
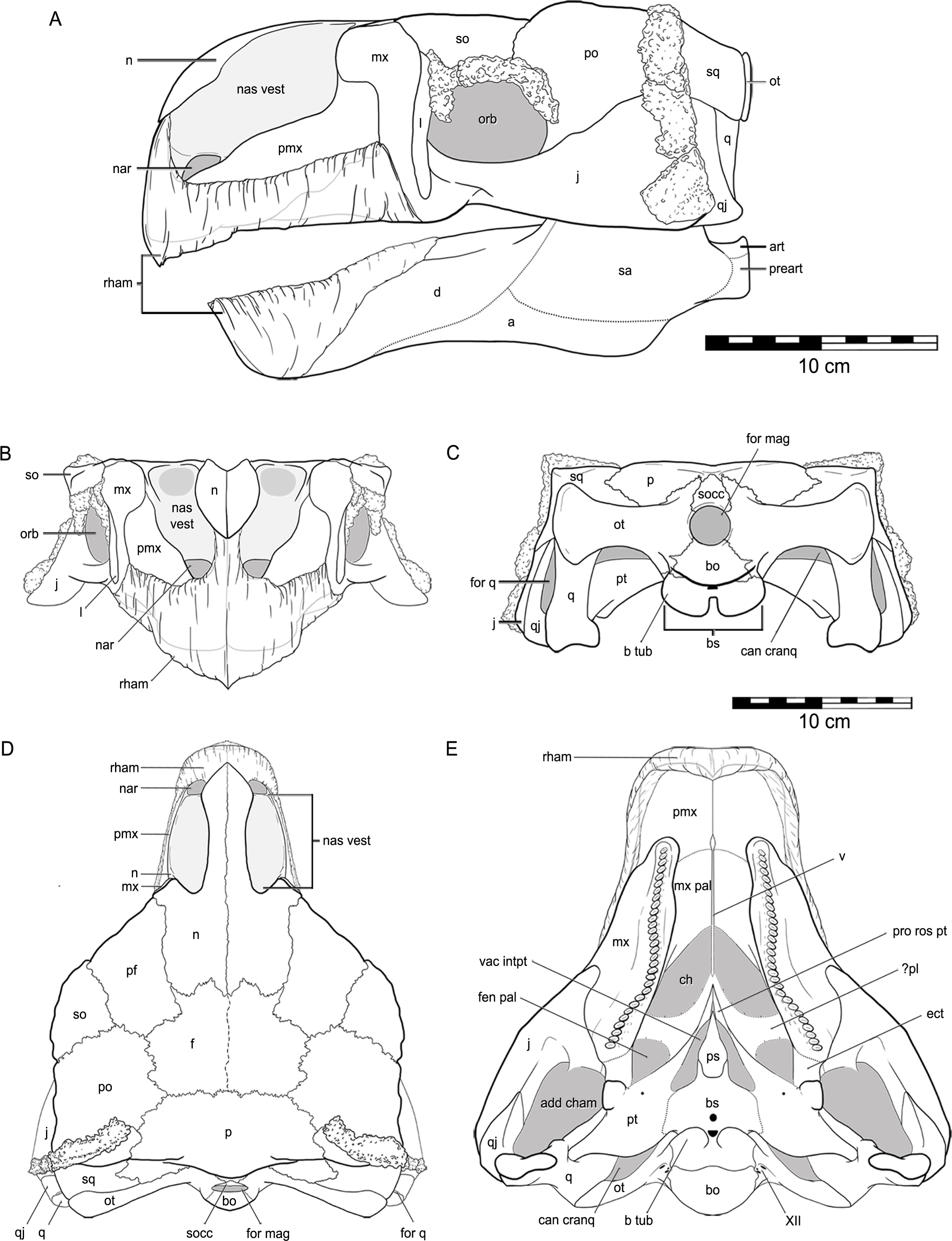
Skull diagram of Kunbarrasaurus

As with other ankylosaurs, the detailed skull anatomy of parankylosaurs is difficult to appreciate due to bone sheets depositing over the sutures between skull elements. The skulls of at least some species seem to have been proportionally large. Unlike other ankylosaurs, skulls of parankylosaurs are composed of largely unfused bones which are rather thin. Unlike early armored dinosaurs, their skulls are textured with various ridges, pits, and grooves. However, they lack the more elaborate skull ornamentation seen in many other ankylosaurs. Known parankylosaurs lack spines, horns, bosses, or pyramidal protrusions, instead having simplistic unadorned skulls. Kunbarrasaurus does possess thick eye ridges formed by the postorbital bone, but this is lacking in other genera such as Patagopelta. A mosaic sulci network divides this unornamented surface into various polygonal sections.

A distinct, uniting trait of parankylosaurs are the narrow and elongate nasals, which are restricted to the top surface of the skull. These form part of a relatively elongate snout. At the front of the snout was a large beak, similar to that of other ankylosaurs. The maxillae, holding the teeth in the upper jaw, are oriented so as to strongly diverse in the back, unlike other ankylosaurs. The teeth themselves are, in general, dissimilar to those of ankylosaurids and instead very similar to those of nodosaurs. Their teeth have large denticles (coarse protuberances along the cutting edges), a crown (the exposed peak of the tooth) with a high position compared to the root (anchor of the tooth in the jaw), and a cingulum (shelf-like bulge near the base of the tooth) that was large and asymmetrically shaped. This anatomy differs somewhat between species, with the earlier genus Kunbarrasaurus having larger, more coarse and deeply grooved denticles and the Late Cretaceous genus Patagopelta having finer, shorter ones. These teeth do not occupy a distinct morphotype from those of other ankylosaurs.

=== Torso ===
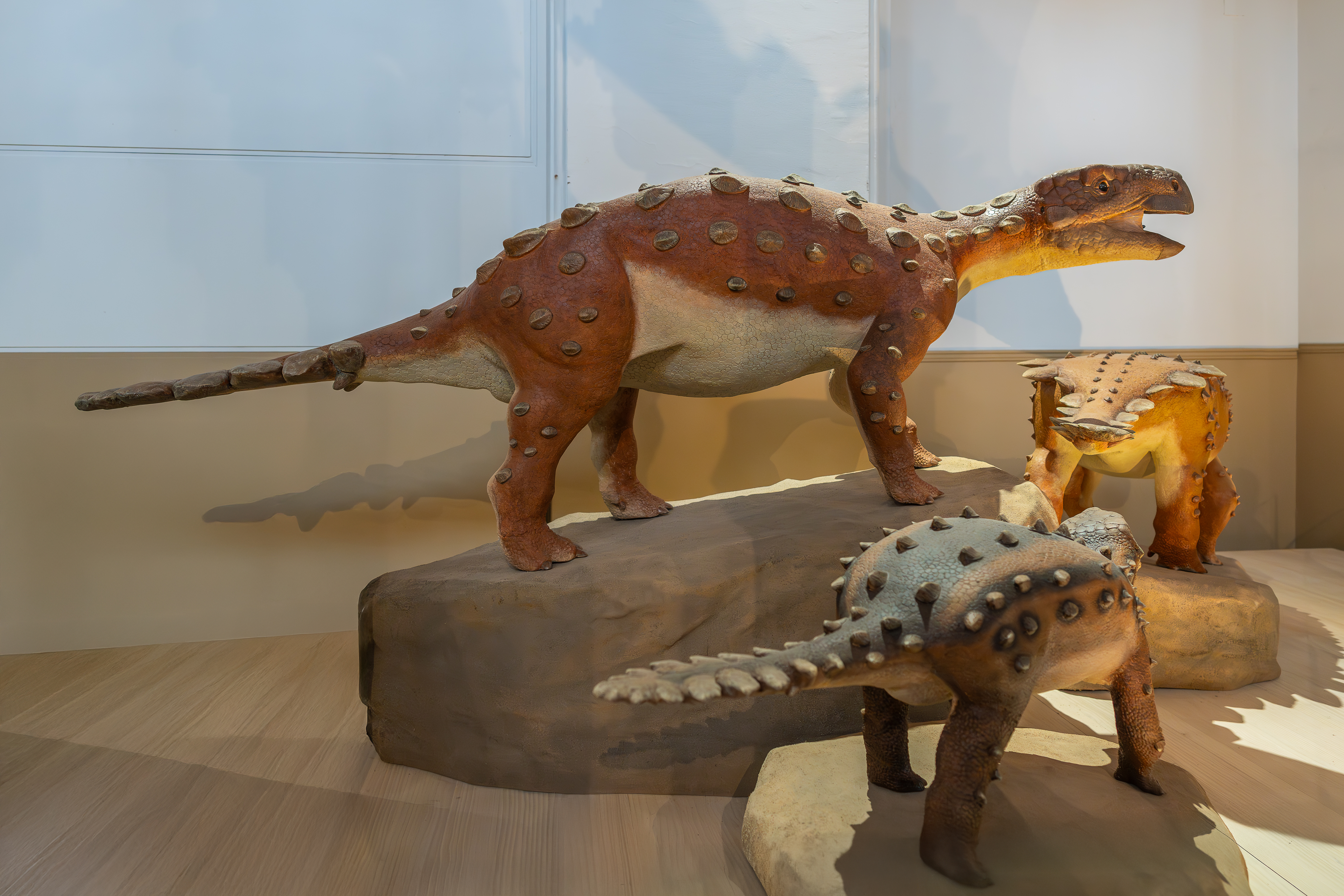
Reconstructed models of Antarctopelta at the Chilean National Museum of Natural History

In general, the torso of parankylosaurs is similar to the primitive armored dinosaur condition, contrasting with the derived anatomy seen in euankylosaurs. Several traits are shared with stegosaurs, the sister group of ankylosaurs, rather than with other ankylosaurs. This may be indicative of ancestral traits of the two lineages, retained in stegosaurs and parankylosaurs bust lost in other ankylosaurs. The dorsal (back) vertebrae have elongate centra (the cylindrical center of the vertebra) and high, compressed neural arches (the structure mounted above the centrum, surrounding the spinal cord) similar to those of stegosaurs. The prezygapophyses (forward projections to attach one vertebra to the next) were fused into a short, U-shaped wedge; this is also shared with stegosaurs. Near the back of the dorsal column, the postzygapophyses (equivalent backward projections) are also fused together. These back vertebrae were not fused to their respective ribs; fused ribs were traditionally considered a uniting trait of ankylosaurs, but are in fact unfused in some basal forms.

Unlike other ankylosaurs, the sacrum, forming the centre of the pelvis, was small, simple, and narrow. On either side, the ilia were primitive and similar to stegosaurs and unlike other ankylosaurs in several respects. The overall shape was long and low (rather than large and subrectangular as in euankylosaurs), the hip socket opened downwards, the forward-projecting preacetabular process was relatively short, and the backward-projecting postacetabular process was elongate. A thin layer of dermal bone covers the sacrum, reinforcing the pelvis with a "pelvic shield". This is superficially similar to that seen in stegosaurs, formed by the sacral vertebrae themselves, while the pelvic shield of other ankylosaurs is made up of fused osteoderms that cover both the sacrum and the ilium (sides of the pelvis). None of the vertebrae of the tail associate with the sacrum to form sacrocaudals, unlike some other ankylosaurs. Like other ankylosaurs, some taxa possessed ossified tendons (tendons turned to bone) along the backbone. Those of Minmi, including some ending in wide bony sheets (ossified aponeuroses) only otherwise known in Hungarosaurus, have been given the term paravertebrae by some authors.

The limbs of parankylosaurs were relatively long and slender, as were the metatarsals of the hind feet. Both stegosaurs and euankylosaurs, contrastingly, have stout limbs and broad feet. Instead, the parankylosaur condition is more similar to very early armored dinosaurs. In Patagopelta the feet had hoof-like nails, whereas in the earlier Kunbarrasaurus the feet possessed claws.

=== Tail ===
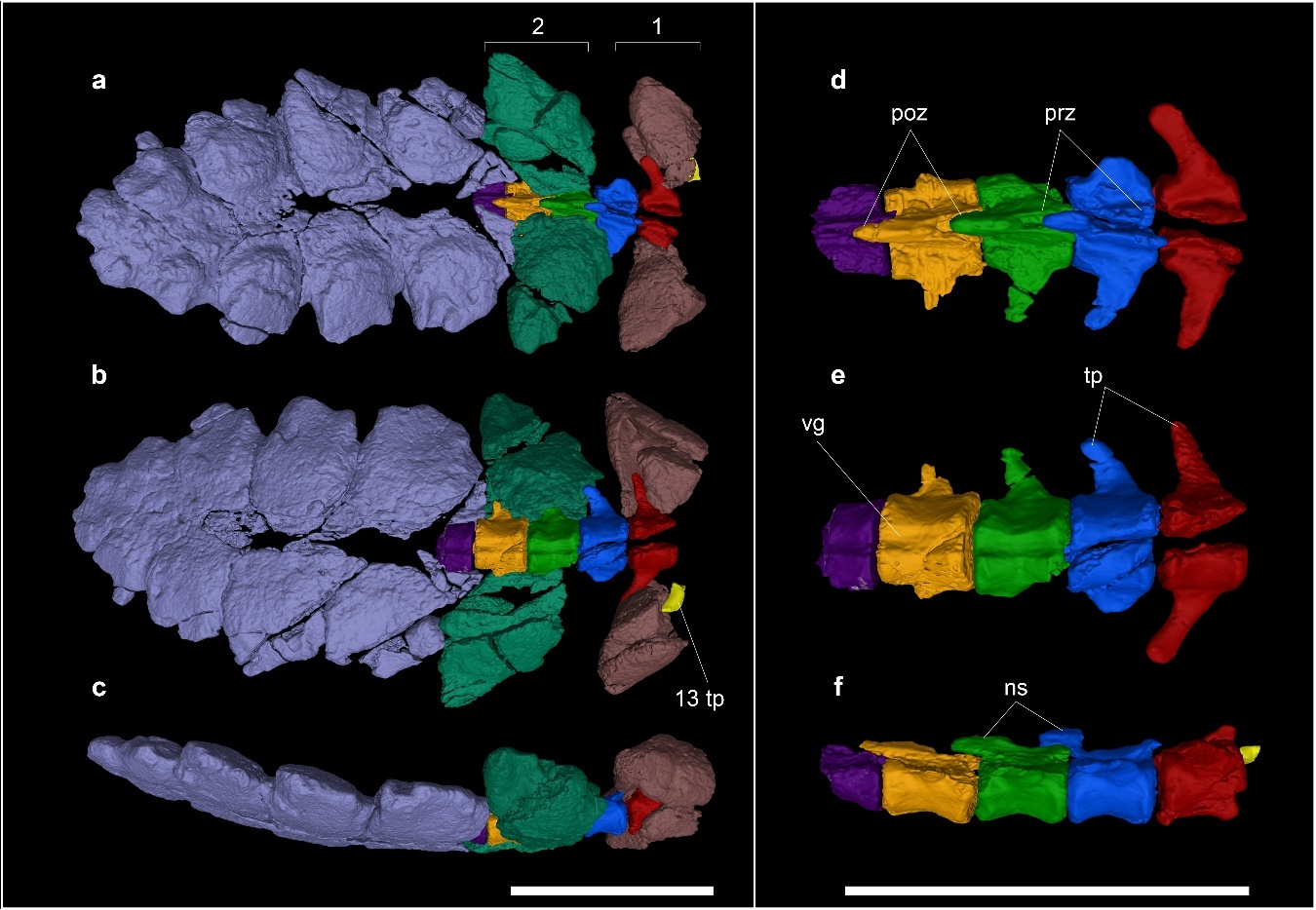
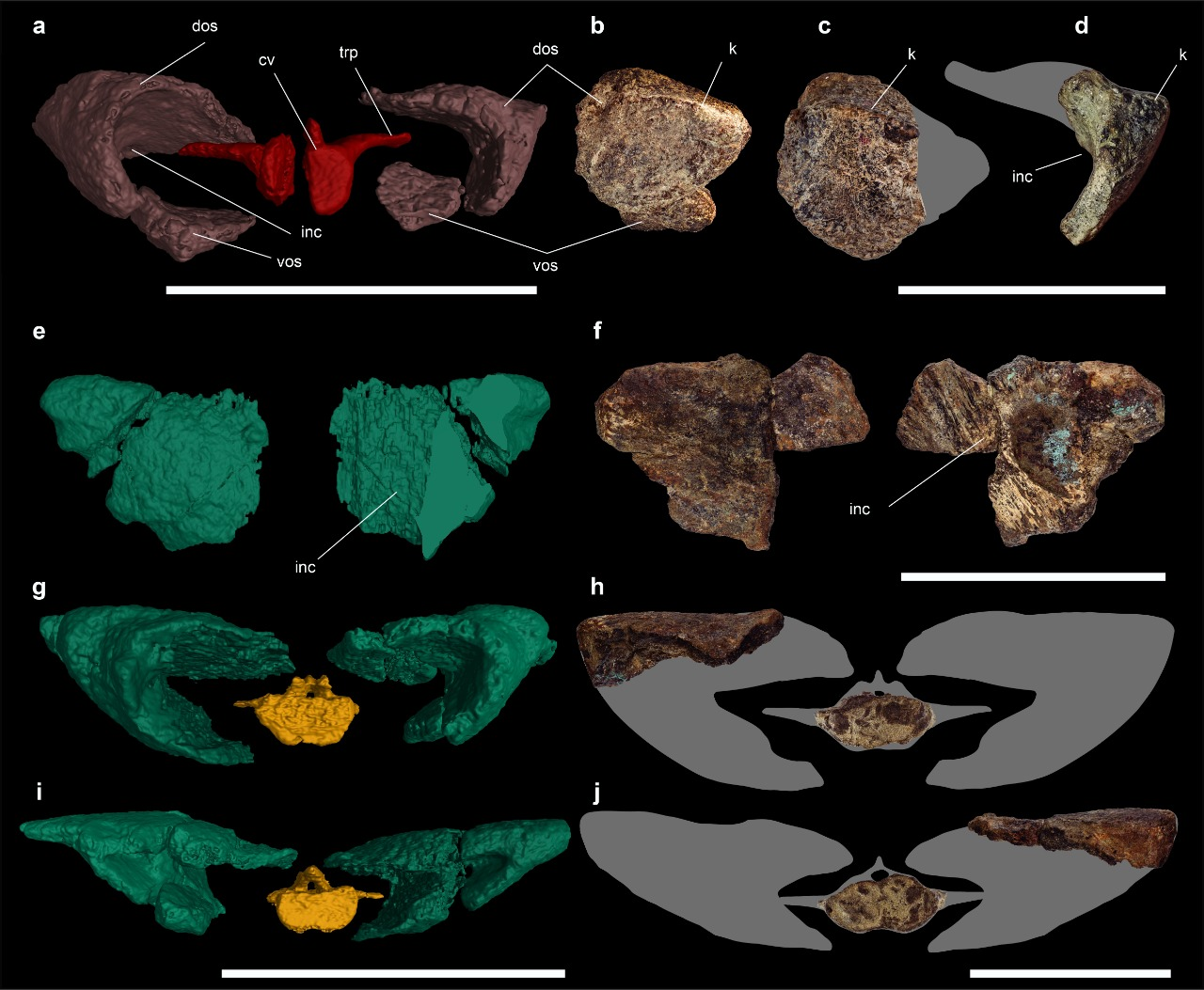
Complete macuahuitl structure of Stegouros (left) and closeup of osteoderm structure and articulation with tail vertebrae in Stegouros and Antarctopelta (right)

Tail (or caudal) vertebrae of parankylosaurs are highly distinct. Those near the base of the tail are short front-to-back and expanded in width. A faint groove runs along the bottom of each vertebra. Those in the middle of the tail are simple and box-shaped. Most uniquely, the vertebrae near the end of the tail are flattened (more than twice as wide as tall), with a large bottom groove cleaving the shape of the vertebra into a "binocular" shape with two sides. The transverse processes (projections to either side from the top of the vertebrae) have been reduced entirely into long ridges that reach to the end of the centrum. In other ankylosaurs, these processes are reduced to nubs at the back of the tail. Thus, from the front of the tip of the tail, the centra increase in length but decrease in height. At least some parankylosaurs had shortened tails; Stegouros has an estimated count of 26 tail vertebrae, the lowest known in any armored dinosaur. Unlike derived ankylosaurids, which stiffen their tails using elongated, overlapping prezygapophyses, parankylosaurs possess short prezygapophyses on their tail vertebrae and stiffening is instead achieved through the surrounding cover of osteoderms. Likewise, the tails of parankylosaurs do not show vertebral fusion as is seen in ankylosaurids to support their large tail slabs.

Similar to many armored dinosaurs, at least some parankylosaurs possessed weapons at the ends of their tails. While stegosaurs possessed spiked thagomizers and ankylosaurines possessed tail clubs at the end of the tail, parankylosaurs possessed a structure known as macuahuitl. This consisted of a frond-like pattern of several osteoderms arranged on each side of the entire back half of the tail. The flattened vertebrae from the end of the tail would have functioned to support this structure. The spines forming the macuahuitl, which have been described as "pup tent" shaped, have an elongated base with a large depression, a tapering shape ending with a sharp outward keel, and are uniformly flattened. Together, this gives the shape of a flat funnel, and the base fits in along each side of each tail vertebra. Similar osteoderms are known in Yuxisaurus, traditionally considered an early diverging armored dinosaur but potentially related to parankylosaurs. In Stegouros this macuahuitl structure begins after the fourteenth tail vertebra, and preserved osteoderms of Antarctopleta and Patagopelta indicate similar anatomy. The end of the tail is unknown in earlier parankylosaurs such as Kunbarrasaurus.

=== Armor ===
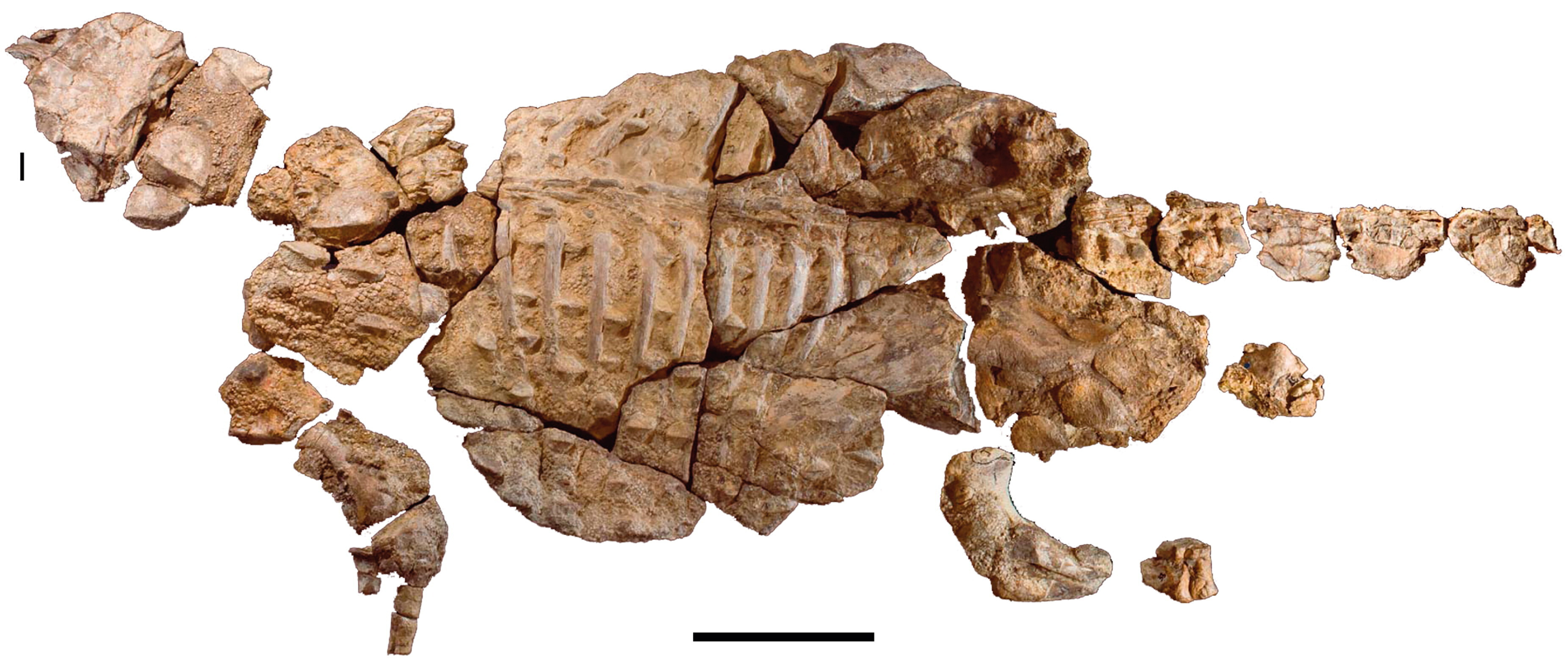
Skeleton of Kunbarrasaurus, showing rows of osteoderm along the torso

Like other armored dinosaurs, parankylosaurs had small bones known as osteoderms embedded in the skin across their necks, backs, limbs, and tails. While that along the end of the tail formed a tail weapon, other osteoderms adorned the body in armor and spikes. Larger osteoderms were arranged in patterns distinct to each species, whereas abundant arrays of tiny osteoderms known as ossicles filled in the space between them, particularly in the thorax and tail regions. Some of these ossicles possess a patern of striae (grooves) at right angles, unique to the ossicles of parankylosaurs. In Minmi and Kunbarrasaurus these ossicles were also present along the underside of the animals, whereas these were lacking in other genera such as Patagopelta.

The diversity of larger osteoderms also varied between species. Stegouros, a small and lightly built parankylosaur, had seemingly reduced armor, with limited flank armor and simple rows of small ovular osteoderms along the back. Rings of armor encircling the neck may have been absent in Stegouros and Antarctopelta, seemingly being secondarily lost compared to their inferred presence in ancestral ankylosaurs. By comparison, some parankylosaurs such Patagopelta and related animals such as Minmi and Kunbarrasaurus possessed several different forms of osteoderm. Multiple rings of bone were present around the neck, with multiple large osteoderms fused around each. An assortment of large elliptical, keeled, and spiked osteoderms were arranged along the top of the back and the sides of the torso. Behind this, a pavement of osteoderms covered the pelvic shield, with series of conical spikes fused to the same base. In Patagopelta, some of these form paired structures with a "binocular" base and two spikes, only otherwise observed in the euankylosaur Hungarosaurus. The largest spikes would have been directly over the hips, with smaller scutes present along the side. Also present around the hips and base of the tail were the largest osteoderms on the body. Elongated scutes would have run along the tail, while the largest osteoderms on the body were arranged along the side of the tail. These were flattened plate-like structures, with a triangular shape ending in a spike. Potentially overlapping with each other, these are reminiscent of structures found in euankylosaurs such as Sauropelta.

== Classification ==
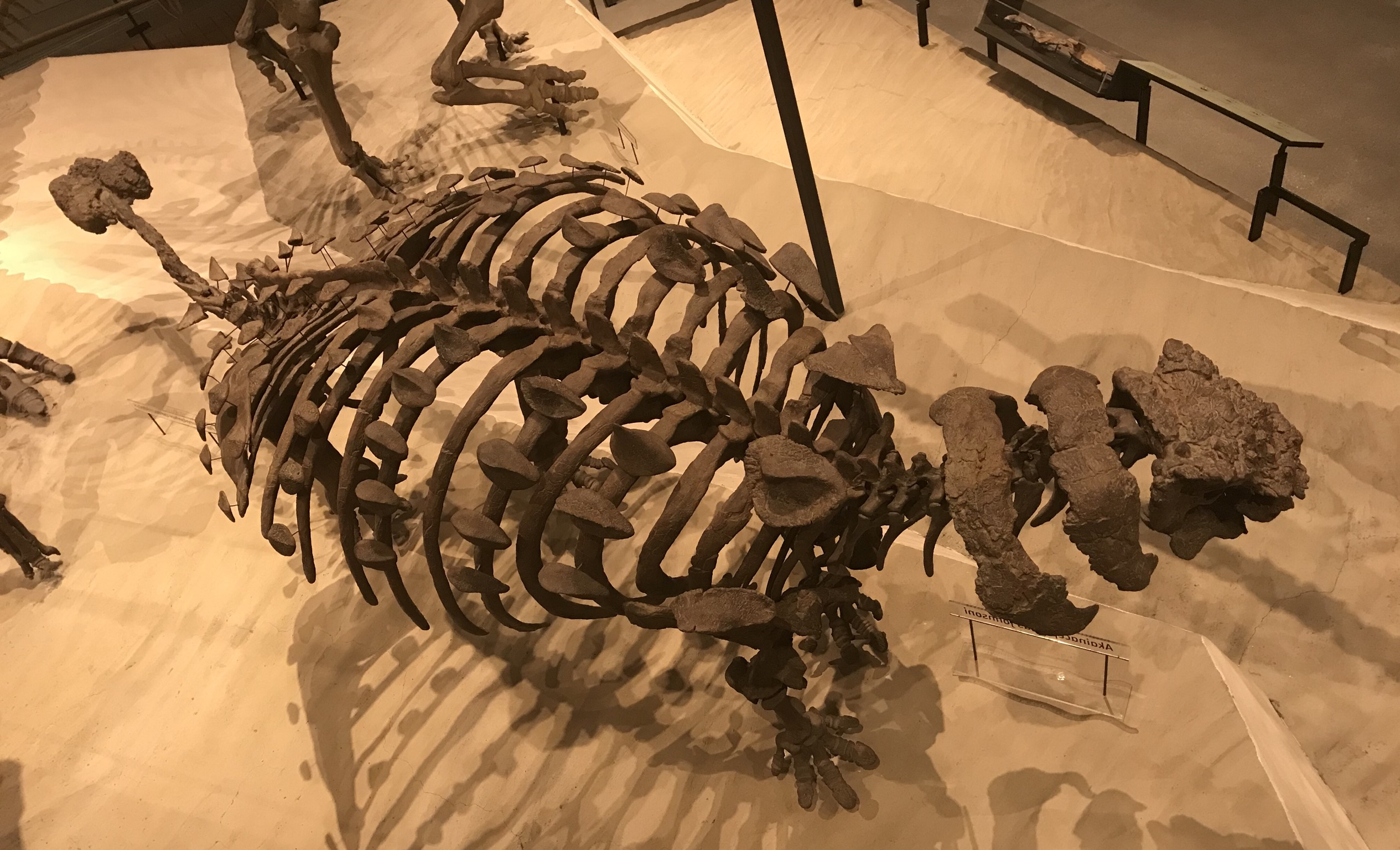
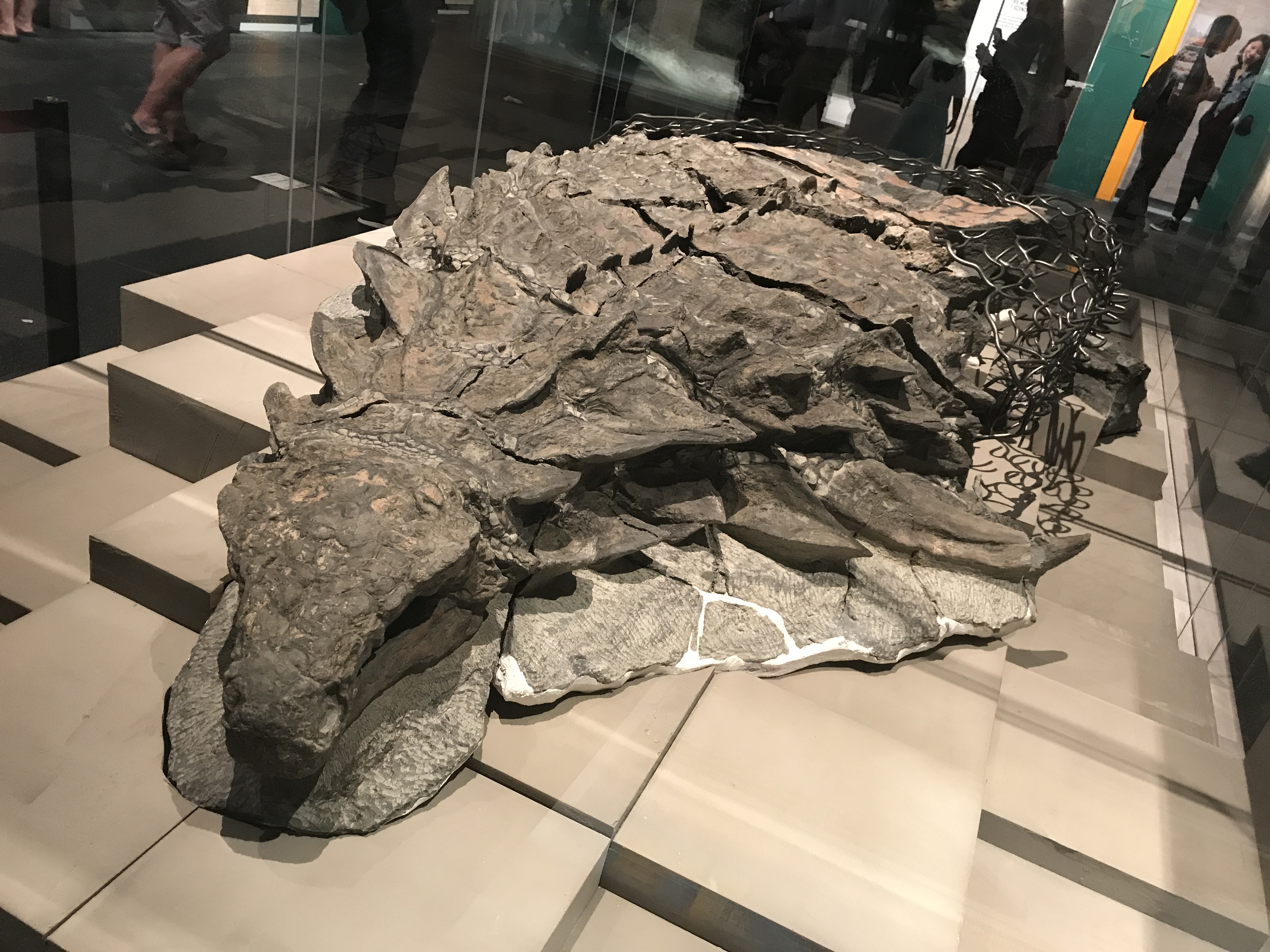
Parankylosaurs are thought to be close relatives of the euankylosaurs, such as Ankylosauridae (left, Akainacephalus) and Nodosauridae (right, Borealopelta)

Parankylosauria is a lineage of ornithischian dinosaurs belonging to the group Thyreophora, known as the armored dinosaurs, and are typically considered an early diverging lineage of Ankylosauria. Before the discovery of Stegouros, the phylogenetic positions of Gondwana ankylosaurs were unclear. Minmi was initially considered a possible nodosaurid, and later typically considered either an early ankylosaurid or an early-diverging ankylosaur outside of both Ankylosauridae and Nodosauridae. Antarctopelta, likewise, was initially considered an ankylosaurid before later being regarded as a nodosaurid and noted for its mixture of ankylosaurid and nodosaurid features. In a 2021 study by Sergio Soto-Acuña and colleagues, the new genus Stegorous was united with Kunbarrasaurus and Antarctopleta outside of the grouping of ankylosaurids and nodosaurids. This clade was named Parankylosauria, and found to be the sister group to all other ankylosaurs (which were termed Euankylosauria), implying the group originated in the Middle Jurassic. Parankylosauria was defined as all taxa closer to Stegourous than to Ankylosaurus. A 2024 study of ornithischian relationships by André Fonseca and colleagues found support for Parankylosauria and formally defined it under PhyloCode nomenclature, adjusting the definition to "the largest clade containing Stegouros elengassen, but not Ankylosaurus magniventris and Nodosaurus textilis" in order to ensure both families of euankylosaur are excluded from Parankylosauria. Parankylosauria was later supported by a reappraisal of the known material of Antarctopelta.

Some studies do not replicate the composition of Parankylosauria as proposed in 2021. A 2022 study by Thomas Raven and colleagues, which did not include Stegouros in its phylogenetic dataset, found the Gondwanan ankylosaurs in traditional unrelated positions. A later 2025 study by Susannah Maidment and colleagues, which added Stegorous and an additional anatomical character to Raven's dataset, failed to find a monophyletic Parankylosauria. While Stegouros was found to be an early diverging ankylosaur, Antarctopelta was found to be a polacanthid and Kunbarrasaurus either a nodosaurid or polacanthid. A 2026 study by Federico L. Agnolín and colleagues also added Stegouros to Raven's dataset alongside 24 anatomical characters, and replicated the result of the 2021 with a monophyletic Parankylosauria, despite not utilizing its dataset. A later 2026 study by Emily Cross and colleagues updated the tooth characters of the Raven matrix and also failed to recover Parankylosauria. As the Agnolín study was released when the project was already far advanced, its additional characters could not be included, though they noted a tooth character added by Agnolín was subject to homoplasy (convergence) and thus uninformative. Stegouros and Antarctopelta were however found to be related in two of their analyses, and they noted testing more characteristics of the tail weaponry in future studies could improve results.

One of the analyses from the Agnolín 2026 study, which put less weight on homoplastic traits, found Parankylosauria to be an early-diverging lineage outside of Eurypoda, the grouping of Ankylosauria and Stegosauria. This position was supported by several plesiomorphic traits shared with more primitive ornithischians and early thyreophorans but absent in eurypodans. They noted that this was only found in one analysis, however, and concluded neither possible position of Parankylosauria was robustly supported above other possibilities. The following cladograms depict a position within Ankylosauria, taken from Soto-Acuña and colleagues' 2021 study, and an alternative position outside of Eurypoda, taken from Agnolín and colleagues' 2026 study:

Soto-Acuña et al. (2021)

- Thyreophora
  - Lesothosaurus
  - - Scutellosaurus
    - - Emausaurus
      - - Scelidosaurus
        - Eurypoda
          - Stegosauria
          - Ankylosauria
            - Parankylosauria
              - Kunbarrasaurus
              - - Antarctopelta
                - Stegouros
            - Euankylosauria
              - Nodosauridae
              - Ankylosauridae

Agnolín et al. (2026)

- Thyreophora
  - Scutellosaurus
  - - Emausaurus
    - - Scelidosaurus
      - - Eurypoda
          - Stegosauria
          - Ankylosauria
        - Parankylosauria
          - Yuxisaurus
          - - Stegouros
            - - Antarctopelta
              - Kunbarrasaurus
              - Minmi
              - Patagopelta

Some additional genera have a possible relationship to Parankylosauria. Patagopelta, from Argentina, was originally named as a Gondwanan nodosaur but later reclassified as a parankylosaur. Fonseca and colleagues found the unusual thyreophoran Jakapil to be earlier diverging than parankylosaurs, inline with its original description study, but noted that enforcing a relationship to Parankylosauria only resulted in a slightly less parsimonious tree. Therefore, they concluded a relationship with Parankylosauria could not be disregarded. Agnolín and colleagues found Minmi, excluded from prior phylogenetic studies, to be a parankylosaur. In one of their phylogenetic analyses, the Early Jurassic Chinese thyreophoran Yuxisaurus was found to be an early diverging parankylosaur. This would make it the earliest parankylosaur and the first from the Northern Hemisphere, but they noted that the result was only weakly supported and not found in any of their other analyses. Spicomellus, desite being from Gondwana, is dissimilar from parankylosaurs and has instead been found as an ankylosaurid.
