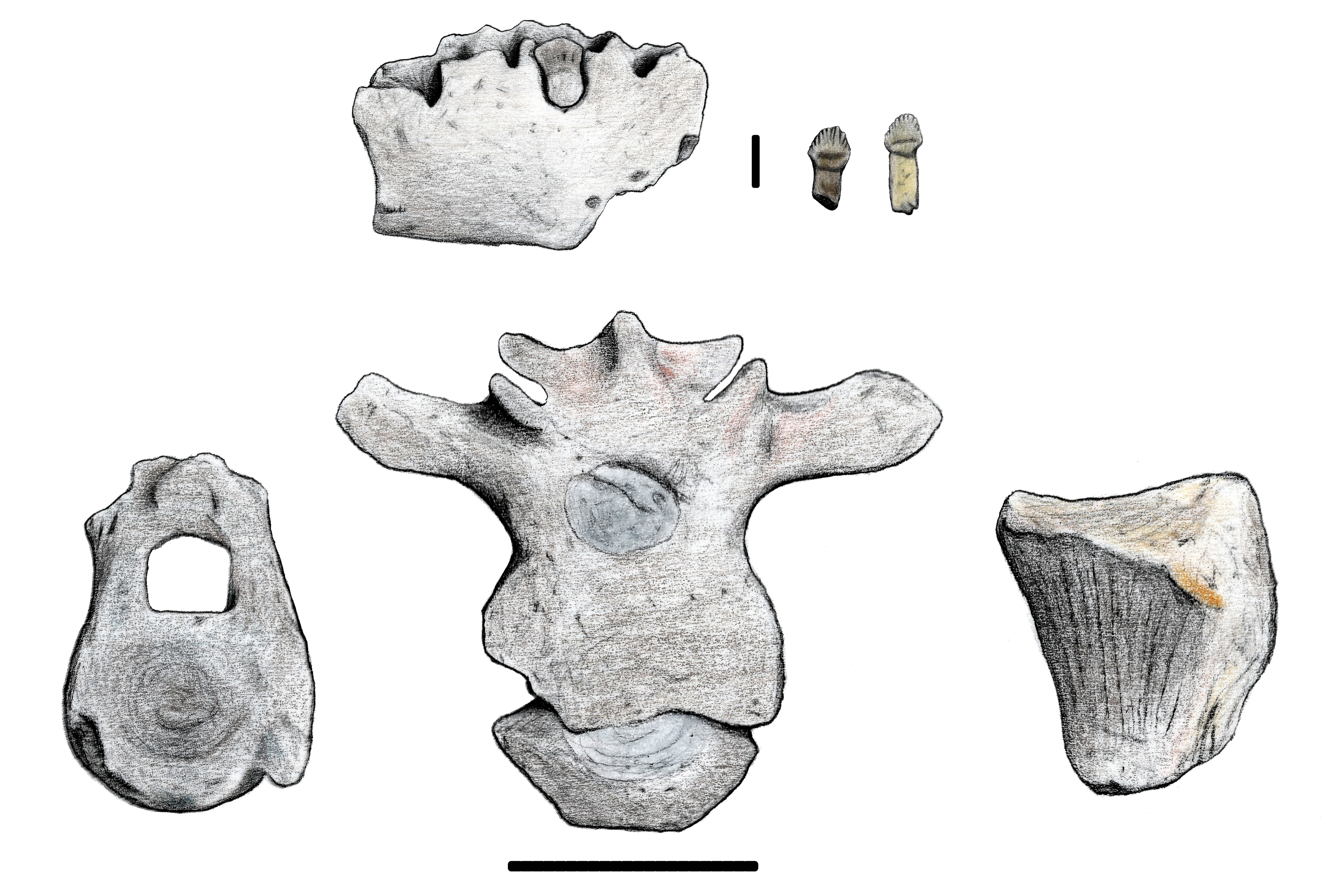
- Sketch of some of the holotype material

Scientific classification
- Kingdom: Animalia
- Phylum: Chordata
- Class: Reptilia
- Clade: Dinosauria
- Clade: †Ornithischia
- Clade: †Thyreophora
- Clade: †Ankylosauria (?)
- Clade: †Parankylosauria
- Genus: †Antarctopelta; Salgado & Gasparini, 2006

Type species
- †Antarctopelta oliveroi Salgado & Gasparini, 2006

= Antarctopelta =

Antarctopelta Temporal range: Late Cretaceous (Campanian), ~73.4 Ma

Extinct genus of ankylosaurian dinosaurs

Antarctopelta (ann-TARK-toh-PEL-tə; meaning 'Antarctic shield') is a genus of ankylosaurian dinosaur, a group of large, quadrupedal herbivores, that lived during the late Campanian stage of the Late Cretaceous period on what is now James Ross Island, Antarctica. Antarctopelta is the only known ankylosaur from Antarctica and a member of Parankylosauria. The only described specimen was found in 1986 and was the first dinosaur fossil to be named from the continent, by Argentine geologists Eduardo Olivero and Robert Scasso. The fossils were later described in 2006 by paleontologists Leonardo Salgado and Zulma Gasparini, who named the type species A. oliveroi after Olivero.

Antarctopelta is a medium-sized ankylosaur, reaching 4 meters (13 feet) or more in length, and shows characteristics of two different families, making more precise classification difficult for many years. In 2021 a nearly complete skeleton of the similar Chilean genus Stegouros was described. This led to the recognition of Parankylosauria, containing Antarctopelta, Stegouros, and Kunbarrasaurus. The head is small, with proportionally large teeth compared to other ankylosaurs and spikes above the orbits. The neck and back vertebrae were short and circular in cross-section, whereas the tail vertebrae were elongated and flattened. Its tail likely terminated in an arrangement of spiked osteoderms known as a macuahuitl, which resembled an Aztec weapon of the same name. Osteoderms were present on other parts of the body and came in six different shapes, with some being large and flat while others were tall and keeled.

It was discovered in rocks of the Gamma Member of the Snow Hill Island Formation, which bears a variety of other fossils, many of them unique as they evolved in the isolation of Antarctica after the breakup of Gondwana. Antarctopelta coexisted with the ornithopod dinosaur Trinisaura in addition to a menagerie of mosasaurs, plesiosaurs, and sharks.

== Discovery and naming ==
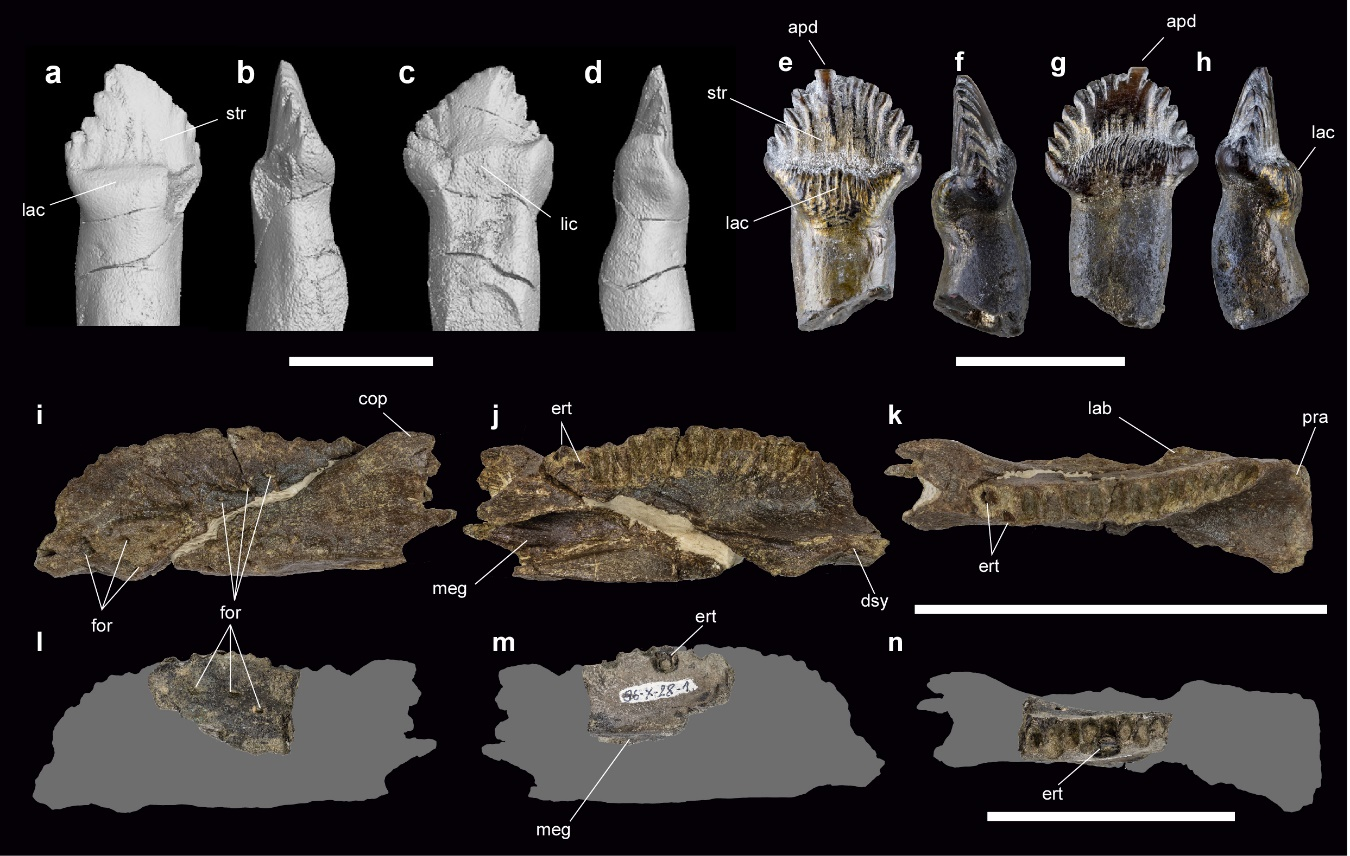
Comparison of the teeth (top right) and dentary (bottom row) of Antarctopelta with those of Stegouros

During an expedition to James Ross Island off the coast of Antarctica, an incomplete skeleton of an ankylosaur was discovered by Argentine geologists Eduardo Olivero and Robert Scasso in January 1986. However, excavations would not be finished for a decade due to ground frost and harsh weather conditions. Olivero and Scasso had found the specimen in strata from the Gamma Member of the Snow Hill Island Formation, which dates to the late Campanian age of the Late Cretaceous period, approximately at least 73.4 million years ago. The material all came from a single individual, but was spread over a 6 square meters (65 square feet) area and collected over several field seasons. The bones were heavily worn due to freeze-thaw weathering, causing many to become fragmented and broken. It was theorized that one of the phalanges came from a different individual, though this has been disproven. At this site, the specimen was unearthed with a tooth of the shark Notidanodon, likely due to scavenging, as well as bivalves. This implies that the ankylosaur died and floated out to sea, a phenomenon observed in other ankylosaurs.

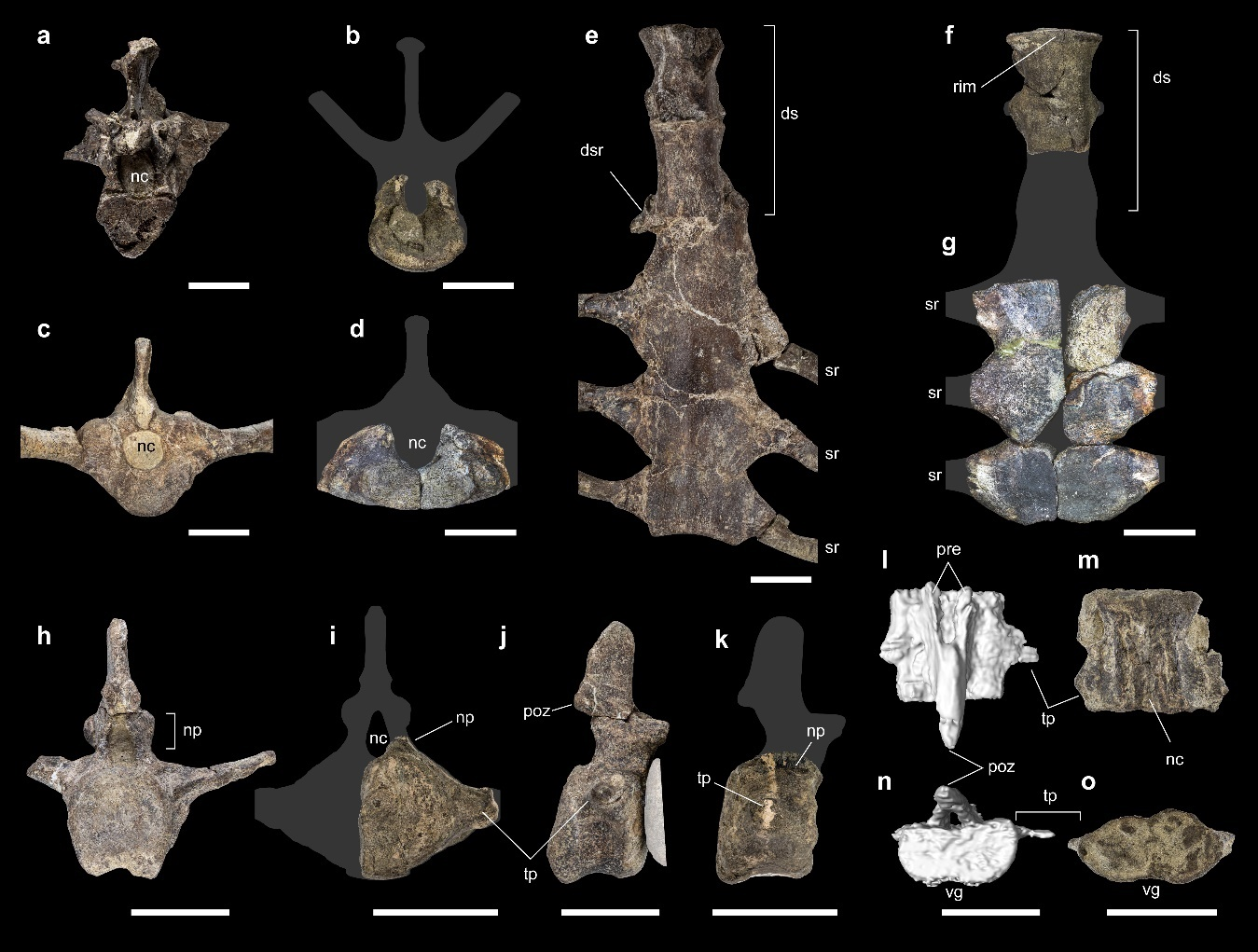
Comparison of vertebrae from Stegouros (left) and Antarctopelta (right)

The holotype (specimen used as the basis for the taxon) MLP 86-X-28-1 is the only known material of this genus and species, and was the first dinosaur fossil named and described from Antarctica. It consists of three isolated teeth, part of the lower jaw with another tooth in situ, some other skull fragments, vertebrae of the neck, back, hips and tail, some shoulder and hip bones (scapula, ilium) a thigh bone (femur), foot and hand bones (five metapodials and two phalanges), and numerous pieces of armor, representing approximately 15% of the skeleton.

Although the material had been known for decades and written about in three separate publications, Antarctopelta oliveroi was not named until 2006, by Argentine paleontologists Leonardo Salgado and Zulma Gasparini. It was therefore the second named genus of dinosaur from Antarctica after Cryolophosaurus in 1993, despite being discovered first. The genus name refers to its location on the continent of Antarctica and its armored nature. Antarctica is derived from the Greek words αντ/ant- ('opposite of') and αρκτος/arktos ('bear' referring to the constellation Ursa Major, which points north). The Greek πελτη/pelte ('shield') is commonly used to name genera of ankylosaurs (Cedarpelta and Sauropelta, for example). The single known species, A. oliveroi, is named after Eduardo Olivero, who discovered the holotype, first mentioned it in print, and has worked in Antarctica for decades.

== Description ==
Estimated size of Antarctopelta compared to a human

Like other ankylosaurs, Antarctopelta oliveroi was a stocky, herbivorous quadruped protected by armor plates embedded in the skin. Although a complete skeleton has not been found, the species is estimated to have reached a maximum length of 4 meters (13 feet) from snout to tail tip. In 2010 Gregory Paul gave a higher estimation of 6 meters (20 feet) and 350 kg (770 lb). The head was small, with jaws lined with small, leaf-shaped teeth. The limbs were short and about equal in length, the forefeet having five toes while the hindfeet had six.

Very little of the skull is known, but all of the preserved skull fragments were heavily ossified for protection. One bone in particular, identified as a supraorbital (brow ridge bone), bore a short spike which would have projected outwards over the eye. Other fossils likely from the quadratojugals (cheek bones), supraorbitals, and right parietal (cranium bone) were identified in 2006, though their poor condition gives little information. The leaf-shaped teeth are asymmetrical, with the majority of the denticles on the edge closest to the tip of the snout and large furrows on the cingula. Seven to eight mesial denticles are found on each Antarctopelta tooth, the highest number known from Parankylosauria, a trait distinguishing it from the related Stegouros. These teeth are also proportionately large compared to those of other ankylosaurs, with the largest measuring 10 millimetres (0.39 inches) across. This compares to the much larger North American Euoplocephalus, 6–7 m (20–23 ft) in body length, which had teeth averaging only 7.5 mm (0.30 in) across. A fragment from the left dentary (lower jaw bone) preserving these teeth was recovered, which has a curved tooth row like other ankylosaurs'.

=== Postcranium ===
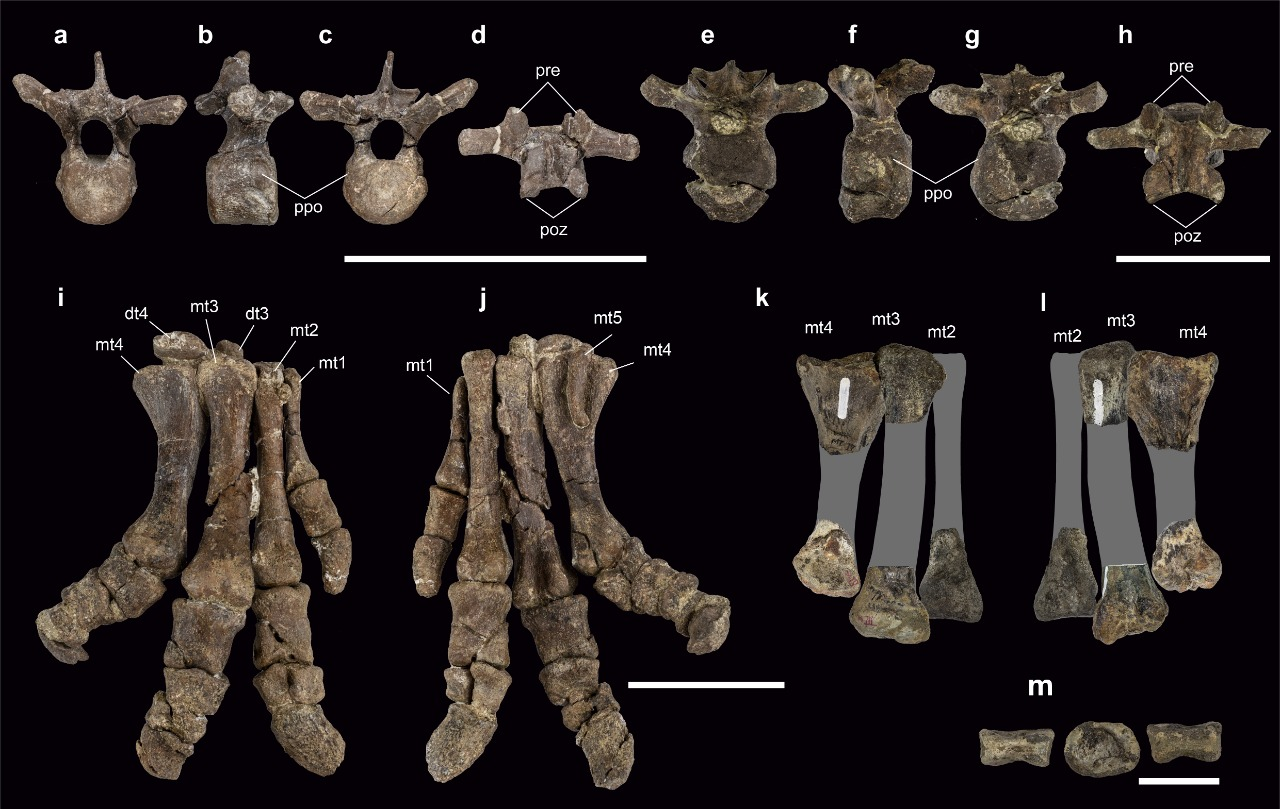
Cervical vertebrae and pedal bones of Stegouros (left) compared to those of Antarctopelta (right)

Five cervical vertebrae were found in the field, though three were molded by latex and the originally material was subsequently lost. Their centra are proportionally short with amphicoelus (biconcave) ends, bearing a centrum length to height ratio of only 0.57. This is in stark contrast to genera like Struthiosaurus and Ankylosaurus, which have ratios of 1.35 and 0.78 respectively. Neural canals, the area where the notochord would pass through, in these vertebrae are circular in cross-section and much larger than in Stegouros. Two dorsal vertebrae from the synsacrum were unearthed. Two complete and one incomplete sacral vertebrae, the last of which contains parts of the sacrum, were collected as well. These vertebrae are firmly ankylosed (fused) with each other and the sacrum. Elements of the ribs were found attached to the sacrals as well as eight fragments from midsections of ribs. Eight caudal vertebrae are preserved from the middle and distal portions of the tail. The distal caudals are associated with ossified tendons on the upper and lower sides. In ankylosaurids, these tendons help to stiffen the end of the tail in support of a large, bony tail club.

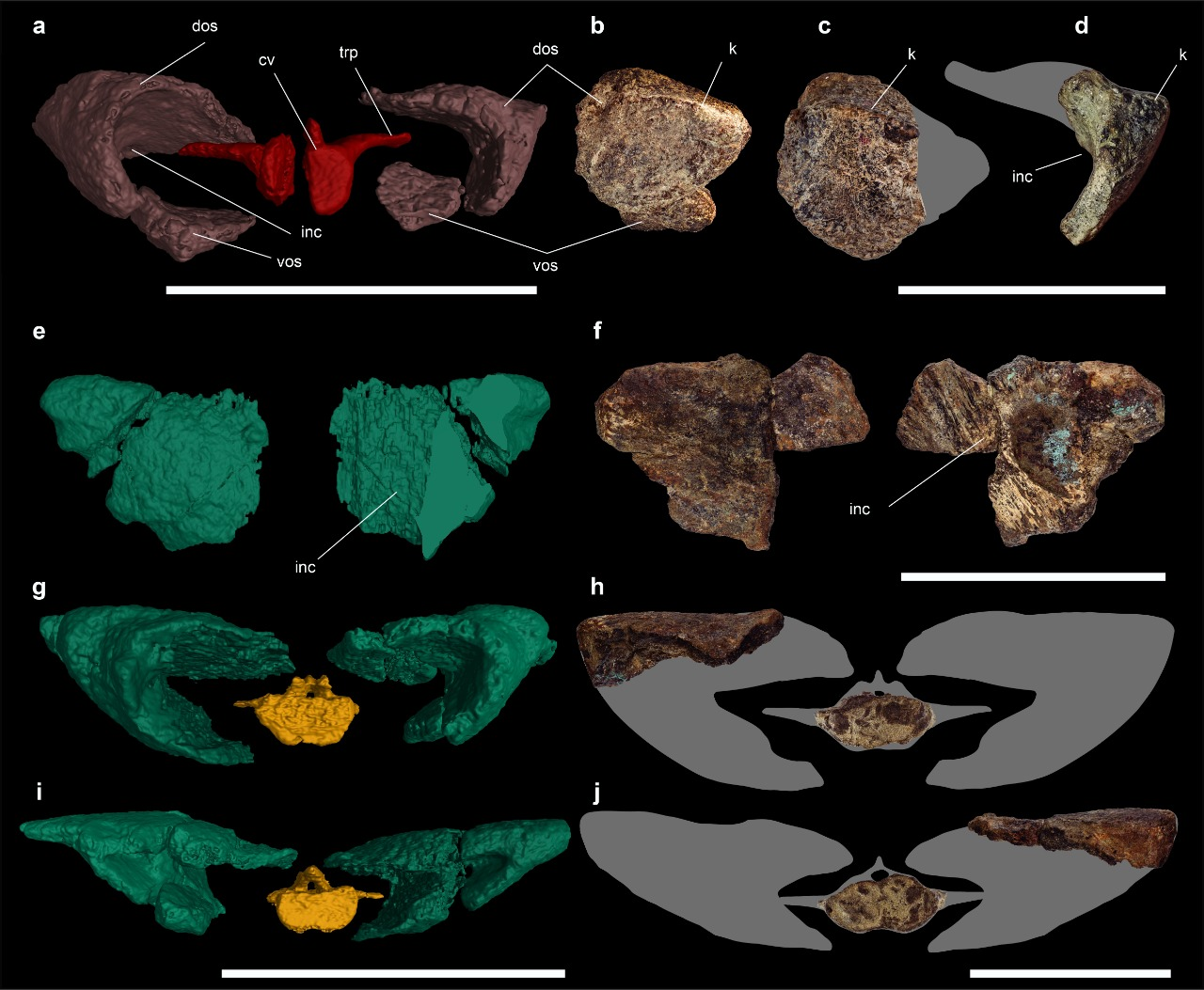
Tail osteoderms from Stegouros (left) and Antarctopelta (right) showing the anatomy of the macuahuitl

Antarctopelta and Stegouros have very similar caudal vertebrae, both having flattened distal centra with a prominent ventral groove. This implies that Antarctopelta also had a macuahuitl, a flat, spiked arrangement of osteoderms on the end of the tail. The name is in reference to the Aztec weapon due to its similar appearance and function. The appendicular skeleton is poorly known, but fragments were collected. The distal end of the left femur (thigh bone) was found. An estimate of the femur's total length was made, with an approximation of 30 centimetres (12 in) long. Five metapodials and two phalanges from the manus and possibly pes were also found. Ankylosaurs like Antarctopelta and Stegouros had four digits with four metapodials on the manus and pes. Some of the metapodials may be metatarsals, which are slender like those of Stegouros. Fragments from the scapula (shoulderblade) and ilium were unearthed, though the former bone is notably unfused with the coracoid. This suggests that the individual was immature, though histological analysis contradicts this.

Six different types of osteoderms were found along with the skeletal remains of Antarctopelta, but very few were articulated with the skeleton, so their placement on the body is largely speculative. They included the base of what would have been a large spike. Flat oblong plates resembled the ones that guarded the neck of the nodosaurid Edmontonia rugosidens. Large circular plates were found associated with smaller, polygonal nodules, perhaps forming a shield over the hips as seen in Sauropelta. Another type of osteoderm was oval-shaped with a keel running down the middle. A few examples of this fifth type were found ossified to the ribs, suggesting that they ran in rows along the flanks of the animal, a very typical pattern among ankylosaurs. The final group consisted mainly of small bony nodules which are often called ossicles, and were probably scattered throughout the body. Several ribs were also found with these ossicles attached.

== Classification ==
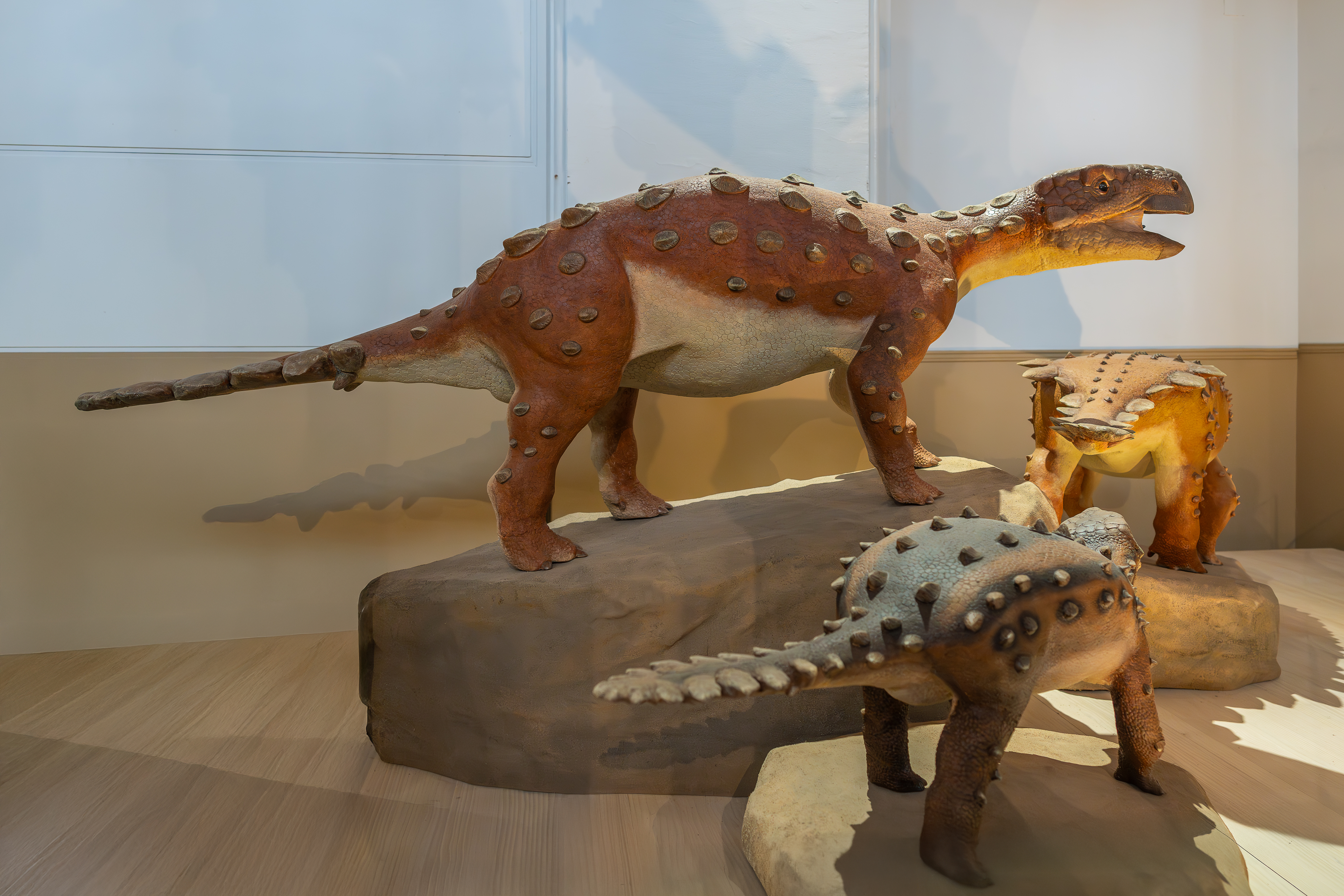
Lifelike models of Antarctopelta at the Chilean National Museum of Natural History

Ankylosaurs were a group of herbivorous, quadrupedal ornithischians with armored osteoderms adorning the dermis. Prior to the description of Stegouros, it was thought that there were two main families of ankylosaur; Nodosauridae, which has no tail club, and Ankylosauridae, with tail clubs. When first described, Antarctopelta was placed at an indeterminate level within Ankylosauria but was stated to have similarities with both nodosaurids and ankylosaurids. The dentiton and osteoderms share features with nodosaurids, while it was thought to have a clubbed tail like ankylosaurids. It had been designated as Ankylosauria incertae sedis before being subjected to a phylogenetic analysis. Later, in 2011 a phylogenetic analysis performed by Thompson and colleagues suggested that Antarctopelta was the basalmost known nodosaurid.

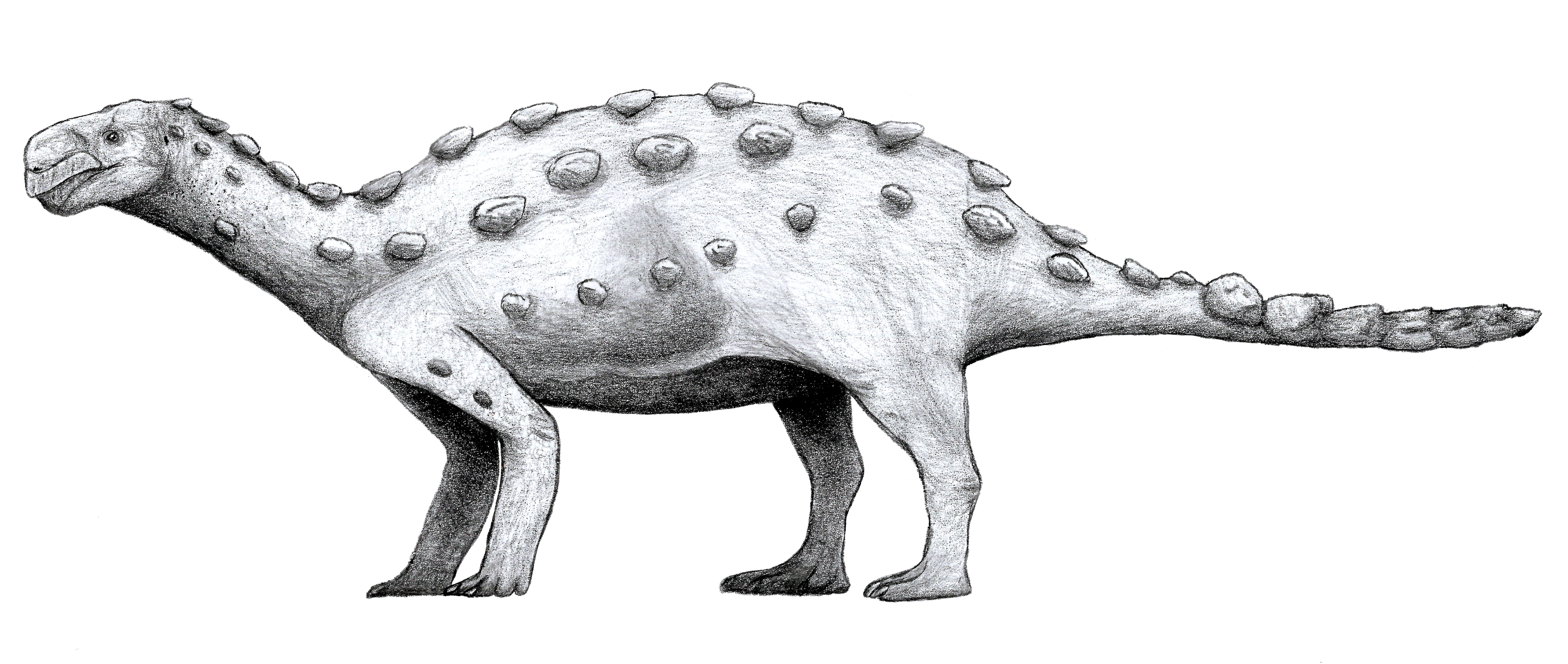
Speculative life restoration

In 2021, Sergio Soto-Acuña and colleagues described a new group of ankylosaurs, the Parankylosauria, with the description of Stegouros. This clade minimally comprises Kunbarrasaurus, Stegouros, and Antarctopelta, all of which are small ankylosaurs from the Southern Hemisphere, the latter of which is the largest. Soto Acuña, Vargas & Kaluza supported similar results in their 2024 redescription of Antarctopelta, also recovering Patagopelta as a parankylosaur. The following cladogram is reproduced from the phylogenetic analysis of Soto-Acuña et al. (2021):

- - Lesothosaurus
  - - Scutellosaurus
    - - Emausaurus
      - - Scelidosaurus
        - Eurypoda
          - Stegosauria
            - Huayangosaurus
            - Stegosauridae
          - Ankylosauria
            - Parankylosauria
              - Kunbarrasaurus
              - - Antarctopelta
                - Stegouros
            - Euankylosauria
              - Nodosauridae
              - - Liaoningosaurus
                - - Gobisaurus
                  - - Shamosaurus
                    - Ankylosaurinae

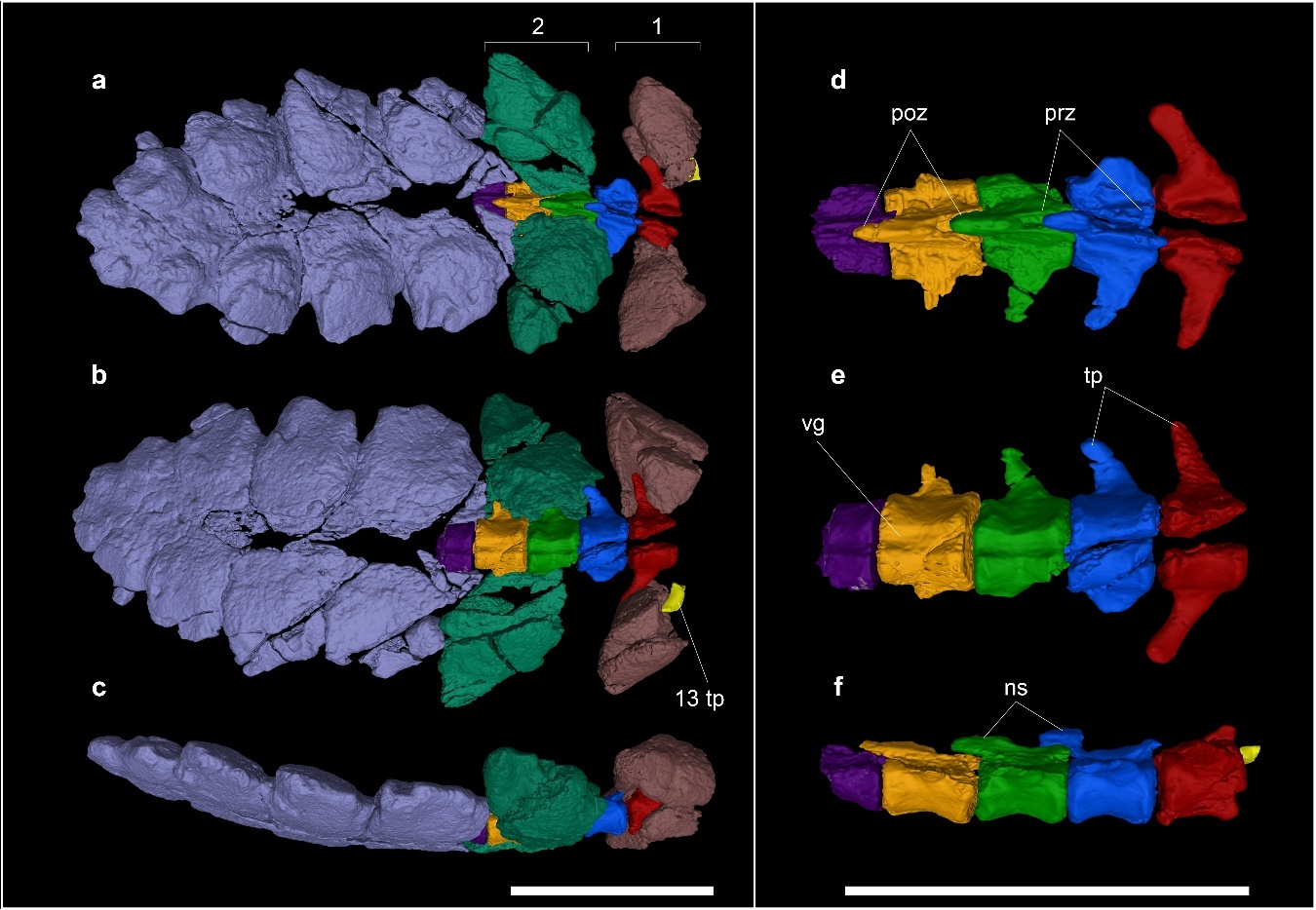
Tail weapon of Stegouros; Antarctopelta possesses a similar structure

== Paleobiology ==
Antarctopelta, based on phylogenetic bracketing and known material, probably had a macuahuitl like its relative Stegouros. This structure was made up of several fused, flat osteoderms that occupied the end of the tail. The osteoderms are spiked and point outwards in a frond-like pattern, suggesting a defensive function.

=== Histology ===
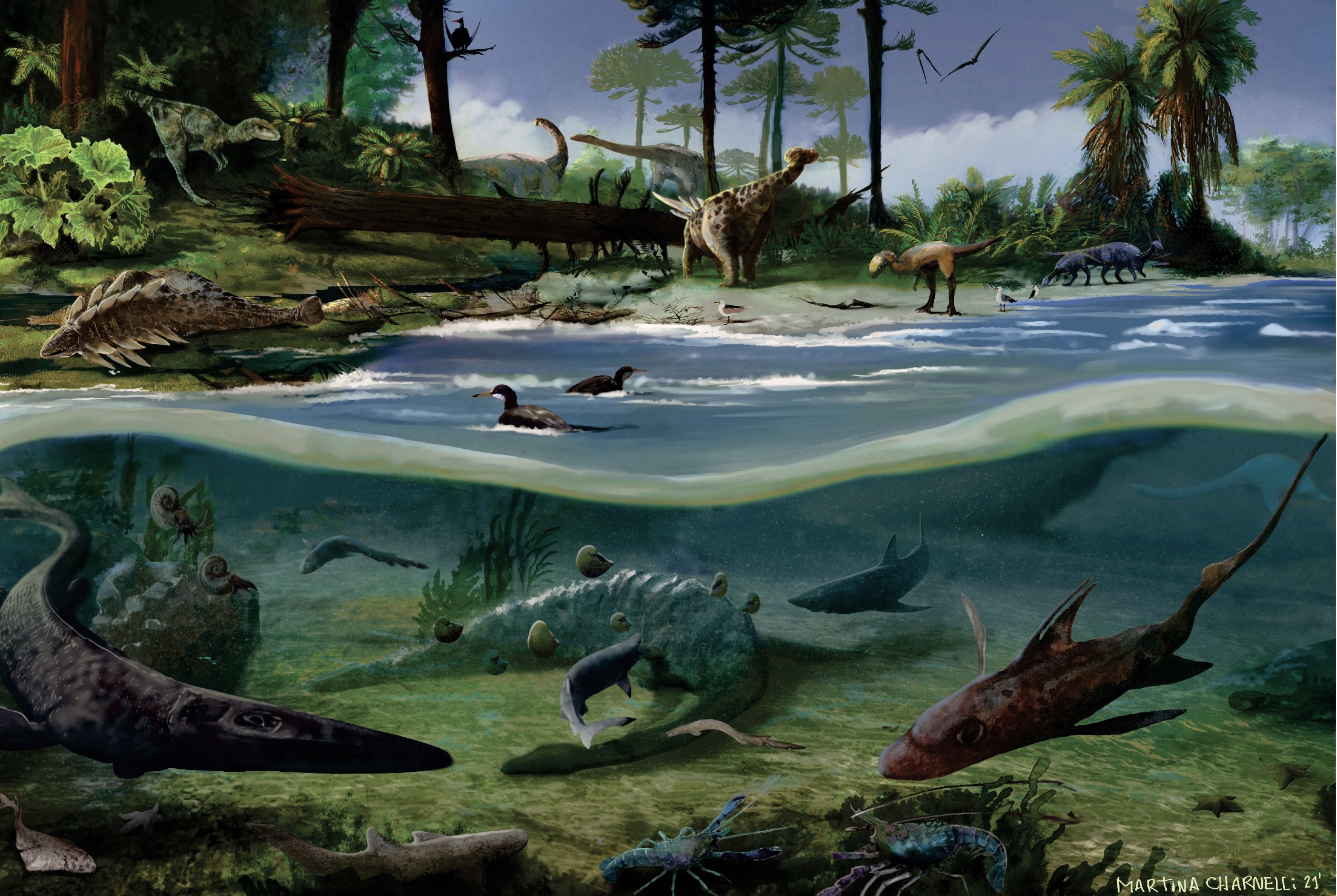
Reconstruction of the Snow Hill Island Formation's flora and fauna, with Antarctopelta on the left

Earlier work suggested that the holotype was a juvenile based on the fusion of bones. However, a 2019 histological analysis by Argentine paleontologist Ignacio Cerda and colleagues found that the holotype individual was sexually mature. Samples from three osteoderms, a bone shaft, a metapodial, several undetermined fragments, ossified tendons, and dorsal ribs were used in the study. Based on the spacing and organization of the Outer Circumferential Layer of the bone cortex, Cerda et al. concluded that the specimen had reached sexual maturity and was close to adult maturity. During their study, the authors found that one section of bone had an abnormal bone tissue that may have been caused by a tumor or other periosteal reaction. The growth patterns of the bones were not very dissimilar to those of ankylosaurs from lower latitudes. This suggests that the growth rates remained the same, despite different climatic or environmental conditions. This contrasts with hadrosaurs and ceratopsians, which have varying growth rates depending on the latitude.

== Paleoecology ==
The holotype skeleton was collected about 90 m (300 ft) from the base of the Gamma Member of the Snow Hill Island Formation. It is one of only two major dinosaur-bearing rock formations found on Antarctica, bearing all but two of the continent's named dinosaurs. The floral composition, habitat and climate are similar to modern volcanic arches. During the time in which Antarctopelta lived, Earth's climate was much warmer and more humid than it is today and as a result Antarctica was without ice. The environment was mainly dominated by large dense conifer forests, cycads, and ginkgos. The animals inhabiting Antarctica at this time would still have had to endure long periods of darkness during the winter, much like in modern-day Antarctica. Despite being found in marine sediment, Antarctopelta, like all ankylosaurs, lived on land. Other ankylosaurs have also been found in marine sediments, likely as a result of carcasses washing out to sea. The Antarctic Peninsula, including James Ross Island, was connected to South America throughout this time period, allowing interchange of fauna between both continents. In fact, the recent discovery of the Chilean parankylosaurian Stegouros shows that these dinosaurs inhabited also South America.

In the Gamma Member, wood fragments, twigs, and leaves have been found in concretions, some being associated with dinosaur fossils like Antarctopelta itself, and were apparently transported by the same ocean currents that brought the dinosaur carcasses. From the Gamma Member, Asteraceae pollen grains were collected that are the oldest records of the family. Some of the environment may have been wet and similar to peat bogs, as evidenced by the presence of Sphagnaceae (peat mosses) and several other groups including the clubmoss Selaginella, the firmoss group Lycopodiaceae, and the clade Ericaceae. The Gamma Member of the formation has yielded several other vertebrate remains, such as the ornithopod Trinisaura, a vertebral centrum of a lithostrothian sauropod, an aquatic elasmosaurid, and the carnivorous tylosaurine mosasaurs Taniwhasaurus and Hainosaurus. As for fishes and chondrichthyes, the bony fish Enchodus and Apateodus, an indeterminate ichthyodectiformes, and several sharks such as Sphenodus, Cretalamna, and Notidanodon have been collected. Ammonites, a kind of aquatic, shelled cephalopod, are also found in the layers of the Gamma Member.

== See also ==
- Timeline of ankylosaur research
- South Polar dinosaurs
