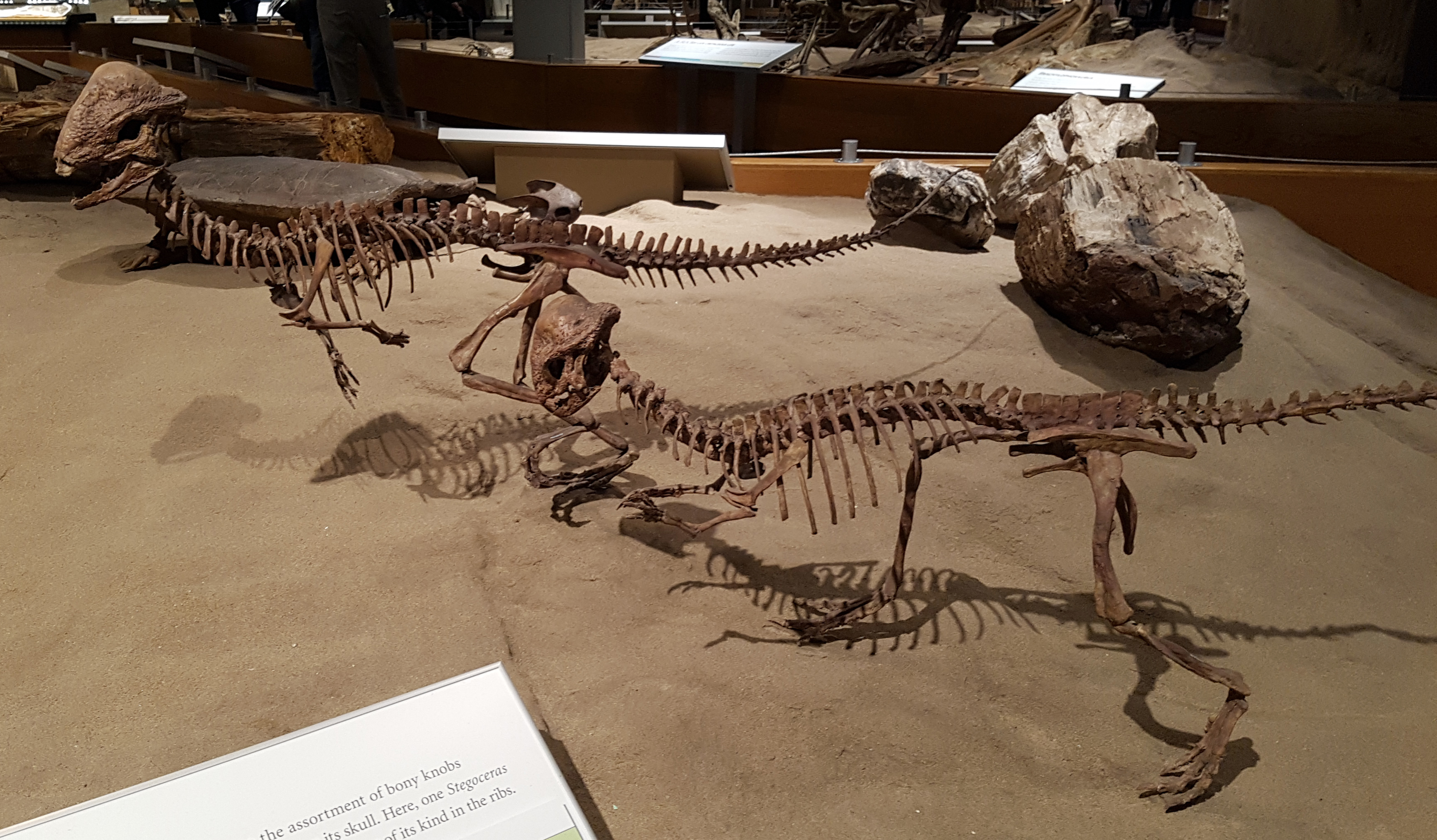
- Two reconstructed S. validum skeletons based on specimen UALVP 2, Royal Tyrrell Museum

Scientific classification
- Kingdom: Animalia
- Phylum: Chordata
- Class: Reptilia
- Clade: Dinosauria
- Clade: †Ornithischia
- Clade: †Pachycephalosauria
- Family: †Pachycephalosauridae
- Genus: †Stegoceras; Lambe, 1902

Type species
- †Stegoceras validum Lambe, 1902

Species
- †S. validum Lambe, 1902; †S. novomexicanum? Jasinski & Sullivan, 2011

Synonyms
- List: Stegoceras validus Lambe, 1902; Troodon validus Gilmore, 1924; Stegoceras browni Wall & Galton, 1979; Ornatotholus browni Galton & Sues, 1983; Gravitholus albertae Wall & Galton, 1979; Troodon sternbergi Brown & Schlaikjer, 1943; Stegoceras sternbergi (Brown & Schlaikjer, 1943); Hanssuesia sternbergi Brown & Schlaikjer, 1943; Texacephale langstoni? Longrich et al., 2010

= Stegoceras =

Stegoceras Temporal range: Late Cretaceous, ~77.5–74 Ma

Genus of pachycephalosaurid dinosaurs

Stegoceras is a genus of pachycephalosaurid (dome-headed) dinosaur that lived in what is now North America during the Late Cretaceous period, about 77.5 to 74 million years ago (mya). The first specimens from Alberta, Canada, were described in 1902, and the type species Stegoceras validum was based on these remains. The generic name means "horn roof", and the specific name means "strong". Several other species have been assigned to the genus, but these have since been moved to other genera or deemed junior synonyms. The remaining assigned species, S. novomexicanum, named in 2011 from fossils found in New Mexico, has also been debated, and may not belong to Stegoceras.

Stegoceras was a small, bipedal dinosaur about 2 to 2.5 metres (6.6 to 8.2 ft) long, and weighed around 10 to 40 kilograms (22 to 88 lb). The skull was roughly triangular with a short snout, and had a thick, broad, and relatively smooth dome on the top. The back of the skull had a thick "shelf" over the occiput, and it had a thick ridge over the eyes. Much of the skull was ornamented by tubercles (or round "outgrowths") and nodes (or "knobs"), many in rows, and the largest formed small horns on the shelf. The teeth were small and serrated. The skull is thought to have been flat in juvenile animals and to have grown into a dome with age. It had a rigid vertebral column, and a stiffened tail. The pelvic region was broad, perhaps due to an extended gut.

Originally known only from skull domes, Stegoceras was one of the first known pachycephalosaurs, and the incompleteness of these initial remains led to many theories about the affinities of this group. A complete Stegoceras skull with associated parts of the skeleton was described in 1924, which shed more light on these animals. Pachycephalosaurs are today grouped with the horned ceratopsians in the group Marginocephalia. Stegoceras itself has been considered basal (or "primitive") compared to other pachycephalosaurs. Stegoceras was most likely herbivorous, and it probably had a good sense of smell. The function of the dome has been debated, and competing theories include use in intra-specific combat (head or flank-butting), sexual display, or species recognition. S. validum is known from the Dinosaur Park Formation and the Oldman Formation, whereas S. novomexicanum is known from the Fruitland and Kirtland Formation.

== History of discovery ==
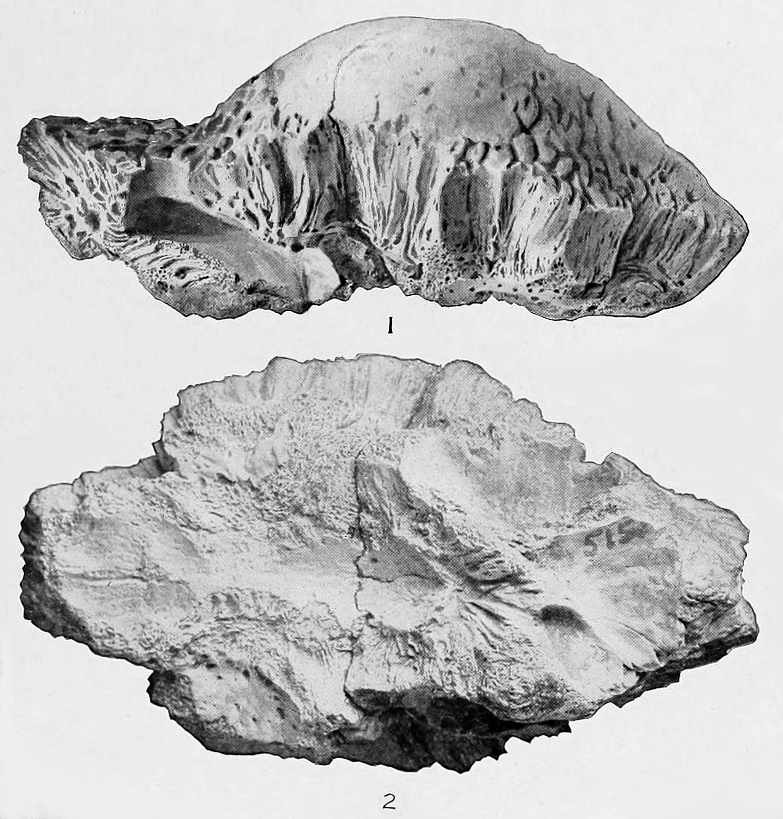
Partial dome CMN 515, lectotype of S. validum, shown from the right and underside

The first known remains of Stegoceras were collected by palaeontologist Lawrence Lambe from the Belly River Group, in the Red Deer River district of Alberta, Canada. These remains consisted of two partial skull domes (specimens CMN 515 and CMN 1423 in the Canadian Museum of Nature) from two animals of different sizes collected in 1898, and a third partial dome (CMN 1594) collected in 1901. Based on these specimens, Lambe described and named the new monotypic genus and species Stegoceras validus in 1902. The generic name Stegoceras comes from the Greek stegè/στέγη, meaning "roof" and keras/κέρας meaning "horn". The specific name validus means "strong" in Latin, possibly in reference to the thick skull-roof. Because the species was based on multiple specimens (a syntype series), CMN 515 was designated as the lectotype specimen by palaeontologist John Bell Hatcher in 1907.

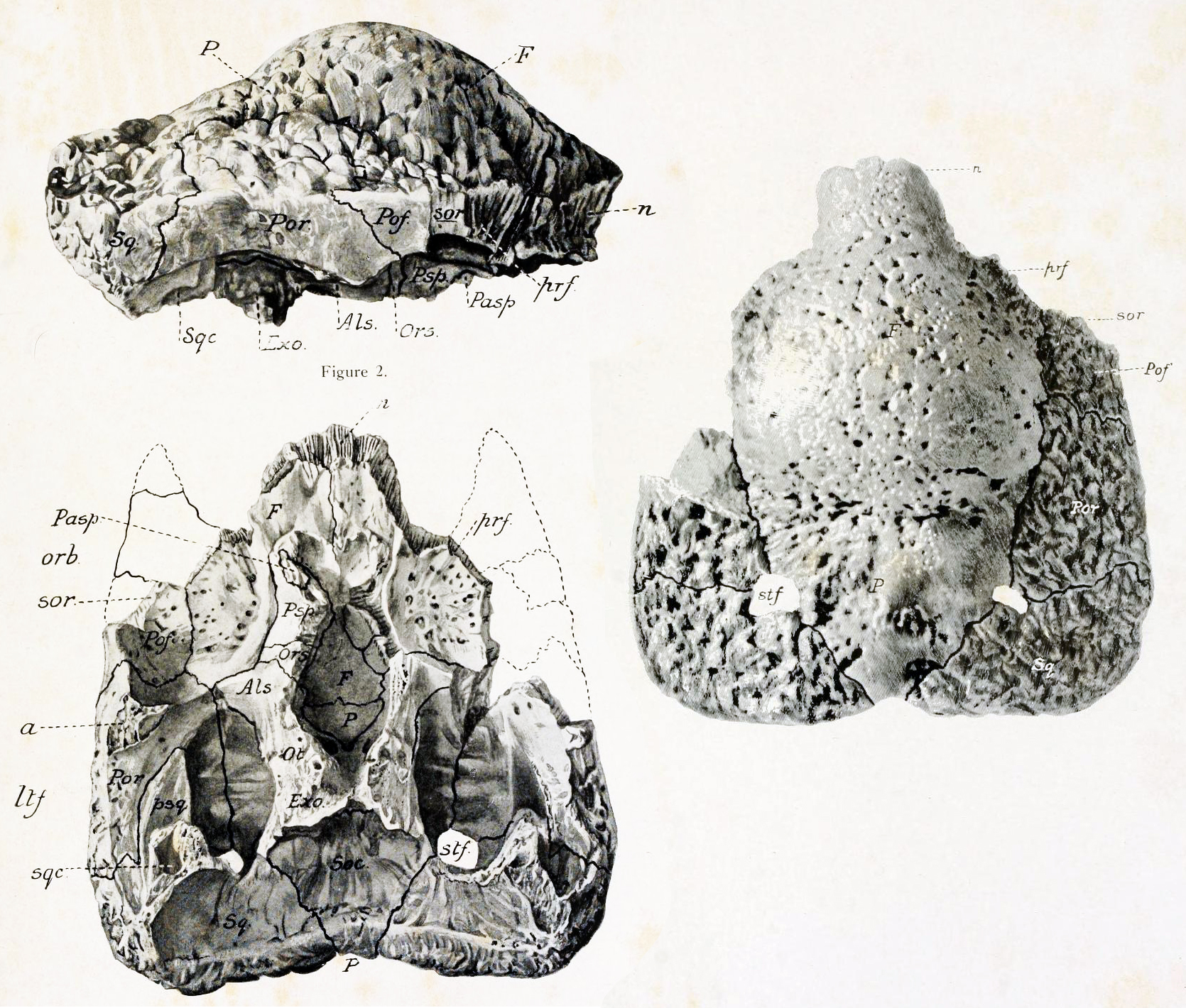
S. validum dome CMN 138

As no similar remains had been found in the area before, Lambe was unsure of what kind of dinosaur they were, and whether they represented one species or more; he suggested the domes were "prenasals" situated before the nasal bones on the midline of the head, and noted their similarity to the nasal horn-core of a Triceratops specimen. In 1903, palaeontologist Franz Nopcsa von Felső-Szilvás suggested that the fragmentary domes of Stegoceras were in fact frontal and nasal bones, and that the animal would therefore have had a single, unpaired horn. Lambe was sympathetic to this idea of a new type of "unicorn dinosaur" in a 1903 review of Nopscsa's paper. At this time, there was still uncertainty over which group of dinosaur Stegoceras belonged to, with both ceratopsians (horned dinosaurs) and stegosaurs (plated dinosaurs) as contenders.

Hatcher doubted whether the Stegoceras specimens belonged to the same species and whether they were dinosaurs at all, and suggested the domes consisted of the frontal, occipital, and parietal bones of the skull. In 1918, Lambe assigned another dome (CMN 138) to S. validus, and named a new species, S. brevis, based on specimen CMN 1423 (which he originally included in S. validus). By this time, he considered these animals as members of Stegosauria (then composed of both families of armoured dinosaurs, Stegosauridae and Ankylosauridae), in a new family he called Psalisauridae (named for the vaulted or dome-shaped skull roof).

=== Confusion with Troodon ===
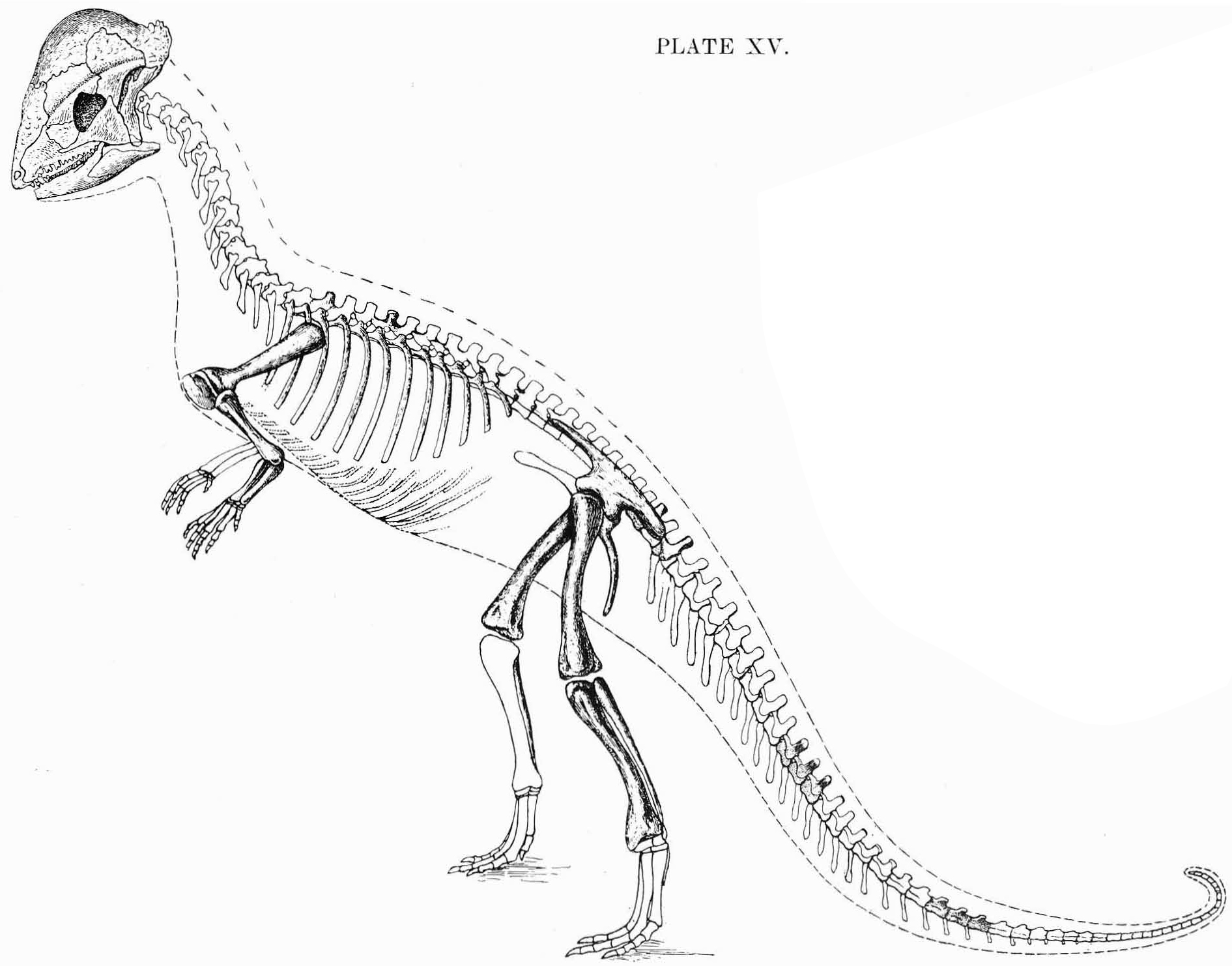
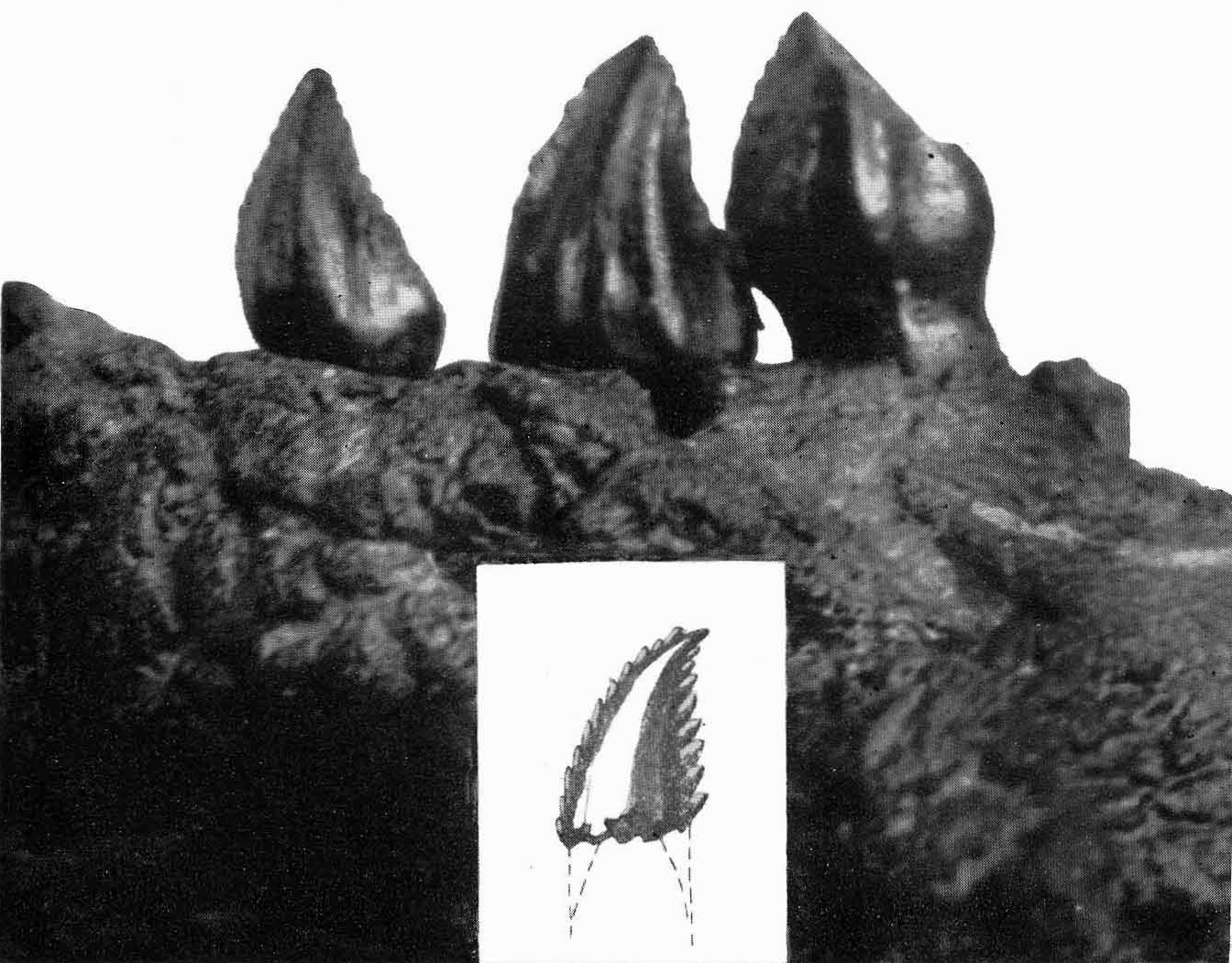
Gilmore's 1924 skeletal reconstruction of UALVP 2 (left), showing the ossified tendons of the tail as gastralia, and comparison between its teeth and that of Troodon (right), a genus which Gilmore argued was the senior synonym of Stegoceras

In 1924, palaeontologist Charles W. Gilmore described a complete skull of S. validus with associated postcranial remains, by then the most complete remains of a dome-headed dinosaur. It was discovered in the Belly River Group by the American palaeontologist George F. Sternberg in 1926, and catalogued as specimen UALVP 2 in the University of Alberta Laboratory for Vertebrate Palaeontology. This find confirmed Hatcher's interpretation of the domes as consisting of the frontoparietal area of the skull. UALVP 2 was found with small, disarticulated bony elements, then thought to be gastralia (abdominal ribs), which are not known in other ornithischian dinosaurs (one of the two main groups of dinosaurs). Gilmore pointed out that the teeth of S. validus were very similar to those of the species Troodon formosus (named in 1856 and by then only known from isolated teeth), and described a skull dome discovered close to the locality where Troodon was found. Therefore, Gilmore considered Stegoceras an invalid junior synonym of Troodon, thereby renaming S. validus into T. validus, and suggested that even the two species might be the same. Furthermore, he found S. brevis to be identical to S. validus, and therefore a junior synonym of the latter. He also placed these species in the new family Troodontidae (since Lambe had not selected a type genus for his Psalisauridae), which he considered closest to the ornithopod dinosaurs. Because the skull seemed so specialized compared to the rather "primitive"-looking skeleton, Nopcsa doubted whether these parts actually belonged together, and suggested the skull belonged to a nodosaur, the skeleton to an ornithopod, and the supposed gastralia (belly ribs) to a fish. This claim was rebutted by Gilmore and Loris S. Russell in the 1930s.

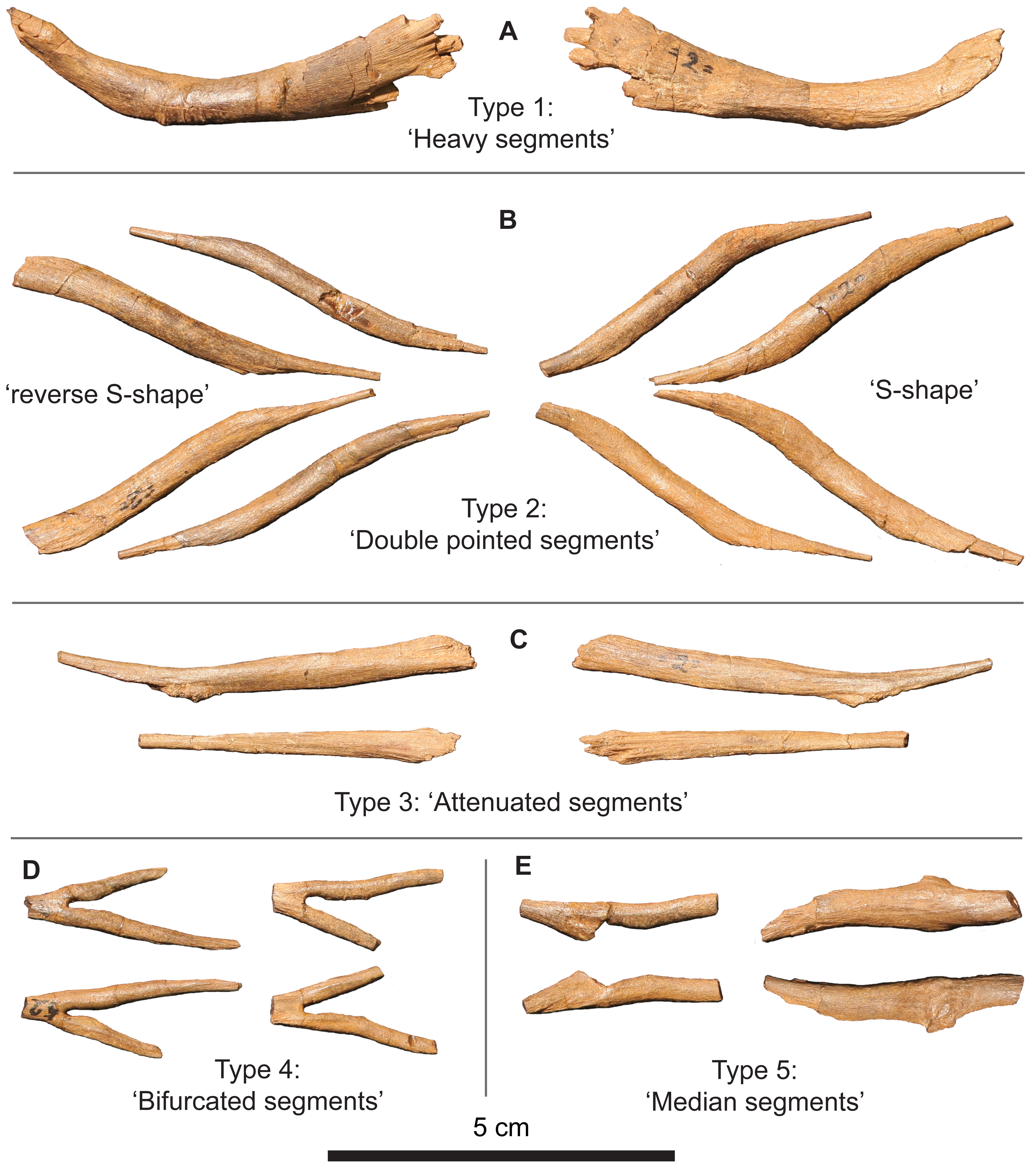
The ossified tendons of the tail of UALVP 2 are today recognised as myorhabdoi

Gilmore's classification was supported by palaeontologists Barnum Brown and Erich Maren Schlaikjer in their 1943 review of the dome-headed dinosaurs, by then known from 46 skulls. From these specimens, Brown and Schlaikjer named the new species T. sternbergi and T. edmontonensis (both from Alberta), as well as moving the large species T. wyomingensis (which was named in 1931) to the new genus Pachycephalosaurus, along with two other species. They found T. validus distinct from T. formosus, but considered S. brevis the female form of T. validus, and therefore a junior synonym. By this time, the dome-headed dinosaurs were either considered relatives of ornithopods or of ankylosaurs.

In 1945, after examining casts of T. formosus and S. validus teeth, palaeontologist Charles M. Sternberg demonstrated differences between the two, and instead suggested that Troodon was a theropod dinosaur, and that the dome-headed dinosaurs should be placed in their own family. Though Stegoceras was the first member of this family to be named, Sternberg named the group Pachycephalosauridae after the second genus, as he found that name (meaning "thick head lizard") more descriptive. He also considered T. sternbergi and T. edmontonensis members of Stegoceras, found S. brevis valid, and named a new species, S. lambei, based on a specimen formerly assigned to S. validus. The split from Troodon was supported by Russell in 1948, who described a theropod dentary with teeth almost identical to those of T. formosus.

=== Later taxonomic developments ===
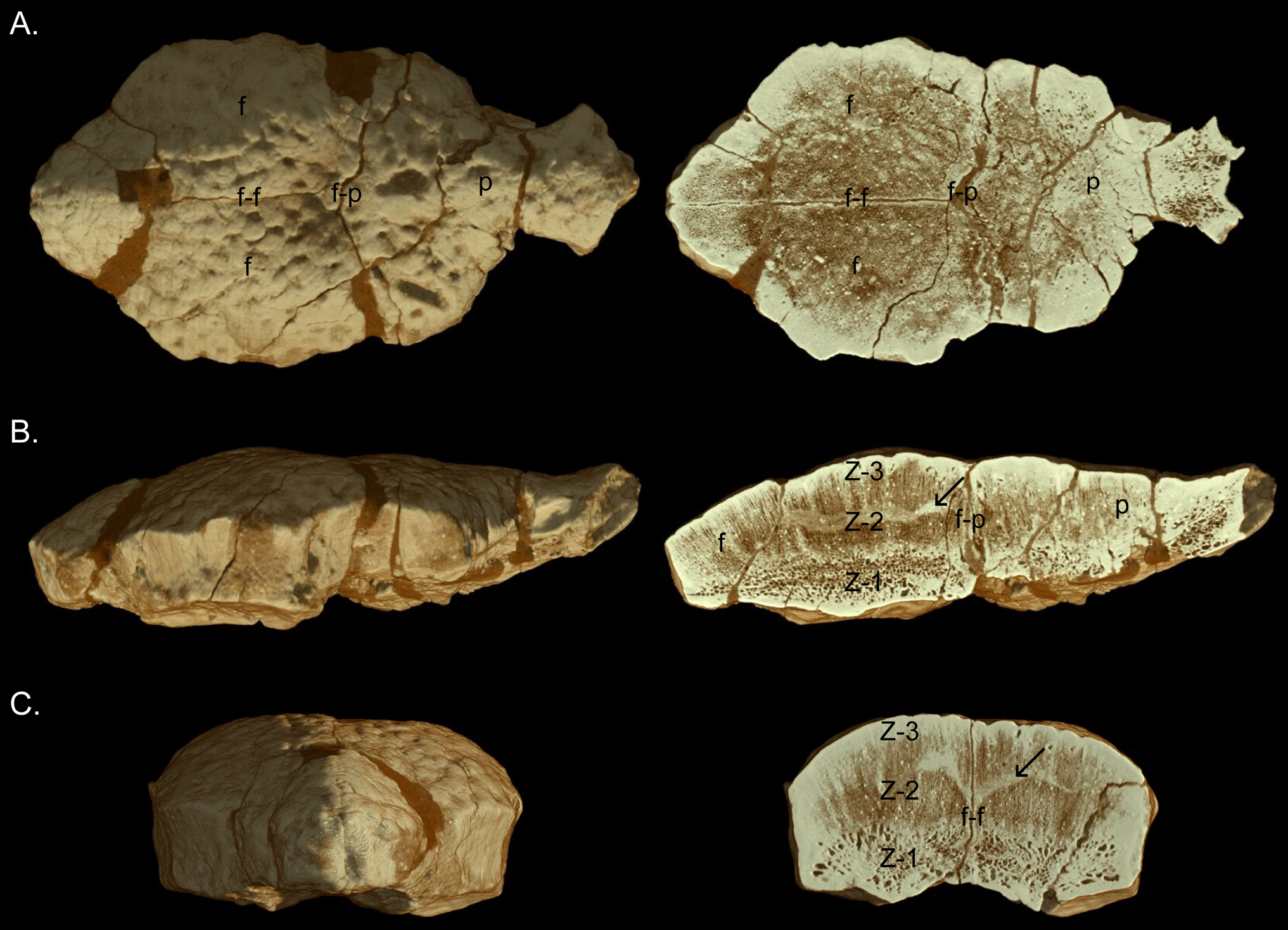
CT images of juvenile, flat-headed AMNH 5450 (formerly considered the distinct genus "Ornatotholus"), with sections on the right

In 1953, palaeontologist Birger Bohlin named Troodon bexelli based on a parietal bone from China. In 1964, palaeontologist Oskar Kuhn considered this as an unequivocal species of Stegoceras; S. bexelli. In 1974, palaeontologists Teresa Maryańska and Halszka Osmólska concluded that the "gastralia" of Stegoceras were ossified tendons, after identifying such structures in the tail of the pachycephalosaur Homalocephale. In 1979, palaeontologists William Patrick Wall and Peter Galton named the new species Stegoceras browni, based on a flattened dome, formerly described as a female S. validus by Galton in 1971. The specific name honours Brown, who found the holotype specimen (specimen AMNH 5450 in the American Museum of Natural History) in Alberta. This study also named the new genus and species Gravitholus albertae, based on specimen TMP 1972.027.0001 found in the Oldman Formation of Alberta. Its generic name means "heavy dome", and it was thought distinct from Stegoceras by features including its wide dome and small braincase. In 1983, Galton and Hans-Dieter Sues moved S. browni to its own genus, Ornatotholus (ornatus is Latin for "adorned" and tholus for "dome"), and considered it the first known American member of a group of "flat-headed" pachycephalosaurs, previously known from Asia. In a 1987 review of the pachycephalosaurs, Sues and Galton emended the specific name validus to validum, which has subsequently been used in the scientific literature. These authors synonymized S. brevis, S. sternbergi, and S. lambei with S. validum, found that S. bexelli differed from Stegoceras in several features, and considered it an indeterminate pachycephalosaur. In 1998, Goodwin and colleagues considered Ornatotholus a juvenile S. validum, therefore a junior synonym.

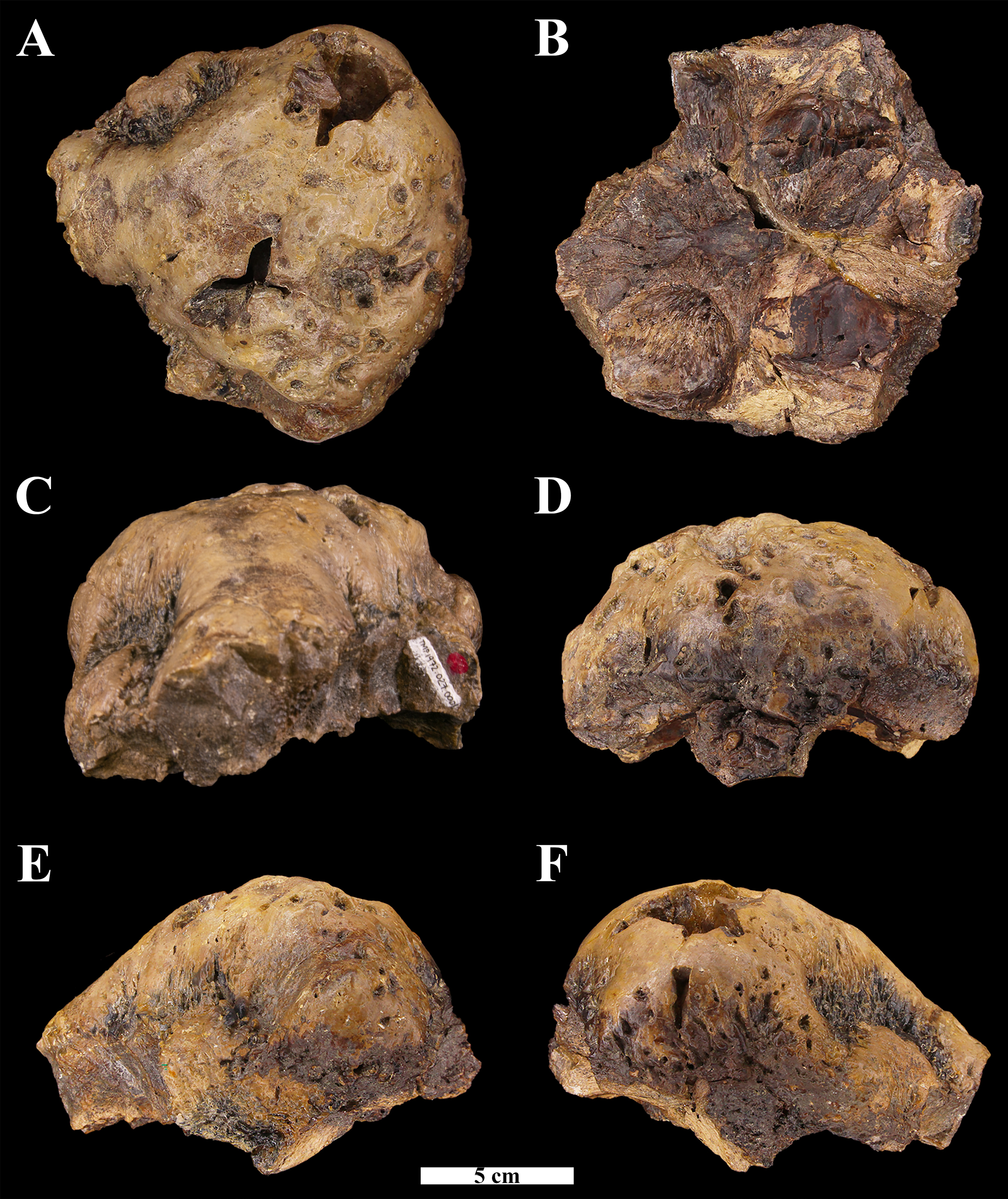
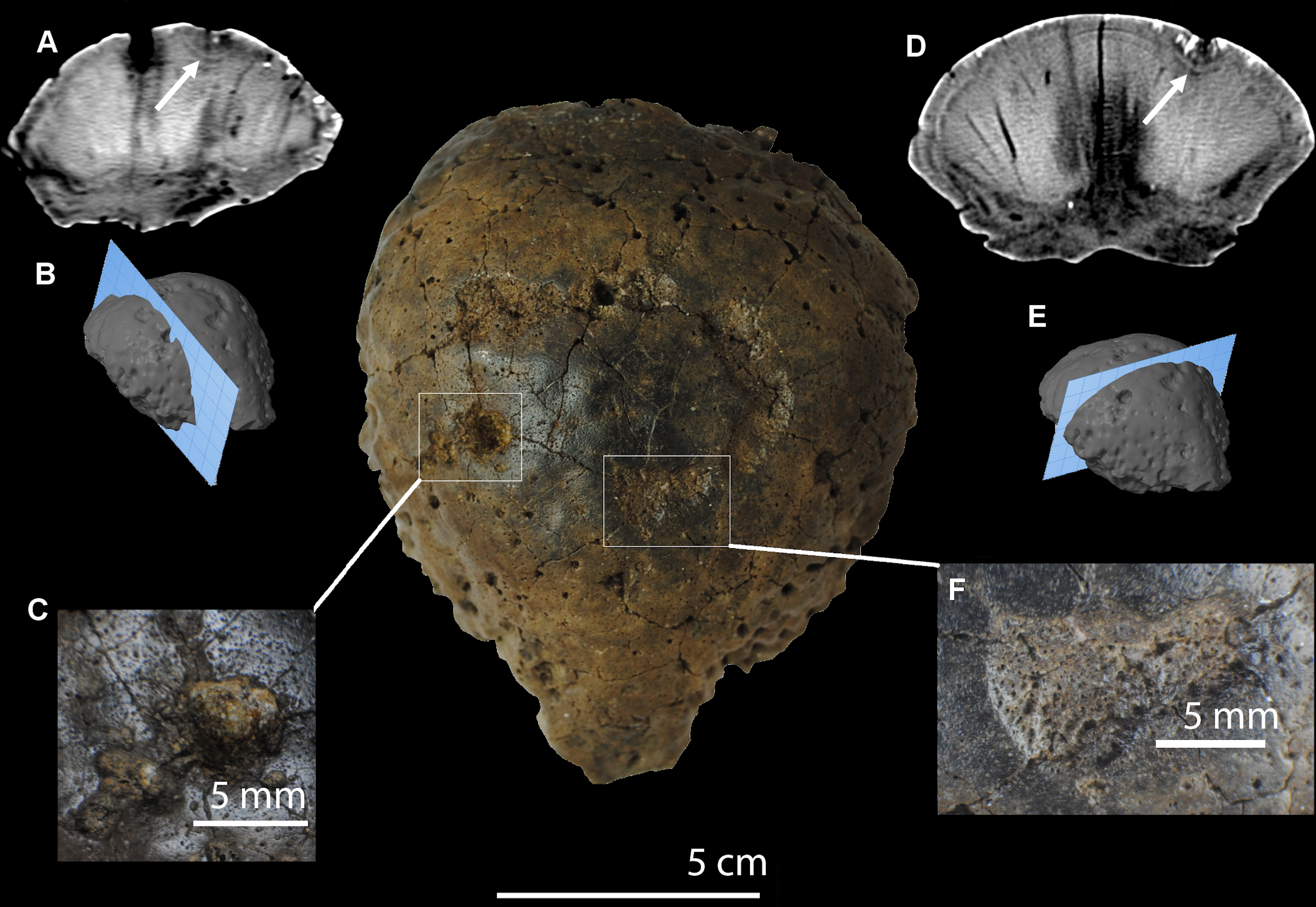
Holotype dome of Gravitholus (left) and specimen assigned to Hanssuesia (right), two taxa proposed to be synonyms of Stegoceras

In 2000, palaeontologist Robert M. Sullivan assigned S. edmontonensis and S. brevis to the genus Prenocephale (until then only known from the Mongolian species P. prenes), and found it more likely that S. bexelli belonged to Prenocephale than to Stegoceras, but considered it a nomen dubium (dubious name, without distinguishing characters) due to its incompleteness, and noted its holotype specimen appeared to be lost. In 2003, Thomas E. Williamson and Thomas Carr considered Ornatotholus a nomen dubium, or perhaps a juvenile Stegoceras. In a 2003 revision of Stegoceras, Sullivan agreed that Ornatotholus was a junior synonym of Stegoceras, moved S. lambei to the new genus Colepiocephale, and S. sternbergi to the new genus Hanssuesia, named after Sues. He stated that the genus Stegoceras had become a wastebasket taxon for small to medium-sized North American pachycephalosaurs until that point. By this time, dozens of specimens had been assigned to S. validum, including many domes too incomplete to be identified as Stegoceras with certainty. UALVP 2 is still the most complete specimen of Stegoceras, upon which most scientific understanding of the genus is based. S. brevis was moved to the new genus Foraminacephale in 2016 by Ryan K. Schott Schott and David C. Evans, and S. bexelli to Sinocephale in 2021 by Evans and colleagues.

In 2023, palaeontologist Aaron D. Dyer and colleagues analysed sutures and individual elements in the skulls of Gravitholus and Hanssuesia, the former based on synchrotron data, and found no significant distinction between them and Stegoceras validum. They considered both as junior synonyms, with Gravitholus representing the end-stage in the growth of Stegoceras. Supposed distinguishing traits of Hanssuesia were found to be based on misinterpretations.

=== Fossils from the southern US ===
In 2002, Williamson and Carr described a dome (specimen NMMNH P-33983 in the New Mexico Museum of Natural History and Science) from the San Juan Basin, New Mexico, which they considered a juvenile pachycephalosaur of uncertain species (though perhaps Sphaerotholus goodwini). In 2006, Sullivan and Spencer G. Lucas considered it a juvenile S. validum, which would expand the range of the species considerably. In 2011, palaeontologist Steven E. Jasinski and Sullivan considered the specimen an adult, and made it the holotype of the new species Stegoceras novomexicanum, with two other specimens (SMP VP-2555 and SMP VP-2790) as paratypes. A 2011 phylogenetic analysis by Watabe and colleagues did not place the two Stegoceras species close to each other.

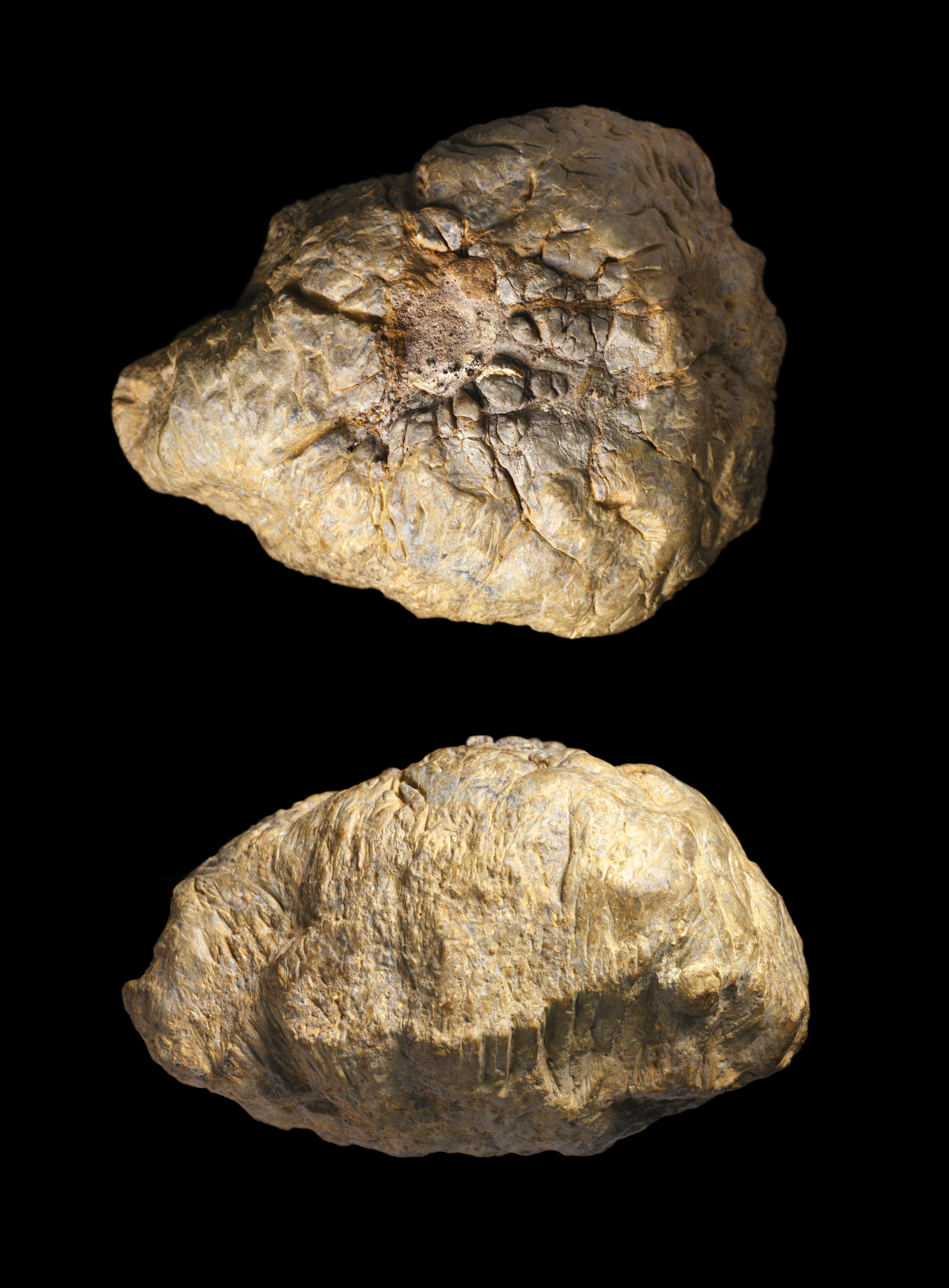
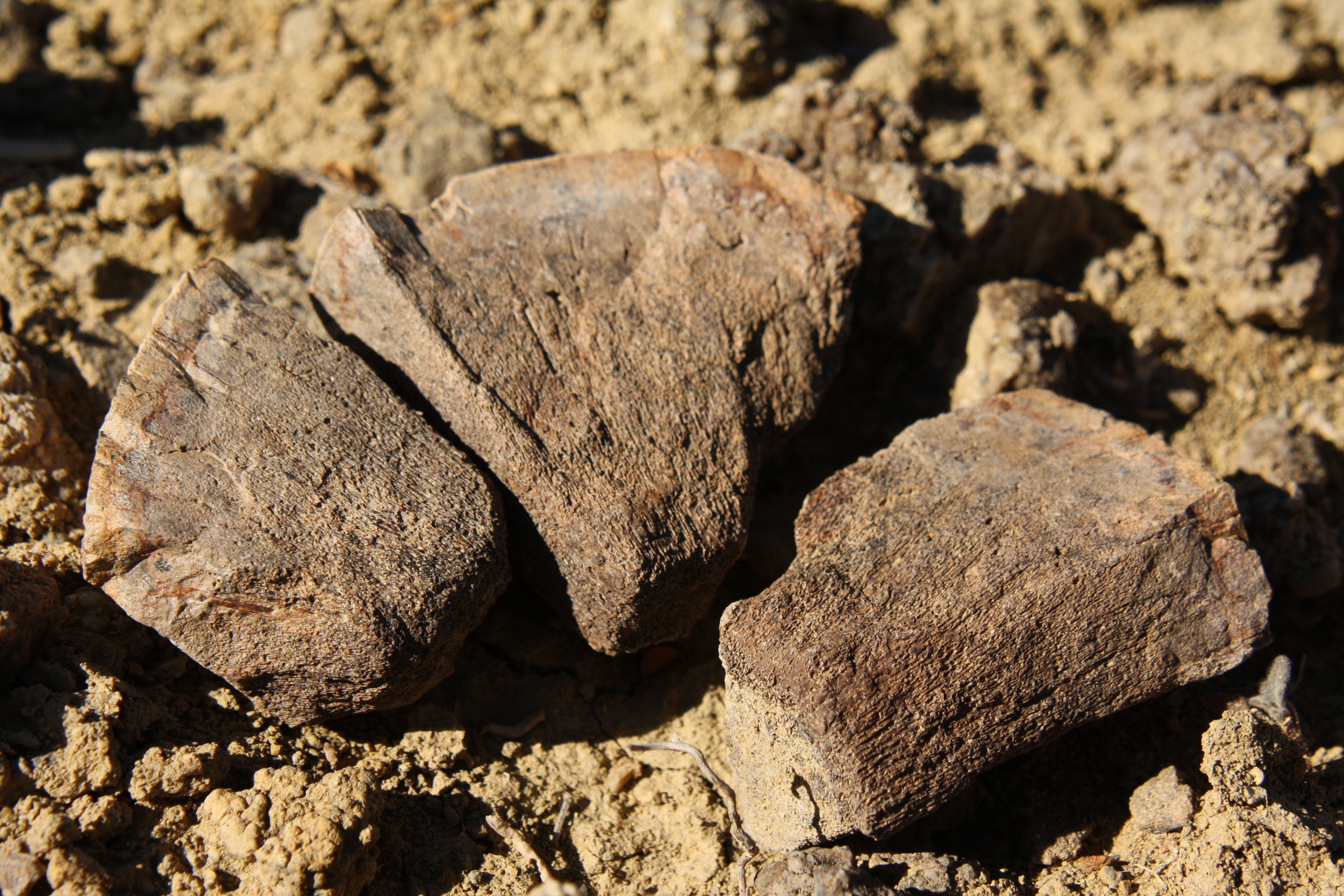
Holotype and assigned domes of Texacephale that may represent southern examples of Stegoceras

In 2016, palaeontologists Williamson and Stephen L. Brusatte restudied the holotype of S. novomexicanum and found that the paratypes did not belong to the same taxon as the holotype, and that all the involved specimens were juveniles. Furthermore, they were unable to determine whether the holotype specimen represented the distinct species S. novomexicanum, or if it was a juvenile of either S. validum or Sphaerotholus goodwini, or another previously known pachycephalosaur. In 2016, Jasinski and Sullivan defended the validity of S. novomexicanum; they agreed that some features used to diagnose the species were indicative of a sub-adult stage, but presented additional diagnostic features in the holotype that distinguish the species. They also pointed out some adult features, which may indicate heterochrony (difference in timing of ontogenetic changes between related taxa) in the species. They conceded that the paratypes and other assigned specimens differed from the holotype in having more highly domed skulls, instead assigning to them as cf. S. novomexicanum (difficult to identify), but found it likely they all belonged to the same taxon (with the assigned specimens being adults), due to the restricted stratigraphic interval and geographic range. Dyer and colleagues found that the S. novomexicanum holotype could be an immature Sphaerotholus goodwini, because the proposed unique traits of S. novomexicanum disappeared through ontogeny in S. validum.

In 2024, a specimen of Stegoceras from the Aguja Formation of Texas was described, and assigned to Stegoceras based on morphometric analyses by palaeontologists Steven L. Wick and Thomas M. Lehman. It was a juvenile, very comparable to juveniles of S. validum, but different in some aspects. They considered it a possible representative of a new southern species of Stegoceras, but not S. novomexicanum, since the study concluded it was very dissimilar from other Stegoceras specimens and therefore probably not referable to Stegoceras. The description also included the holotype of Texacephale langstoni in its morphometric analysis, where it was also found to be very similar to S. validum but not to the extent to which the authors of the study outright assigned it to that species. Nevertheless, the authors of the study considered that the holotype of Texacephale was probably an adult specimen of Stegoceras.

== Description ==
Size of S. validum compared to a human

Stegoceras is one of the most completely known North American pachycephalosaurs, and one of the few known from postcranial remains; S. validum specimen UALVP 2 is the most complete Stegoceras individual known to date. Its length is estimated to have been about 2 to 2.5 metres (6.6 to 8.2 ft), comparable to the size of a goat. The weight has been estimated to be about 10 to 40 kilograms (22 to 88 lb). Stegoceras was small to medium in size compared to other pachycephalosaurs. S. novomexicanum appears to have been smaller than S. validum, but it is disputed whether the known specimens (incomplete skulls) are adults or juveniles.

=== Skull and dentition ===
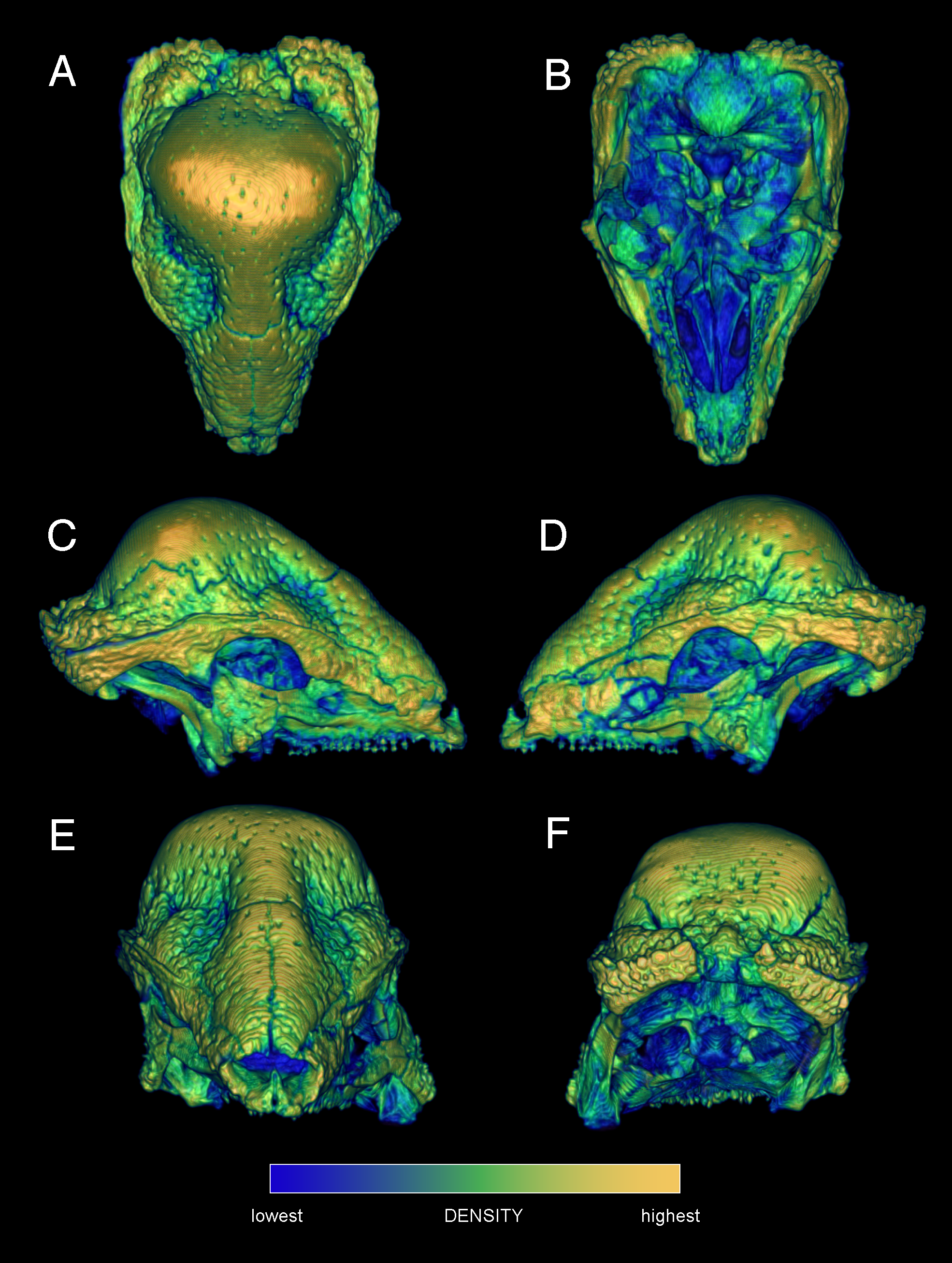
CT images of skull UALVP 2 in multiple views, showing relative surface densities of bone (blue: low, yellow: high)

The skull of Stegoceras was roughly triangular in shape when viewed from the side, with a relatively short snout. The frontal and parietal bones were very thick and formed an elevated dome. The suture between these two elements was obliterated (only faintly visible in some specimens), and they are collectively termed the "frontoparietal". The frontoparietal dome was broad and had a relatively smooth surface, with only the sides being rugose (wrinkled). It was narrowed above and between the orbita (eye sockets). The frontoparietal narrowed at the back, was wedged between the squamosal bones, and ended in a depression above the occiput at the back of the skull. The parietal and squamosal bones formed a thick shelf over the occiput termed the parietosquamosal shelf, whose extent varied between specimens. The squamosal was large, not part of the dome, and the back part was swollen. It was ornamented by irregularly spaced tubercles (or round outgrowths), and a row of nodes (knobs) extended along its upper edges, ending in a pointed tubercle (or small horn) on each side at the back of the skull. An inner row of smaller tubercles ran parallel with the larger one. Except for the upper surface of the dome, much of the skull was ornamented with nodes, many arranged in rows.

The large orbit was shaped like an imperfect ellipse (with the longest axis from front to back), and faced to the side and slightly forward. The infratemporal fenestra (opening) behind the eye was narrow and sloped backwards, and the supratemporal fenestra on the top back of the skull was very reduced in size, due to the thickening of the frontoparietal. The basicranium (floor of the braincase) was shortened and distanced from the regions below the orbits and around the palate. The occiput sloped backwards and down, and the occipital condyle was deflected in the same direction. The lacrimal bone formed the lower front margin of the orbit, and its surface had rows of node-like ornamentation. The prefrontal and palpebral bones were fused and formed a thick ridge above the orbit. The relatively large jugal bone formed the lower margin of the orbit, extending far forwards and down towards the jaw joint. It was ornamented with ridges and nodes in a radiating arrangement.

The nasal openings were large and faced frontwards. The nasal bone was thick, heavily sculpted, and had a convex profile. It formed a boss (shield) on the middle top of the skull together with the frontal bone. The lower front of the premaxilla (front bone of the upper jaw) was rugose and thickened. A small foramen (hole) was present in the suture between the premaxillae, leading into the nasal cavity, and possibly connected to the Jacobson's organ (an olfactory sense organ). The maxilla was short and deep, and probably contained a sinus. The maxilla had a series of foramina that corresponded with each tooth position there, and these functioned as passages for erupting replacement teeth. The mandible articulated with the skull below the back of the orbit. The tooth-bearing part of the lower jaw was long, with the part behind being rather short. Though not preserved, the presence of a predentary bone is indicated by facets at the front of the lower jaw. Like other pachycephalosaurs, it would have had a small beak.

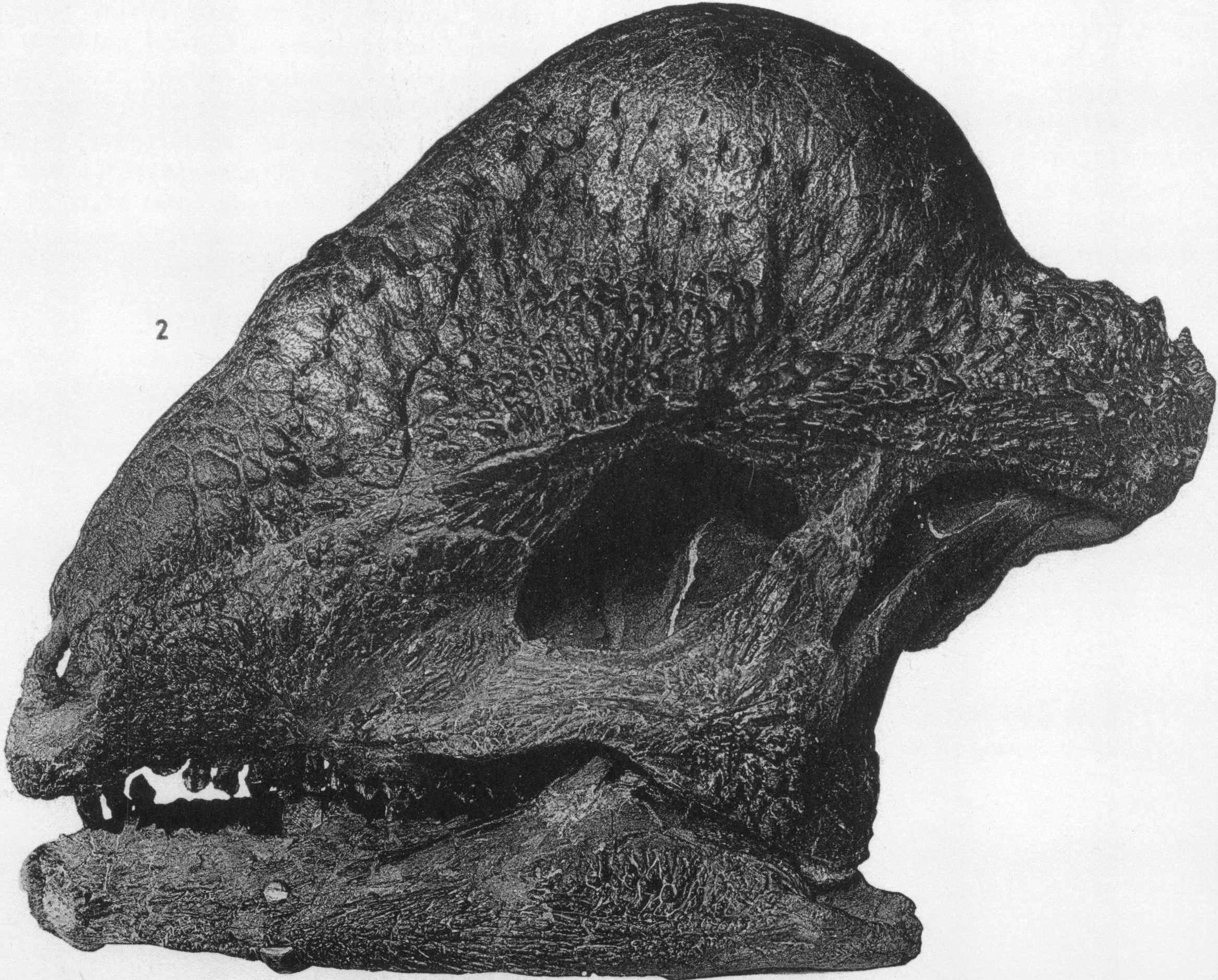
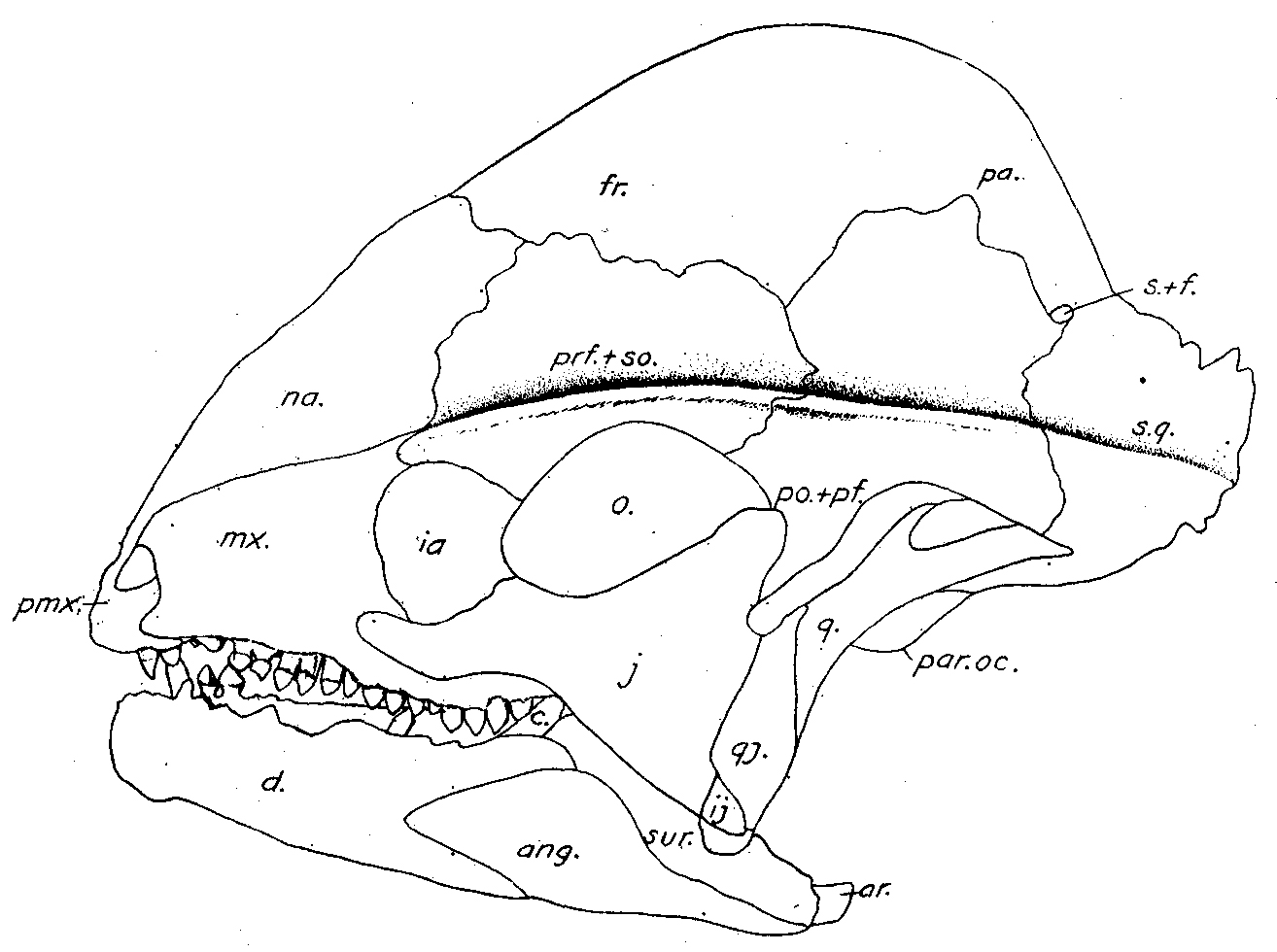
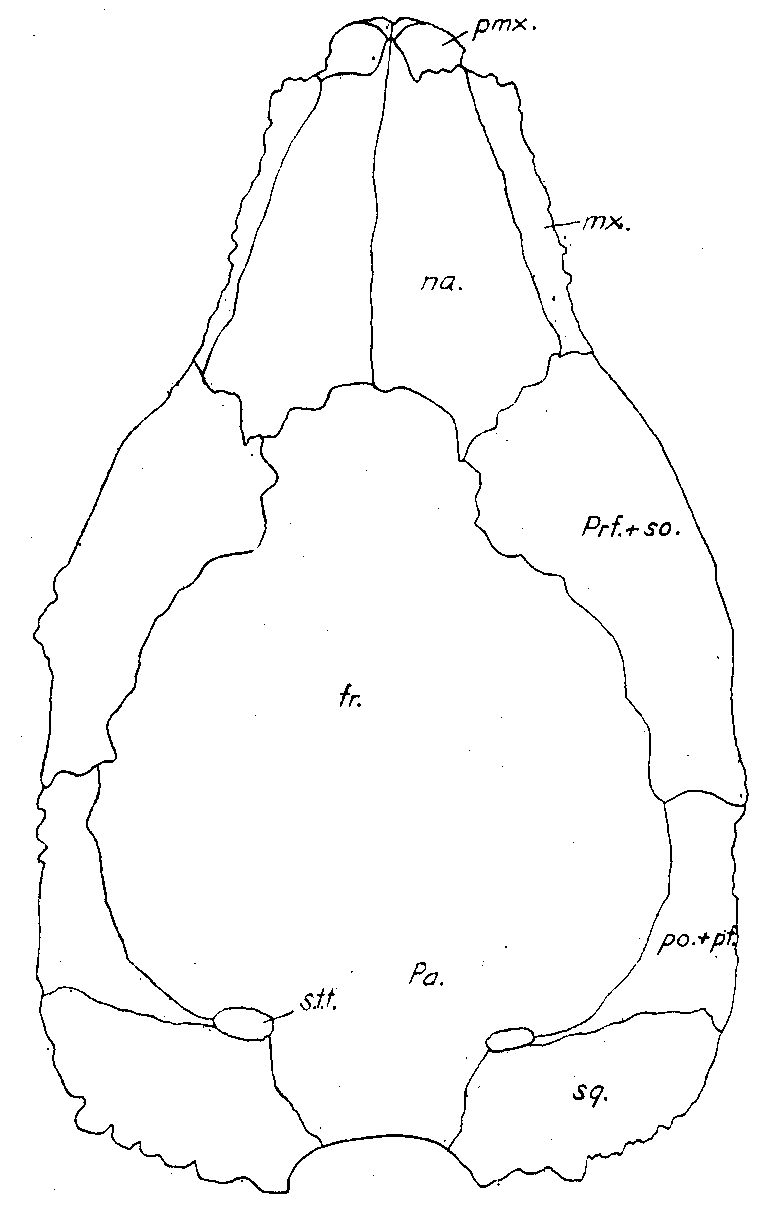
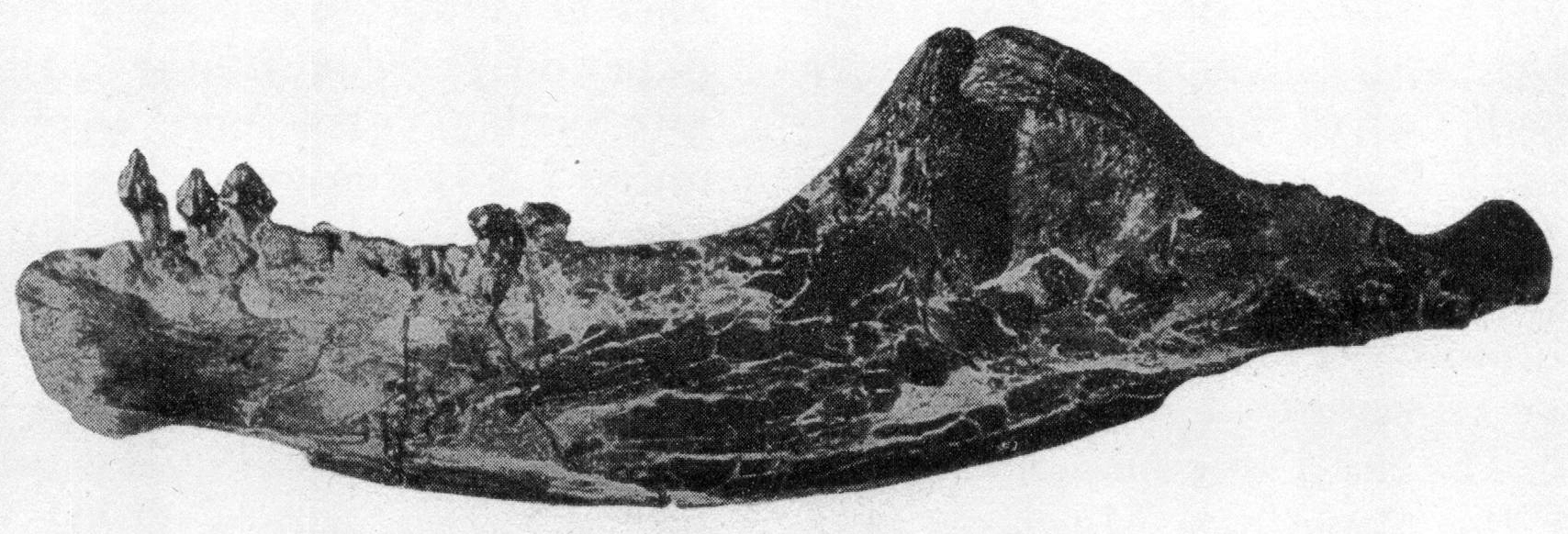
Skull and mandible of S. validum UALVP 2 and 1924 illustrations of same with labelled bones

Stegoceras had teeth that were heterodont (differentiated) and thecodont (placed in sockets). It had marginal rows of relatively small teeth, and the rows did not form a straight cutting edge. The teeth were set obliquely along the length of the jaws, and overlapped each other slightly from front to back. On each side, the most complete specimen (UALVP 2) had three teeth in the premaxilla, sixteen in the maxilla (both part of the upper jaw), and seventeen in the dentary of the lower jaw. The teeth in the premaxilla were separated from those behind in the maxilla by a short diastema (space), and the two rows in the premaxilla were separated by a toothless gap at the front. The teeth in the front part of the upper jaw (premaxilla) and front lower jaw were similar; these had taller, more pointed and recurved crowns, and a "heel" at the back. The front teeth in the lower jaw were larger than those of the upper jaw. The front edges of the crowns bore eight denticles (serrations), and the back edge bore nine to eleven. The teeth in the back of the upper (maxilla) and lower jaw were triangular in side view and compressed in front view. They had long roots that were oval in section, and the crowns had a marked cingulum at their bases. The denticles here were compressed and directed towards the top of the crowns. Both the outer and inner side of the tooth crowns bore enamel, and both sides were divided vertically by a ridge. Each edge had about seven or eight denticles, with the front edge usually having the most.

The skull of Stegoceras can be distinguished from those of other pachycephalosaurs by features such as its pronounced parietosquamosal shelf (though this became smaller with age), the "incipient" doming of its frontopariental (though the doming increased with age), its inflated nasal bones, its ornamentation of tubercles on the sides and back of the squamosal bones, rows of up to six tubercles on the upper side of each squamosal, and up to two nodes on the backwards projection of the parietal. It is also distinct in its lack of nasal ornamentation, and in having a reduced diastema. The skull of S. novomexicanum can be distinguished from that of S. validum in features such as the backwards extension of the parietal bone being more reduced and triangular, having larger supratemporal fenestrae (though this may be due to the possible juvenile status of the specimens), and having roughly parallel suture contacts between the squamosal and parietal. It also appears to have had a smaller frontal boss than S. validum, and seems to have been more gracile overall.

=== Postcranial skeleton ===
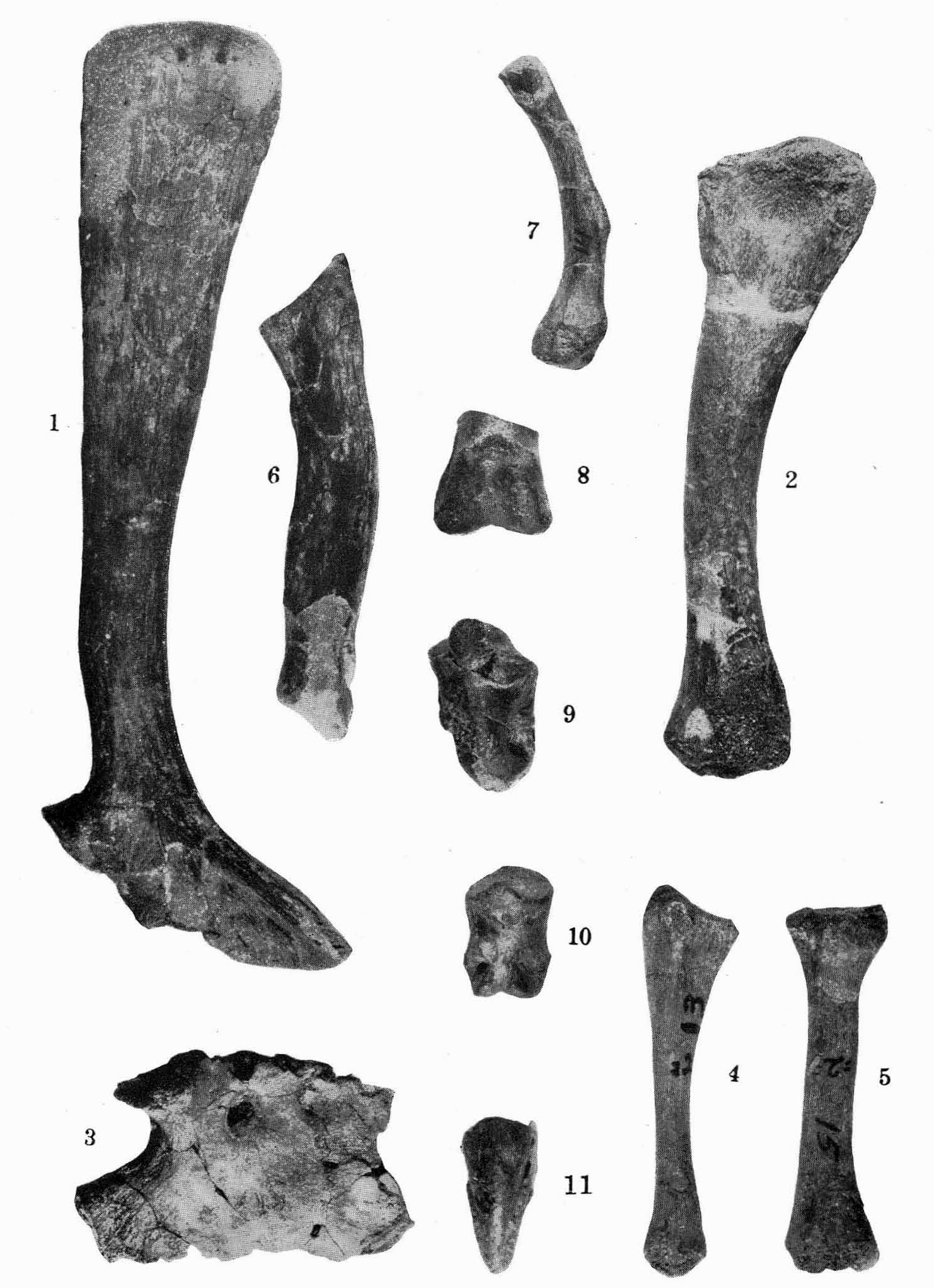
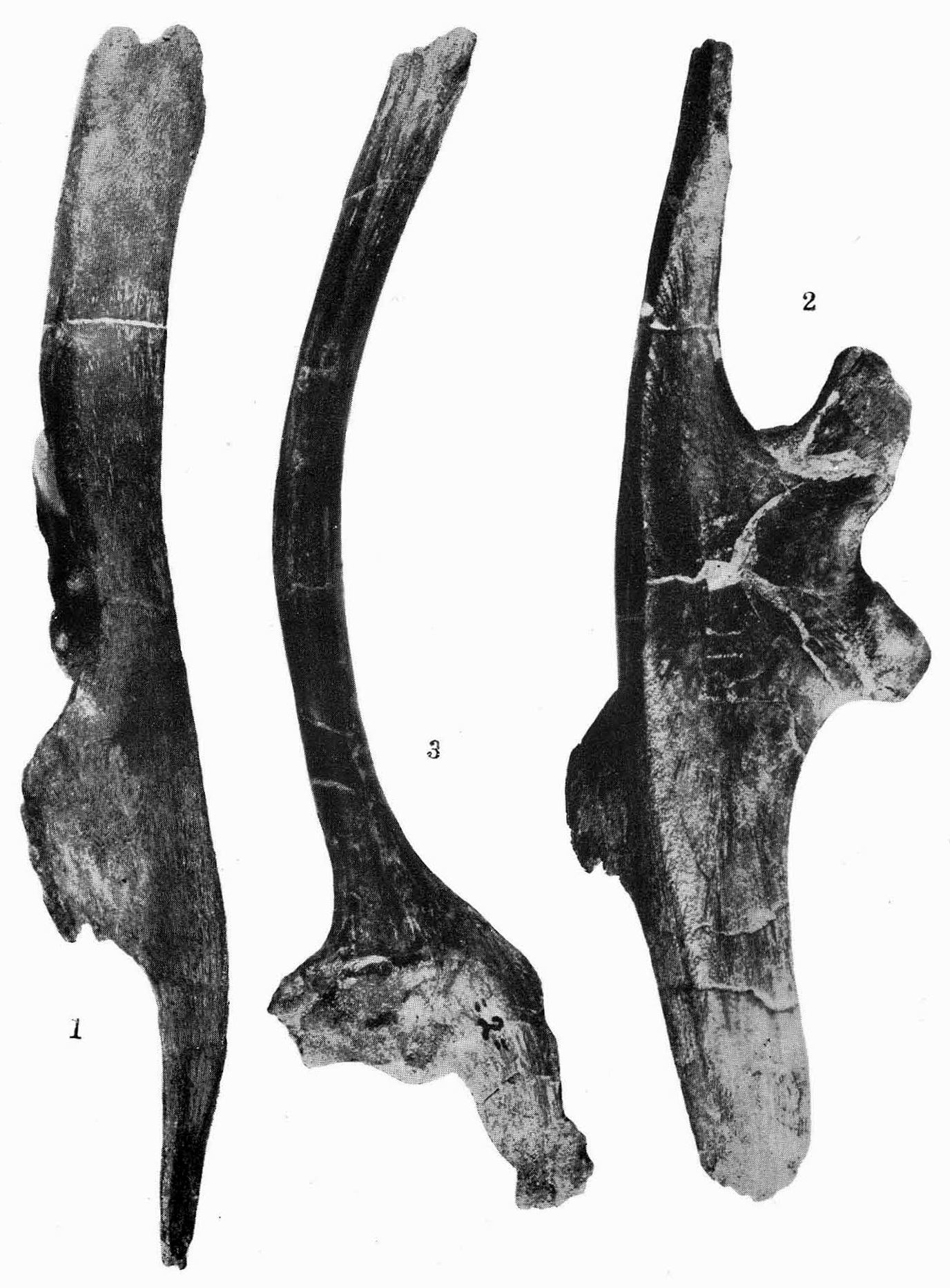
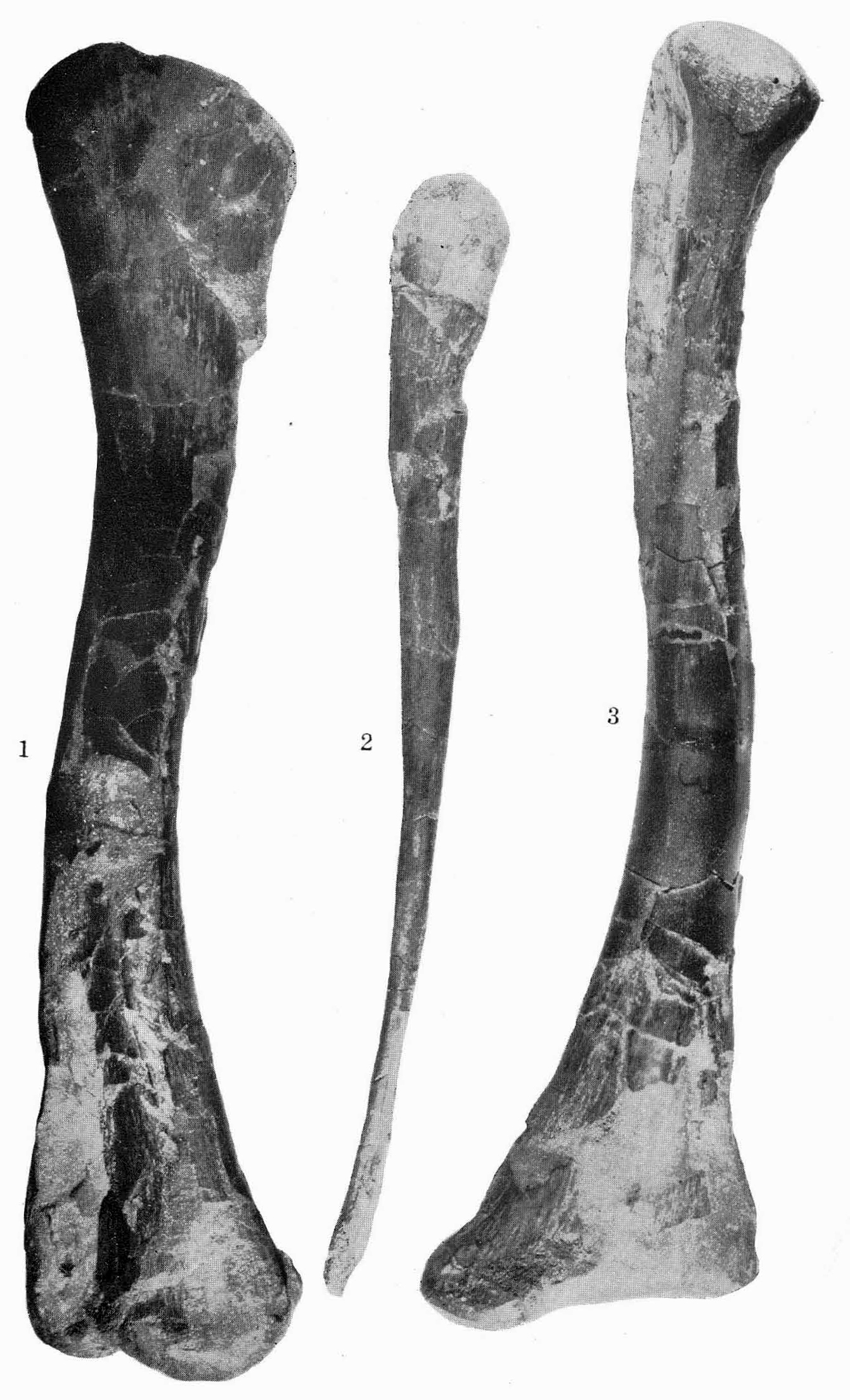
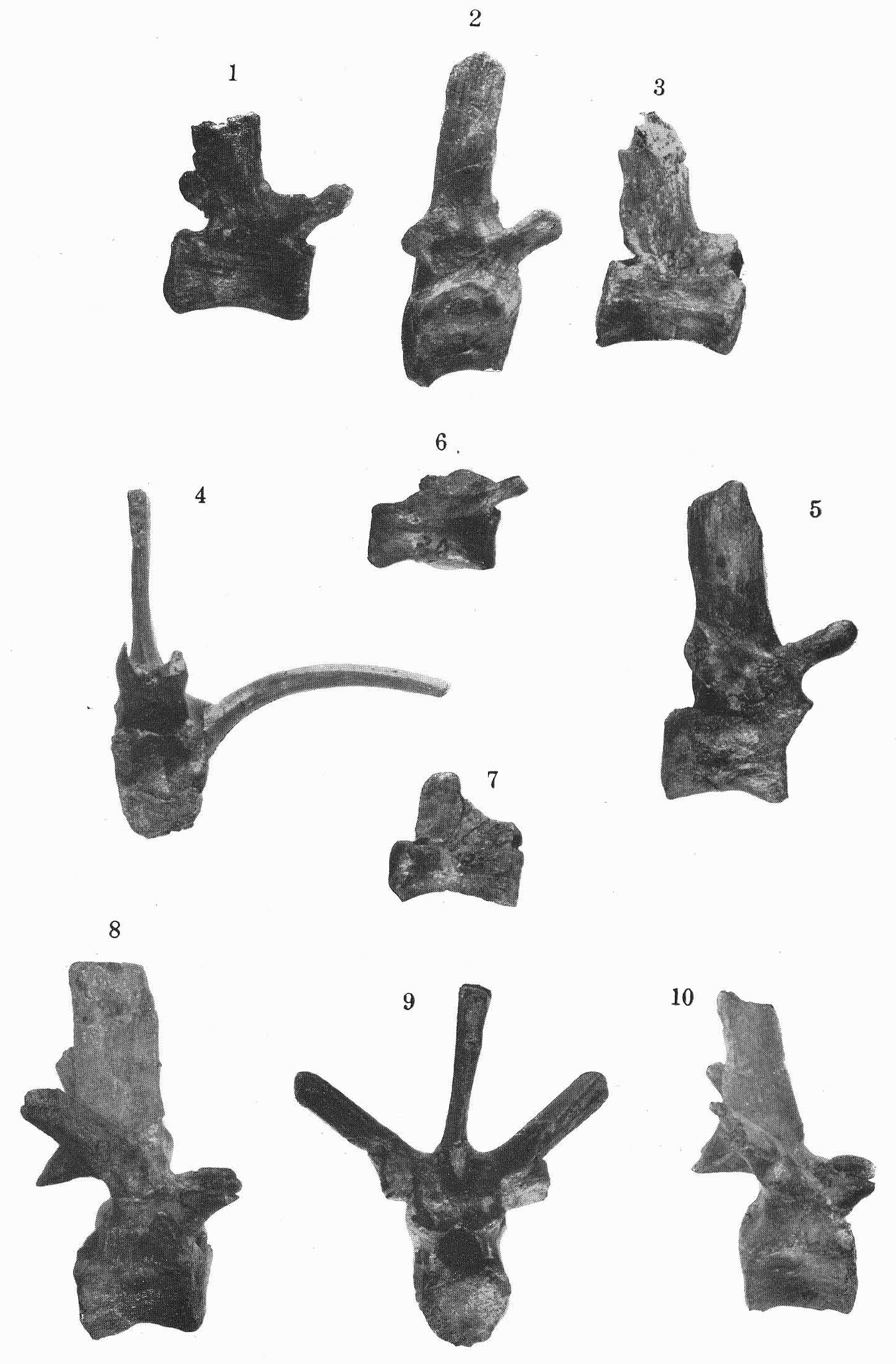
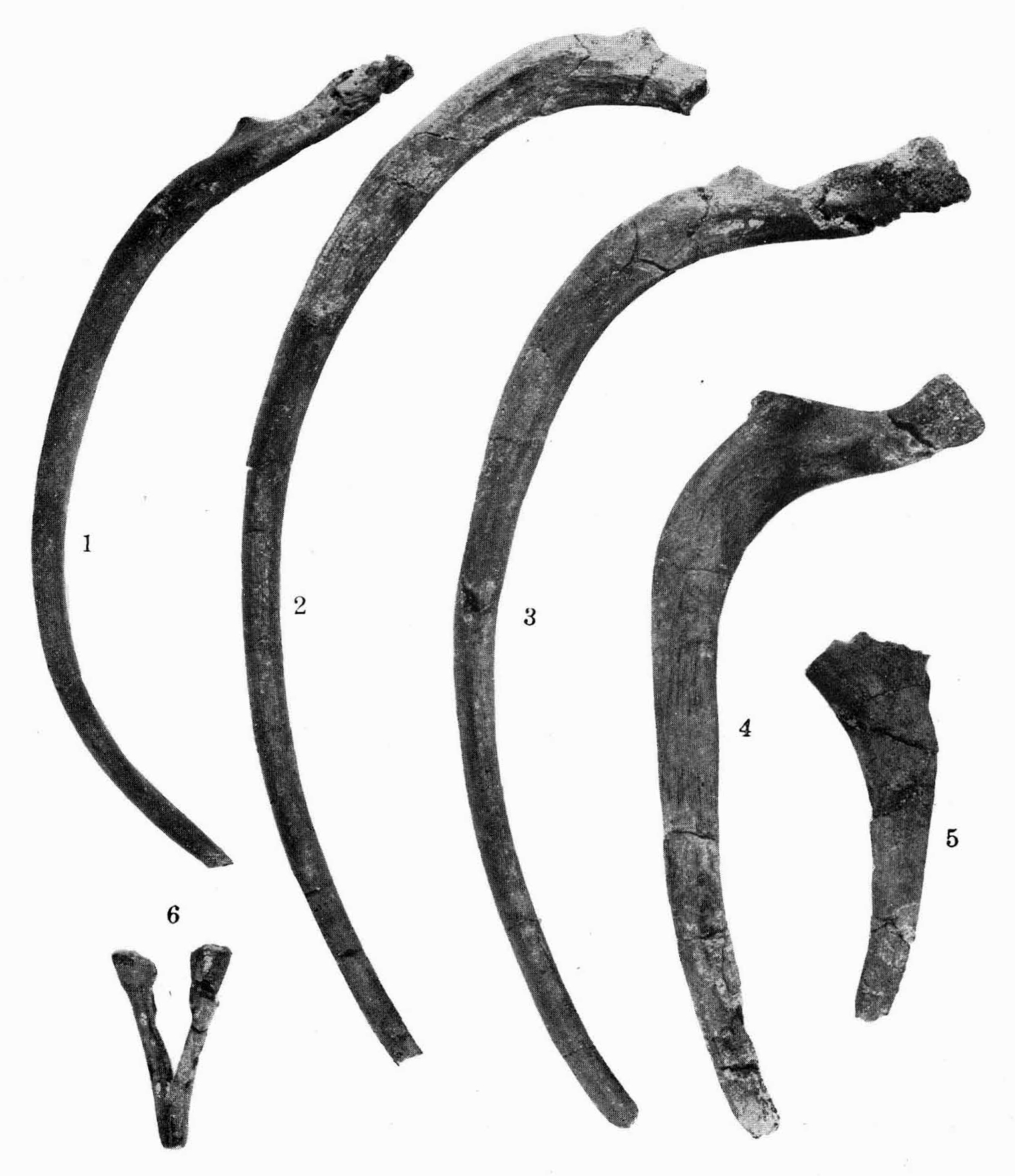
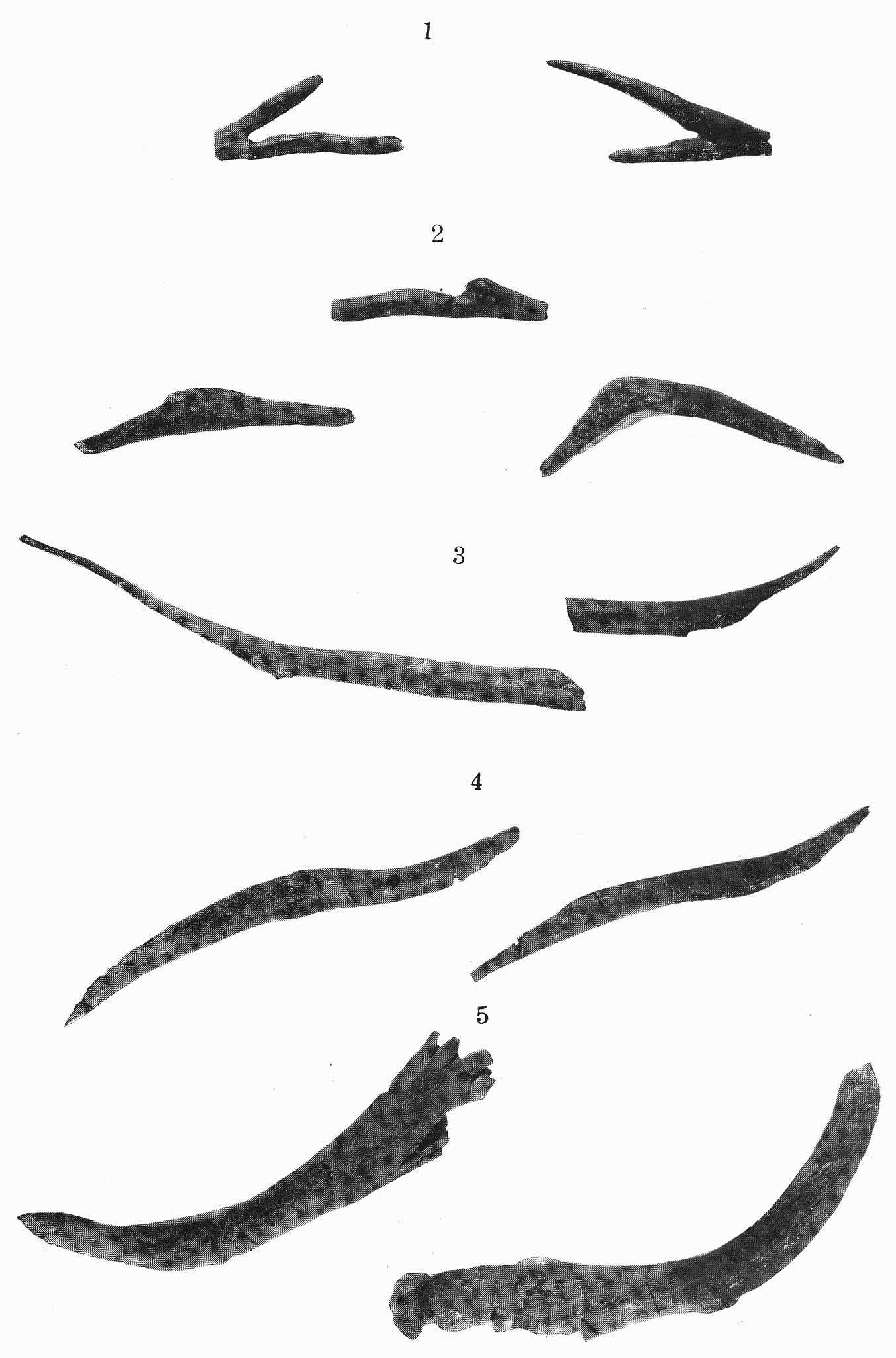
Bones of UALVP 2 including those of the limbs, pelvis, vertebrae, ribs, and ossified tail tendons

The vertebral column of Stegoceras is incompletely known. The articulation between the zygagophyses (articular processes) of successive dorsal (back) vertebrae appears to have prevented sideways movement of the vertebral column, which made it very rigid, and it was further strengthened by ossified tendons. Though the neck vertebrae are not known, the downturned occipital condyle (which articulates with the first neck vertebra) indicates that the neck was held in a curved posture, like the "S"- or "U"-shape of most dinosaur necks. Based on their position in Homalocephale, the ossified tendons found with UALVP 2 would have formed an intricate "caudal basket" in the tail, consisting of parallel rows, with the extremities of each tendon contacting the next successively. Such structures are called myorhabdoi, and are otherwise only known in teleost fish; the feature is unique to pachycephalosaurs among tetrapod (four-limbed) animals, and may have functioned in stiffening the tail.

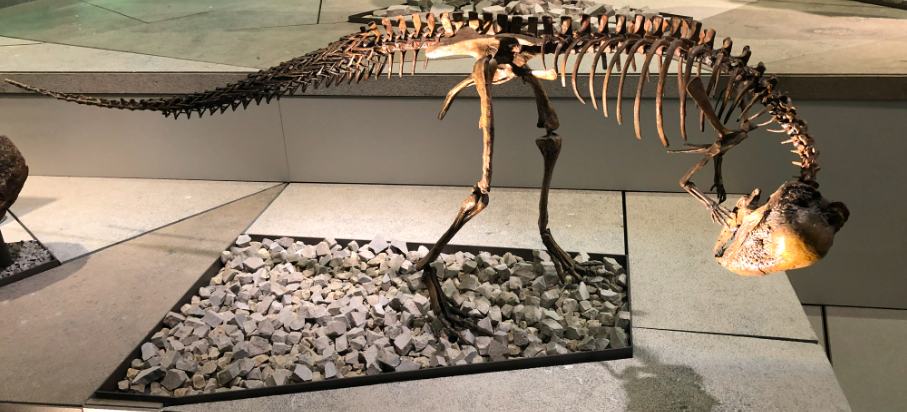
Reconstructed skeleton showing myorhabdoi in place on the tail, National Museum of Natural History

The scapula (shoulder blade) was longer than the humerus (upper arm bone); its blade was slender and narrow, and slightly twisted, following the contour of the ribs. The scapula did not expand at the upper end but was very expanded at the base. The coracoid was mainly thin and plate-like. The humerus had a slender shaft, was slightly twisted along its length, and was slightly bowed. The deltopectoral crest (where the deltoid and pectoral muscles attached) was weakly developed. The ends of the ulna were expanded, and ridges extended along the shaft. The radius was more robust than the ulna, which is unusual. When seen from above, the pelvic girdle was very broad for a bipedal archosaur, and became wider towards the hind part. The broadness of the pelvic region may have accommodated a rear extension of the gut. The ilium was elongated and the ischium was long and slender. Though the pubis is not known, it was probably reduced in size like that of Homalocephale. The femur (thigh bone) was slender and inwards curved, the tibia was slender and twisted, and the fibula was slender and wide at the upper end. The metatarsus of the foot appears to have been narrow, and the single known ungual (claw bone) of a toe was slender and slightly curved. Though the limbs of Stegoceras are not completely known, they were most likely like other pachycephalosaurs in having five-fingered hands and four toes.

== Classification ==
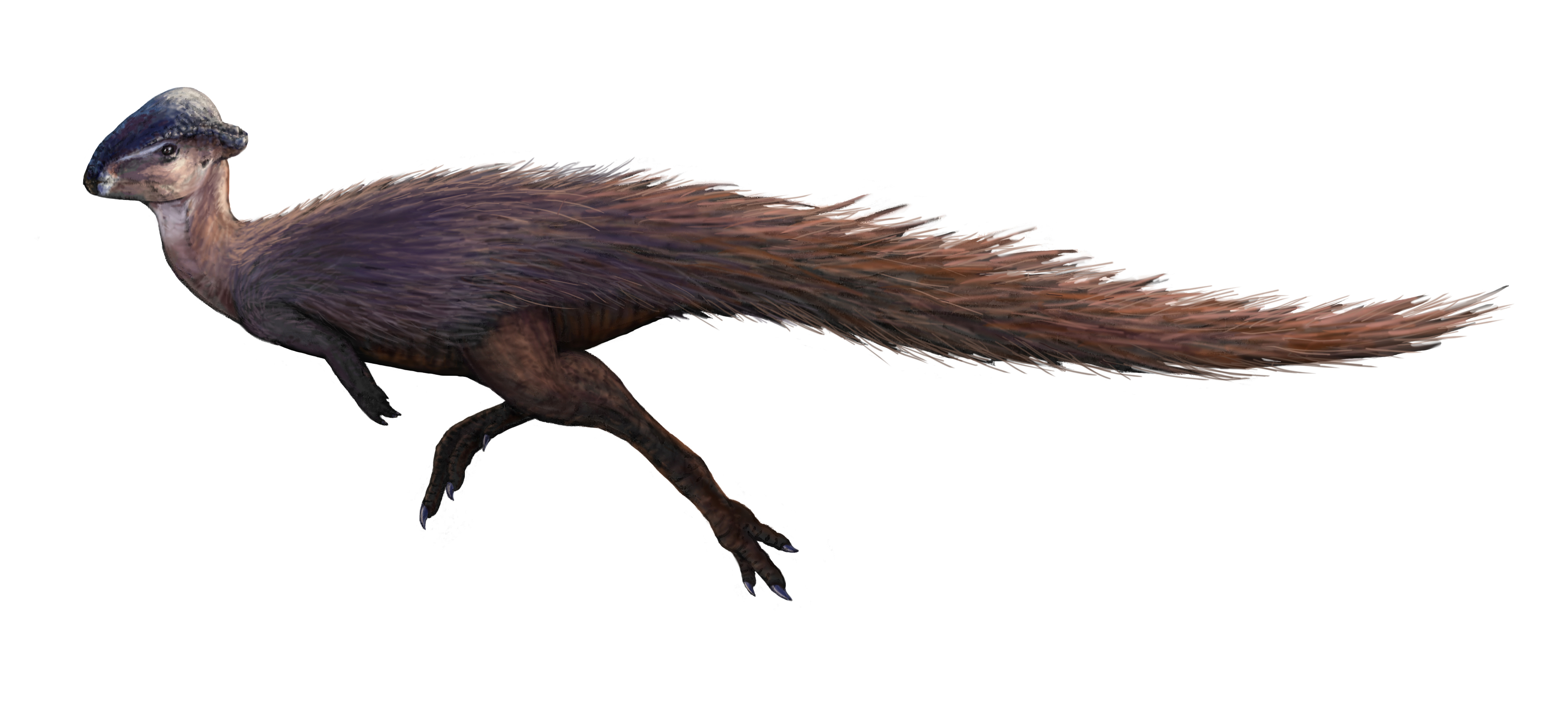
Life restoration of S. validum, with integument speculatively based on other small ornithischian dinosaurs

During the 1970s, more pachycephalosaur genera were described from Asian fossils, which provided more information about the group. In 1974, Maryańska and Osmólska concluded that pachycephalosaurs are distinct enough to warrant their own suborder within Ornithischia, Pachycephalosauria. In 1978, the Chinese palaeontologist Dong Zhiming split Pachycephalosauria into two families; the dome-headed Pachycephalosauridae (including Stegoceras) and the flat-headed Homalocephalidae (originally spelled Homalocephaleridae). Wall and Galton did not find suborder status for the pachycephalosaurs justified in 1979. By the 1980s, the affinities of the pachycephalosaurs within Ornithischia were unresolved. The main competing views were that the group was closest to either ornithopods or ceratopsians, the latter view due to similarities between the skeleton of Stegoceras and the "primitive" ceratopsian Protoceratops. In 1986, palaeontologist Paul Sereno supported the relationship between pachycephalosaurs and ceratopsians, and united them in the group Marginocephalia, based on similar cranial features, such as the "shelf"-structure above the occiput. He conceded that the evidence for this grouping was not overwhelming, but the validity of the group was supported by Sues and Galton in 1987.

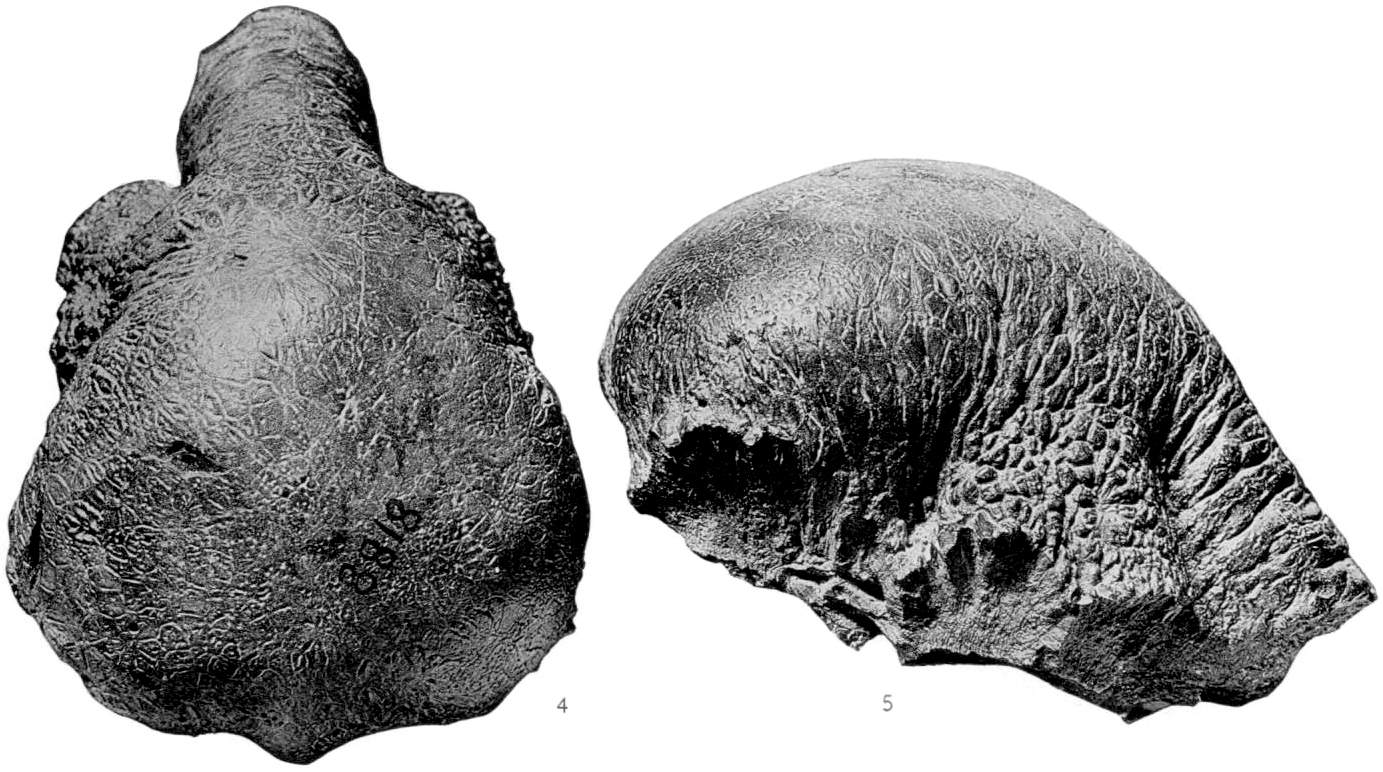
Holotype skull of the related Colepiocephale lambei, earlier thought to be a species of Stegoceras

By the early 21st century, few pachycephalosaur genera were known from postcranial remains, and many taxa were only known from domes, which made classification within the group difficult. Pachycephalosaurs are thus mainly defined by cranial features, such as the flat to domed frontoparietal, the broad and flattened bar along the postorbital and squamosal bones, and the squamosal bones being deep plates on the occiput. In 1986, Sereno had divided the pachycephalosaurs into different groups based on the extent of the doming of their skulls (grouped in now invalid taxa such as "Tholocephalidae" and "Domocephalinae"), and in 2000 he considered the "partially" domed Stegoceras a transition between the supposedly "primitive" flat-headed and advanced "fully" domed genera (such as Pachycephalosaurus). The dome-headed/flat-headed division of the pachycephalosaurs was abandoned in the following years, as flat heads were considered paedomorphic (juvenile-like) or derived ("advanced") traits in most revisions, but not a sexually dimorphic trait. In 2006, Sullivan argued against the idea that the extent of doming was useful in determining taxonomic affinities between pachycephalosaurs. In 2003, Sullivan found Stegoceras itself to be more basal (or "primitive") than the "fully-domed" members of the subfamily Pachycephalosaurinae, elaborating on conclusions reached by Sereno in 1986.

A 2013 phylogenetic analysis by Evans and colleagues found that some flat-headed pachycephalosaur genera were more closely related to "fully" domed taxa than to the "incompletely" domed Stegoceras, which suggests they represent juveniles of domed taxa, and that flat heads do not indicate taxonomic affinities. The cladogram below shows the placement of Stegoceras within Pachycephalosauridae according to Schott and colleagues, 2016:

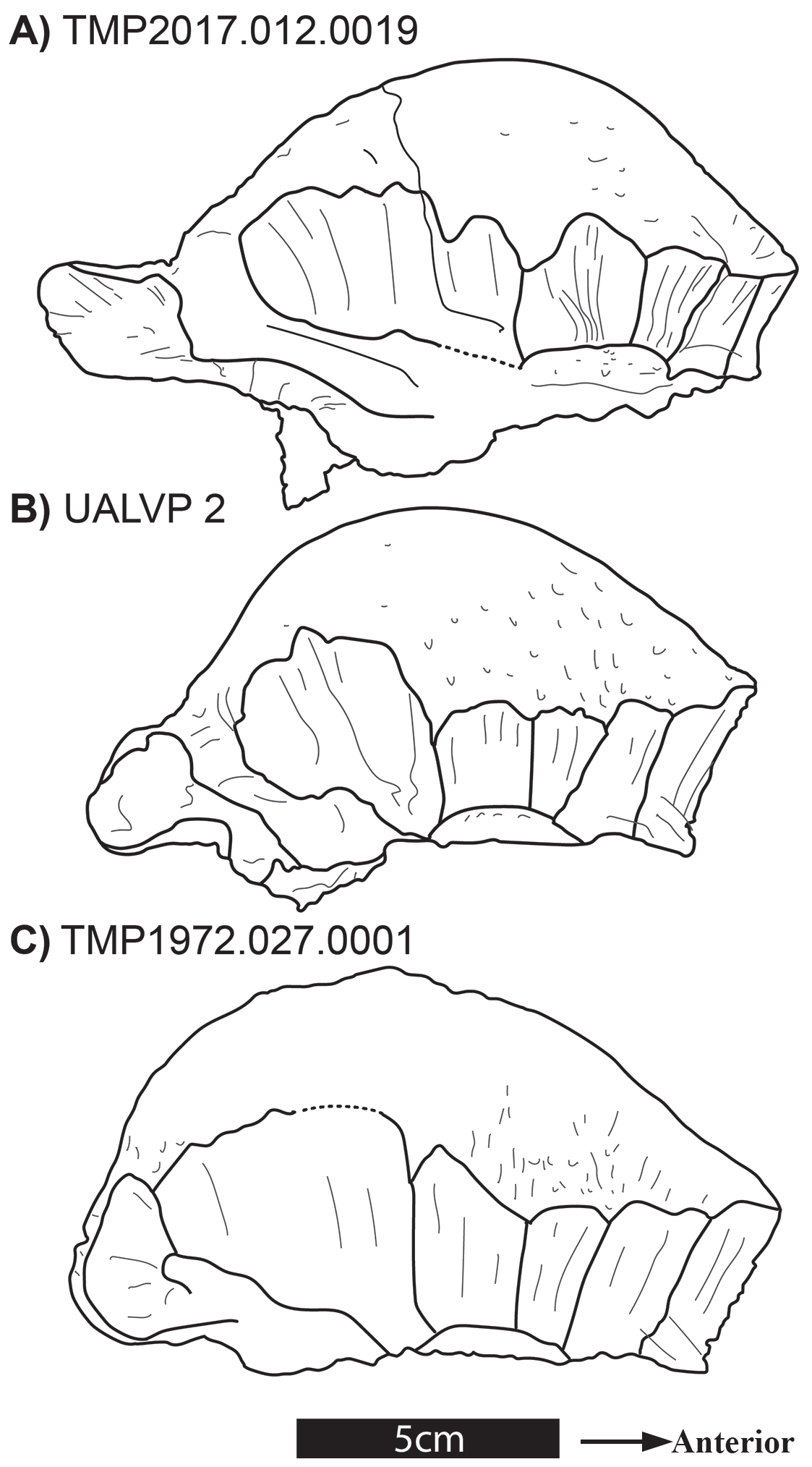
Frontoparietal variation in adult S. validum

- Pachycephalosauria
  - Wannanosaurus yansiensis
  - Pachycephalosauridae
    - - Hanssuesia sternbergi
      - Colepiocephale lambei
      - Stegoceras validum
      - Stegoceras novomexicanum
    - Pachycephalosaurinae
      - Goyocephale lattimorei
      - - Homalocephale calathocercos
        - - Tylocephale gilmorei
          - - Foraminacephale brevis
            - - Amtocephale gobienses
              - - Prenocephale prenes
                - Acrotholus audeti
                - - - Pachycephalosaurus wyomingensis
                    - Alaskacephale gangloffi
                    - - Dracorex hogwartsia
                      - Stygimoloch spinifer
                  - - Sphaerotholus goodwini
                    - Sphaerotholus buchholtzae

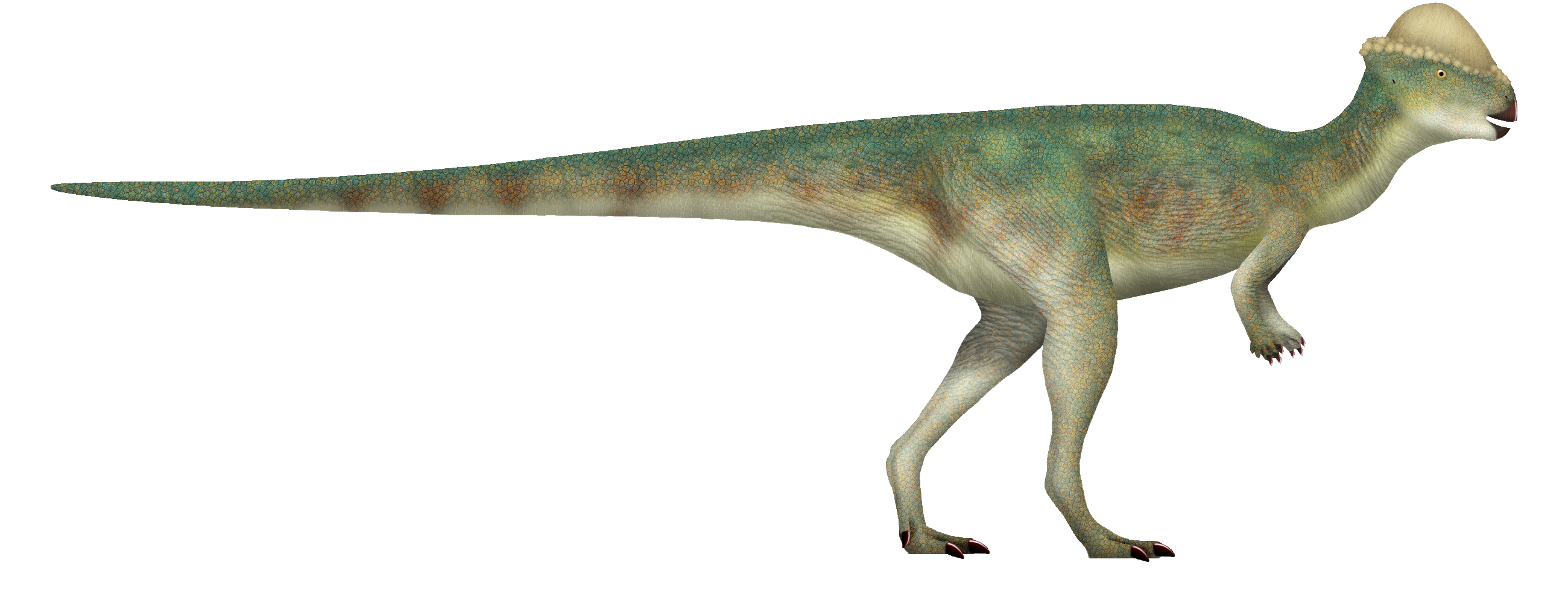
Life restoration of the possible species S. novomexicanum

The biogeography and early evolutionary history of pachycephalosaurs is poorly understood, and can only be clarified by new discoveries. Pachycephalosaurs appear abruptly in the fossil record, and are present in both North America and Asia, so it is unknown when they first originated, and from which direction they dispersed. The oldest known members of the group (such as Acrotholus) are "fully domed" and known from the Santonian stage of the Late Cretaceous period (about 84 million years ago). This is before the supposedly more primitive Stegoceras from the Middle Campanian (77 million years ago) and Homalocephale from the Early Maastrichtian (70 million years ago), so the doming of the skull may be a homoplastic trait (a form of convergent evolution). The late occurrence of pachycephalosaurs compared to the related ceratopsians indicates a long ghost lineage (inferred, but missing from the fossil record) spanning 66 million years, from the Late Jurassic to the Cretaceous. Since pachycephalosaurs were mainly small, this may be due to taphonomic bias; smaller animals are less likely to be preserved through fossilisation. More delicate bones are also less likely to be preserved, which is why pachycephalosaurs are mainly known from their robust skulls.

== Palaeobiology ==
=== Feeding mechanics ===
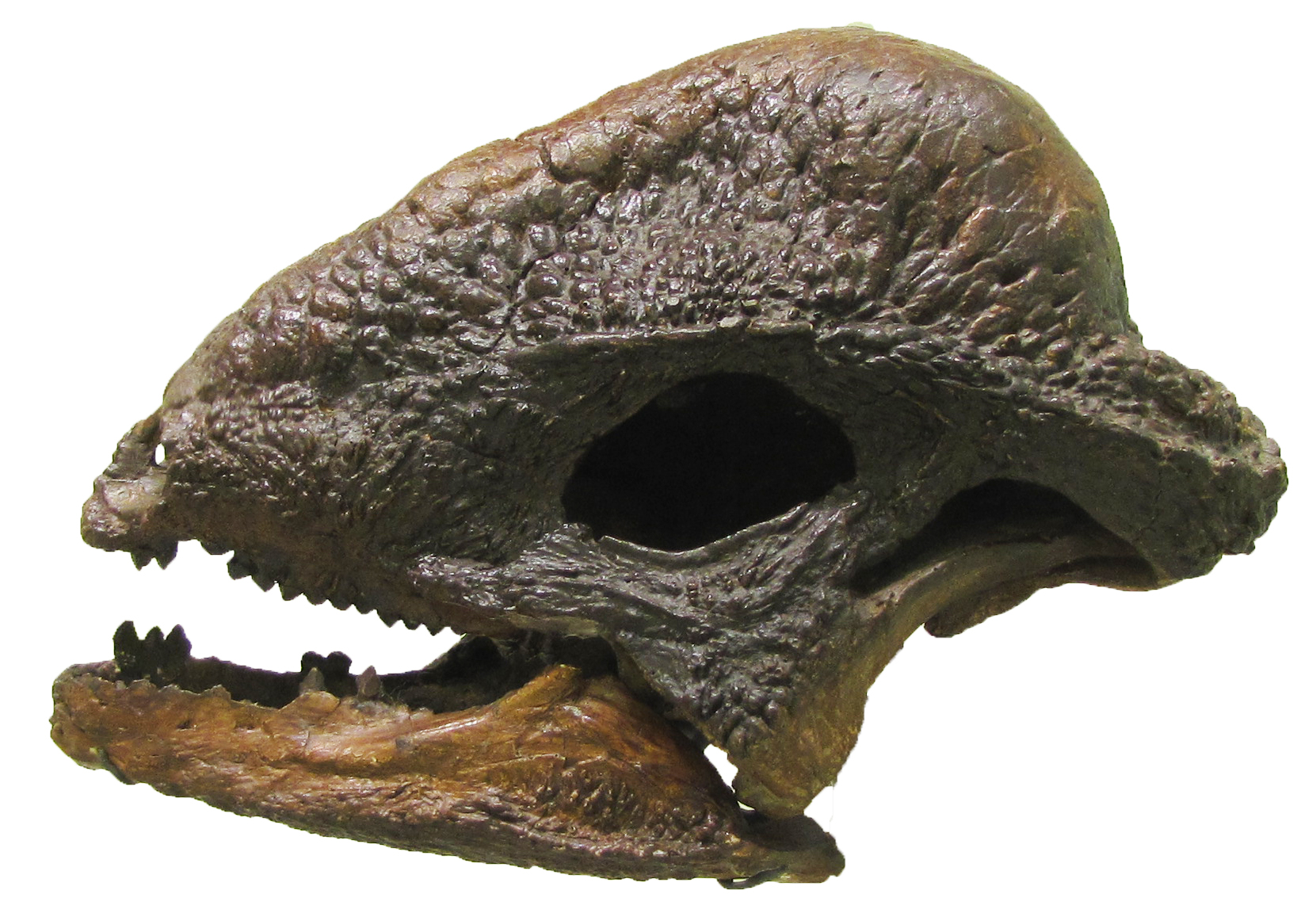
Cast of specimen UALVP 2's skull, showing teeth and jaws

It is uncertain what pachycephalosaurs ate; having very small, ridged teeth they could not have chewed tough, fibrous plants as effectively as other dinosaurs of the same period. It is assumed that their sharp, serrated teeth were ideally suited for a mixed diet of leaves, seeds, fruit and insects. Sues and Galton suggested in 1987 that Stegoceras may have had an entirely herbivorous diet, as the tooth crowns were similar to those of iguanid lizards. The premaxillary teeth show wear facets from contact with the predentary bone, and the maxillary teeth have double wear facets similar to those seen in other ornithischian dinosaurs. Every third maxillary tooth of UALVP 2 are erupting replacement teeth, and tooth replacement happened in backwards progression in sequential threes. The occipital region of Stegoceras was well-demarcated for muscle-attachment and it is believed that the jaw movement of Stegoceras and other pachycephalosaurs was mostly limited to up-and-down motions with only a slight capability for jaw rotation. This is based on the structure of the jaw and dental microwear and wear facets of the teeth indicate that the bite-force was used more for shearing than for crushing.

In 2021, palaeontologist Michael N. Hudgins and colleagues examined the teeth of Stegoceras and Thescelosaurus and found that while both had heterodont teeth, they could be statistically distinguished from each other. Due to its broad rostrum and more uniform teeth, Stegoceras was an indiscriminate bulk-feeder that cropped large amounts of vegetation, while the teeth and narrow rostrum of Thescelosaurus indicates it was a selective feeder. Pachycephalosaurs and Thescelosaurids occur in the same North American formations, and it appears that their coexistence was made possible by them occupying different ecomorphospaces (though Stegoceras and Thescelosaurus themselves were not contemporaries).

In 2026, palaeontologists Louis-Philippe Bateman and Hans C.E. Larsson examined the feeding performance in pachycephalosaurs using Stegoceras as a model, and found that the presence of their domes limited the space and movement of their jaw muscles. Compared with other orhithischians, the feeding performance of Stegoceras was closer to basal ornithiscians and ornithopods than would be expected of a derived taxon from the Late Cretaceous. They concluded that the dome constrained pachycephalosaurs to a more plesiomorphic (ancestral) dentition with a low-fiber herbivorous niche, and that it was an example of a sociosecual display structure constraining evolution of feeding traits.

=== Nasal passages ===
In 1989, Emily B. Griffin found that Stegoceras and other pachycephalosaurs had a good sense of smell (olfaction), based on the study of cranial endocasts that showed large olfactory bulbs in the brain. In 2014, Jason M. Bourke and colleagues found that Stegoceras would have needed cartilaginous nasal turbinates in the front of the nasal passages for airflow to reach the olfactory region. Evidence for the presence of this structure is a bony ridge to which it could have attached. The size of the olfactory region also indicates that Stegoceras had a keen sense of smell. The researchers found that the dinosaur could have had either a scroll-shaped turbinate (like in a turkey) or a branched one (as in an ostrich) as both could have directed air to the olfactory region. The blood vessel system in the passages also suggest that the turbinates served to cool down warm arterial blood from the body that was heading to the brain. The skull of S. validum specimen UALVP 2 was suited for a study of this kind due to its exceptional preservation; it has ossified soft tissue in the nasal cavity, which would otherwise be cartilaginous and therefore not preserved through mineralization.

=== Ontogenetic changes ===
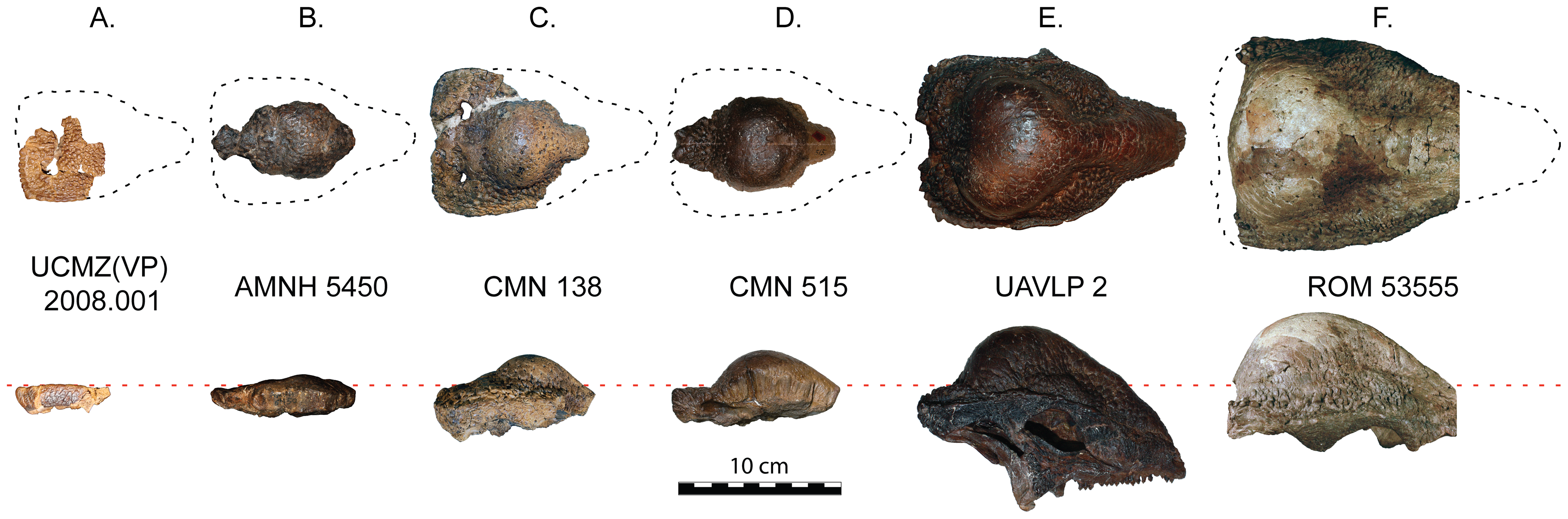
Growth series of S. validum skulls, according to a 2011 study

Several explanations have historically been proposed for the variation seen in the skulls of Stegoceras and other pachycephalosaurs. Brown and Schlaikjer suggested that there was sexual dimorphism in the degree of doming, and hypothesized that flat-headed specimens such as AMNH 5450 (Ornatotholus) represented the female morph of Stegoceras. This idea was supported by a 1981 morphometric study by Champan and colleagues, which found that males had larger and thicker domes. After other flat-headed pachycephalosaurs were discovered, the degree of doming was proposed to be a feature with taxonomic importance, and AMNH 5450 was therefore considered a distinct taxon from 1979 onwards. In 1998, Goodwin and colleagues instead proposed that the inflation of the dome was an ontogenetic feature that changed with age, based on a histological study of an S. validum skull that showed the dome consisted of vascular, fast-growing bone, consistent with an increase in doming through age. These authors found that the supposedly distinct features of Ornatotholus could easily be the results of ontogeny.

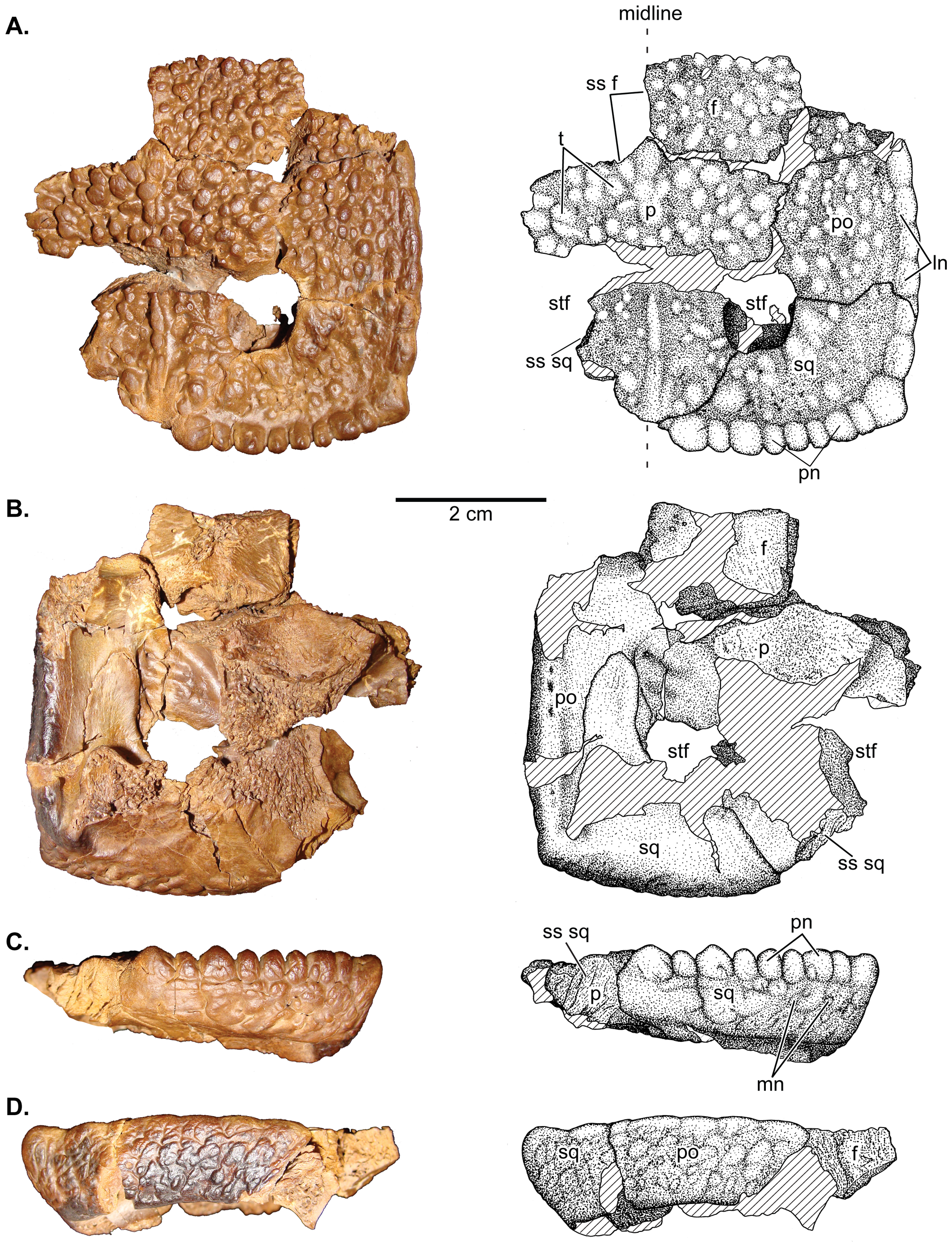
Partial skull of a juvenile, flat-headed S. validum, UCMZ(VP) 2008.001

In 2003, Williamson and Carr published a hypothetical growth series of S. validum, showing Ornatotholus as the juvenile stage. They suggested that juveniles were characterized by a flat, thickened frontoparietal roof, with larger supratemporal fenestrae, and studded with closely spaced tubercles and nodes. The parietosquamosal shelf was not reduced in size, and the frontoparietal suture was open. Sub-adults had mound-like domes, with the back part of the parietal and skull-roof being flat. The supratemporal fenestrae showed asymmetry in size, and the closure of the frontoparietal suture was variable. The nodes were stretched or almost obliterated as the dome expanded during growth, with a tesserated surface remaining. The pattern was often obliterated at the highest point (apex) of the dome, the area where maximum expansion occurred. The tubercles on the skull were stretched in different directions, and those at the margin of the parietosquamosal shelf may have been hypertrophied (enlarged) tubercles. The back and sides of sub-adult and adult skulls were ornamented by less modified tubercles. Before being incorporated into the enlarging dome, the skull bones expanded, resulting in junctions between these bones. The adult dome was broad and convex, and incorporated most of the shelf, which was reduced in size and overhung the occiput as a thick "lip". The supratempooral fenestrae were closed, but the suture between the frontoparietal and connected skull bones was not always closed in adults and subadults.

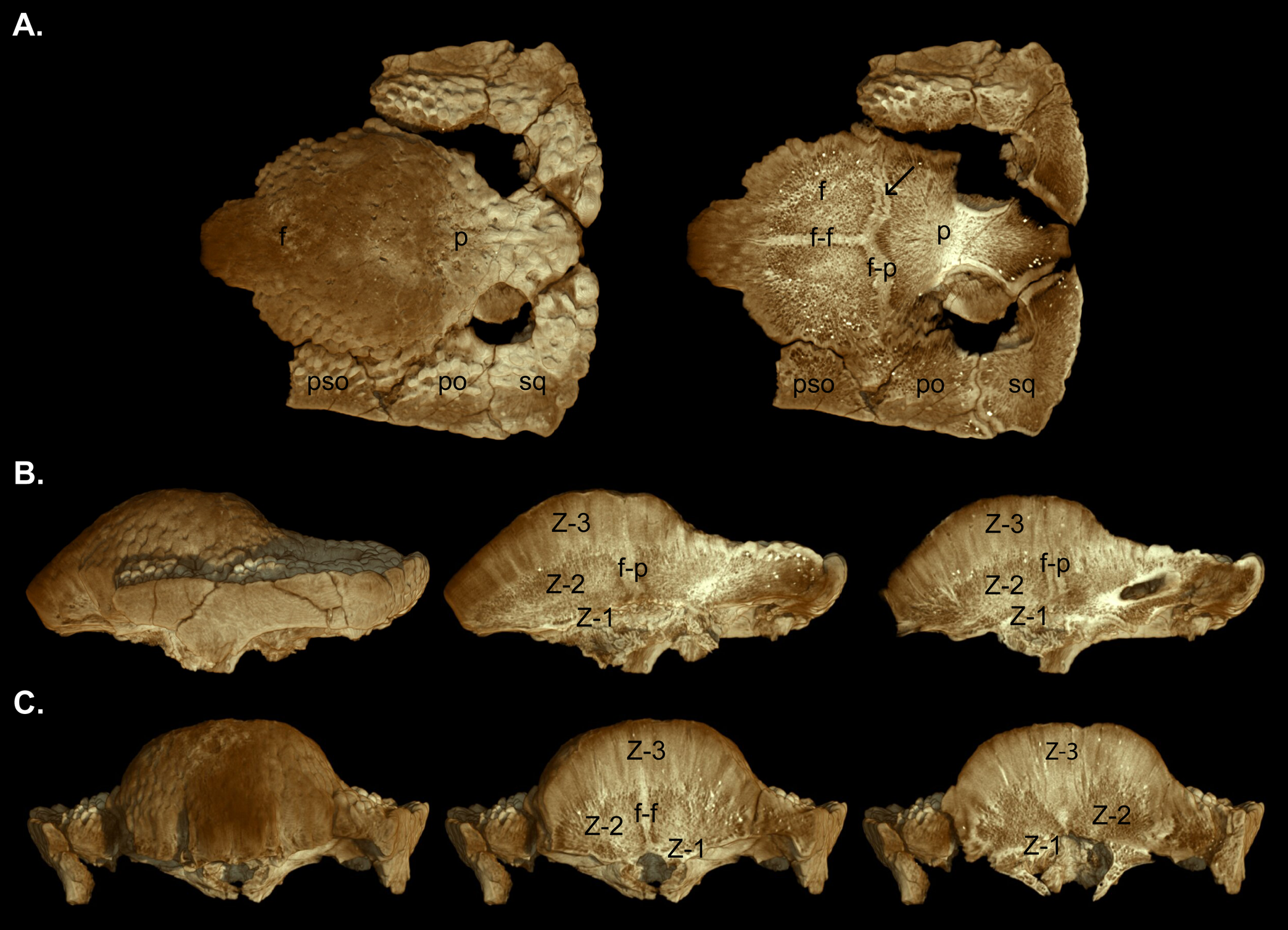
CT images of TMP 84.5.1, a juvenile or subadult S. validum, with sections

In 2011, Schott and colleagues made a more comprehensive analysis of cranial dome ontogeny in S. validum. The study found that the parietosquamosal shelf conserved the arrangement of ornamentation throughout growth, and that vascularity of the frontoparietal domes decreased with size. It also found that dome shape and size was strongly correlated with growth, and that growth was allometric (in contrast to isometric) from flat to domed, supporting Ornatotholus as a juvenile Stegoceras. They also hypothesized that this model of dome growth, with dramatic changes from juvenile to adult, was the common developmental trajectory of pachycephalosaurs. These researchers noted that though Williamson and Carr's observation that the supratemporal fenestrae closed with age was generally correct, there was still a high degree of individual variation in the size of these fenestrae, regardless of the size of the frontoparietal, and this feature may therefore have been independent of ontogeny.

A 2012 study by Schott and Evans found that the number and shape of the individual nodes on the squamosal shelf of the examined S. validum skulls varied considerably, and that this variability does not seem to correlate with ontogenic changes, but was due to individual variation. These researchers found no correlation between the width of supratemporal fenestrae and the size of the squamosal.

=== Dome function ===
The function of pachycephalosaur domes has been debated, and Stegoceras has been used as a model for experimentation in various studies. The dome has mainly been interpreted as a weapon used in intra-specific combat, a sexual display structure, or a means for species recognition.

==== Combat ====
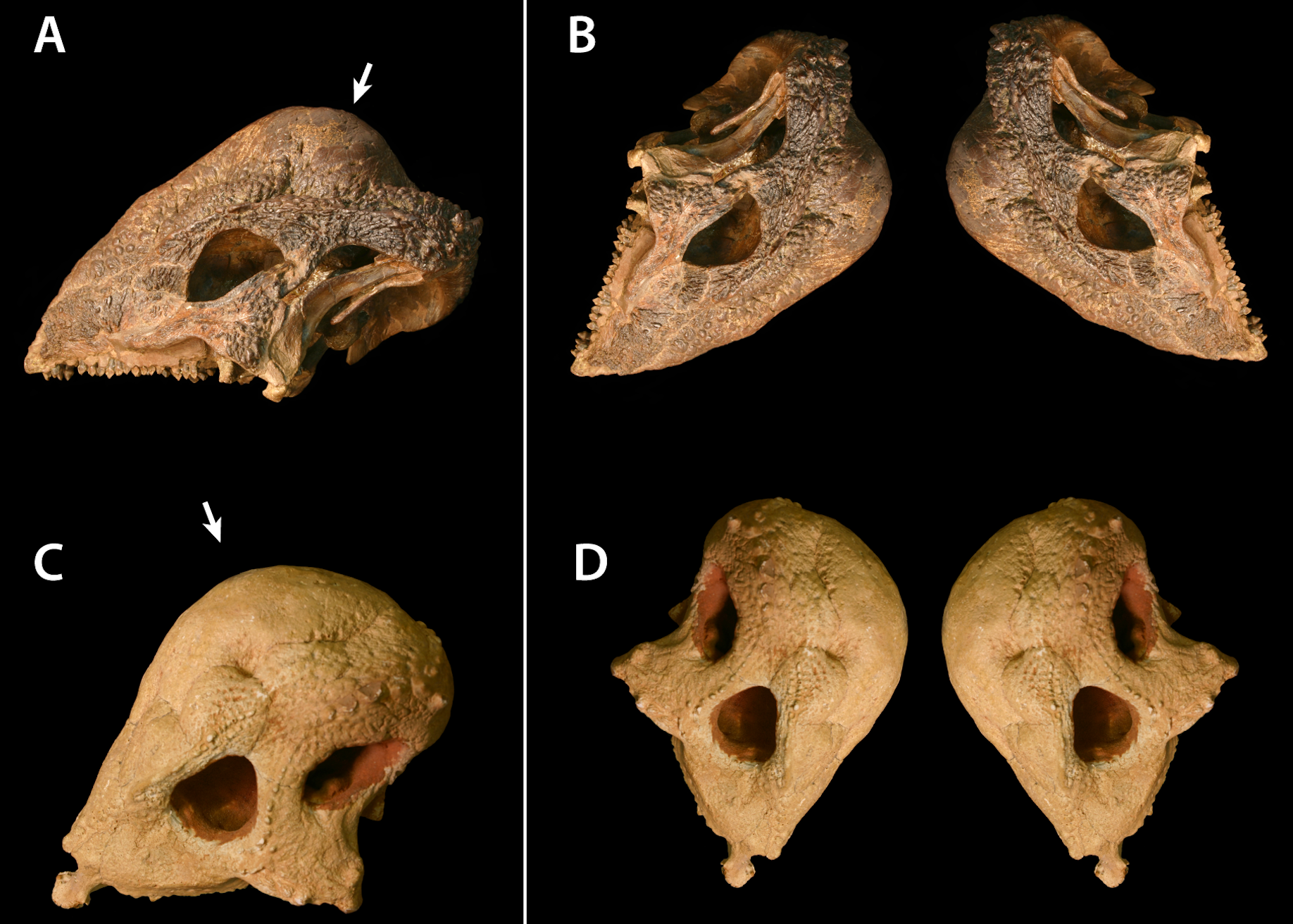
Apex of S. validum and Prenocephale skulls (left, arrows), with possible combat orientations (right), according to a 2013 study

The hypothesis that the domed skulls of Stegoceras and other pachycephalosaurs were used for butting heads was first suggested by palaeontologist Edwin Colbert in 1955. In 1970 and 1971, Galton elaborated on this idea, and argued that if the dome was simply ornamental, it would have been less dense, and that the structure was ideal for resisting force. Galton suggested that when Stegoceras held its skull vertically, perpendicular to the neck, force would be transmitted from the skull, with little chance of it being dislocated, and the dome could therefore be used as a battering-ram. He believed it was unlikely to have been used mainly as defence against predators, because the dome itself lacked spikes, and those of the parietosquamosal shelf were in an "ineffective" position, but found it compatible with intra-specific competition. Galton imagined the domes were bashed together, while the vertebral column was held in a horizontal position. This could either be done while facing each other while dealing blows, or while charging each other with lowered heads (analogous to modern sheep and goats). He also noted that the rigidity of the back would have been useful when using the head for this purpose. In 1978, Sues agreed with Galton that the anatomy of pachycephalosaurs was consistent with transmitting dome-to-dome impact stress, based on tests with plexi-glass models. The impact would be absorbed through the neck and body, and neck ligaments and muscles would prevent injuries by glancing blows (as in modern bighorn sheep). Sues also suggested that the animals could have butted each other's flanks.

In 1997, palaeontologist Kenneth Carpenter pointed out that the dorsal vertebrae from the back of the pachycephalosaur Homalocephale show that the back curved downwards just before the neck (which was not preserved), and unless the neck curved upwards, the head would point to the ground. He therefore inferred that the necks of Stegoceras and other pachycephalosaurs were held in a curved posture (as is the norm in dinosaurs), and that they would therefore not have been able to align their head, neck, and body horizontally straight, which would be needed to transmit stress. Their necks would have to be held below the level of the back, which would have risked damaging the spinal cord on impact. Modern bighorn sheep and bison overcome this problem by having strong ligaments from the neck to the tall neural spines over the shoulders (which absorb the force of impact), but such features are not known in pachycephalosaurs. These animals also absorb the force of impact through sinus chambers at the base of their horns, and their foreheads and horns form a broad contact surface, unlike the narrow surface of pachycephalosaur domes. Because the dome of Stegoceras was rounded, it would have given a very small area for potential impact, and the domes would have glanced off each other (unless the impact was perfectly centred). Combating pachycephalosaurs would have had difficulty seeing each other while their heads were lowered, due to the bony ridges above the eyes.

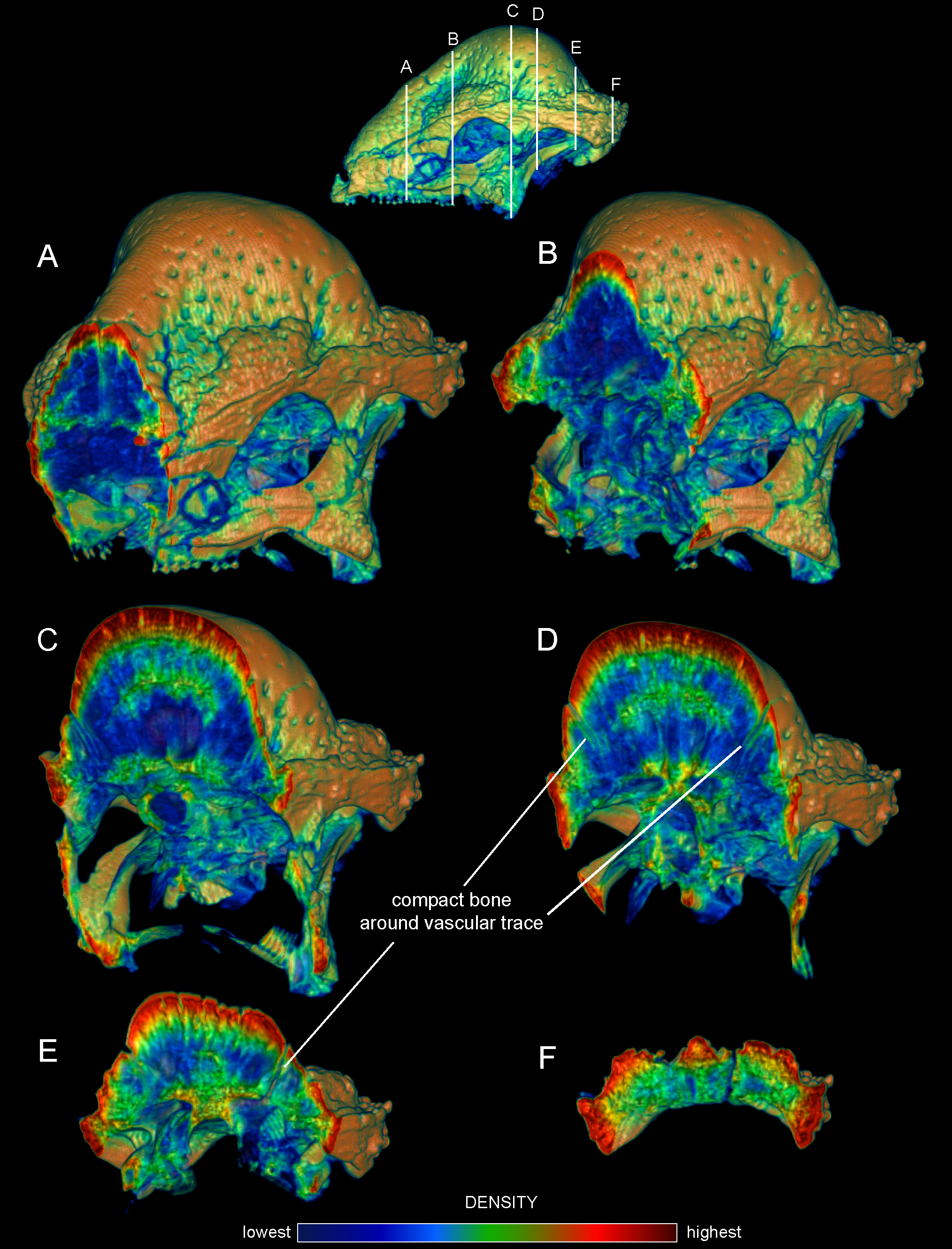
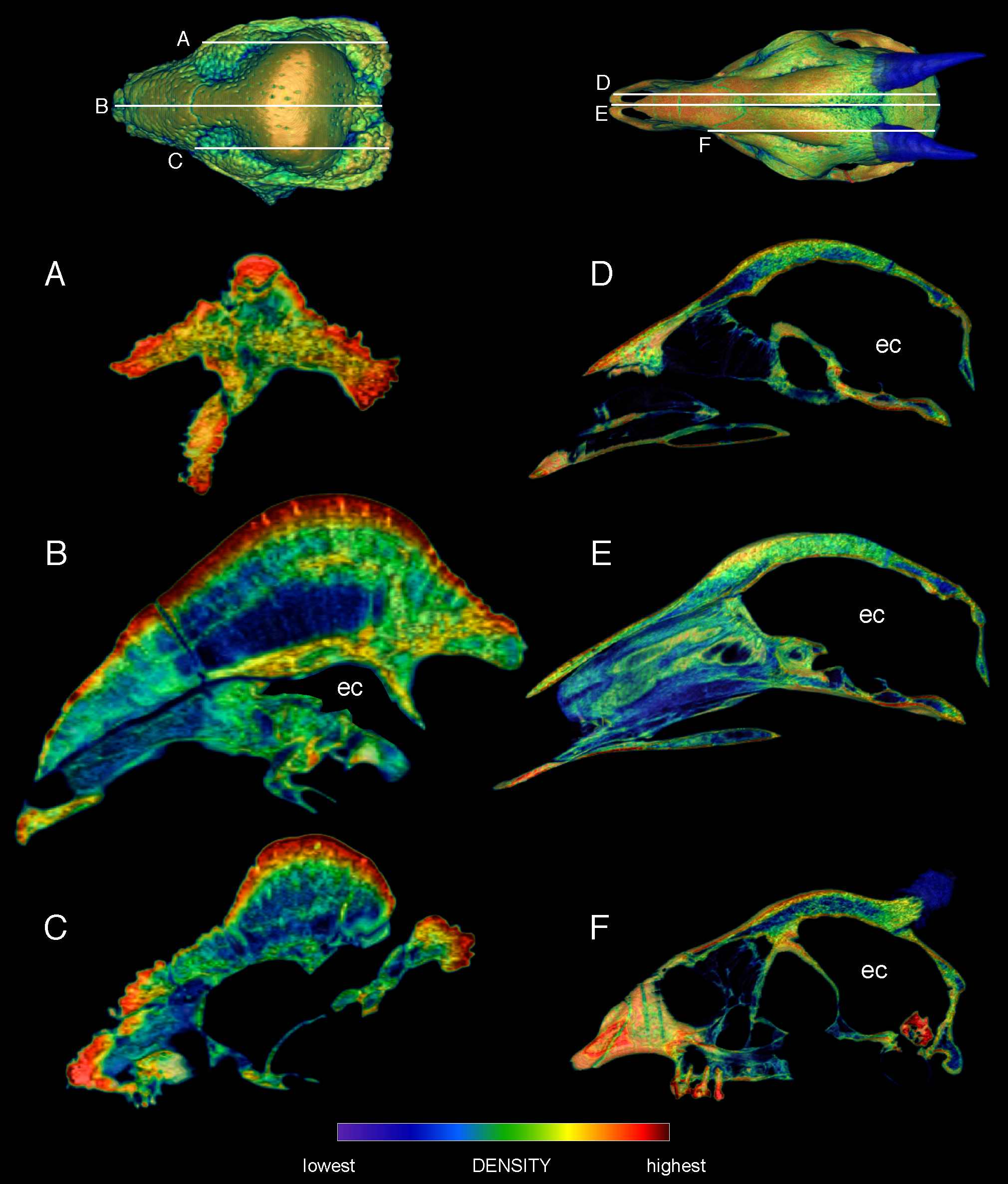
CT cross-sections showing the internal density of bone in UALVP 2 (left, blue: low, red: high), and comparison with sections of the skull of a white-bellied duiker (right)

Because of the problems he found with the head-butting hypothesis, Carpenter instead suggested the domes were adaptations for flank-butting (as seen in some large African mammals); he imagined that two animals would stand parallel, facing each other or the same direction, and direct blows to the side of the opponent. The relatively large body width of pachycephalosaurs may consequently have served to protect vital organs from harm during flank-butting. It is possible that Stegoceras and similar pachycephalosaurs would have delivered the blows with a movement of the neck from the side and a rotation of the head. The upper sides of the dome have the greatest surface area, and may have been the point of impact. The thickness of the dome would have increased the power behind a blow to the sides, and this would ensure that the opponent felt the force of the impact, without being seriously injured. The bone rim above the orbit may have protected the aggressor's eye when making a blow. Carpenter suggested that the pachycephalosaurs would have first engaged in threat display by bobbing and presenting their heads to show the size of their domes (intimidation), and thereafter delivered blows to each other, until one opponent signalled submission.

In 2008, Eric Snively and Adam Cox tested the performance of 2D and 3D pachycephalosaur skulls through finite element analysis, and found that they could withstand considerable impact; greater vaulting of the domes allowed for higher forces of impact. They also considered it likely that pachycephalosaur domes were covered in keratin, a strong material that can withstand much energy without being permanently damaged (like the osteoderms of crocodilians), and therefore incorporated keratin into their test formula. In 2011, Snively and Jessica M. Theodor conducted a finite element analysis by simulating head-impacts with CT scanned skulls of S. validum (UALVP 2), Prenocephale prenes and several extant head-butting artiodactyls. They found that the correlations between head-striking and skull morphologies found in the living animals also existed in the studied pachycephalosaurs. Stegoceras and Prenocephale both had skull shapes similar to the bighorn sheep with cancellous bone protecting the brain. They also shared similarities in the distribution of compact and cancellous regions with the bighorn sheep, white-bellied duiker and the giraffe. The white-bellied duiker was found to be the closest morphological analogue to Stegoceras; this head-butting species has a dome which is smaller but similarly rounded. Stegoceras was better capable of dissipating force than artiodactyls that butt heads at high forces, but the less vascularized domes of older pachycephalosaurs, and possibly diminished ability to heal from injuries, argued against such combat in older individuals. The study also tested the effects of a keratinous covering of the dome, and found it to aid in performance. Though Stegoceras lacked the pneumatic sinuses that are found below the point of impact in the skulls of head-striking artiodactyls, it instead had vascular struts which could have similarly acted as braces, as well as conduits to feed the development of a keratin covering.

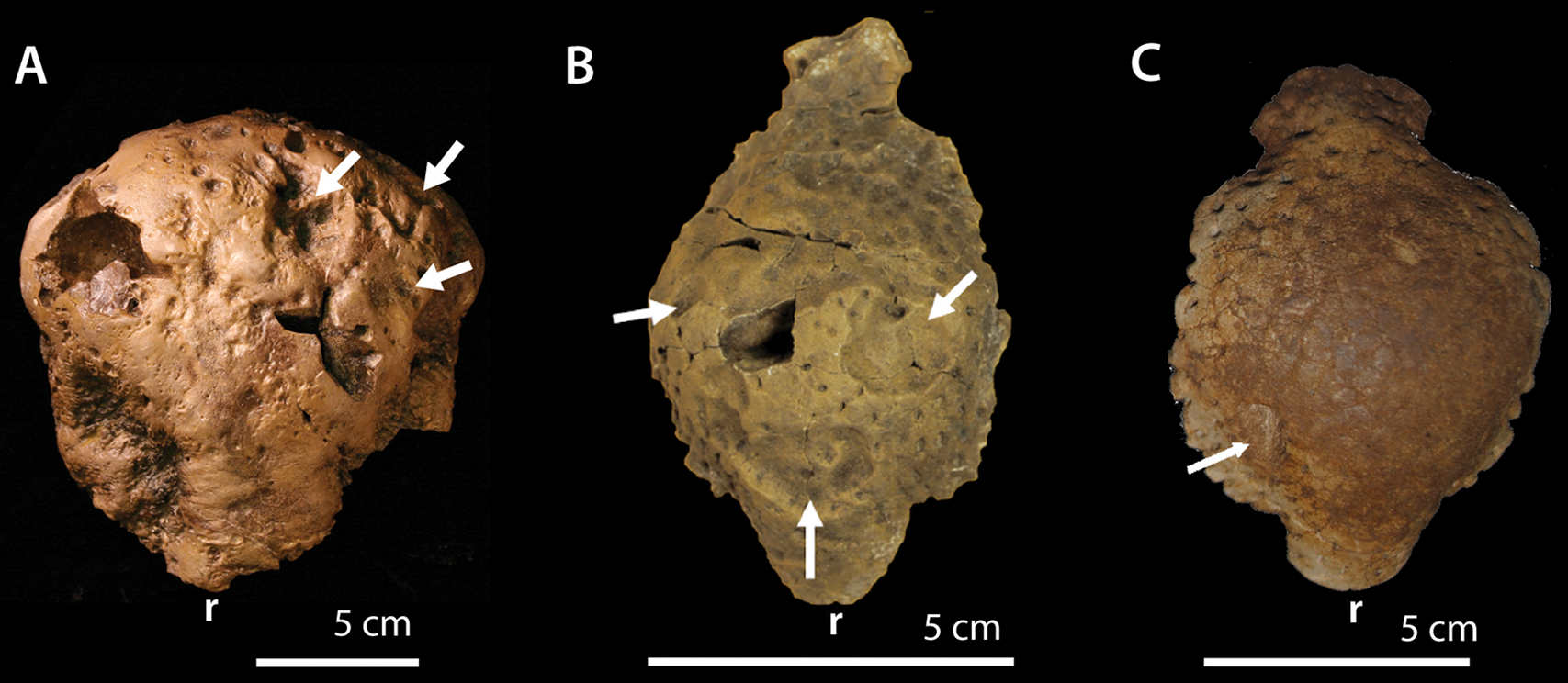
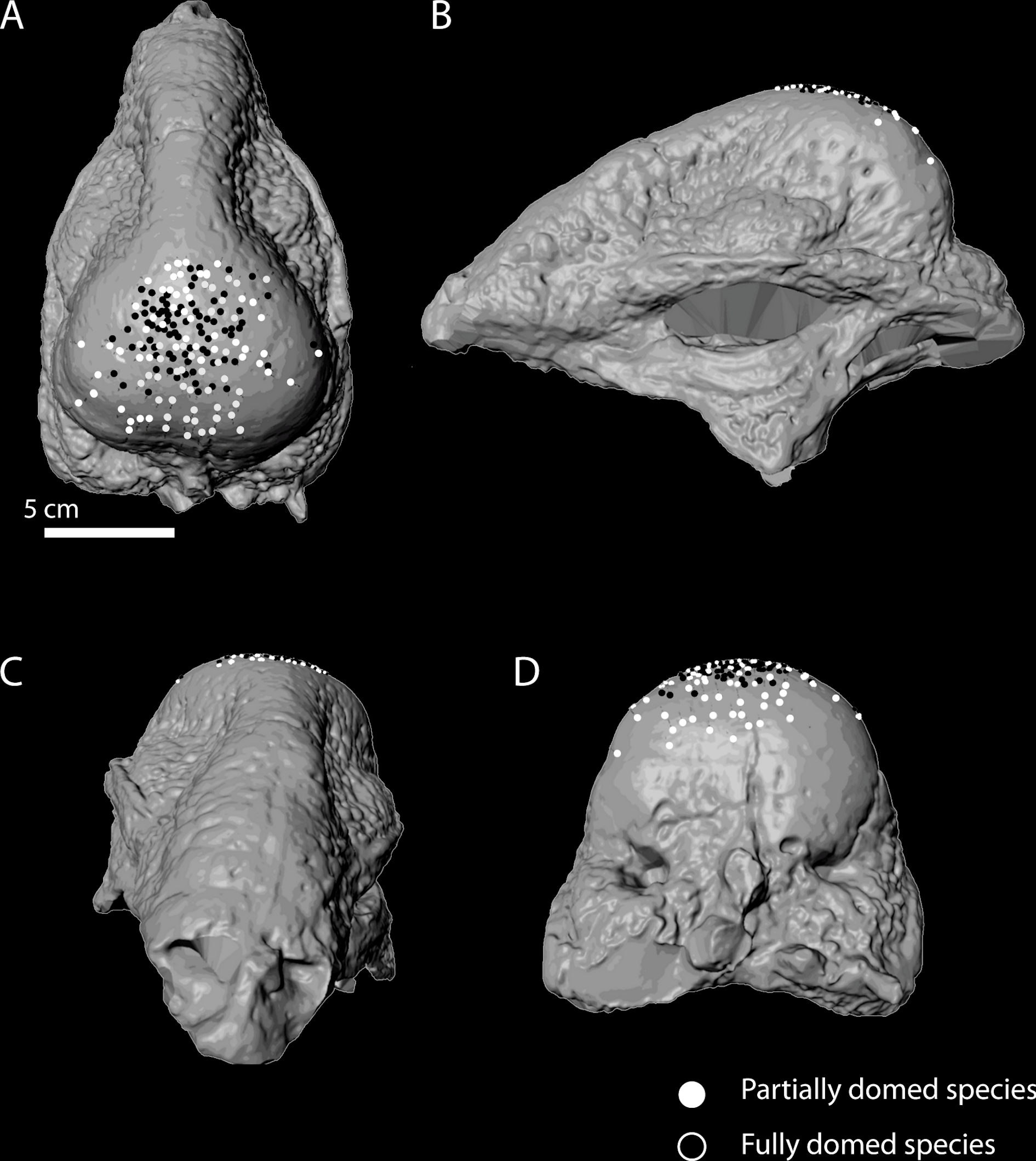
S. validum domes with lesions (arrows, left) shown from above, and distribution of observed pachycephalosaurid skull lesions shown on a S. validum skull model (right)

In 2012, Caleb M. Brown and Anthony P. Russell suggested that the stiffened tails were probably not used as defence against flank-butting, but may have enabled the animals to take a tripodal stance during intra-specific combat, with the tail as support. Brown and Russell found that the tail could thereby help in resisting compressive, tensile, and torsional loading when the animal delivered or received blows with the dome. A 2013 study by Joseph E. Peterson and colleagues identified lesions in skulls of Stegoceras and other pachycephalosaurs, which were interpreted as infections caused by trauma. Lesions were found on 22% of sampled pachycephalosaur skulls (a frequency consistent across genera), but were absent from flat-headed specimens (which have been interpreted as juveniles or females), which is consistent with use in intra-specific combat (for territory or mates). The distribution of lesions in these animals tended to concentrate at the top of the dome, which supports head-butting behaviour. Flank-butting would probably result in fewer injuries, which would instead be concentrated on the sides of the dome. These observations were made while comparing the lesions with those on the skulls and flanks of modern sheep skeletons. The researchers noted that modern head-butting animals use their weapons for both combat and display, and that pachycephalosaurs could therefore also have used their domes for both. Displaying a weapon and willingness to use it can be enough to settle disputes in some animals.

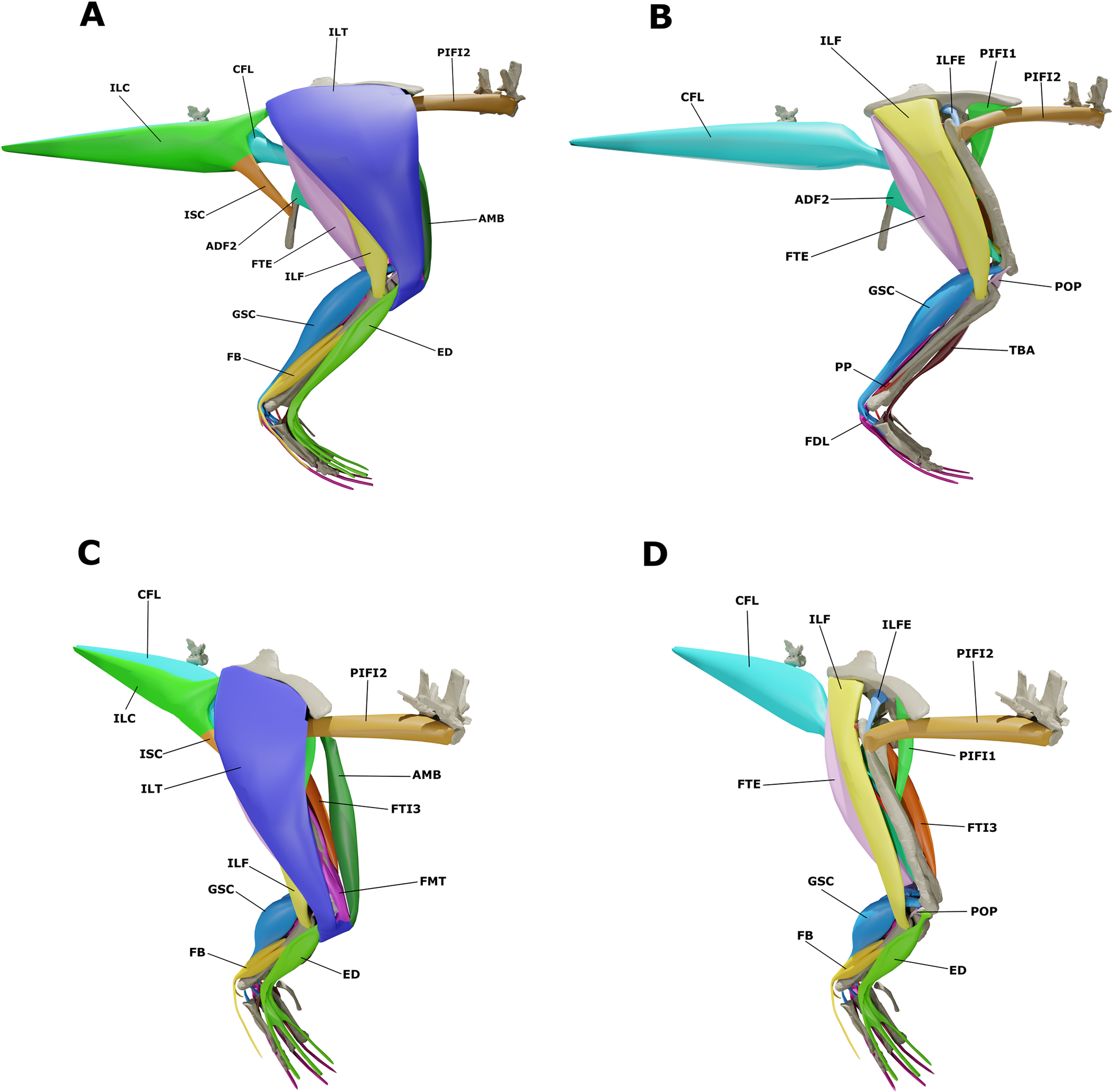
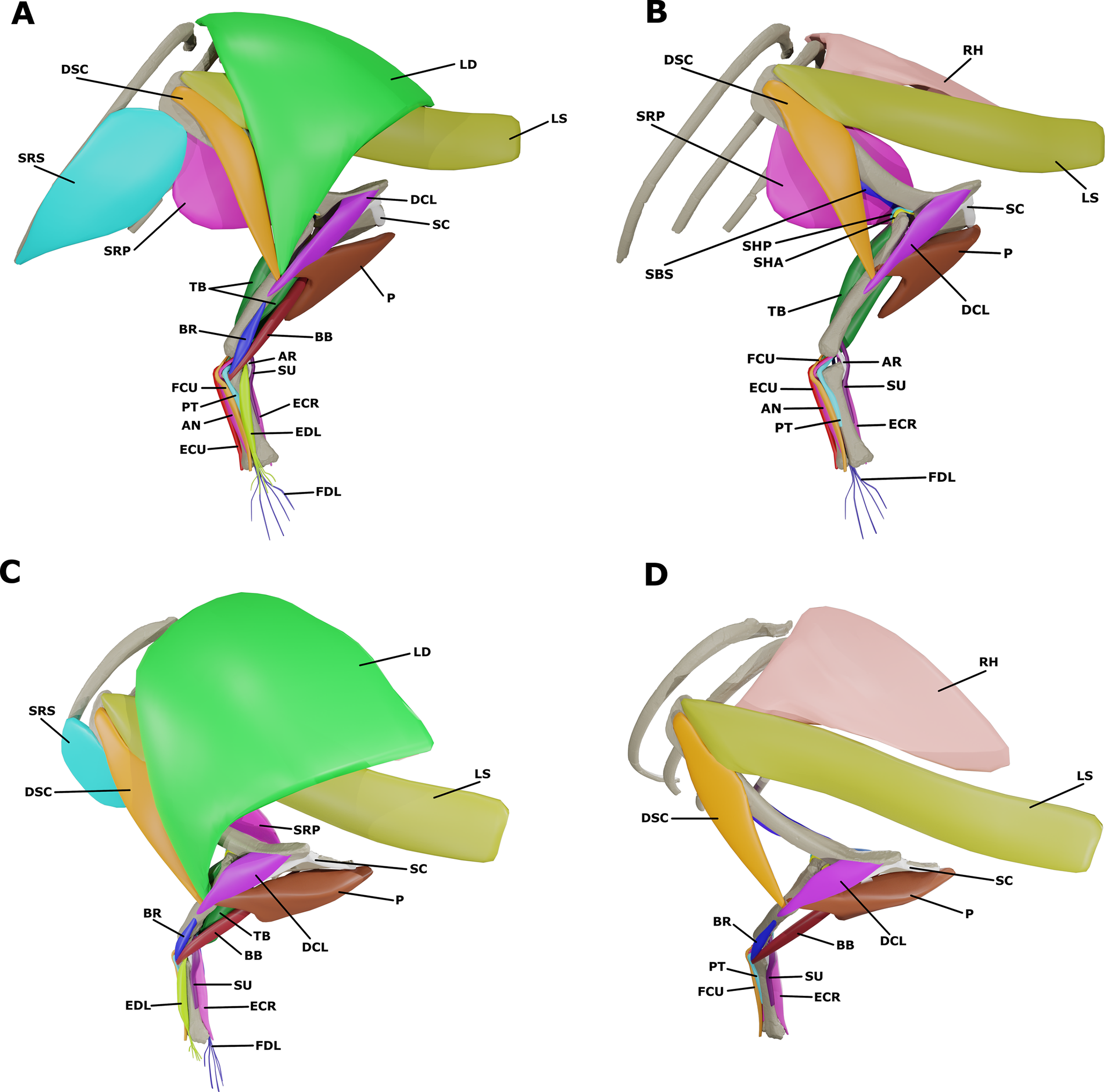
Pelvic, hind limb, pectoral, and brachial musculature reconstructions of S. validum

Bryan R. S. Moore and colleagues examined and reconstructed the limb musculature of Stegoceras in 3D in 2022, using the very complete UALVP 2 specimen as basis. They found that the musculature of the forelimbs was conservative, particularly compared to those of early bipedal saurischian dinosaurs, but the pelvic and hindlimb musculature was instead more derived, due to peculiarities of the skeleton. These areas had large muscles, and combined with the wide pelvis and stout hind limbs (and possibly enlarged ligaments), this resulted in a strong, stable pelvic structure that would have helped during head-butting between individuals. Since the skull domes of pachycephalosaurs grew with positive allometry, and may have been used in combat, these researchers suggested it may have been the case for the hindlimb muscles as well, if they were used to propel the body forwards during head-butting. They cautioned that while UALVP 2 is very complete for a pachycephalosaur, their study was limited by it missing large portions of its vertebral column and outer limb elements.

==== Other suggested functions ====
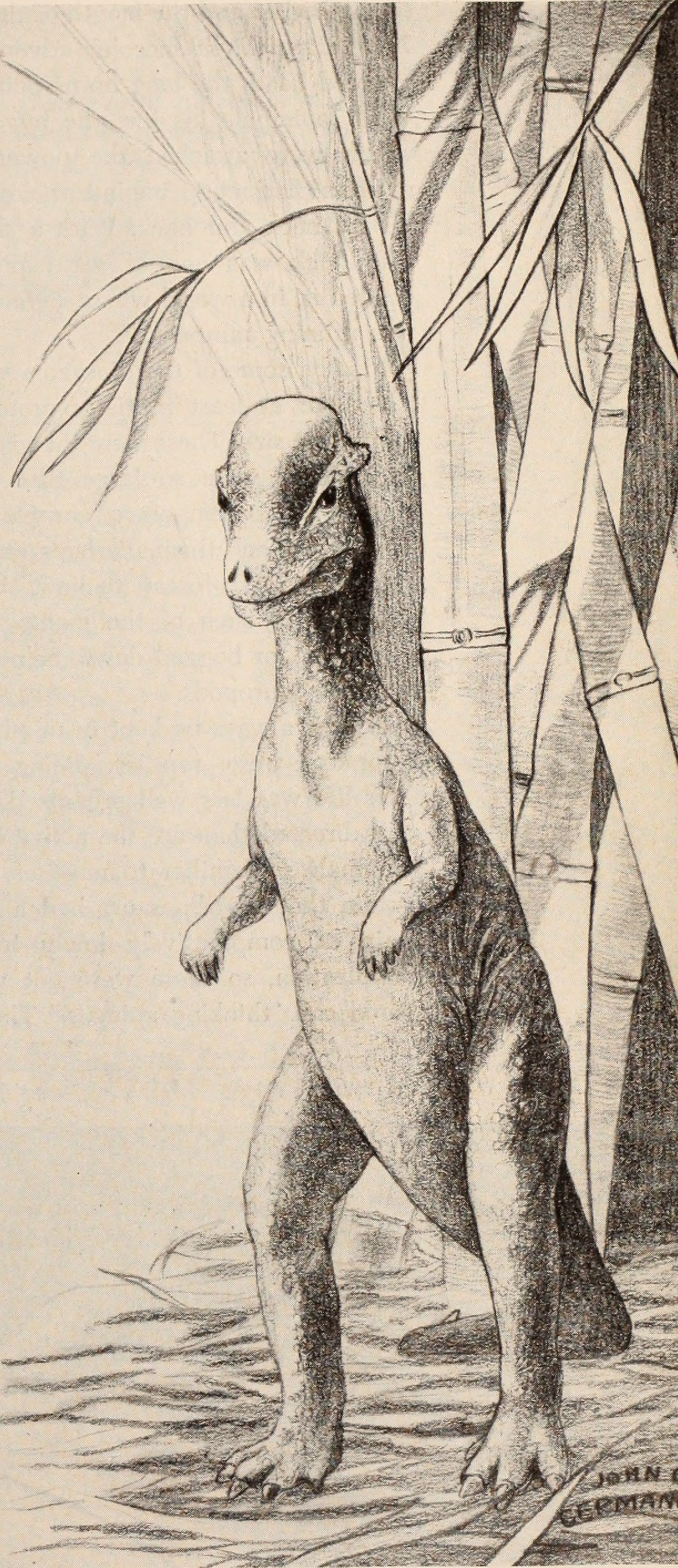
Outdated 1945 restoration showing tripodal stance some researchers have suggested was used during combat

In 1987, J. Keith Rigby and colleagues suggested that pachycephalosaur domes were heat-exchange organs used for thermoregulation, based on their internal "radiating structures" (trabeculae). This idea was supported by a few other writers in the mid-1990s. In 1998, Goodwin and colleagues considered the lack of sinuses in the skull of Stegoceras and the "honeycomb"-like network of vascular bone in the dome ill-suited for head-butting, and pointed out that the bones adjacent to the dome risked fracture during such contact. Building on the idea that the ossified tendons that stiffened the tails of Stegoceras and other pachycephalosaurs enabled them to take a tripodal stance (earlier suggested by Maryańska and Osmólska in 1974), Goodwin and colleagues suggested these structures could have protected the tail against flank-butting, or that the tail itself could have been used as a weapon. In 2004, Goodwin and colleagues studied the cranial histology of pachycephalosaurs, and found that the vascularity (including the trabeculae) of the domes decreased with age, which they found inconsistent with a function in either head-butting or heat-exchange. They also suggested that a dense layer of Sharpey's fibers near the surface of the dome indicated that it had an external covering in life, which makes it impossible to know the shape of the dome in a living animal. These researchers instead concluded that the domes were mainly for species recognition and communication (as in some African bovids) and that use in sexual display was only secondary. They further speculated that the external covering of the domes was brightly coloured in life, or may have changed colour seasonally.

In 2011, palaeontologists Kevin Padian and John R. Horner proposed that "bizarre structures" in dinosaurs in general (including domes, frills, horns, and crests) were primarily used for species recognition, and dismissed other explanations as unsupported by evidence. Among other studies, these authors cited Goodwin and colleague's 2004 paper on pachycephalosaur domes as support of this idea, and they pointed out that such structures did not appear to be sexually dimorphic. In a response to Padian and Horner the same year, Rob J. Knell and Scott D. Sampson argued that species recognition was not unlikely as a secondary function for "bizarre structures" in dinosaurs, but that sexual selection (used in display or combat to compete for mates) was a more likely explanation, due to the high cost of developing them, and because such structures appear to be highly variable within species. In 2013, the British palaeontologists David E. Hone and Darren Naish criticized the "species recognition hypothesis", and argued that no extant animals use such structures primarily for species recognition, and that Padian and Horner had ignored the possibility of mutual sexual selection (where both sexes are ornamented).

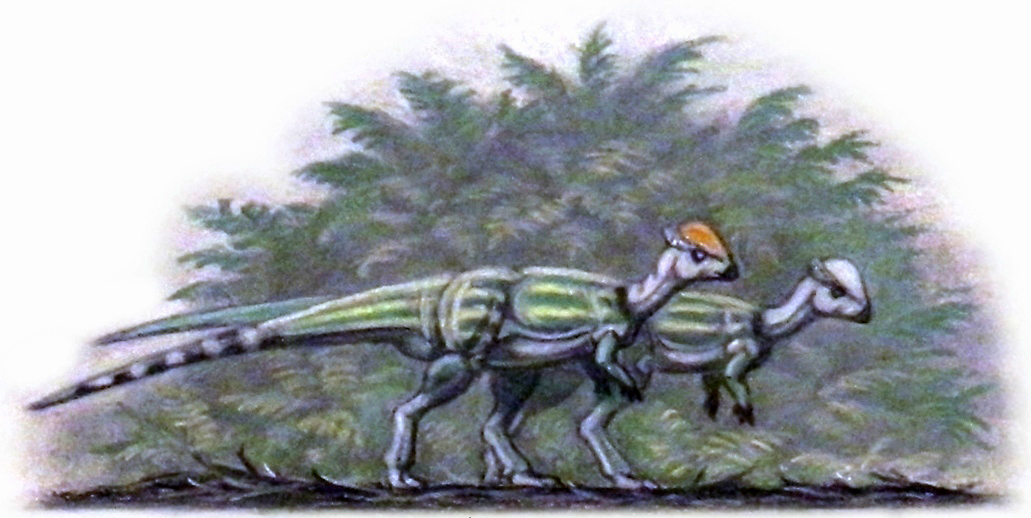
Restoration of a pair with differently coloured domes

In 2012, Schott and Evans suggested that the regularity in squamosal ornamentation throughout the ontogeny of Stegoceras was consistent with species recognition, but the change from flat to domed frontoparietals in late age suggests that the function of this feature changed through ontogeny, and was perhaps sexually selected, possibly for intra-specific combat. Dyer and colleagues found in 2023 that Stegoceras specimens differed in the thickness of the frontonasal boss, and that skulls with the most bone pathologies were those with the tallest bosses, which they considered indication that variation in boss thickness represents intersexual variation. In 2023, Horner and colleagues stated that since the dome and associated ornamentation of Stegoceras and the ornamentation of Pachycephalosaurus developed early in life, this indicates they were used for visual communication, so that juveniles could recognise other juveniles and adults other adults. They did not rule out that these features could have been used for other purposes, including head-butting, but did not consider trauma seen in specimens as evidence for this. They also suggested that features in some pachycephalosaurid skulls indicate the dome would have supported a greater, keratinous structure than just a cap.

== Palaeoenvironment ==
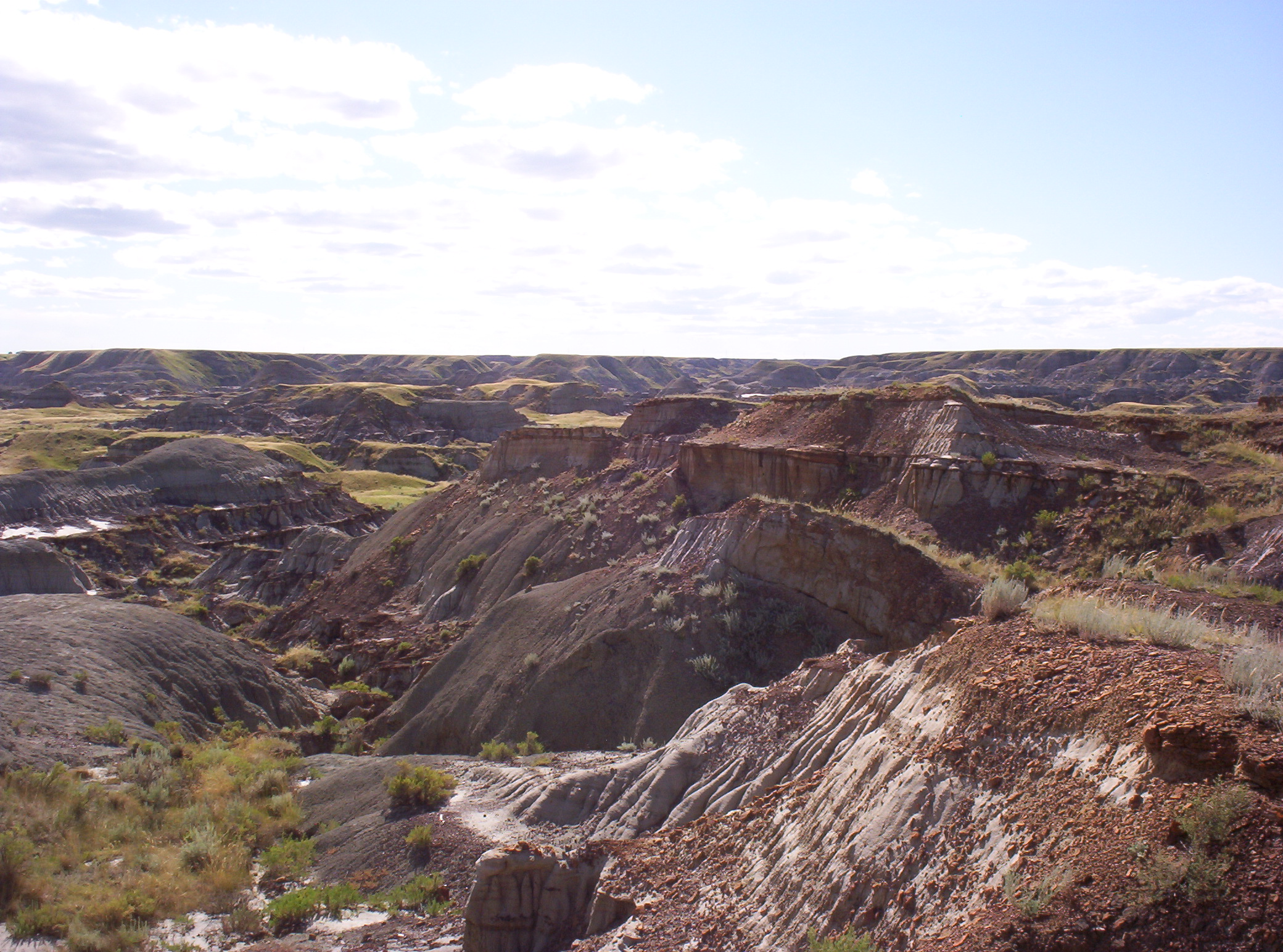
The Dinosaur Park Formation in Alberta, Canada, where S. validum was first discovered

S. validum is known from the late Late Cretaceous Belly River Group (the Canadian equivalent to the Judith River Group in the US), and specimens have been recovered from the Dinosaur Park Formation (late Campanian, 76.5 to 75 mya) in Dinosaur Provincial Park (including the lectotype specimen), and the Oldman Formation (middle Campanian, 77.5 to 76.5 mya) of Alberta, Canada. The pachycephalosaur Foraminacephale is also known from both formations. S. novomexicanum is known from the Fruitland (late Campanian, about 75 mya) and lower Kirtland Formation (late Campanian, about 74 mya) of New Mexico, and if this species correctly belongs in Stegoceras, the genus would have had a broad geographic distribution. The presence of similar pachycephalosaurs in both the west and north of North America during the latest Cretaceous shows that they were an important part of the dinosaur faunas there.

It has traditionally been suggested that pachycehalosaurs inhabited mountain environments; wear of their skulls was supposedly a result of them having been rolled by water from upland areas, and comparisons with bighorn sheep reinforced the theory. In 2014, Jordan C. Mallon and Evans disputed this idea, as the wear and original locations of the skulls is not consistent with having been transported in such a way, and they instead proposed that North American pachycephalosaurs inhabited alluvial (associated with water) and coastal plain environments.

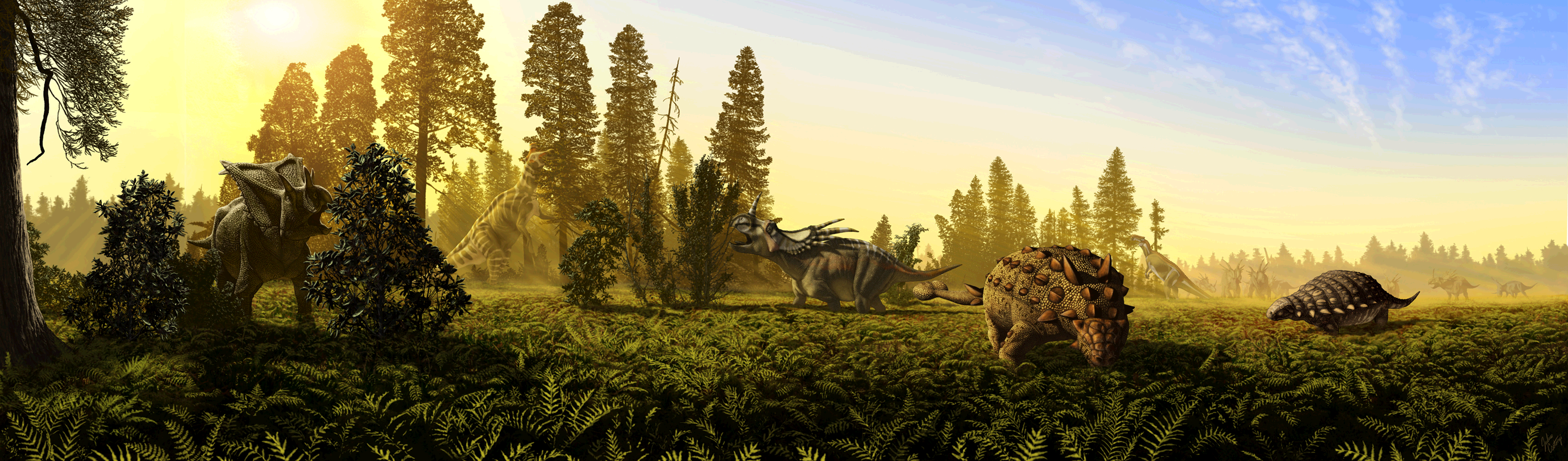
Restoration showing some of the mega-herbivores from the Dinosaur Park Formation that lived alongside S. validum

The Dinosaur Park Formation is interpreted as a low-relief setting of rivers and floodplains that became more swampy and influenced by marine conditions over time as the Western Interior Seaway transgressed westward. The climate was warmer than present-day Alberta, without frost, but with wetter and drier seasons. Conifers were apparently the dominant canopy plants, with an understory of ferns, tree ferns, and angiosperms. Dinosaur Park is known for its diverse community of herbivores. As well as Stegoceras, the formation has also yielded fossils of the ceratopsians Centrosaurus, Styracosaurus and Chasmosaurus, the hadrosaurids Prosaurolophus, Lambeosaurus, Gryposaurus, Corythosaurus, and Parasaurolophus, and the ankylosaurs Edmontonia and Euoplocephalus. Theropods present include the tyrannosaurids Gorgosaurus and Daspletosaurus. Other dinosaurs known from the Oldman Formation include the hadrosaur Brachylophosaurus, the ceratopsians Coronosaurus and Albertaceratops, ornithomimids, therizinosaurs and possibly ankylosaurs. Theropods included troodontids, oviraptorosaurs, the dromaeosaurid Saurornitholestes and possibly an albertosaurine tyrannosaur.

== See also ==
- Timeline of pachycephalosaur research
