= Brontotholus =

Brontotholus Temporal range: Late Cretaceous (late Campanian), ~75.5–75.3 Ma

Scientific classification
- Kingdom: Animalia
- Phylum: Chordata
- Class: Reptilia
- Clade: Dinosauria
- Clade: †Ornithischia
- Clade: †Pachycephalosauria
- Family: †Pachycephalosauridae
- Genus: †Brontotholus; Woodruff et al., 2025
- Species: †B. harmoni

Binomial name
- †Brontotholus harmoni Woodruff et al., 2025

Genus of pachycephalosaurid dinosaurs

Brontotholus (lit. 'thunder dome') is an extinct genus of pachycephalosaurid dinosaur known from the Late Cretaceous (Campanian stage) Two Medicine and Oldman formations of Montana, United States, and Alberta, Canada, respectively. The genus contains a single species, Brontotholus harmoni, known from multiple partial domes.

== Discovery and naming ==
The Brontotholus holotype specimen, MOR 480, was discovered in 1987 by Bob Makela from the Two Medicine Formation in Montana, United States. It was first mentioned as one of the transitional pachycephalosaurid specimens that are intermediate between Stegoceras and Pachycephalosaurus by Horner, Varricchio and Goodwin in 1992, then uncatalogued, and was subsequently assigned to cf. Hanssuesia sternbergi along with MOR 453 by Sullivan in 2003 prior to its 2025 redescription. The five known fossils of the Brontotholus material consist of frontoparietal domes, all discovered from the Two Medicine Formation except TMP 1989.69.21 found in 1989 by Wendy Sloboda from the Oldman Formation in Alberta, Canada.

In 2025, Woodruff and colleagues described Brontotholus harmoni as a new genus and species of pachycephalosaurs based on these fossil remains. The generic name, Brontotholus, is a combination of Ancient Greek words βροντή (brontē, "thunder") and θόλος (tholos, "dome") based on the 1985 film Mad Max Beyond Thunderdome and the locality name "Beyond Thunder Dome" where the paratype was discovered. The specific epithet, harmoni, is named in honour of the late Robert 'Bob' Harmon, a former fossil preparator at the Museum of the Rockies. Only two specimens (the holotype MOR 480 and the paratype MOR 479) are definitively referred to B. harmoni, while the other three specimens (MOR 453, MOR 550 and TMP 1989.69.21) are tentatively referred to the genus as B. sp.

== Description ==
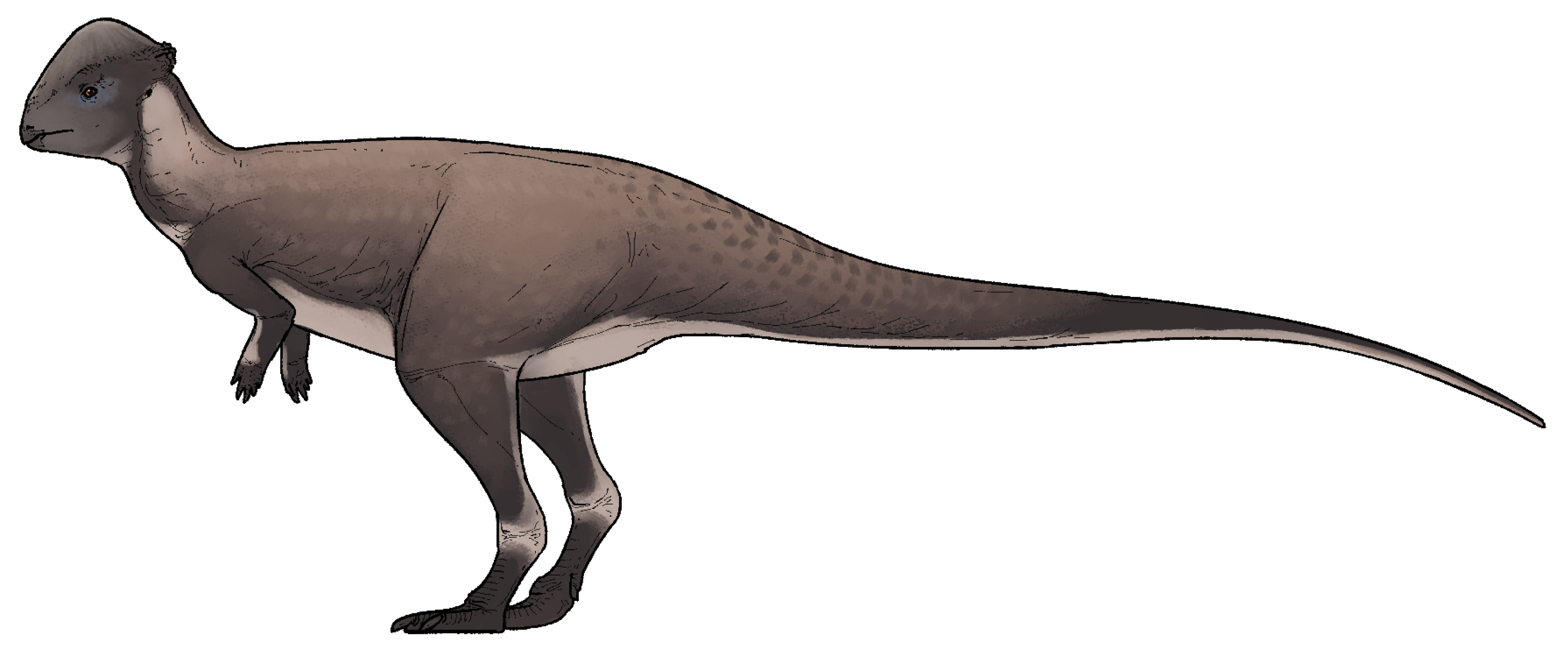
Speculative life restoration

The holotype of Brontotholus is estimated to have reached a body length of 3.8 metres (12 ft), making it the third largest North American pachycephalosaurid after Pachycephalosaurus and Platytholus. MOR 453 is the largest specimen referred to the genus Brontotholus, identified as a late subadult based on osteohistological analysis. Woodruff and colleagues relied on morphological comparison to assume that the holotype reached a similar ontogenetic stage, as they were unable to obtain high-resolution CT scans or perform osteohistological analyses based on known fossil material.

== Classification ==
Woodruff et al. (2025) recovered Brontotholus as a sister taxon of Foraminacephale within the Pachycephalosauridae polytomy. The results of the strict consensus phylogenetic analysis based on extended implied weighting is displayed in the cladogram below:

- Pachycephalosauridae
  - - Stegoceras validum
    - Stegoceras novomexicanum
  - - - Hanssuesia sternbergi
      - Colepiocephale lambei
    - Foraminacephale brevis
    - Brontotholus harmoni
  - Tylocephale gilmorei
  - Amtocephale gobiensis
  - Prenocephale prenes
  - - Goyocephale lattimorei
    - Homalocephale calathocercos
  - Platytholus clemensi
  - Acrotholus audeti
  - - Sphaerotholus goodwini
    - - Sphaerotholus buchholtzae
      - Sphaerotholus edmontonensis
    - Alaskacephale gangloffi
    - Sphaerotholus triregnum
    - Sphaerotholus lyonsi
  - Dracorex hogwartsia
  - Stygimoloch spinifer
  - Pachycephalosaurus wyomingensis
