= Timeline of pachycephalosaur research =

Progression of pachycephalosaur research over time

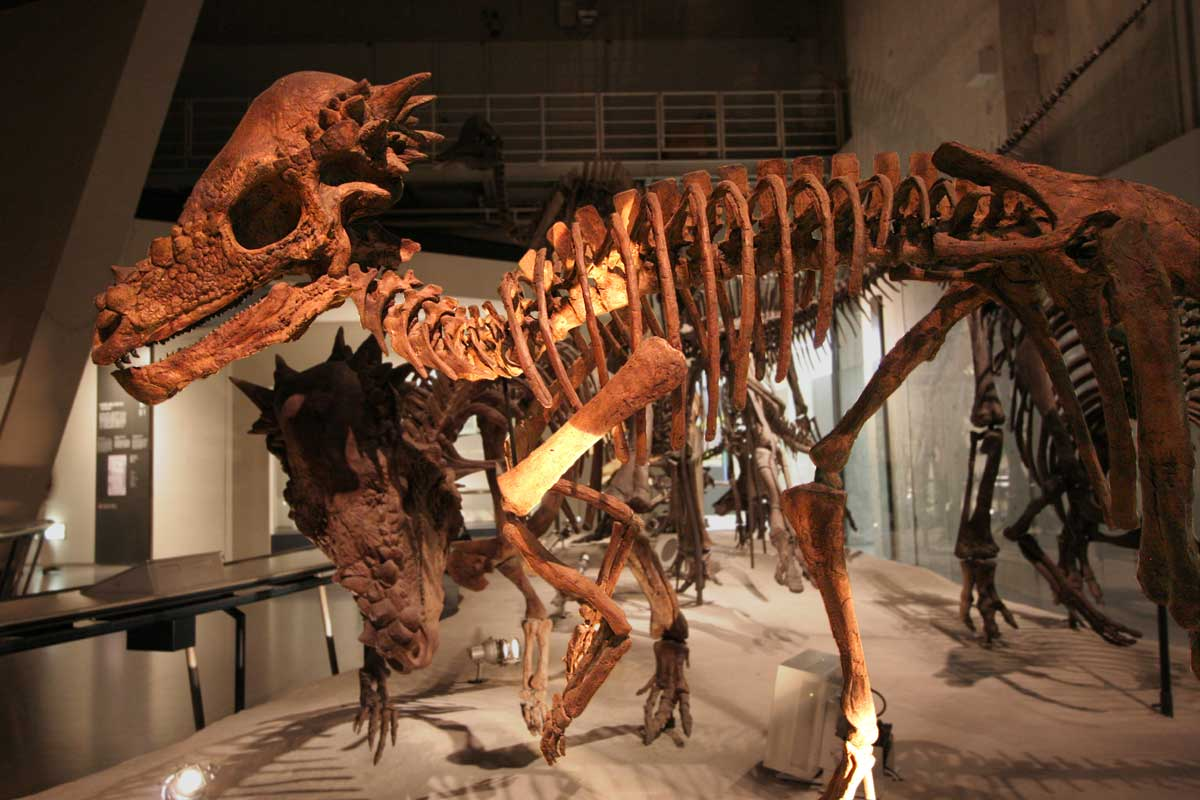
Skeletal mount of Pachycephalosaurus

This timeline of pachycephalosaur research is a chronological listing of events in the history of paleontology focused on the pachycephalosaurs, a group of dome-skulled herbivorous marginocephalian dinosaurs. One of the first major events related to the history of pachycephalosaur research actually regards the discovery of an unrelated dinosaur called Troodon, reported from the western United States by Joseph Leidy in 1856. The type specimen of Troodon was simply an unusual tooth, but the close resemblance between Troodon teeth and pachycephalosaur teeth would cause taxonomic confusion for over a century. This was resolved by Phil Currie in 1987, who realized that Troodon belonged to a group of bird-like carnivores then known as saurornithoidids, but since renamed Troodontidae after Troodon itself. The first scientifically documented true pachycephalosaur remains were discovered in Early Cretaceous rocks from England and named Stenopelix not long after Troodon was named in America. Other notable early finds include the well-known pachycephalosaur Stegoceras validum.

In 1924, Charles Whitney Gilmore named the family Troodontidae after Troodon, but most of its members would be recognizable today as pachycephalosaurs. Seven years later, Gilmore named the new species "Troodon" wyomingensis which would be formally reclassified as Pachycephalosaurus in 1943. Pachycephalosaurus was so unusual that Sternberg named a new family for it, the Pachycephalosauridae. From the time paleontologists identified the pachycephalosaurs as a distinct group of dinosaurs, the chief mystery surrounding their biology has been the function of their distinctive cranial domes. Edwin Colbert interpreted the structure as a biological battering ram in 1955, but never specified who or what may have been on its receiving end. The idea that it was used in head butting between members of the same pachycephalosaur species was first proposed by science fiction writer Sprague de Camp. From then it became a staple of both scientific and cultural reconstructions of these animals.

Nevertheless, this perennial hypothesis would come to be criticized by researchers like Hans-Dieter Sues as less likely than "flank butting" where pachycephalosaurs' domed heads would be aimed at rivals' bodies rather than in head-to-head combat. Others, like Goodwin and others have thought the dome purely for display because its high density of internal blood vasculature may have rendered it too fragile for combat. Meanwhile, in 1998 Chapman and others found the biomechanics of pachycephalosaur domes consistent with the old head-butting hypothesis, suggesting that the idea retains scientific merit.

== 19th century ==
=== 1857 ===
- Christian Erich Hermann von Meyer described the new genus and species Stenopelix valdensis.

=== 1872 ===
- Joseph Leidy described the new genus and species Tylosteus ornatus.

== 20th century ==
=== 1900s ===
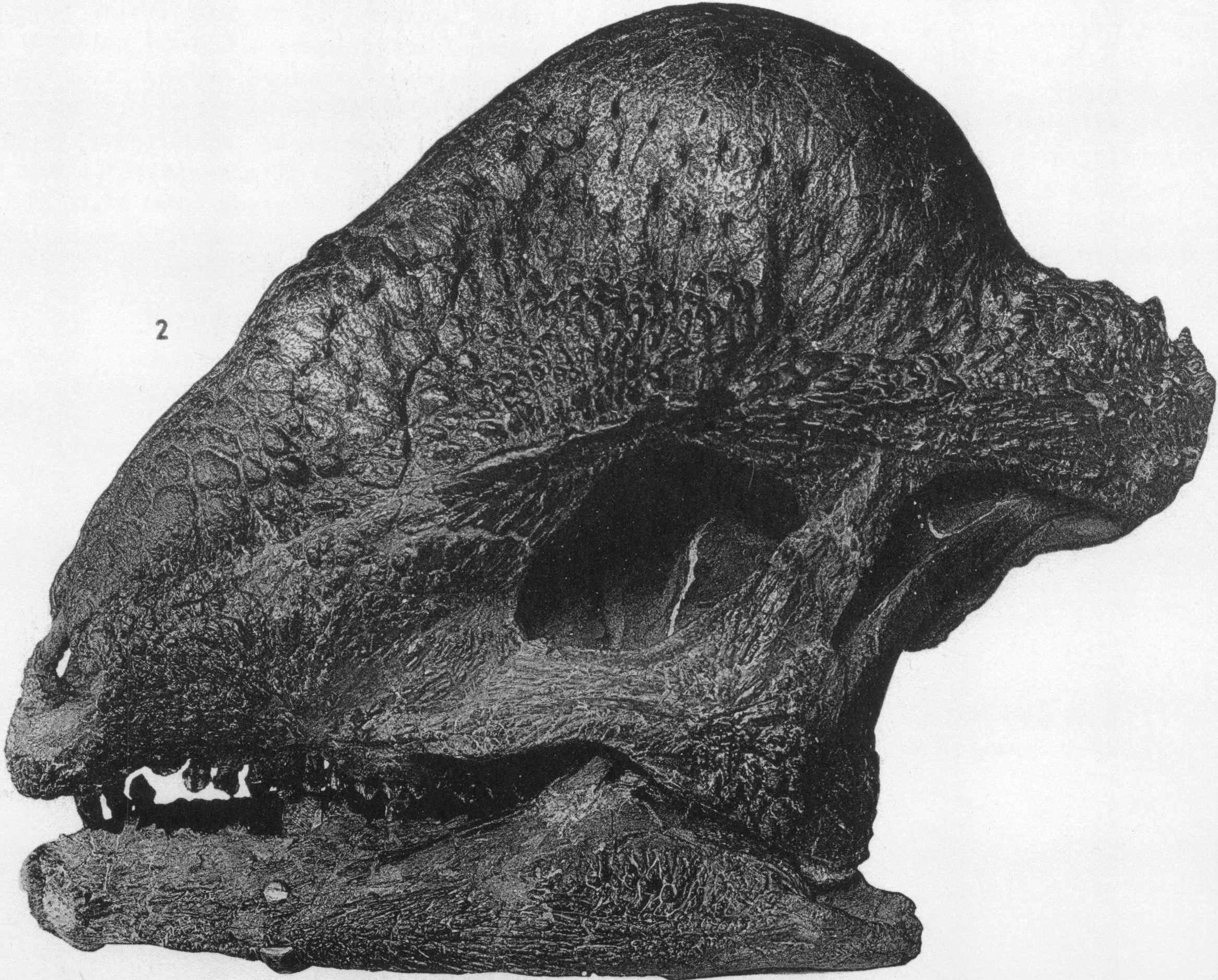
Skull of Stegoceras validum

==== 1902 ====
- Lawrence Lambe described the new genus and species Stegoceras validum.

=== 1910s ===
==== 1918 ====
- Lawrence Lambe described the new species S. brevis.

=== 1920s ===
==== 1924 ====
- Charles Whitney Gilmore named the Troodontidae. At the time the name mainly applied to taxa now considered to be pachycephalosaurs because the groups have vaguely similar teeth.

=== 1930s ===
==== 1931 ====
- Gilmore described the new species Troodon wyomingensis.

=== 1940s ===
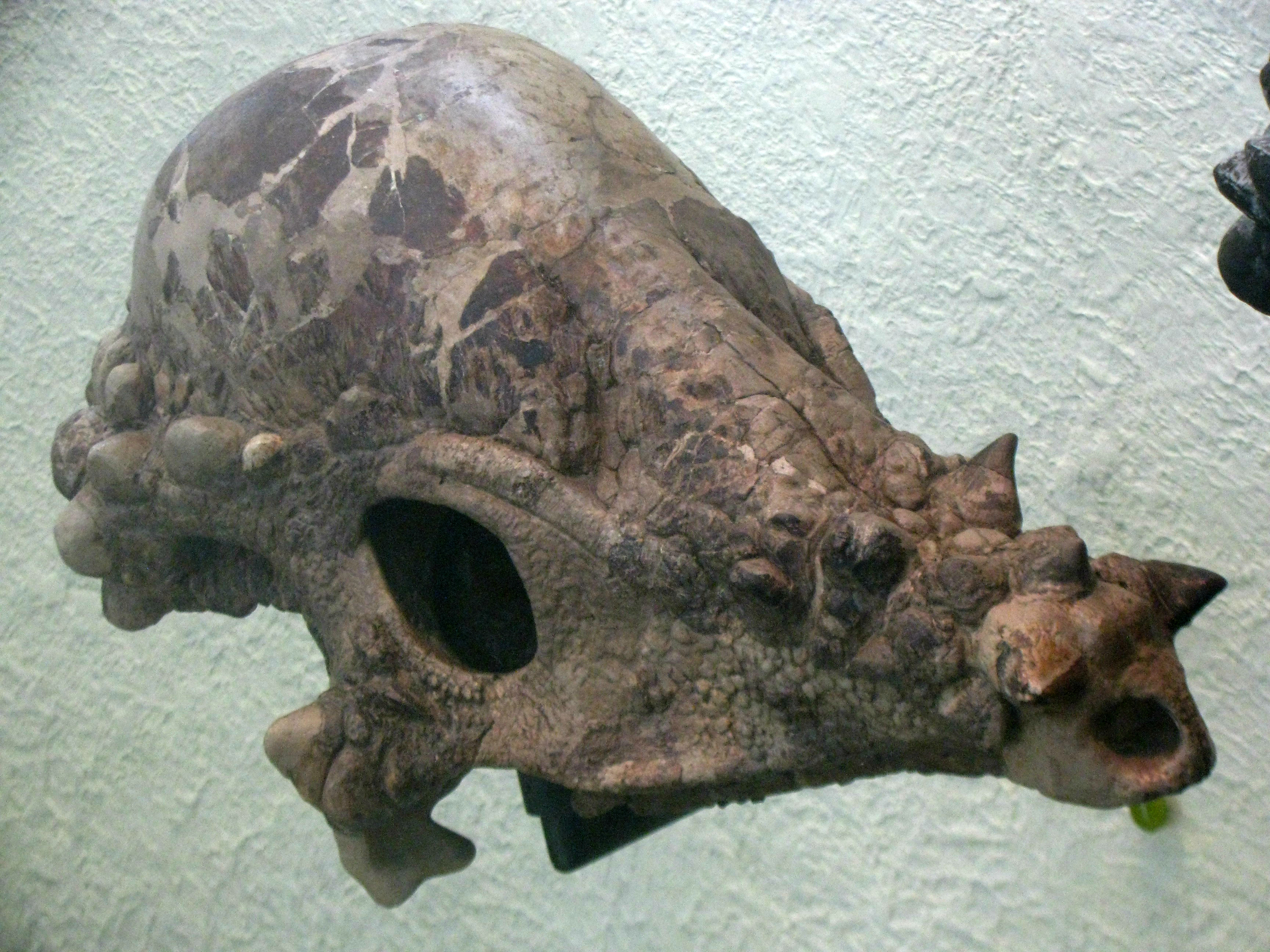
A Pachycephalosaurus skull

==== 1943 ====
- Barnum Brown and Erich Maren Schlaikjer described the new genus and species Pachycephalosaurus wyomingensis. He also named the species P. grangeri and P. reinhemeri. Additionally, they described the species Troodon sternbergi and Troodon edmontonensis. They also observed potential sexual dimorphism in Stegoceras validum. They noticed that there were two kinds of domes in the species. One variant was rougher and had a prominent "shelf" around it. The other was smoother and lacked the shelf. The researchers presumed that this more ornate morph was the male.

==== 1945 ====
- Sternberg named the Pachycephalosauridae. He also named the species Stegoceras lambei.

=== 1950s ===
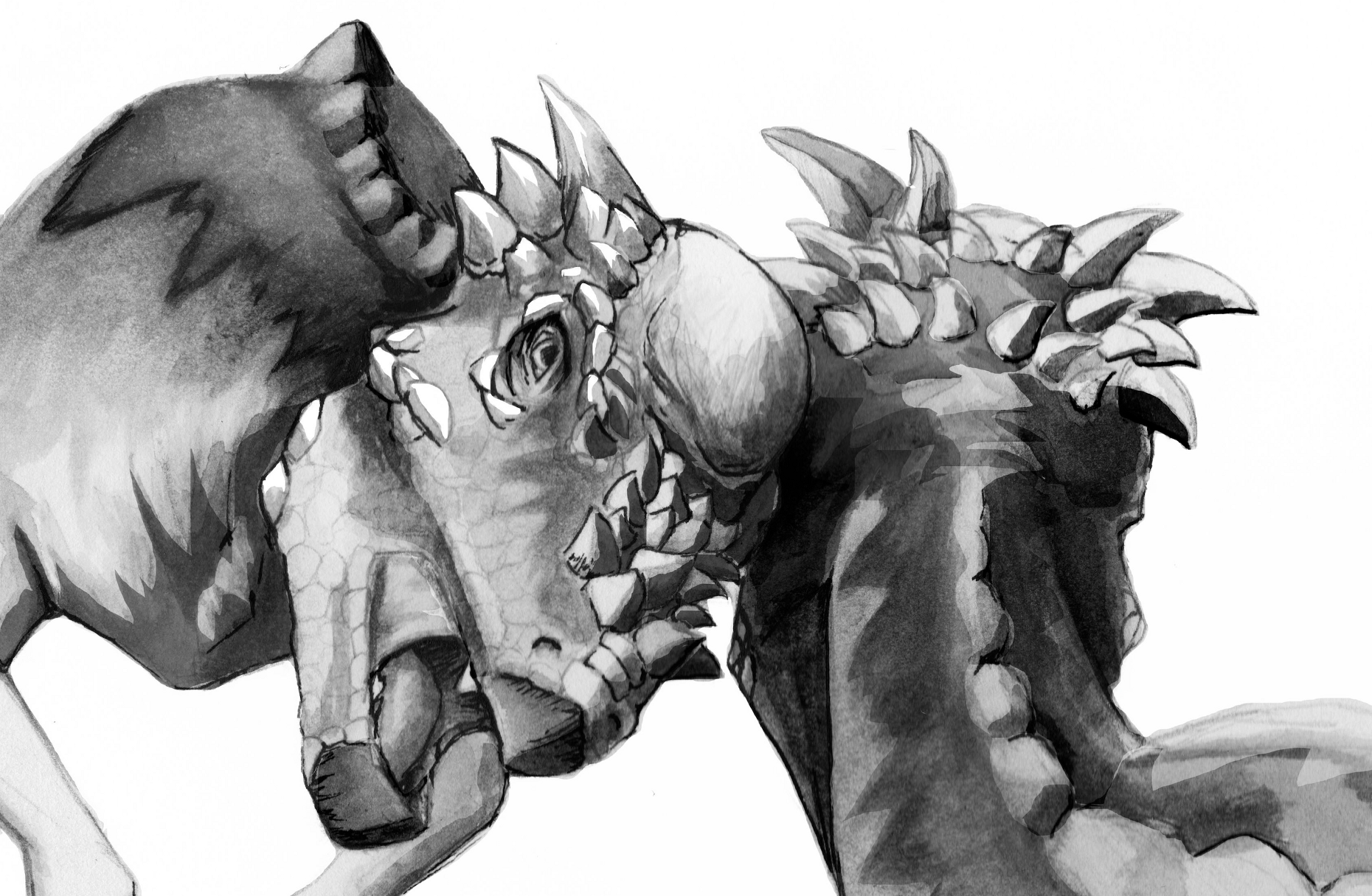
Artist's restoration of head-butting Pachycephalosaurus

==== 1953 ====
- Birger Bohlin described the new species Troodon bexelli.

==== 1955 ====
- Edwin Colbert first suggested that the domed heads of pachycephalosaurs were used as "battering ram[s]".

==== 1956 ====
- Science fiction author Sprague de Camp was the first to specifically suggest that pachycephalosaurs used their domed heads to butt heads with other pachycephalosaurs.

=== 1961 ===
==== 1961 ====
- Russian paleontologist Leo Shiovich Davitashvili suggested that pachycephalosaur skull domes were employed in mating displays or "combat" independently of Western science.

==== 1969 ====
- Colbert reiterated his earlier suggestion that pachycephalosaurs used their domed heads as "battering ram[s]".

=== 1970s ===
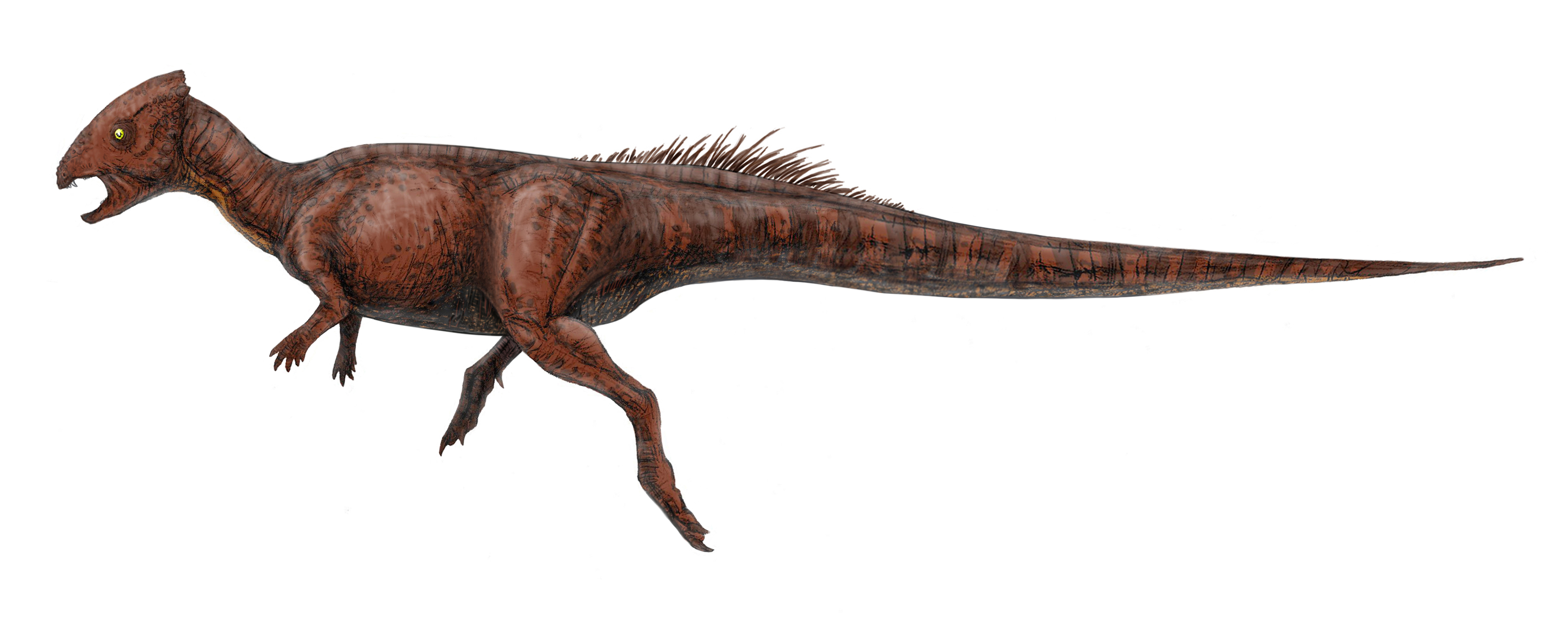
Artist's restoration of Homalocephale calathocercos

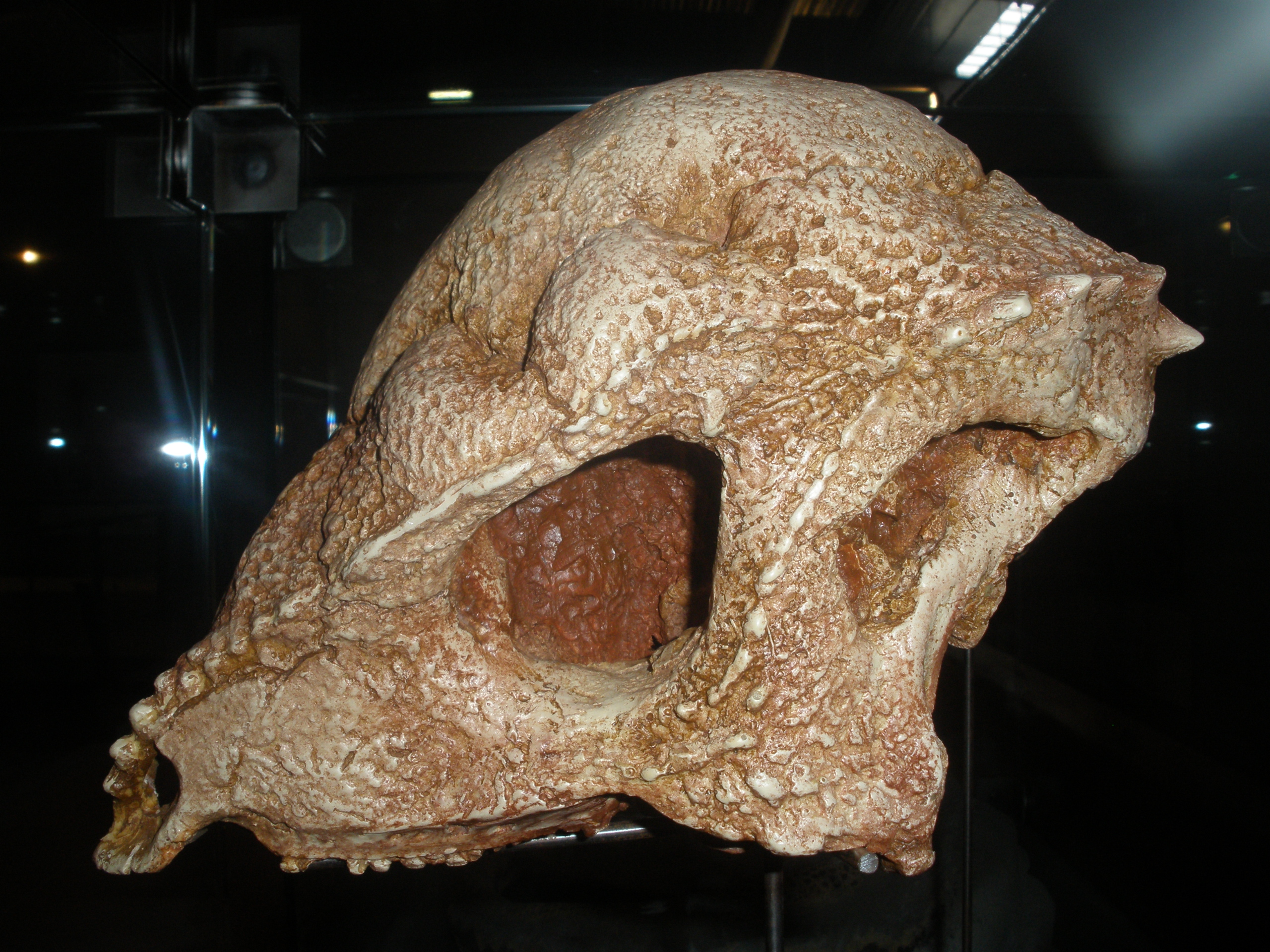
Skull of Prenocephale prenes

==== 1971 ====
- Peter Malcolm Galton began fleshing out the hypothesis that pachycephalosaurs engaged in head-butting. Robert T. Bakker illustrated the hypothesis.
- Galton argued that Brown and Schlaikjer got the genders wrong in their 1943 hypothesis that Stegoceras validum exhibited sexual dimorphism. Under Galton's interpretation, as Stegoceras grew the dome expanded until there was no prominent shelf. The presence of a shelf was therefore more likely to suggest a less developed dome, as might be expected in a female morph. He continued to advocate for the idea that pachycephalosaurs butted heads. He observed that many aspects of pachycephalosaur anatomy seemed adapted to transmitting forces received from a blow to the head through the body.
- Dodson argued that the rarity of pachycephalosaurs in the fossil record suggests that they preferred dryer habitats, farther from coasts and rivers where ceratopsians and ornithopods lived and where fossilization is more likely to occur.

==== 1974 ====
- Teresa Maryańska and Halszka Osmólska named the suborder Pachycephalosauria. Maryańska and Osmólska described the new genus and species Homalocephale calathocercos. They also described the new genus and species Prenocephale prenes. The authors noted that past discussions in the literature about whether or not the presence of a shelf of bone on the skull was a gender difference was relevant to the validity of these new taxa since one had a shelf and the other did not. As these genera came from the same time and place, it was possible that instead of being different taxa, one could be the male and the other the female of a single species. However, Maryańska and Osmólska noted many anatomical differences that supported their status as distinct taxa. They therefore described the new genus and species Tylocephale gilmorei. The researchers observed that teeth of different pachycephalosaur species exhibit different wear patterns. This suggests that there was significant variations of diet between species. They observed that many aspects of pachycephalosaur anatomy seemed adapted to transmitting forces received from a blow to the head through the body.

==== 1977 ====
- Hou Lianhai described the new genus and species Wannanosaurus yansiensis.
- Ralph Molnar "reiterated" the idea that pachycephalosaur domes were used in mating displays or combat.

==== 1978 ====
- Dong Zhiming described the new genus and species Micropachycephalosaurus hongtuyanensis. He also proposed that the flat-headed pachycephalosaurs constituted a distinct family called the Homalocephalidae.

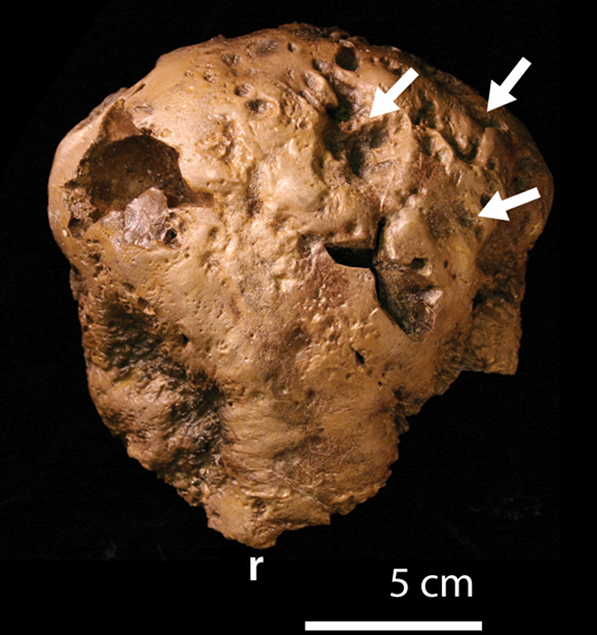
Skull of Gravitholus viewed from above. The arrows point out lesions in the bone.

- Hans-Dieter Sues argued that while pachycephalosaurs probably did use their skull domes as battering rams, they probably did not use them in direct head-to-head contact because the domes lacked a mechanism to prevent the combatants skulls from sliding past each other at odd angles upon impact.
- Sues examined pachycephalosaur head-butting experimentally using photo-elastic plastic models studied under polarized light. His results were consistent with the head-butting hypothesis, but he felt it more likely that pachycephalosaurs would use their domed heads to ram each other's flanks. He observed that many aspects of pachycephalosaur anatomy seemed adapted to transmitting forces received from a blow to the head through the body.

==== 1979 ====
- William Patrick Wall and Galton described the new species Stegoceras browni. This was one of the last research publications to take seriously a hypothetical evolutionary affinity between pachycephalosaurs and ornithopods. Wall and Galton described the new genus and species Gravitholus albertae.
- Sues and Philippe Taquet described Majungatholus atopus as a Gondwanan pachycephalosaur.

=== 1980s ===
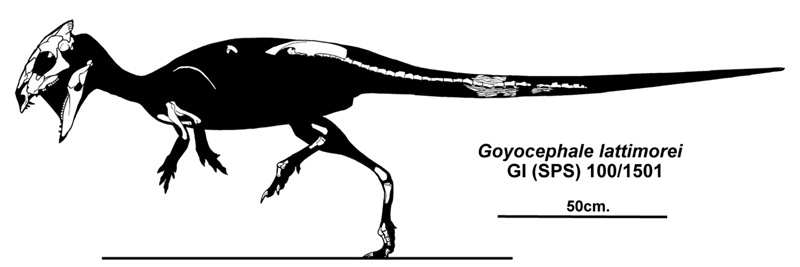
Skeletal reconstruction of Goyocephale lattimorei

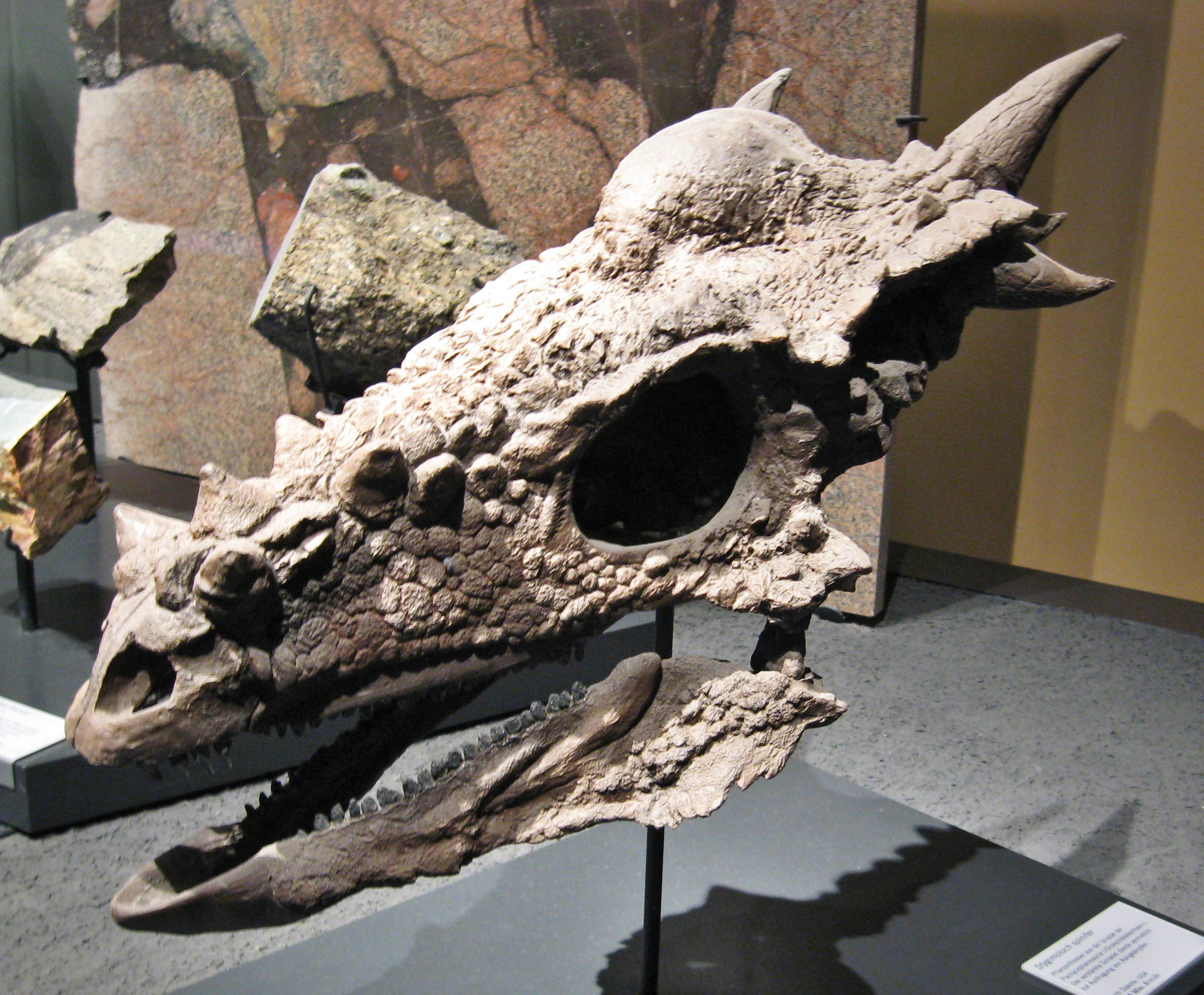
Skull of Stygimoloch spinifer

==== 1981 ====
- Ralph Chapman and others performed a detailed statistical analysis on the relative size of dome to braincase in 23 Stegoceras validum domes and domes from 6 other pachycephalosaur taxa. They were able to account for the age and development of the specimens using the size of the braincase as an indicator. The analysis uncovered two distinct variations in dome size probably denoting dimorphism between males and females. The form with the larger dome achieved the size of this feature by having a slightly higher rate of growth relative to the braincase.

==== 1982 ====
- Altangerel Perle, Maryańska and Osmólska described the new genus and species Goyocephale lattimorei.
- Perle and others followed Dong's 1978 suggestion that the Pachycephalosauria contained two families, the Homalocephalidae, which had flat heads, and the Pachycephalosauridae, which were characterized by the famous domed skulls.

==== 1983 ====
- Galton and Sues described the new genus Ornatotholus to house the species Stegoceras browni. They also described the new genus and species Stygimoloch spinifer. They noted that the bone composing its skull dome was rich in blood vessels.
- Peter Dodson argued that the rarity of pachycephalosaurs in the fossil record suggests that they preferred dryer habitats farther from coasts and rivers where ceratopsians and ornithopods lived and where fossilization is more likely to occur. He also observed that many pachycephalosaur fossils show signs of damage by transport over significant distances after death. He hypothesized that this explains why skeletal remains of Stegoceras validum are so rare compared to the isolated remains of their skull domes in the Judith River Formation. The sediments he attributed to the Judith River Formation are now considered part of the Dinosaur Park Formation.

==== 1986 ====
- Paul Sereno conducted the first comprehensive study of pachycephalosaur evolutionary relationships. He also named the Goyocephala and Homalocephaloidea.

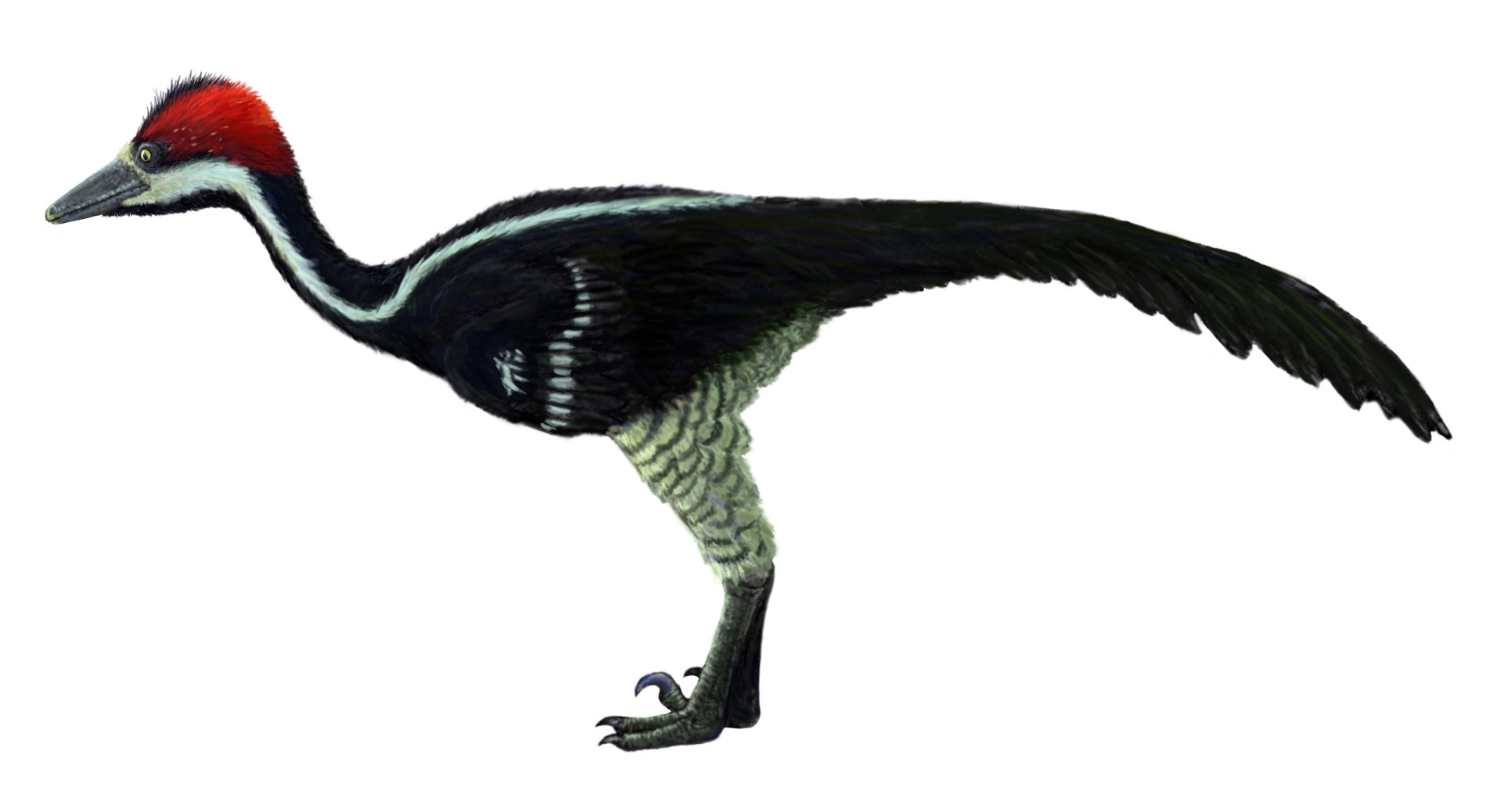
Artist's restoration of a troodontid

==== 1987 ====
- Emily Buchholtz Giffin, Diane Gabriel, and Rolf Johnson described the new genus and species Stenotholus kohleri.
- Sues and Galton conducted the second comprehensive study of pachycephalosaur evolutionary relationships. Unlike Sereno, they found that the flat-headed pachycephalosaur taxa formed a natural family called the Homalocephalidae. They further elaborated on their support for pachycephalosaurs using their skull domes for flank-butting rather than head-to-head butting.
- Currie noted traits in the teeth of Troodon that distinguished them from those of pachycephalosaurs. He split the Troodontidae off from the latter group and noted that the family Saurornithoididae, which then included many dinosaurs now considered troodontids, was actually its junior synonym.

==== 1989 ====
- Robert McNeill Alexander argued that since the forces generated by head-butting in pachycephalosaurs were probably smaller than previously expected and "glancing blows" sustained on impact presented little risk of harm to the animals involved, that head-butting was the likely function of the pachycephalosaur dome after all. He also contended that the flatter domes of primitive pachycephalosaurs were actually better suited for flank-butting than the rounded domes that supposedly put their owners at risk of injury in the case of a "glancing blow" at impact.

=== 1990s ===
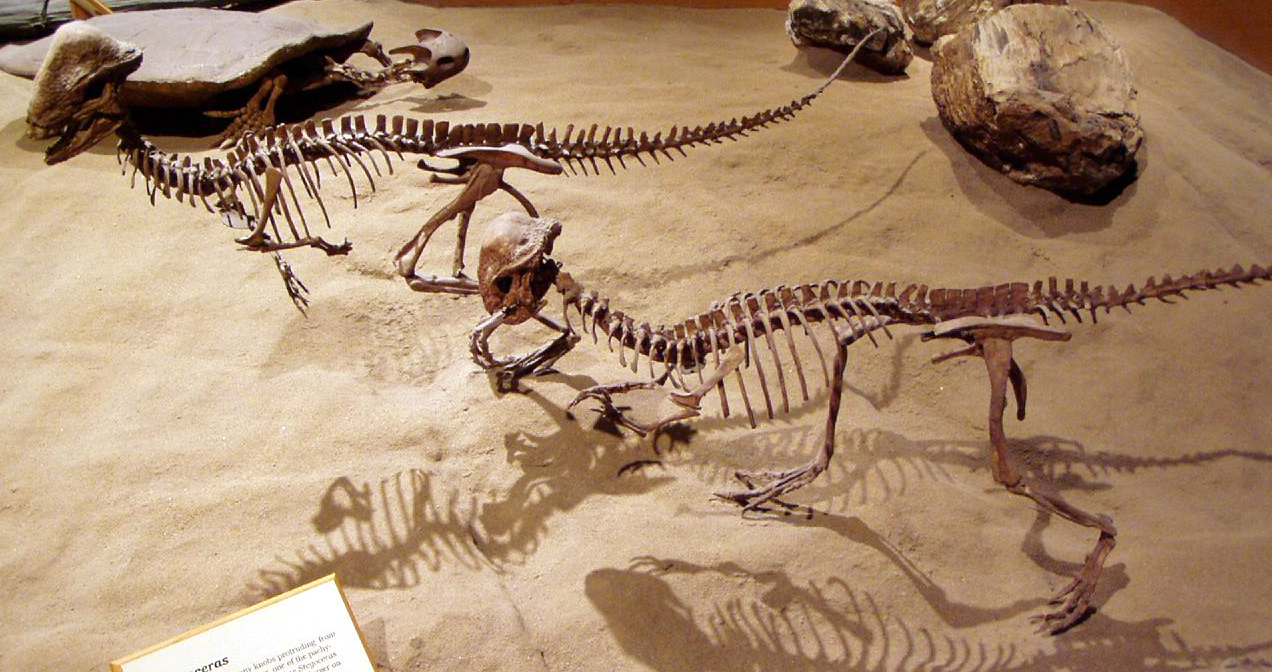
Skeletal mounts of Stegoceras

==== 1990 ====
- Maryańska followed Dong's 1978 suggestion, which had also been supported by Sues and Galton in 1987, that the Pachycephalosauria contained two families, the Homalocephalidae, which had flat heads, and the Pachycephalosauridae, which were characterized by the famous domed skulls.
- Chapman published a morphometric analysis of pachycephalosaur skulls.
- Mark Goodwin published a morphometric analysis of pachycephalosaur skulls.

==== 1996 ====
- David Fastovsky and David Weishampel examined the paleobiology and paleoecology of pachycephalosaurs in detail. They observed that pachycephalosaurs had differing teeth in different regions of the jaw. The front teeth were peg-like, sometimes the last of these front teeth was modified to appear fang-like. These teeth may have been used for gripping food, which would be chewed with the triangular cheek teeth. They also noticed that the wide rib cage and anatomy
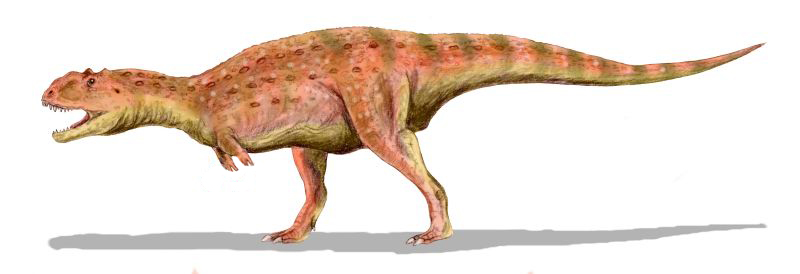
  Artist's restoration of the theropod Majungasaurus, formerly thought to be the pachycephalosaur Majungatholus
  of the spinal column and pelvis suggested that the fermentation of ingested plant matter happened farther along in pachycephalosaurs' digestive tracks than in ceratopsians and ornithopods.

==== 1997 ====
- Sereno named the Marginocephalia, a clade consisting of the pachycephalosaurs and ceratopsians.
- Chapman and others observed that Stegoceras validum is one of the best documented case of sexual dimorphism among dinosaurs.
- Carpenter elaborated on Sues' 1978 argument that pachycephalosaurs were more likely to use their skull domes to butt flanks rather than heads.
- Alexander reiterated his argument that since the forces generated by pachycephalosaurs head-butting were probably smaller than previously expected and "glancing blows" sustained on impact presented little risk of harm to the animals involved; thus head-butting was the likely function of the pachycephalosaur dome.

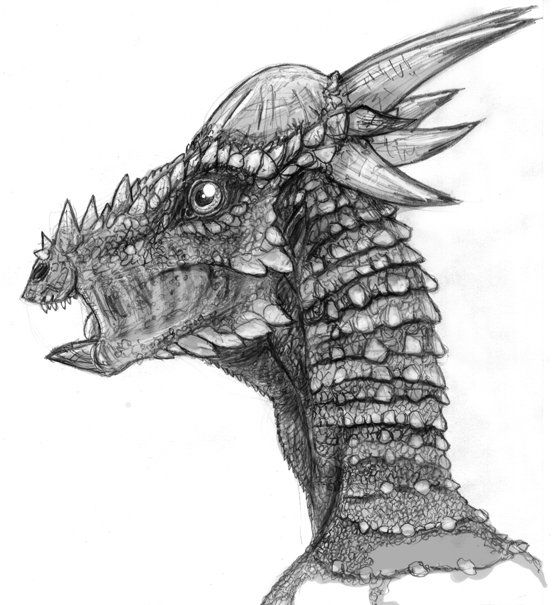
Artist's restoration of Stygimoloch

==== 1998 ====
- Scott Donald Sampson and others realized that Majungatholus atopus was actually a theropod.
- Goodwin and others argued that the shelf on the skulls of some specimens of Stegoceras validum might indicate the specimen's immaturity rather than its gender. They also argued against the reconstruction of the skull of Stygimoloch used by Carpenter the previous year that led him to support the idea that pachycephalosaurs butted flanks. They argued that the bone of the skull dome was too rich in blood vessels to function as a battering ram, but instead was probably purely for display. They suggested that the evolution of the use of pachycephalosaur skull domes may parallel the evolution of agonistic behavior in certain mammalian lineages, where more primitive forms engaged in flank butting which gave way to head butting and culminated in purely ornamental structures.
- Goodwin and Horner studied the microstructure of the dome of Stygimoloch and Stegoceras. They reiterated their argument that the bone was too rich in blood vessels to withstand the kinds of forces generated by head or flank butting. This vulnerability would apply just as well to collisions impacting the side of the skull as well as front-on.
- Chapman and others used 3D digital scans of pachycephalosaur domes to study whether or not their anatomy was suited for use in head-butting between members of the same species. They found that even pachycephalosaurs with very round skull domes had sufficient surface area for head-butting with little risk of charges ending in dangerous "glancing blows".

== 21st century ==
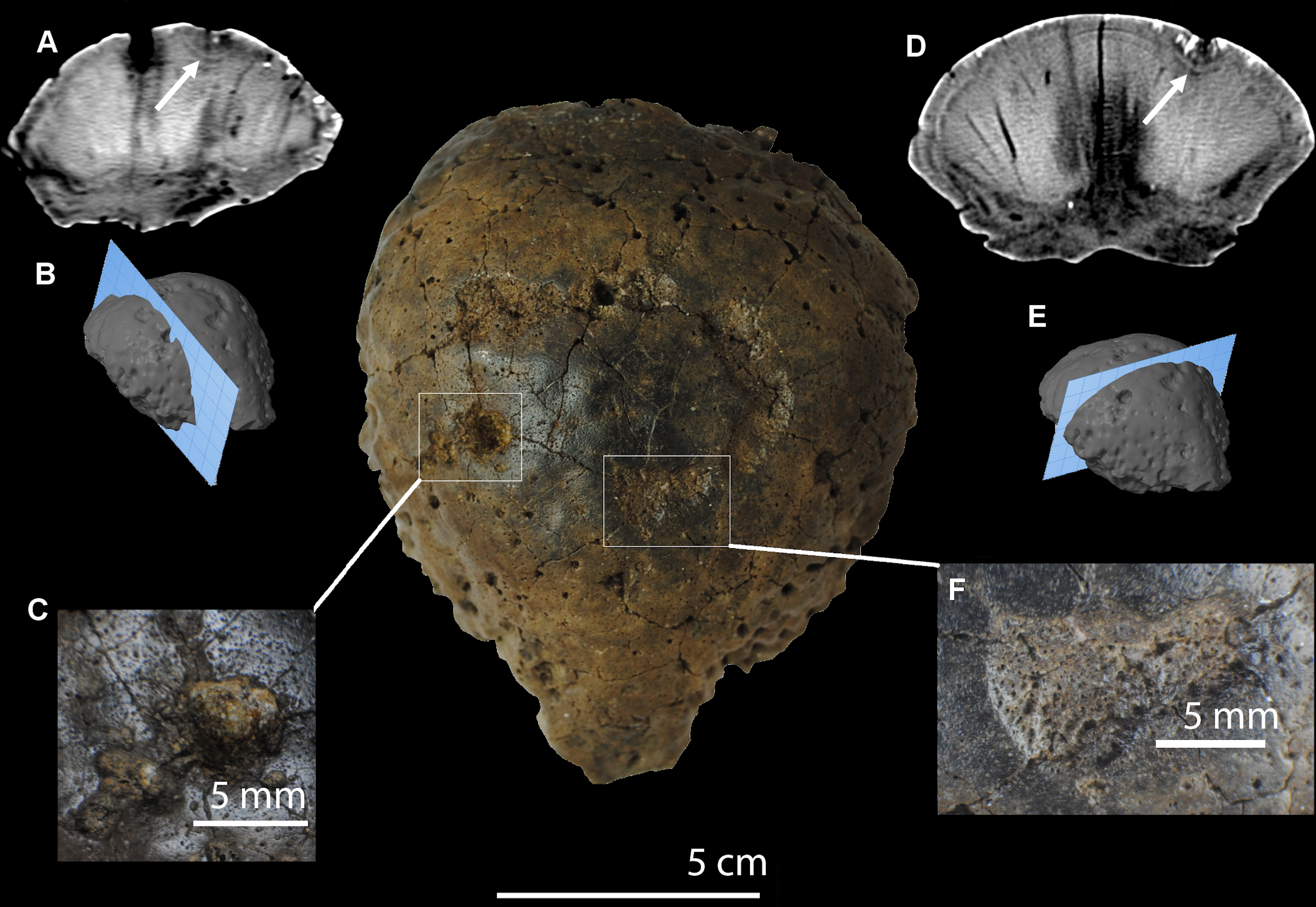
Hanssuesia

=== 2000s ===
==== 2002 ====
- Williamson and Carr described the new genus and species Sphaerotholus bucholtzae. He also described another species in that genus, S. goodwini.

==== 2003 ====
- Sullivan described the new genus Colepiocephale to house the species Stegoceras lambei. He also erected the new genus Hanssuesia to house the species Troodon sternbergi.

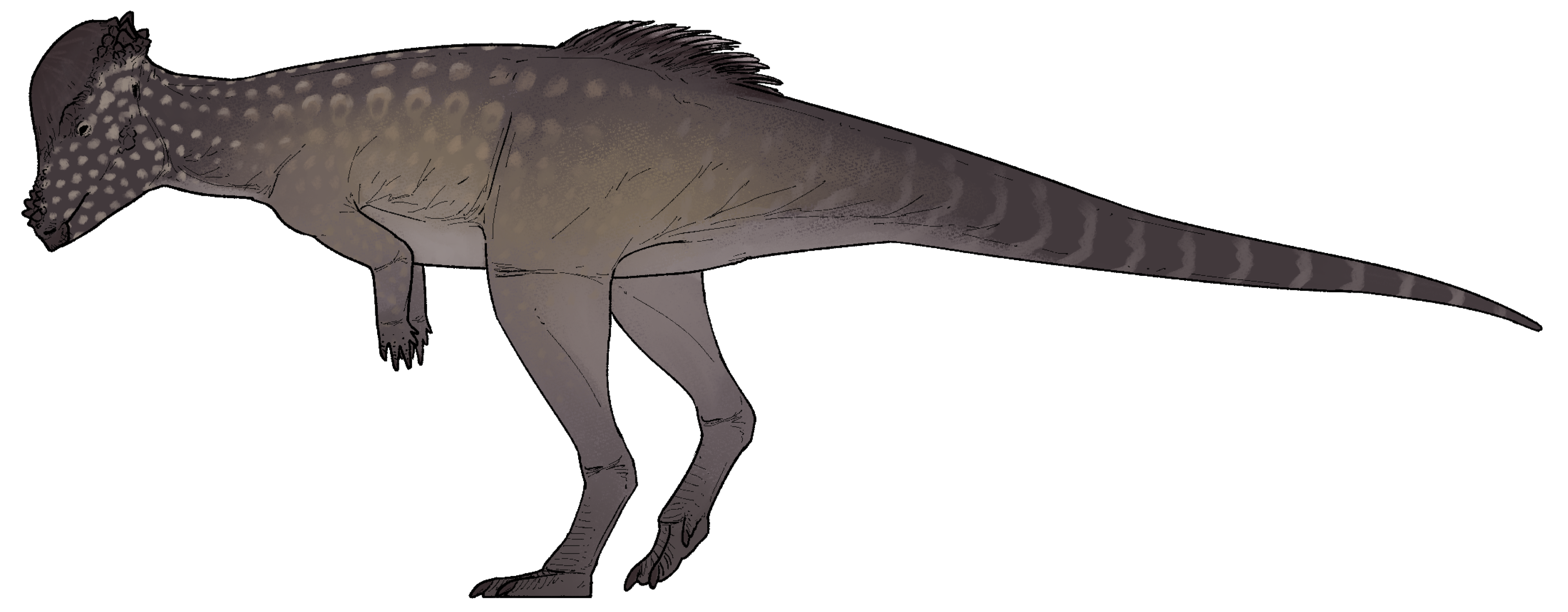
Artist's restoration of Alaskacephale

==== 2005 ====
- A. O. Averianov, T. Martin, and A. A. Bakirov described the new genus and species Ferganocephale adenticulatum.

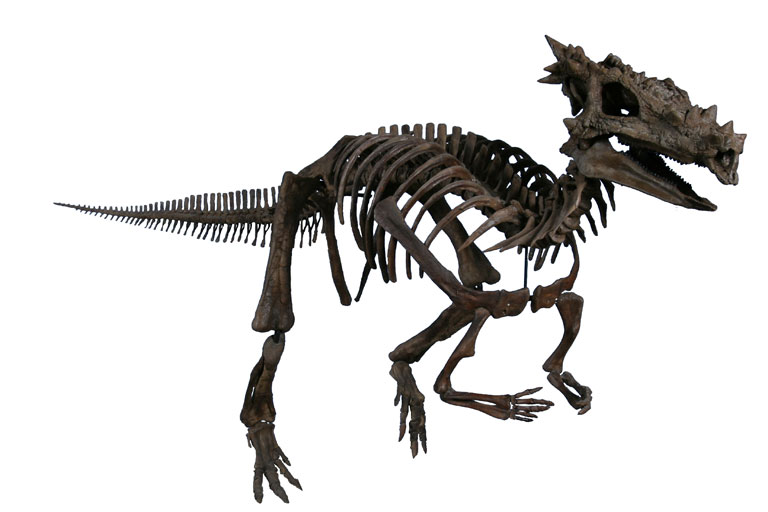
Skeletal mount of Dracorex

==== 2006 ====
- Sullivan described the new genus and species Alaskacephale gangloffi.
- Bakker and others described the new genus and species Dracorex hogwartsia.

=== 2010s ===
==== 2010 ====
- N. R. Longrich, J. Sankey, and D. Tanke described the new genus and species Texacephale langstoni.

==== 2011 ====
- Watabe, Tsogtbaatar and Sullivan described the new genus and species Amtocephale gobiensis.
- Jasinski and Sullivan described the new genus and species Stegoceras novomexicanum.

==== 2013 ====
- Evans and others described the new genus and species Acrotholus audeti.

== See also ==
- History of paleontology
  - Timeline of paleontology
- Timeline of ceratopsian research
- Timeline of troodontid research
