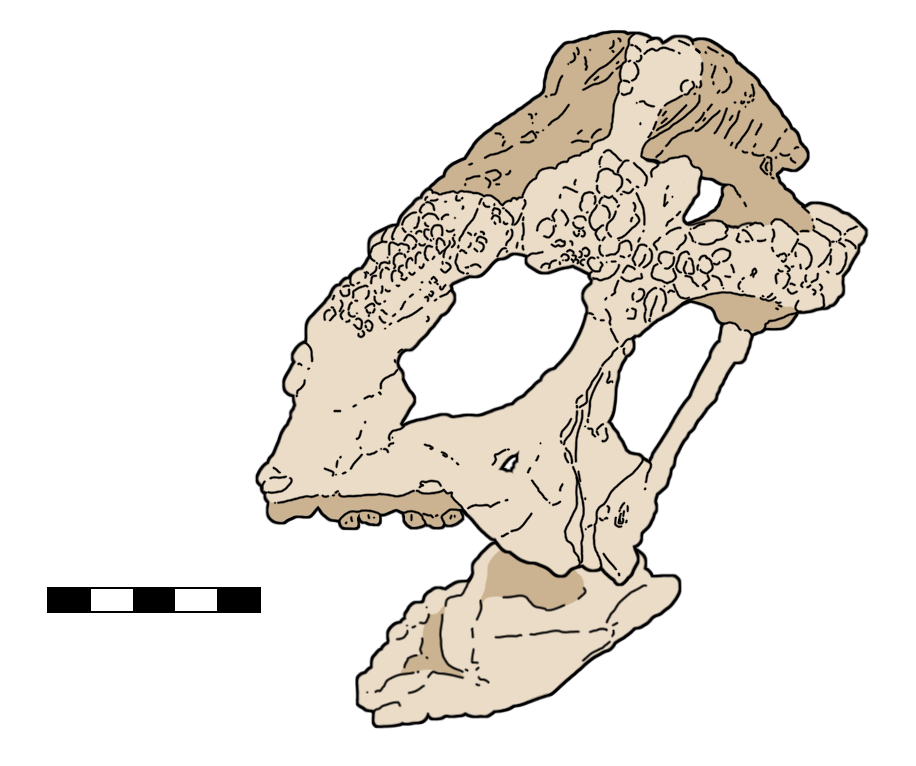
- Diagram of the holotype skull

Scientific classification
- Kingdom: Animalia
- Phylum: Chordata
- Class: Reptilia
- Clade: Dinosauria
- Clade: †Ornithischia
- Clade: †Pachycephalosauria
- Family: †Pachycephalosauridae
- Genus: †Tylocephale; Maryańska & Osmólska, 1974
- Species: †T. gilmorei

Binomial name
- †Tylocephale gilmorei Maryańska & Osmólska, 1974

= Tylocephale =

Tylocephale Temporal range: Late Cretaceous, Maastrichtian

Extinct genus of dinosaurs

Tylocephale (meaning "swollen head") is a genus of pachycephalosaurid dinosaur, a group of dome-headed, herbivorous ornithischians, that lived during the Maastrichtian stage of the Late Cretaceous in what is now Mongolia. It is known from a partial skull and associated mandible that were unearthed in 1971 by a Polish-Mongolian Expedition to the Barun Goyot Formation of the Gobi Desert. The specimen was described in 1974 by Polish paleontologists Teresa Maryańska and Halszka Osmólska as a new genus and species.

It was average-sized for a pachycephalosaur, reaching 2 m (6.6 ft) in length and 40 kg (88 lb) in body mass. The skull is triangular in back view, the widest point being at the jugals with an apex at the top of the dome. Tylocephale's dome is the tallest known from a pachycephalosaur. This dome is also unusually thick and rugose on its exterior. Behind the dome, an array of spikes, nodes, and tubercules protrude posteriorly over the neck. The eyebrow ridge was ornamented with small, bony nodules and was thicker than in other genera. Tylocephale is closely related to other Asian pachycephalosaurs, like Homalocephale and Goyocephale, being part of the Old World branch of the group.

Being a pachycephalosaur it was herbivorous with small, ridged teeth adapted to break down fibrous plants. Its dentition also bears serrations, implying a potentially more heterogeneous diet of leaves, nuts, seeds, and insects. Fossils were found in the Khulsan locality, which preserves fossils of many other dinosaur groups like ceratopsians, ankylosaurs, oviraptorosaurs, dromaeosaurs, and a titanosaur. The Barun Goyot Formation was an alluvial plain, featuring large riverways in an arid to semi-arid climate.

== Discovery and naming ==
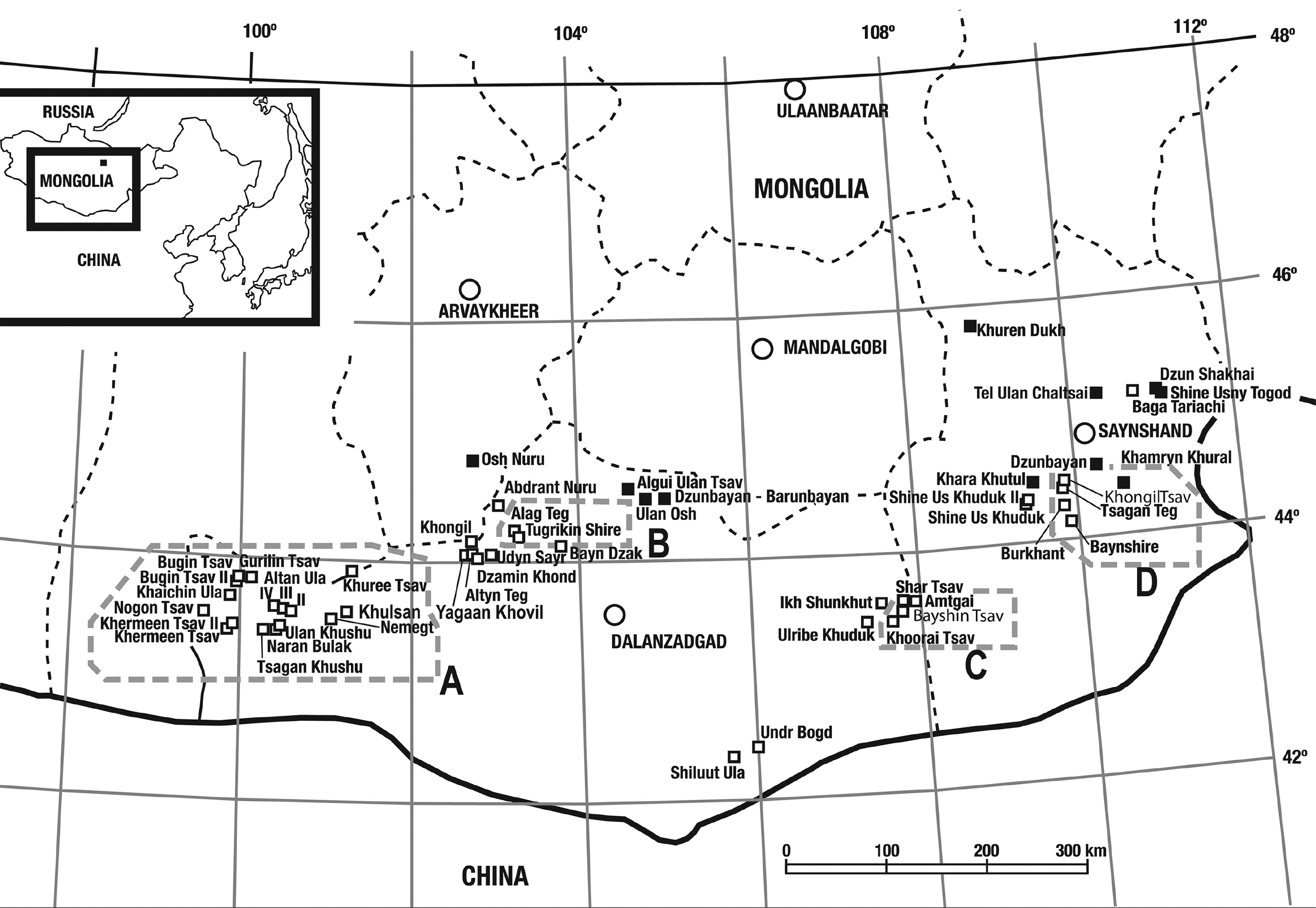
Cretaceous-aged dinosaur fossil localities of Mongolia; Tylocephale fossils are known from the Khulsan site of area A (left).

During a joint Polish-Mongolian Expedition to the Khulsan outcrop of the Barun Goyot Formation in the Gobi Desert, a large skull and mandible of a pachycephalosaur (catalogue number ZPAL MgD-I/105) was unearthed in 1971. The rock layers of the Barun Goyot Formation derive from the Early Maastrichtian stage of the Late Cretaceous, in numerical terms around 72 to 71 million years old. This was one of a series of expeditions carried out between 1963 and 1971 that were spearheaded by Polish paleontologist Zofia Kielan-Jaworowska, which collected scores of well-preserved dinosaur skeletons. Several other Polish scientists joined the venture, including Teresa Maryańska and Halszka Osmólska, who were aided by local Mongolian aides. The skull was incomplete, missing much of the anterior portions and the rest of the bony dome. The mandible and skull were preserved in articulation, laying loose in weathered sandstone blocks from a former river channel. The specimen was one of several dinosaur individuals discovered at Khulsan during the 1970s, with material of the ankylosaurs Tarchia and Saichania, ceratopsid Breviceratops, and theropod Hulsanpes found in the locale. All of the fossils unearthed during this expedition were then transported to the Polish Academy of Sciences in Warsaw, where they were described in the following years.

The pachycephalosaur skull found at Khulsan was one of several collected during the Polish-Mongolian Expeditions, with other specimens in the nearby Nemegt Formation gathered in addition to Barun Goyot. The pachycephalosaur material from both formations was described in scientific literature in the journal Palaeontologica Polonica in 1974 by Teresa Maryańska and Halszka Osmólska. The skull found at Khulsan was designated the type specimen of a new genus and species, Tylocephale gilmorei. The genus name Tylocephale comes from the Greek words tyle ("swollen") and cephale ("head") and refers to the skull's prominent cranial dome. The species name honors American paleontologist Charles Gilmore, who wrote the first detailed description of a pachycephalosaur. The 1974 paper also dubbed two new pachycephalosaurs based on the fossils from Nemegt, Homalocephale and Prenocephale. All of these taxa were grouped in a new order Maryańska and Osmólska named Pachycephalosauria, which contained North American genera like Stegoceras and Pachycephalosaurus as well.

== Description ==
Size comparison

Tylocephale was a medium-sized pachycephalosaur, with estimates of 2 m (6.6 ft) in length and 40 kg (88 lb) in body mass. No postcranial fossils belonging to Tylocephale have been found, though there are well preserved skeletons of the related Stegoceras, Homalocephale, and Prenocephale. Based on these taxa, Tylocephale had a short neck, tiny forelimbs, long hindlimbs, and a thick, rodlike tail for balance. The neck was slender and U-shaped, and held in a curved posture, attaching at the occipital condyle on the back of the skull. Its spinal column bore firm connections between the vertebrae that were reinforced by ossified tendons. Its arms were lightly built and slender ending in a hand with five fingers. The limbs terminated in a pes with three toes, the middle being the longest, all of which had unguals.

=== Skull and ornamentation ===
The only known specimen consists of a partial skull lacking the braincase, palate, and anterior parts of the skull. Its posterior half of the mandible is preserved as well. Most dinosaurs have three fenestrae (hollow spaces) in their skulls, but Tylocephale bears only two. The infratemporal fenestra is angled vertically and is the same width for much of its length. The skull is very tall and narrow posteriorly with a stubby postorbital portion. Notably, the skull roof is tall with an apex very close to the posterior margin of the cranium. This roof is also thicker and bears a peak further posteriorly than observed in other members of the group, a distinguishing feature of the taxon. The dorsal part of the squamosal is the densest element of the skull, as well as being sharpened and not smoothened or swollen. However, the ventral surface of the squamosal is thinner and contacts the exoccipital.

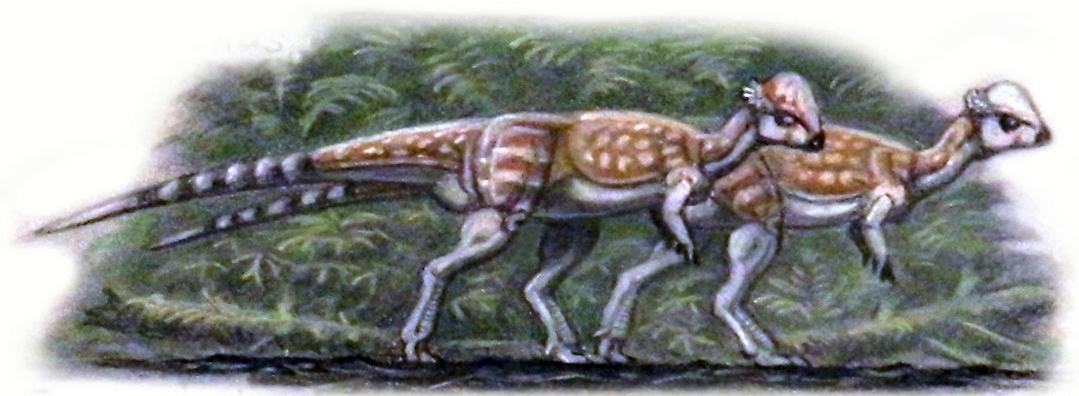
Life restoration of a pair of Tylocephale

All of the occipital bones are thin compared to the rest of the skull. The quadrates are elongated and align near perfectly with the mandibles. This allowed for a solid articulation of the skull and lower jaws. Its quadrate is positioned vertically and is perpendicular to the margin of the maxilla. In contrast, the jugal (cheek bone) is robustly built and oriented laterally. The jugals are the widest point of the skull and triangular in cross-section. The splanchnocranium's (back part of cranium) lateral wall, jugal, and quadratojugal (cheekbone) form a transversely broad structure. The orbit (eye socket) is very broad with an eyebrow ridge above the opening, as in other pachycephalosaurs. Its upper edge is flattened, with a narrow postorbital bar parallel to the quadrate. Both supraorbitals are preserved but incomplete. They are tall and thick in cross-section, making up a large section of the dome.

Cranial ornamentation is characteristic of pachycephalosaurs, which often bear three structures; nodes, tubers, and spikes. These ornaments became largest in the squamosal and smaller closer to the front of the cranium. The supraorbitals and postorbitals exhibit some ornamentation, but it is not exceptionally rugged. Tylocephale's jugals have giant, protruding, and irregularly spaced tubers. The dome, unlike in some other pachycephalosaurs, had a rough texture. The squamosals on the posterior margin of the skull had a series of giant spikes and tubers. Of these, the biggest was located below the outermost node of the series. These spiked nodes continue along the length of the squamosal and postorbital.

=== Teeth and mandible ===
The tooth row is incomplete, but nine teeth from the back of the jaws are preserved. All of the teeth but the last are arranged in a straight line, a unique trait of the genus. The teeth have been damaged due to outside factors like erosion and taphonomy. Maryańska and Osmólska noted that proportionally, the dentition of Tylocephale is much larger than that of other pachycephalosaurs like Homalocephale. Teeth, seven in number, have high crowns and arched cutting surfaces. Like the teeth, the mandible is very poorly preserved, consisting only of the posterior portions. It has a weakly-elevated coronoid process of the ramus, which would articulate with the jugal. However, the adductor fossa is very deep and well-developed in transverse view. This fossa, located between the dentary and articular surface, was used for muscle connections, nerves, and veins with the jugal.

== Classification ==
Tylocephale was a member of the group Pachycephalosauria, a family of thick-skulled, herbivorous, bipedal dinosaurs which lived during the Cretaceous period in Asia and North America. The last pachycephalosaurs went extinct during the Cretaceous-Paleogene extinction event, the last surviving genus being Pachycephalosaurus itself. However, a 2020 cladistic analysis recovered the heterodontosaurids as an early branch of the group, which extend the age of pachycephalosaurs as far back as the Early Jurassic. Currently, pachycephalosaurs are recognized as being part of the larger group Marginocephalia which encompasses it and the gigantic, horned ceratopsians.

Within Pachycephalosauria, the phylogenetic position of Tylocephale and other genera are in flux due to a lack of many well-preserved specimens. Despite this, the pachycephalosaurs of Asia such as Tylocephale, Homalocephale, and Goyocephale are often recovered in a similar grade, whereas the North American Pachycephalosaurus, Stygimoloch, and Alaskacephale are in a distinct group. The Asian members also are more basal, with fewer advanced characteristics compared to their North American counterparts. This is due to pachycephalosaurs originating in Asia before dispersing to North America during its brief Late Cretaceous reconnection with Asia. Tylocephale specifically is most closely related to the dome-headed Foraminacephale and flat-headed Homalocephale according to most recent phylogenetic analyses. It has been suggested that instead of being its own species, Tylocephale gilmorei is a synonym of Prenocephale prenes. A similar suggestion has been made about Homalocephale. Later studies on the histology of younger Prenocephale specimens also prove its distinction from Homalocephale and Tylocephale.

Below on the left is Tylocephale's position within Pachycephalosauridae according to Schott & Evans' 2016 publication on the classification of Foraminacephale, which recovers it as more basal to a larger North American clade. On the bottom right is the phylogenetic location of Pachycephalosauria as a whole based on Dieudonné et al (2020):

- Pachycephalosauria
  - Wannanosaurus yanshiensis
  - Pachycephalosauridae
    - - Hanssuesia sternbergi
      - Colepiocephale lambei
      - Stegoceras validum
      - Stegoceras novomexicanum
    - Pachycephalosaurinae
      - Goyocephale lattimorei
      - - Homalocephale calathocercos
        - - Tylocephale gilmorei
          - - Foraminacephale brevis
            - - Amtocephale gobienses
              - - Prenocephale prenes
                - Acrotholus audeti
                - - - Pachycephalosaurus wyomingensis
                    - Alaskacephale gangloffi
                    - - Dracorex hogwartsia
                      - Stygimoloch spinifer
                  - - Sphaerotholus goodwini
                    - Sphaerotholus buchholtzae

== Paleobiology ==
=== Diet ===
It is uncertain what pachycephalosaurs ate; having very small, ridged teeth they could not have chewed tough, fibrous plants as effectively as other dinosaurs of the same period. It is assumed that their sharp, serrated teeth were ideally suited for a mixed diet of leaves, seeds, fruit, and insects. Tylocephale may have had an entirely herbivorous diet, as the tooth crowns were similar to those of iguanid lizards. The premaxillary teeth show wear facets from contact with the predentary bone, and the maxillary teeth have double wear facets similar to those seen in other ornithischian dinosaurs. Every third maxillary tooth of UALVP 2 are erupting replacement teeth, and tooth replacement happened in backwards progression in sequential threes. The occipital region of Stegoceras was well-demarcated for muscle-attachment and it is believed that the jaw movement of Stegoceras and other pachycephalosaurs was mostly limited to up-and-down motions with only a slight capability for jaw rotation. This is based on the structure of the jaw and dental microwear and wear facets of the teeth indicate that the bite-force was used more for shearing than for crushing. However, it has been suggested that Tylocephale differed from Stegoceras by having a back-and-forth jaw motion instead of up-and-down. This propalinal motion would shift food back-and-forth in the mouth.

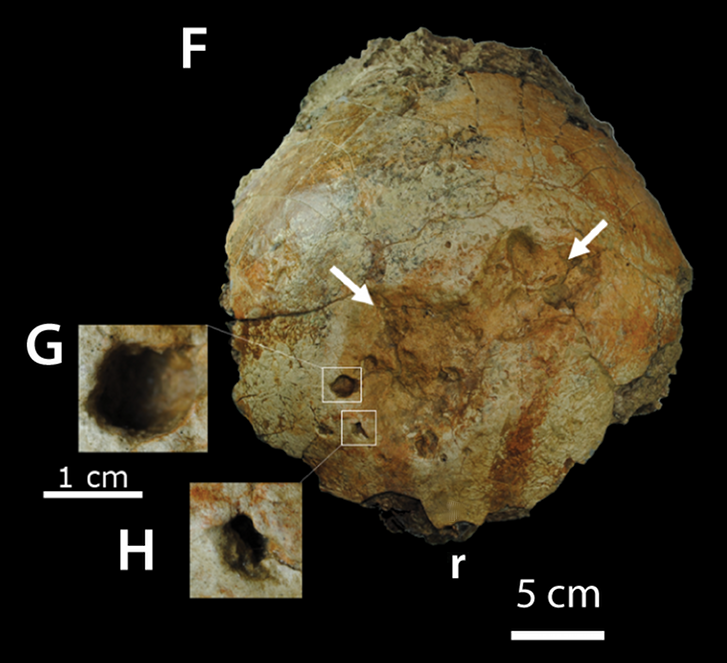
Lesions on the skull of the related Pachycephalosaurus, possibly caused by head-butting.

=== Dome function ===
Tylocephale has been noted for its prominent dome, a trait shared by other pachycephalosaurids, which was covered in keratin. The dome function of Tylocephale itself has not been analyzed in detail, but a similar dome of Prenocephale was tested by biologists Eric Snively and Adam Cox in 2008. The study conducted a finite element analysis of 2D and 3D pachycephalosaur skulls, which found that high-vaulted domes like that of Tylocephale could sustain higher forces of impact than other pachycephalosaurs'. Tylocephale's dome is most similar to Pachycephalosaurus' with the presence of fused sutures, tubercules on the mandible and nasal, and expanded shelves on the squamosal. These traits are missing in primitive taxa such as Stegoceras, Homalocephale, and Goyocephale. Tylocephale, Prenocephale, and Pachycephalosaurus' extra ornamentation suggest that the dome was not purely for display or species recognition, but for agonistic behaviors like head-butting. Another study found that the correlations between head-striking and skull morphologies found in living animals also existed in the studied pachycephalosaurs. Stegoceras and Prenocephale both had skull shapes similar to the bighorn sheep with cancellous bone protecting the brain. They also shared similarities in the distribution of compact and cancellous regions with the bighorn sheep, white-bellied duiker, and the giraffe. The white-bellied duiker was found to be the closest morphological analogue to Stegoceras; this head-butting species has a dome which is smaller but similarly rounded. Stegoceras was better capable of dissipating force than artiodactyls that butt heads at high forces, but the less vascularized domes of older pachycephalosaurs, and possibly diminished ability to heal from injuries, argued against such combat in older individuals. The study also tested the effects of a keratinous covering of the dome and found it to aid in performance.

== Paleoenvironment ==
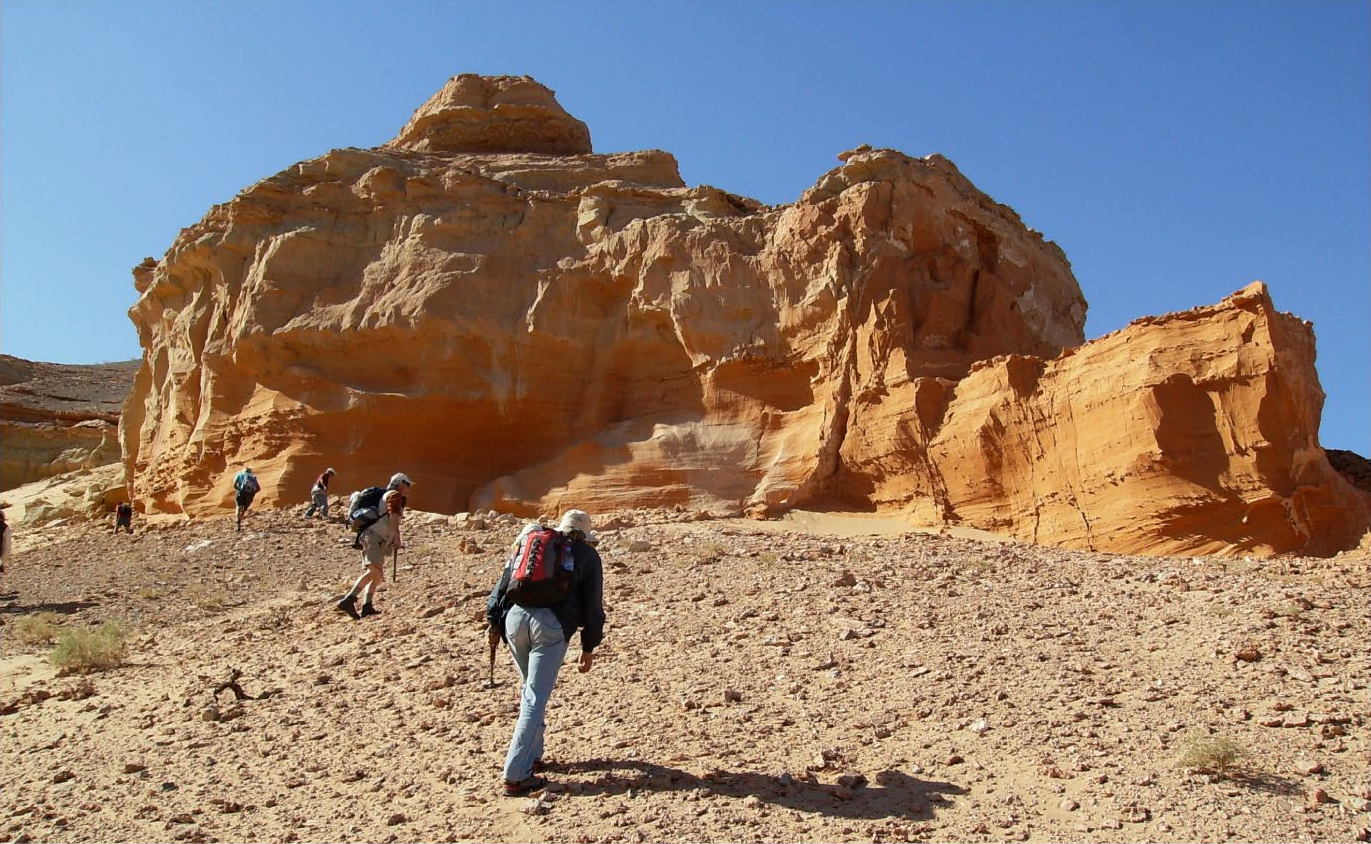
Sediments of Hermiin Tsav, a locality in the Barun Goyot Formation.

The Barun Goyot Formation, based on sediments, is regarded as Late Cretaceous in age (Middle-Upper Campanian). This formation is mostly characterized by a series of red beds, mostly light-coloured sands (yellowish, grey-brown, and rarely reddish) that are locally cemented. Sandy claystones (often red-coloured), siltstones, conglomerates, and large-scale trough cross-stratification in sands are also common across the unit. In addition, structureless, medium-grained, fine-grained, and very fine-grained sandstones predominate in sediments of the Barun Goyot Formation. The sediments of this formation were deposited in alluvial plain (flat land consisting of sediments deposited by highland rivers), lacustrine, and aeolian paleoenvironments, under relatively arid to semiarid climates.

Tylocephale is endemic to the Barun Goyot Formation, which was also home to many other vertebrates, including the ankylosaurids Saichania, Tarchia and Zaraapelta; alvarezsaurids Khulsanurus and Parvicursor; birds Gobipipus, Gobipteryx and Hollanda; protoceratopsids Bagaceratops and Breviceratops; dromaeosaurids Kuru and Shri devi; halszkaraptorine Hulsanpes; and oviraptorids Conchoraptor, Heyuannia and Nemegtomaia. Other taxa are represented by the large titanosaur Quaesitosaurus, and a wide diversity of mammals and squamates.

== See also ==
- Timeline of pachycephalosaur research
