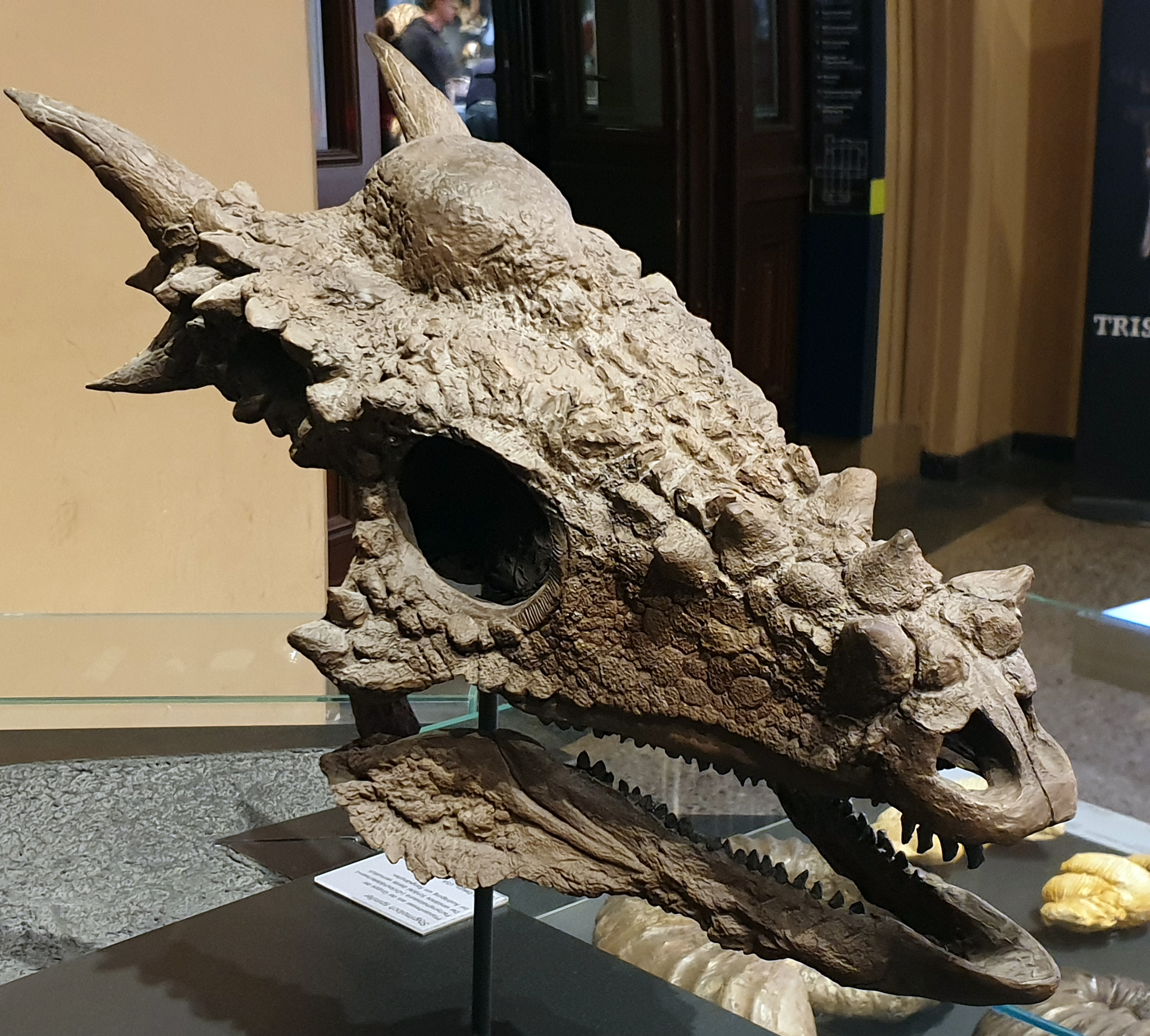
- Reconstructed skull cast of Stygimoloch at the Museum of Natural History, Berlin

Scientific classification
- Kingdom: Animalia
- Phylum: Chordata
- Class: Reptilia
- Clade: Dinosauria
- Clade: †Ornithischia
- Clade: †Pachycephalosauria
- Family: †Pachycephalosauridae
- Tribe: †Pachycephalosaurini
- Genus: †Stygimoloch; Galton & Sues, 1983
- Species: †S. spinifer

Binomial name
- †Stygimoloch spinifer Galton & Sues, 1983

Synonyms
- Stenotholus kohleri Giffin, Gabriel & Johnson, 1987; Dracorex? Bakker et al., 2006

= Stygimoloch =

Stygimoloch Temporal range: Late Maastrichtian, 66 Ma

Genus of pachycephalosaurid dinosaurs

Stygimoloch is a disputed genus of pachycephalosaur (dome-headed dinosaur) from the end of the Cretaceous period, roughly 66 million years ago. Its fossils have been found across Western North America but primarily hail from the Hell Creek Formation in Montana. Though the first known specimen was discovered in the 1800s, it was first recognised as a distinct genus in 1983 based on horned squamosal bones and given the name Stygimoloch spinifer. Its name is derived from the mythological river Styx, Moloch, and the Latin term for possessing spines. An isolated dome was given the distinct genus and species Stenotholus kohleri in 1987, but shortly thereafter the discovery of a more complete skull including a dome and squamosals indicated it was a junior synonym of Stygimoloch. It can be distinguished from other pachycephalosaurs by its possession of clusters of elongate spikes on the back of its head and the especially narrow form of its dome. Classically interpreted as a close relative of the contemporary genus Pachycephalosaurus, a 2009 theory posited that it alongside Dracorex is instead a juvenile form of Pachycephalosaurus, rather than a distinct animal. Its taxonomic status remains in dispute, with some studies treating it as a synonym of Pachycephalosaurus, while others retain it as a distinct genus that may have lived after Pachycephalosaurus.

== History and taxonomy ==
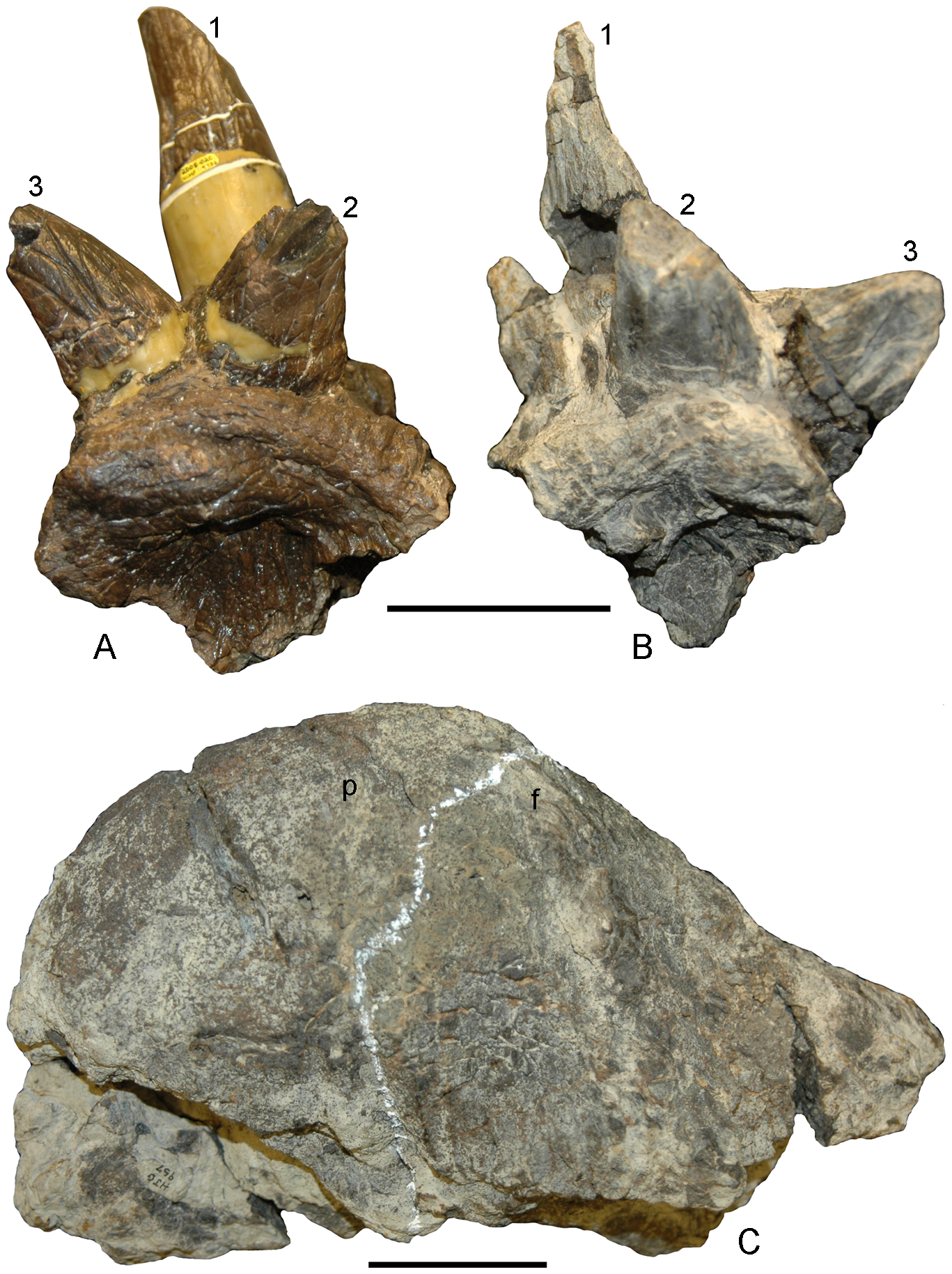
Holotype squamosal UCMP 119433 (upper left) and referred squamosal and dome UCMP 131163 (upper right, bottom)

Stygimoloch spinifer was named in 1983 by Peter M. Galton and Hans-Dieter Sues based on a horned left squamosal bone (forming the back of the skull) of a pachycephalosaur. The specimen is catalogued as UCMP 119433, and was found in rocks of the Hell Creek Formation in McCone County, Montana. In addition to it, a right squamosal previously identified as armour of the dinosaur Triceratops in 1896 was recognised as a second Stygimoloch specimen. These specimens were distinguished from all other pachycephalosaurs by possessing large horns on their squamosals rather than simply small bony knobs. The name "Stygimoloch derives from the river Styx of the Underworld in Greek mythology, in reference to Hell Creek, and from Moloch, in reference to the strange appearance of the animal. The specific name spinifer means "carrying spines" in Latin, referencing the distinct squamosal horns.

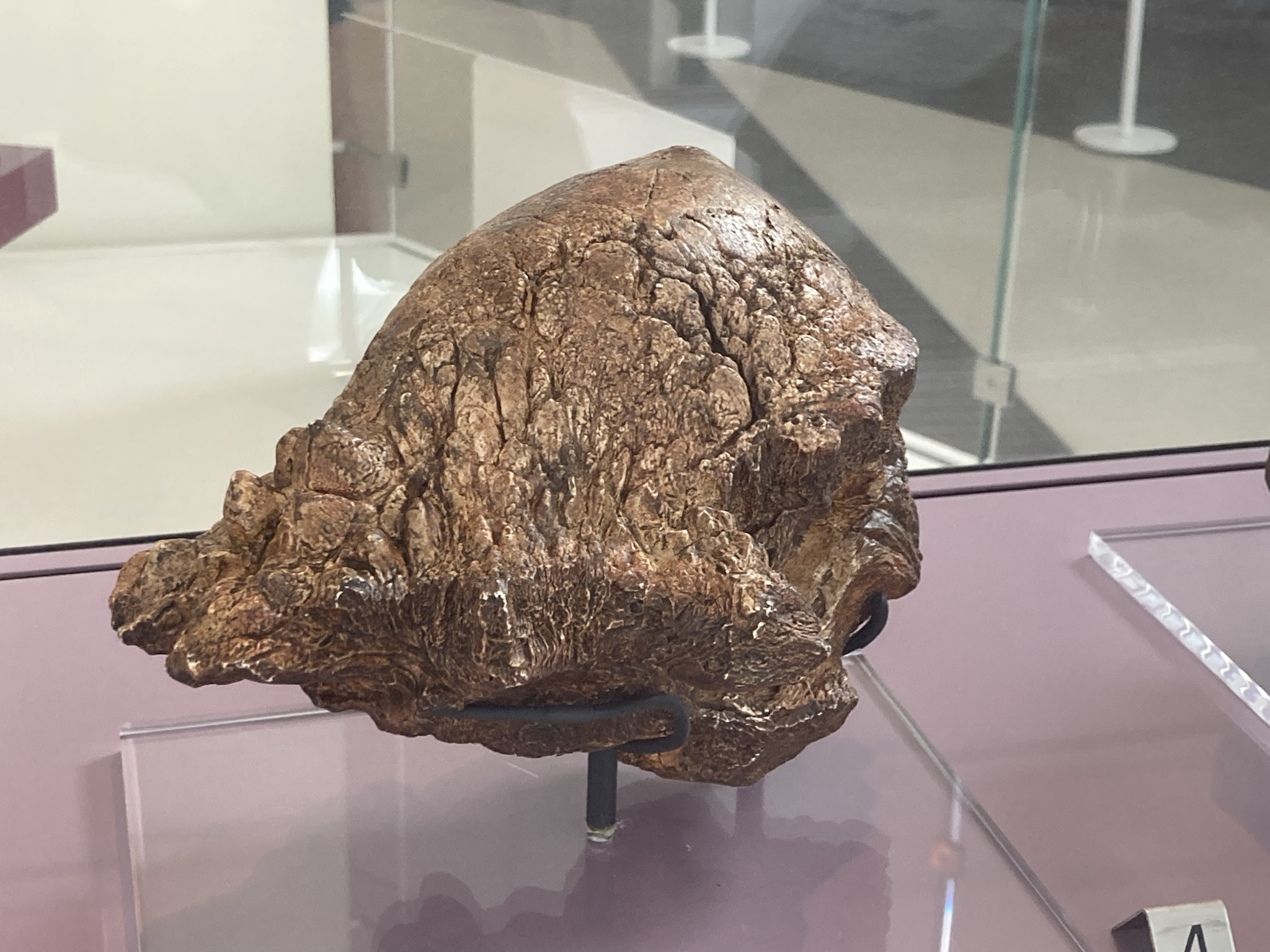
Cast of skull MPN 7111 originally named as "Stenotholus"

Four years later in 1987, Emily B. Giffin, Diane L. Gabriel and Rolf E. Johnson named an isolated pachycephalosaur dome (a bulbous structure on the head, formed by the frontal and parietal bones) also from Hell Creek in McCone County as the new genus and species Stenotholus kohleri. The specimen, MPM 7111, was distinguished by its tall and narrow dome. However, multiple new pachycephalosaur specimens were discovered from the Hell Creek Formation by the Milwaukee Public Museum in the same year. These included a partial pachycephalosaur skull (MPM 8111) that possessed both elongate squamosal horns and a narrow dome. Consequently, Gabriel would conclude the following year that Stygimoloch and Stenotholus were the same species, a conclusion followed by later authors. In 1998, Mark B. Goodwin, Emily A. Buchholtz and Rolf E. Johnson formally described this skull alongside several additional domes and squamosal horns. Further specimens would later be discovered but come into the ownership of private collectors, unable to be studied. This includes the most complete known skull, found by Clayton Phipps in 2003 and later sold for $40,000.

In 2009, John R. Horner and Mark B. Goodwin proposed that Stygimoloch, along with the domeless pachycephalosaur Dracorex, were actually juvenile specimens of Pachycephalosaurus rather than distinct species that lived alongside it. They considered Stygimoloch to represent an intermediate stage, with a partially developed dome and larger spikes than Dracorex which were later reabsorbed into the short, blunt ornamentation seen in Pachycephalosaurus. They supported this conclusion with the fact that all known domes of Stygimoloch lacked fusion of the left and right frontal bones, considered a sign of immaturity, whereas the domes of Pachycephalosaurus showed complete fusion. Some later studies would tentatively accept this interpretation.

Denver Fowler would question a one species model in 2017, as he noted that Pachycephalosaurus appeared restricted to the lower geologic layers of Hell Creek and Stygimoloch to the higher layers (indicating they lived at different times). He considered Dracorex likely to be a juvenile Stygimoloch, and noted Stenotholus (from the middle layers) could be an intermediate form between Pachycephalosaurus and Stygimoloch. Following Fowler's observation, a 2021 study by David Evans and colleagues and a 2025 study by Anton Wroblewski would tentatively treat Stygimoloch as distinct. Wroblewski assigned a left squamosal discovered from the Ferris Formation in 1995 to Stygimoloch, extending its range into southern Wyoming. The specimen is dated to only 320,000 years before the end-Cretaceous extinction. Based on study of modern alligator growth published in 2026, James Napoli considered Horner and Goodwin's proposal of extreme ontogenetic change unlikely.

== Description ==
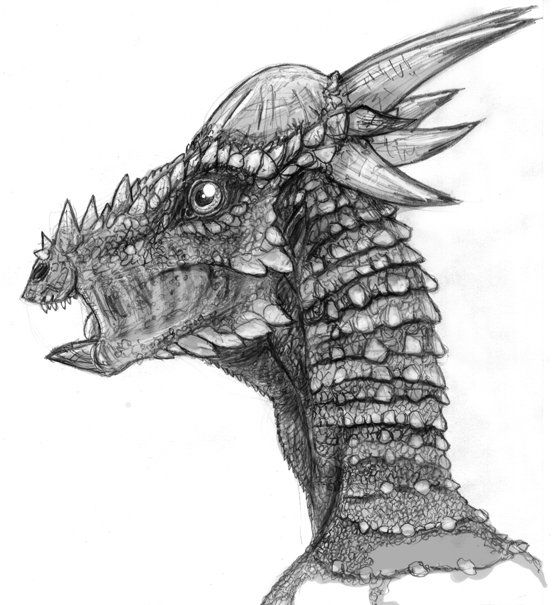
Life restoration of a Stygimoloch head

As a species of pachycephalosaur, Stygimoloch would have been a small bipedal animal with a highly ornamented skull. A large, rounded structure known as a dome covered much of the back of the skull, formed of solid bone. The top edge of the back of the skull, formed by the parietal and squamosal bones, overhang the rest of the rear skull. As a member of Pachycephalosaurini, Stygimoloch would have possessed a longer skull than most pachycephalosaurs, with numerous pyramidal hornlets decorating the end of the snout. The "Stenotholus" specimen, MPM 7111, also possesses extensive hornlike ornamentation on the front edge of the dome.

In all Stygimoloch, the dome has a distinctive tall and a narrow shape unlike the wider domes of other pachycephalosaurs. This dome does not reach the rear of the skull, with a large flat shelf formed by the squamosal bones behind it. On each side of this squamosal are clusters of large spikes unlike those seen in other pachycephalosaurs. This clustered arrangement is similar to the arrangement of short bony nodes in Pachycephalosaurus, and distinct from the rows of nodes seen in other pachycehalosaurs. Each cluster bears three to four horns, centred around one especially large primary horn. Smaller bony nodes surround the horns. Under the interpretation of Horner and Goodwin (2009), wherein Stygimoloch is considered as a juvenile of Pachycephalosaurus, individuals possessing "Stygimoloch" anatomy would later grow much wider domes and reabsorb their spike clusters into short, rounded knobs.

== Classification ==
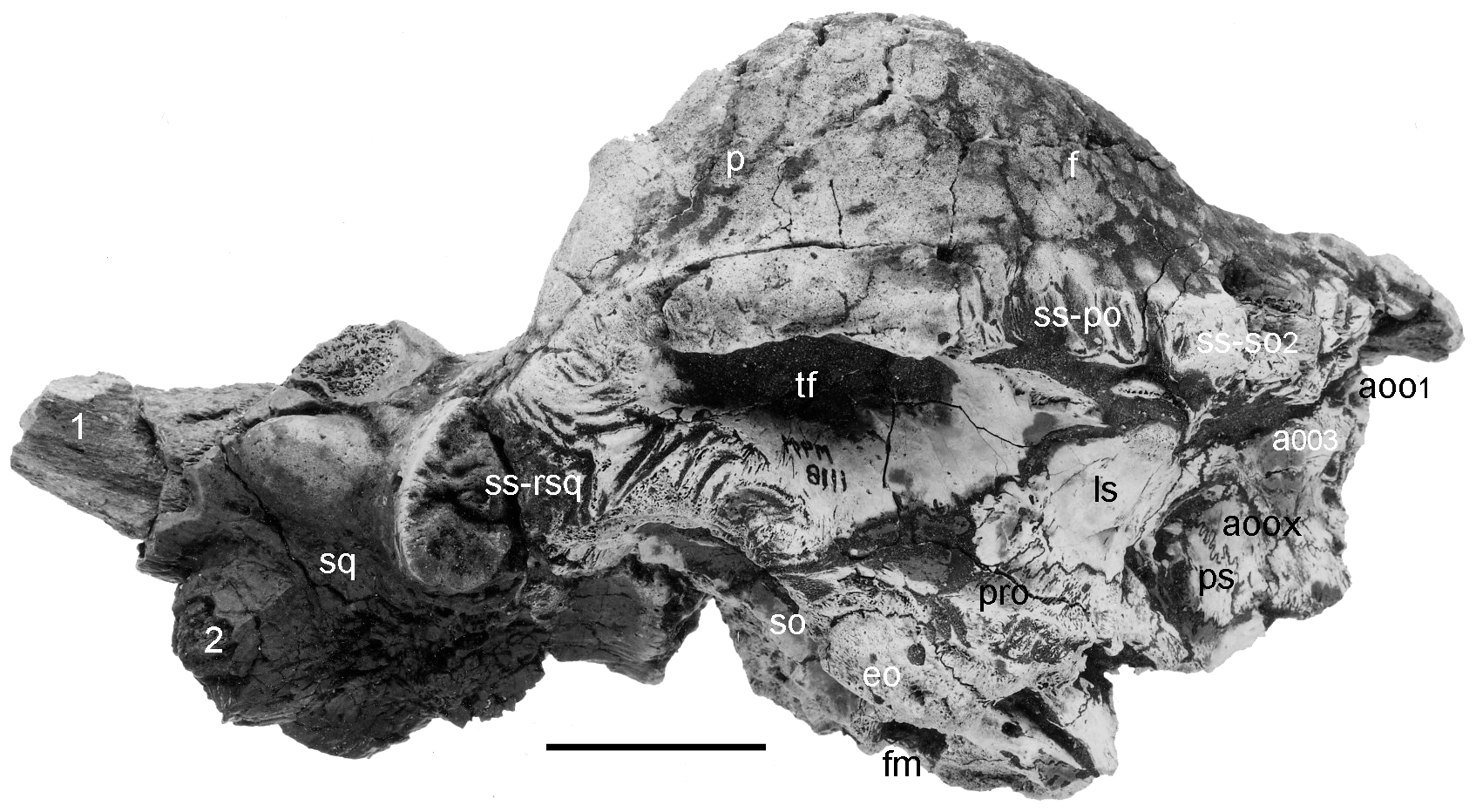
Skull of specimen MPM 8111

Upon its naming in 1983, Stygimoloch was recognised as a member of the family Pachycephalosauridae, a family or ornithischian dinosaurs. These are typically thought to be related to horned ceratopsian dinosaurs, forming the group Marginocephalia. The initial squamosal material was considered insufficient to determine its specific relationship to other pachycephalosaurs. The first known dome, initially named as the distinct genus "Stenotholus", was considered to be a derived pachycephalosaur closely related to Prenocephale and Pachycephalosaurus. Similarly, the 1998 study describing the partial skull MPM 8111 likewise proposed Stygimoloch was more derived than Stegoceras but earlier diverging than Prenocephale and Pachycephalosaurus.

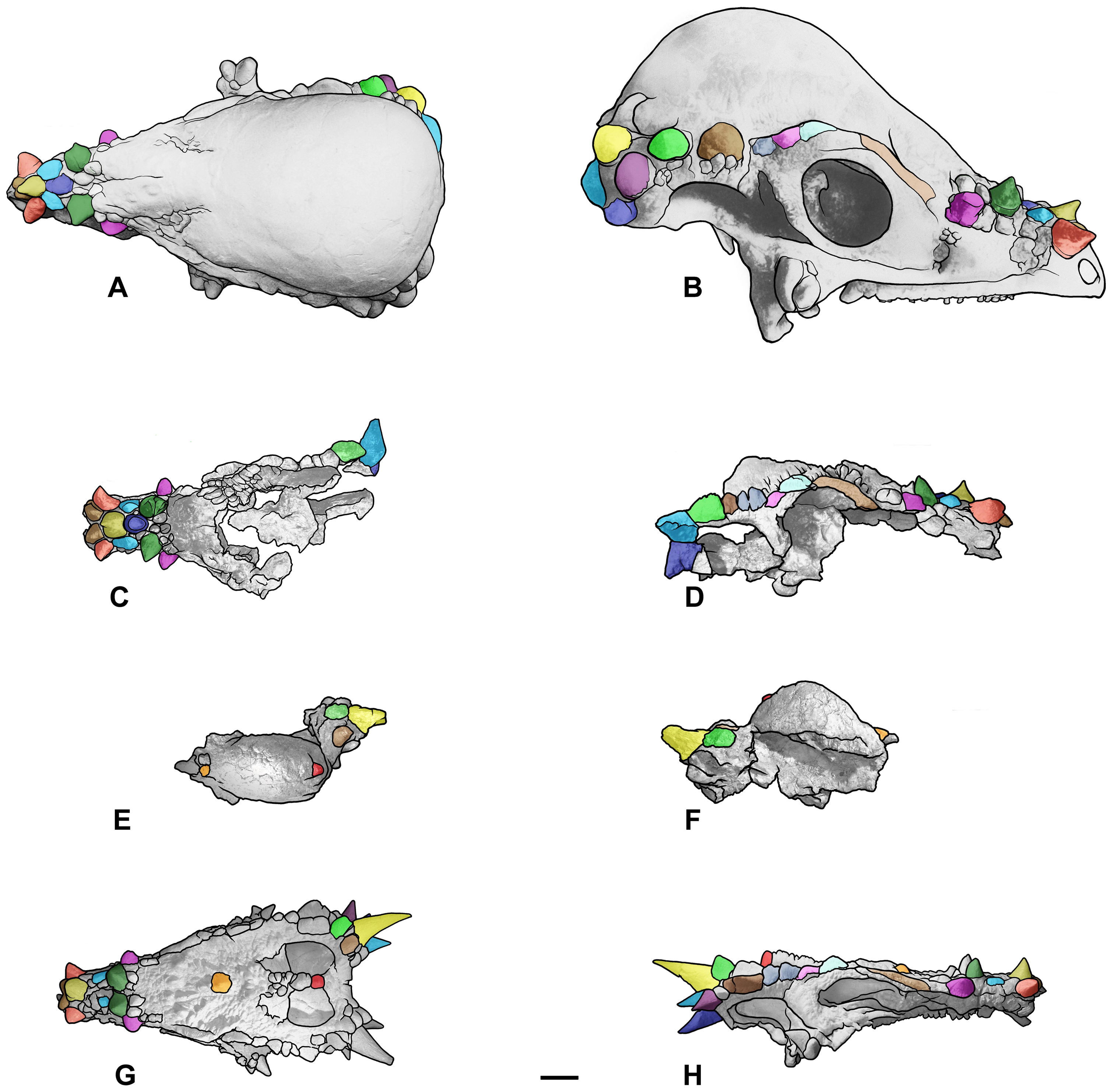
Skulls of Pachycephalosaurus (A-B), "Sandy" specimen (C-D), Stygimoloch (E-F), and Dracorex (G-H) arranged as a growth series, showing relative size

A phylogenetic analysis in a 2000 study by Paul Sereno instead found Stygimoloch to be the closest relative of Pachycephalosaurus. Sereno noted they shared clustered ornamentation on the left and right squamosals (rather than a continuous row of ornamentation across the squamosals) and highly ornamented elongate snouts. A 2003 study by Robert Sullivan supported this conclusion, and named the group Pachycephalosaurini to contain the two genera. A 2006 study, naming Dracorex, assigned it to Pachycephalosaurini as well and interpreted it as an evolutionary end state of dome reduction, with Stygimoloch representing an evolutionary shift from domes to spikes. Some studies have also found Alaskacephale to be a member of Pachycephalosaurini, closely related to Stygimoloch. Horner and Goodwin instead interpreted "Pachcephalosaurini" as growth stages of a single species rather than a diverse lineage of pachycephalosaurs. The result of a phylogenetic analysis by David Evans and colleagues in 2021 is shown below:

- - Psittacosaurus mongoliensis
  - - Yinlong downsi
    - Pachycephalosauria
      - Wannanosaurus yansiensis
      - Pachycephalosauridae
        - - Stegoceras novomexicanum
          - Stegoceras validum
          - Colepiocephale lambei
          - Hanssuesia sternbergi
        - Pachycephalosaurinae
          - Goyocephale lattimorei
          - - Homalocephale calathocercos
            - - Tylocephale gilmorei
              - - Foraminacephale brevis
                - - - Amtocephale gobiensis
                    - - Acrotholus audeti
                      - Prenocephale prenes
                      - - Sinocephale bexelli
                        - - Sphaerotholus goodwini
                          - - Sphaerotholus buchholtzae
                            - Sphaerotholus edmontonensis
                        - Pachycephalosaurini
                          - Alaskacephale gangloffi
                          - Pachycephalosaurus wyomingensis
                          - Stygimoloch spinifer

== See also ==
- Timeline of pachycephalosaur research
