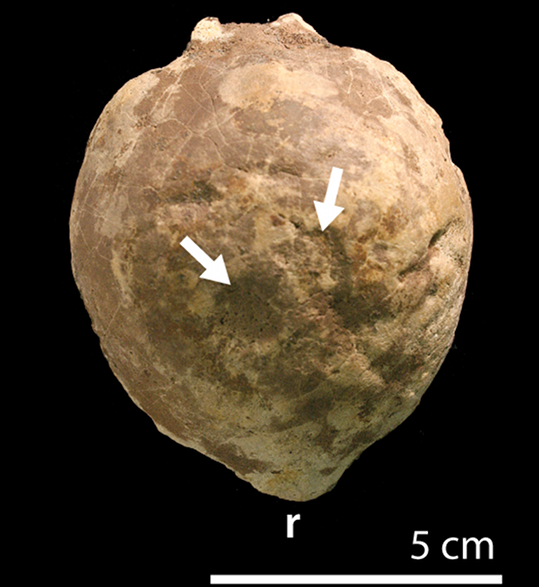
- S. buchholtzae specimen AMNH 0044

Scientific classification
- Kingdom: Animalia
- Phylum: Chordata
- Class: Reptilia
- Clade: Dinosauria
- Clade: †Ornithischia
- Clade: †Pachycephalosauria
- Family: †Pachycephalosauridae
- Subfamily: †Pachycephalosaurinae
- Genus: †Sphaerotholus; Williamson & Carr, 2002

Type species
- †Sphaerotholus goodwini Williamson & Carr, 2002

Other species
- †S. buchholtzae Williamson & Carr, 2002; †S. edmontonensis (Brown & Schlaikjer, 1943); †S. lyonsi Woodruff, Schott & Evans, 2023; †S. triregnum Woodruff, Schott & Evans, 2023

= Sphaerotholus =

Sphaerotholus Temporal range: Late Cretaceous, 76–66 Ma

Extinct genus of pachycephalosaur dinosaurs

Sphaerotholus is a genus of pachycephalosaurid dinosaur from the Upper Cretaceous of the western United States and Canada. To date, five species have been described: the type species, S. goodwini, from the Den-na-zin Member of the Kirtland Formation and possibly the Fossil Forest Member of the Fruitland Formation (Late Campanian) of San Juan County, New Mexico, USA; S. buchholtzae, from the Hell Creek Formation (Late Maastrichtian) of western Carter County, Montana, USA and the Frenchman Formation of Saskatchewan, Canada; S. edmontonensis, from the Horseshoe Canyon Formation of Alberta, Canada; S. lyonsi, from the Dinosaur Park Formation (Campanian) of Alberta, Canada; and S. triregnum from the Hell Creek Formation of Garfield County, Montana, USA.

== History of discovery ==
The etymology of Sphaerotholus is a combination of the Greek sphaira, meaning "ball", and tholos, meaning "dome", and is a reference to the characteristically dome-shaped pachycephalosaurian skull. The survival of Sphaerotholus from the Campanian of New Mexico to the end of the Maastrichtian of Montana demonstrates that this taxon had both a relatively long duration (approximately 7-8 million years) and a widespread distribution. Williamson and Carr, who first described the genus in 2002, diagnose it as follows: "Differs from all other pachycephalosaurids where known in the possession of a parietosquamosal bar that decreases in depth laterally as seen in caudal view and is bordered by a single row of nodes and one lateroventral corner node." Sphaerotholus is considered a highly derived pachycephalosaur.

== Species ==
=== Sphaerotholus goodwini ===
The holotype of the type species (NMMNH P-27403, New Mexico Museum of Natural History) consists of an incomplete skull lacking the facial and palatal elements. The species is diagnosed as follows: "Sphaerotholus which in caudal view possesses a parietosquamosal bar that reduces in depth laterally to a lesser extent than in S. buchholtzae and the parietal is reduced to a thin slip between the squamosals." The species name honors paleontologist Mark Goodwin for his work with pachycephalosaurian dinosaurs. It has been suggested that Stegoceras novomexicanum is a juvenile representative of this species, because the parietal shelf that morphologically distinguishes S. novomexicanum from Sphaerotholus goodwini disappears through growth in Stegoceras validum.

=== Sphaerotholus edmontonensis ===
Troodon edmontonensis was described by Brown and Schlaikjer in 1943 on the basis of three domes from the Horseshoe Canyon Formation of Alberta. Williamson and Carr considered the species to be invalid, but in 2010 Nicholas Longrich et al. created the novel combination Sphaerotholus edmontonensis that could be distinguished from S. goodwini by the paired hornlets on the back of the dome, and from S. buchholtzae by the elongate parietals. It was once considered a species of Stegoceras and was about the same size, reaching 2 m (6.6 ft) in length and 40 kg (88 lb) in body mass.

=== Sphaerotholus buchholtzae ===
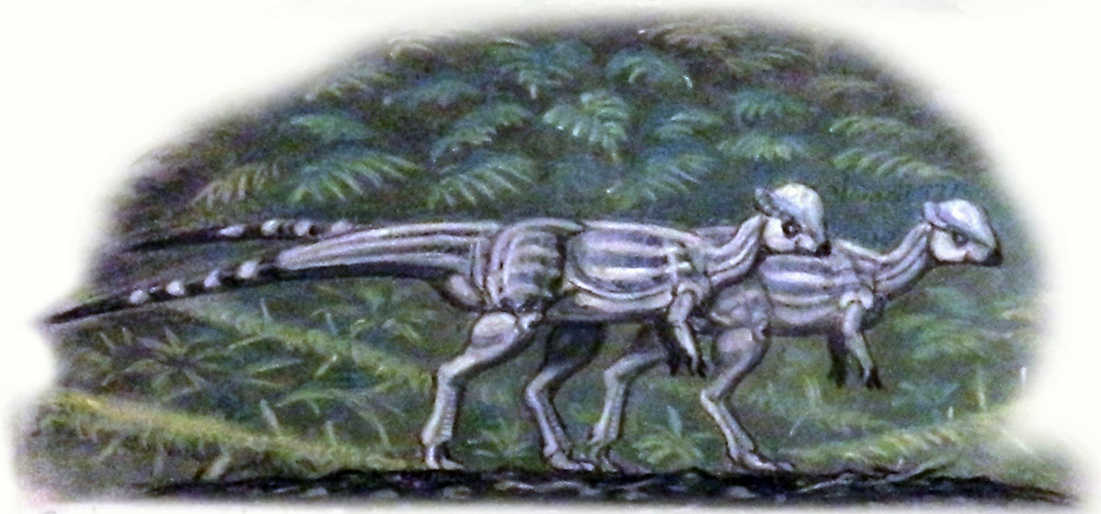
Restoration of a pair of S. buchholtzae

The holotype of S. buchholtzae (TMP 87.113.3) consists of an incomplete skull, found in the Hell Creek Formation. The species was diagnosed as having a parietal that is widely exposed between the squamosals and wide enough to bear parietosquamosal nodes, a shallower caudal margin of the parietosquamosal shelf, the lateral corner node is reduced in size and located above the ventral margin of the parietosquamosal bar, and the nodes in the lateral margin of the parietosquamosal shelf reduced on the squamosal and coalescing into a ridge on the postorbital. The specific name honors Emily A. Buchholtz for her extensive work with pachycephalosaurians.

Sullivan (2003) considered S. buchholtzae a junior synonym of Prenocephale edmontonensis (or Sphaerotholus edmontonensis). However, Mallon et al. (2015), in their description of a new S. buchholtzae specimen from the Frenchman Formation of Saskatchewan, Canada, noted that S. edmontonensis was distinct from S. buchholtzae based on comparative morphology and morphometrics. Additionally, a redescription of S. buchholtzae used geometric morphometrics to distinguish the two species.

=== Sphaerotholus lyonsi ===
Described by Woodruff, Schott, and Evans in 2023 based on an immature specimen. Lived in the Dinosaur Park Formation in Canada, c. 76 million years ago. It is characterized by a double row of small bony nodes along the back of its skull, as opposed to the single row of large nodes in S. goodwini, S. edmontonensis, and S. buchholtzae.

=== Sphaerotholus triregnum ===
Described by Woodruff, Schott, and Evans in 2023 based on a subadult specimen. Lived in the middle section of the Hell Creek Formation in Montana, USA. It is characterized by a triple row of small bony nodes along the back of its skull, as opposed to the single row of large nodes in S. buchholtzae and S. edmontonensis. It is named for the resemblance of its domed skull with a triple "crown"-like appearance of nodes to the Papal tiara or "Triregnum".

== Classification ==
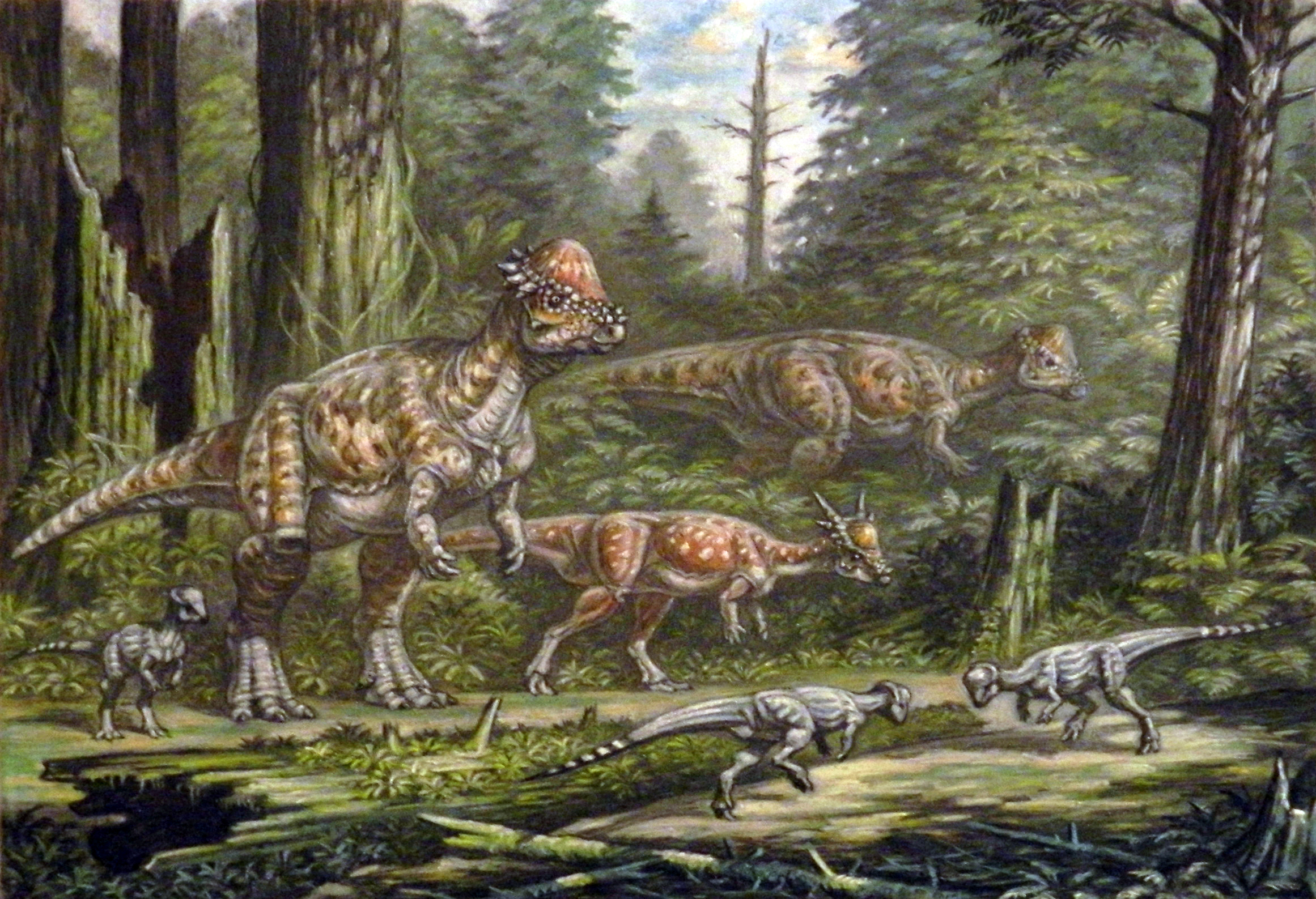
Sphaerotholus buchholtzae (small) fighting below larger pachycephalosaurs

In their 2023 description of S. lyonsi and S. triregnum, Woodruff, Schott & Evans analyzed the placement of the genus Sphaerotholus within the Pachycephalosauria. They recovered all proposed species of Sphaerotholus as a monophyletic group of derived pachycephalosaurines, as the sister taxon to the Pachycephalosaurini. The results of their phylogenetic analyses are shown in the cladogram below:

- Pachycephalosauria
  - Wannanosaurus
  - Pachycephalosauridae
    - - Hanssuesia
      - - Colepiocephale
        - Stegoceras spp.
    - Pachycephalosaurinae
      - Goyocephale
      - - Homalocephale
        - - Tylocephale
          - - Prenocephale
            - - Foraminacephale
              - - Amtocephale
                - - Acrotholus
                  - - Pachycephalosaurini
                      - Alaskacephale
                      - - Pachycephalosaurus
                        - 'Stygimoloch spinifer'
                    - - Sphaerotholus goodwini
                      - - - Sphaerotholus buchholtzae
                          - Sphaerotholus edmontonensis
                        - - Sphaerotholus triregnum
                          - Sphaerotholus lyonsi

== See also ==
- Timeline of pachycephalosaur research

== Sources ==
- Williamson T. D.; Carr T. E. (2002). "A new genus of highly derived pachycephalosaurian from western North America". Journal of Vertebrate Paleontology. 22 (4): 779–801. doi:10.1671/0272-4634(2002)022[0779:angodp]2.0.co;2.
