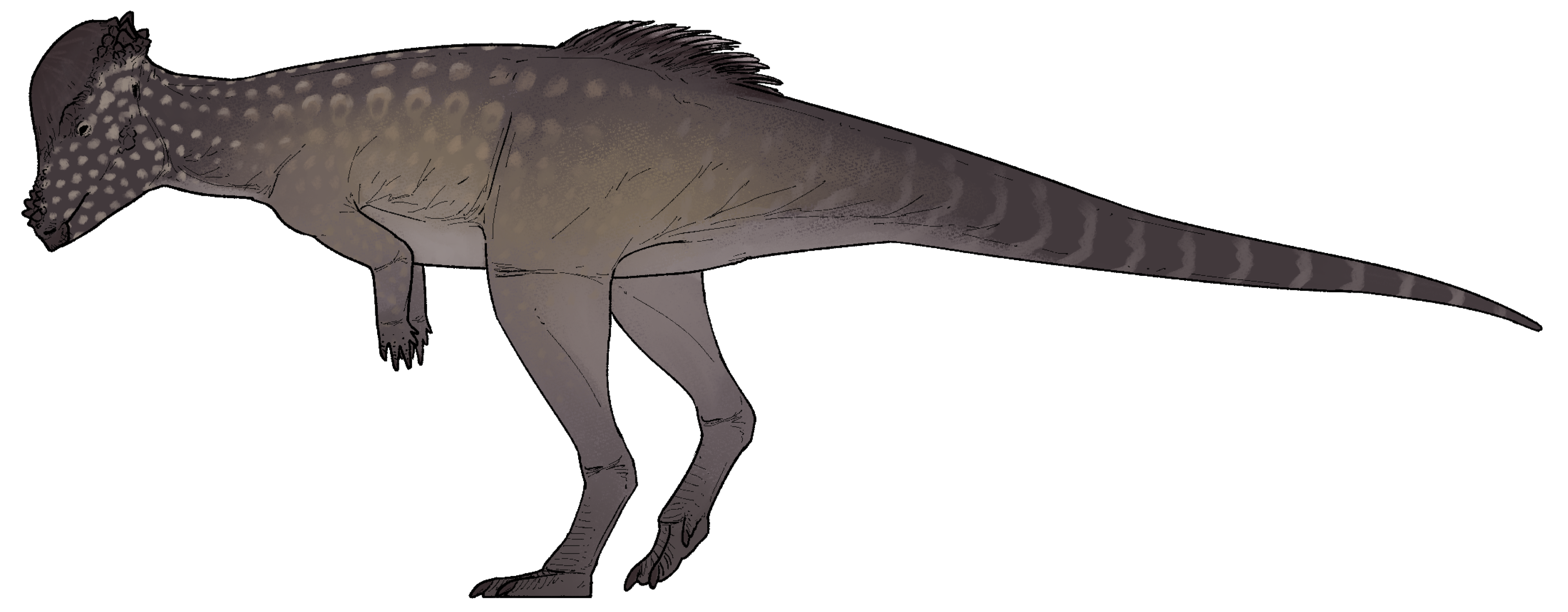
- Speculative life restoration

Scientific classification
- Kingdom: Animalia
- Phylum: Chordata
- Class: Reptilia
- Clade: Dinosauria
- Clade: †Ornithischia
- Clade: †Pachycephalosauria
- Family: †Pachycephalosauridae
- Genus: †Alaskacephale; Sullivan, 2006
- Species: †A. gangloffi

Binomial name
- †Alaskacephale gangloffi Sullivan, 2006

= Alaskacephale =

Alaskacephale Temporal range: early Maastrichtian, 70–69 Ma

Extinct genus of dinosaurs

Alaskacephale is an extinct genus of pachycephalosaurid, a group of dome-headed, herbivorous ornithischian dinosaurs, that lived during the Maastrichtian stage of the Late Cretaceous period in what is now northern Alaska. The genus is one of the few known Arctic dinosaurs and was found in the Prince Creek Formation, which preserves a menagerie of fossils. The only known specimen, a squamosal bone, was found in 1999 and later described in 2005. However, Alaskacephale was not formally named until the next year.

Alaskacephale, due to the lack of fossil remains, is poorly known. Despite this, the presence of bony protuberances from the skull prove that it was a pachycephalosaur. Later phylogenetic analyses suggest it was a close relative of Pachycephalosaurus. However, Alaskacephale is distinguished from other genera by the two rows of nodules found along the squamosal.

The Prince Creek Formation bears a variety of fossils, many of them similar to other previously known Laramidian taxa. Alaskacephale coexisted with dinosaurs like the ceratopsian Pachyrhinosaurus, ornithopod Edmontosaurus, and tyrannosaurid Nanuqsaurus in addition to mammals like Unnuakomys.

== Discovery and naming ==
In 1999 during an expedition by the University of Alaska, an isolated pachycephalosaur squamosal was unearthed from bluffs on the bank of the Colville River in North Slope Borough, Alaska. Strata (rock layers) deriving from this area come from the latest Campanian-aged (72-71 mya) Prince Creek Formation. The fossil was then deposited in the University of Alaska Museum and described in 2005 by Roland Gangloff and colleagues as belonging to a pachycephalosaurine closely related to, and possibly, Pachycephalosaurus. However, the next year paleontologist Robert Sullivan described it as a new genus and species, Alaskacephale gangloffi. The genus name comes from Alaska, the state the holotype (name-bearing specimen) was found in, and cephale, from the Greek kephale meaning "head". Its species name is in honor of Gangloff, who published the earlier 2005 description.

== Description ==
The dimensions of the holotype suggest that A. gangloffi was about half the size of Pachycephalosaurus wyomingensis or three-quarters the size of Prenocephale, and about the same size as Sphaerotholus and Foraminacephale. The latter measured 1.5 metres (4.9 ft) long and 10 kilograms (22 lb) in weight. This would make Alaskacephale one of the smaller known pachycephalosaurs. No postcranial fossils belonging to Alaskacephale have been found, though there are well-preserved skeletons of the related Stegoceras, Homalocephale, and Prenocephale. Based on these taxa, Alaskacephale had a short neck, tiny forelimbs, long hindlimbs, and a thick, rodlike tail for balance. The neck was slender and U-shaped, and held in a curved posture, attaching at the occipital condyle on the back of the skull. Its spinal column bore firm connections between the vertebrae that were reinforced by ossified tendons. Its arms were lightly-built and slender ending in a hand with five fingers. The limbs terminated in a pes with three toes, the middle being the longest, all of which had unguals.

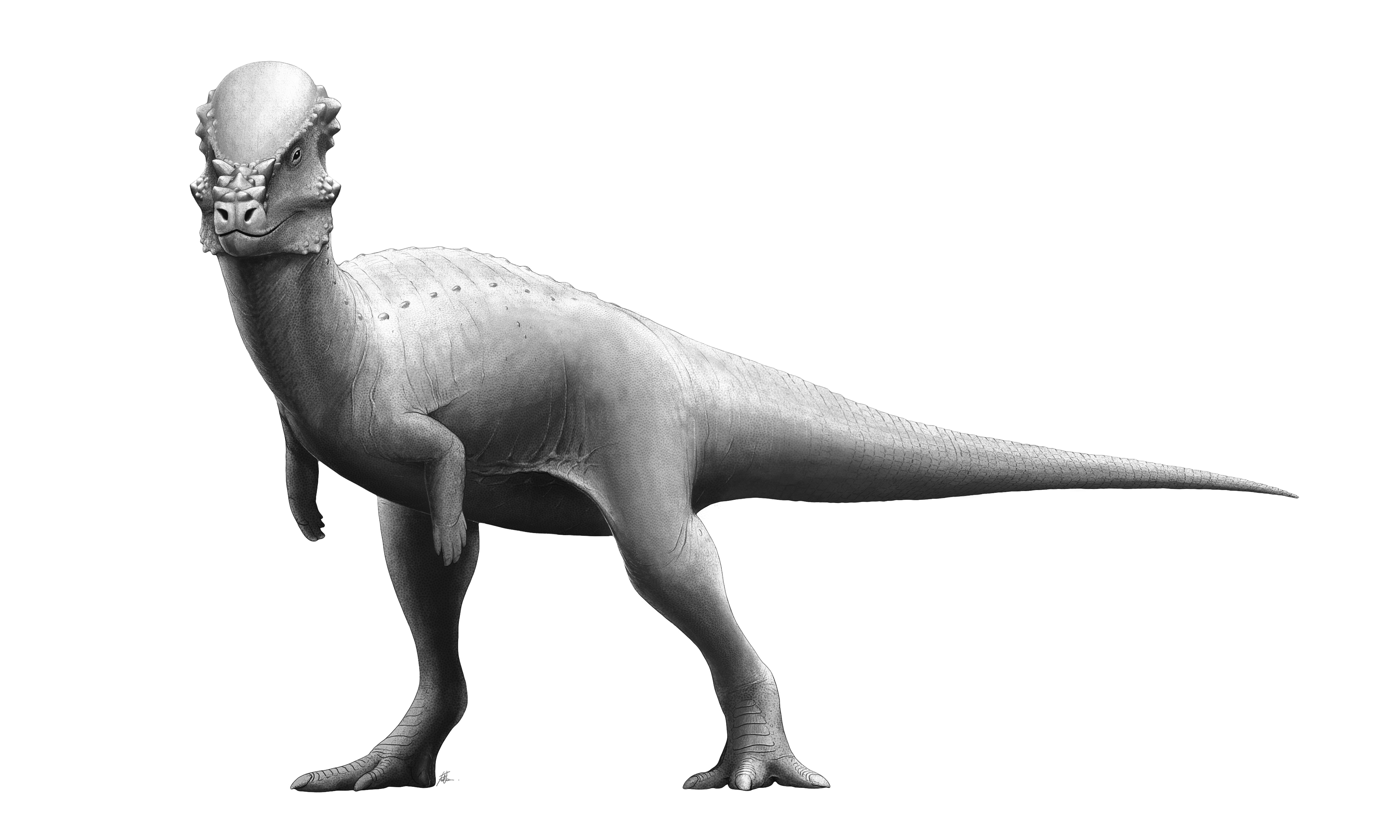
Life restoration of the close relative Pachycephalosaurus

The only known specimen consists of a skull fragment containing a nearly complete left squamosal, much of the left posterior supraorbital, a fragment of the quadrate, and sections of the postorbital. Alaskacephale is distinguished from other pachycephalosaurs by the presence of two divergent rows of bony nodes along the squamosal. All of these nodes have polygonal bases, unlike the rounded nodules in Pachycephalosaurus, with distinct grooves separating them. The squamosal has twelve of these nodes, the largest of which is at the base of the parietal. Along the quadrate-squamosal articulation, a cluster of nodes is present on the squamosal, with one large center node and three smaller ones surrounding it. The holotype was described as having an interdigitated suture at the base of the quadrate, as in Pachycephalosaurus, by Gangloff and colleague's description. However, Sullivan opined that this "suture" is instead a breakage point in quadrates of both Alaskacephale and Pachycephalosaurus, so it could not be used to unite the two taxa. Part of the dome is preserved, with the thickest point being 4.05 centimetres (1.59 in) thick, whereas the nuccal shelf (a curved shelf at the back of the skull) is only 1.50 centimetres (0.59 in) thick. The back of the dome bears several pits (in bone), as in other pachycephalosaurs.

== Classification ==
Alaskacephale was a member of the group Pachycephalosauria, a family of thick-skulled, herbivorous, bipedal dinosaurs that lived during the Cretaceous period in Asia and North America. The last pachycephalosaurs went extinct during the Cretaceous-Paleogene extinction event, the last surviving genus being Pachycephalosaurus itself. However, a 2020 cladistic analysis recovered the heterodontosaurids as an early branch of the group, which extend the age of pachycephalosaurs as far back as the Early Jurassic. Currently, pachycephalosaurs are recognized as being part of the larger group Marginocephalia which encompasses it and the gigantic, horned ceratopsians.

Within Pachycephalosaurinae, Alaskacephale likely belongs to the tribe Pachycephalosaurini, which contains Alaskacephale, Pachycephalosaurus, and, according to some phylogenetic analyses, Stygimoloch, Dracorex, and Sphaerotholus. Pachycephalosauria originated in Asia but later colonized North America. The Asian members of this clade are more basal compared to the North American genera, which bear more derived characteristics. Pachycephalosaurini is the most advanced group in Pachycephalosauria and is made up of North American members.

Below is a cladogram from Evans et al., 2021.

- - Psittacosaurus mongoliensis
  - - Yinlong downsi
    - Pachycephalosauria
      - Wannanosaurus yansiensis
      - Pachycephalosauridae
        - - Stegoceras novomexicanum
          - Stegoceras validum
          - Colepiocephale lambei
          - Hanssuesia sternbergi
        - Pachycephalosaurinae
          - Goyocephale lattimorei
          - - Homalocephale calathocercos
            - - Tylocephale gilmorei
              - - Foraminacephale brevis
                - - - Amtocephale gobiensis
                    - - Acrotholus audeti
                      - Prenocephale prenes
                      - - Sinocephale bexelli
                        - - Sphaerotholus goodwini
                          - - Sphaerotholus buchholtzae
                            - Sphaerotholus edmontonensis
                        - - Alaskacephale gangloffi
                          - Pachycephalosaurus wyomingensis
                          - Stygimoloch spinifer

A phylogenetic analysis in a 2023 study recovered Alaskacephale as a sister taxon of Goyocephale and the two genera formed a clade with Homalocephale, while Pachycephalosaurus formed a separate clade with Sphaerotholus.

== Paleoenvironment ==
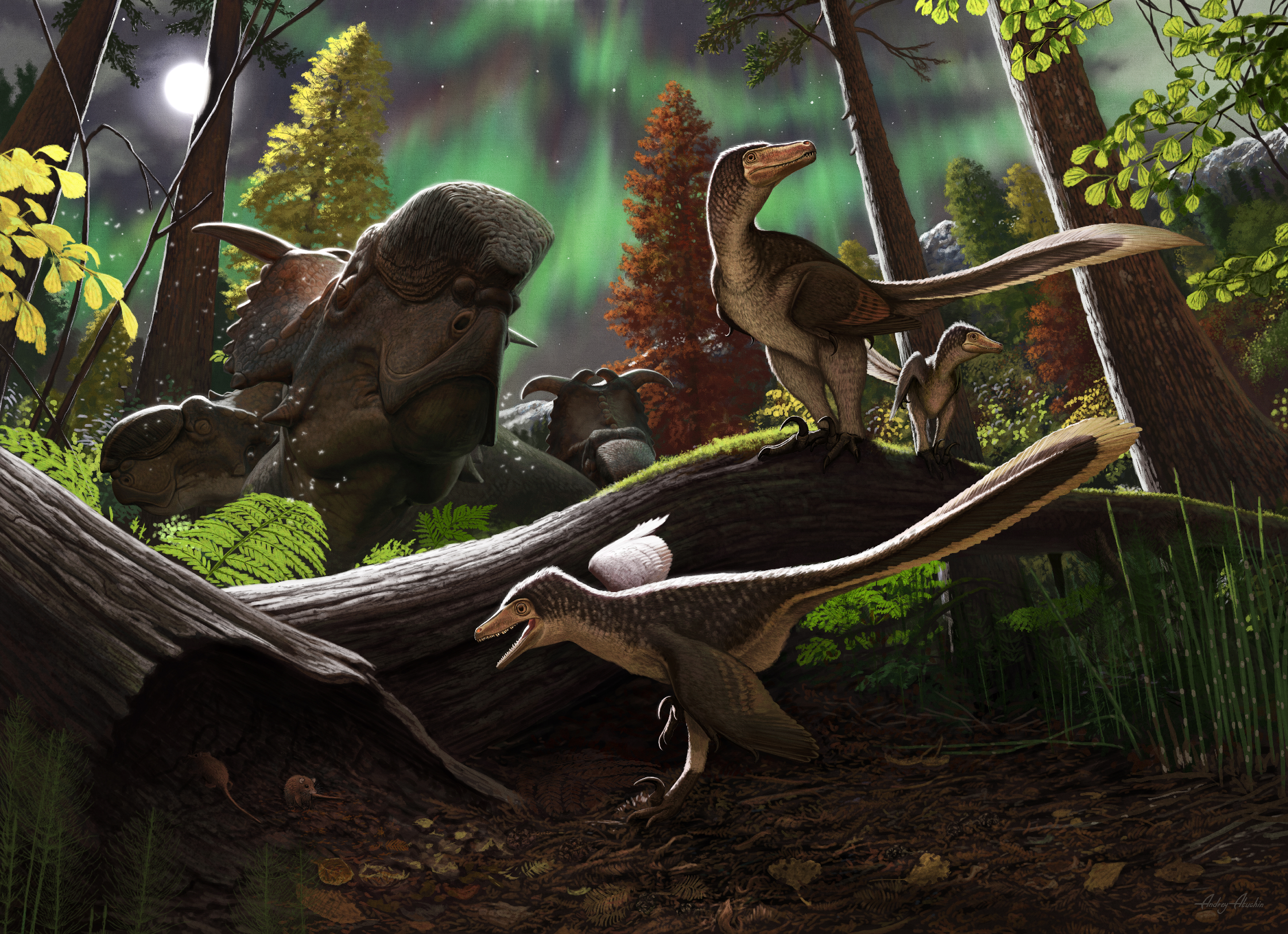
A herd of Pachyrhinosaurus resting next to contemporaneous paleofauna from the Prince Creek Formation

Alaskacephale lived alongside many other dinosaurs during latest interval of the Campanian stage. Having resided at an estimated 80°–85°N paleolatitude, the area Alaskacephale thrived in experienced climatic extremes unlike that experienced by most other dinosaurs. The temperature of this Northern environment would've ranged from around 10 to 12 °C during the warmer months and about −2 °C ± 3.9 °C during the colder months. As well as this, the environment would have faced 120 days of continuous low-light conditions during the Winter. In contrast to the contemporary large herbivores Edmontosaurus and Pachyrhinosaurus, which preferred coastal lowland and upland environments respectively, Nanuqsaurus appears to have been fairly ubiquitous throughout the Prince Creek landscape.

Other animals that lived alongside Alaskacephale include the following: unnamed leptoceratopsid, the hadrosaurid Edmontosaurus (similar to E. regalis), an unnamed lambeosaurine, an unnamed thescelosaurine (mentioned to be similar to Parkosaurus and Thescelosaurus), an unnamed orodromine (mentioned to be similar to Orodromeus), the ceratopsid Pachyrhinosaurus perotorum, the tyrannosaurid Nanuqsaurus, a large troodontid referred to the dubious genus Troodon, the dromaeosaurid Dromaeosaurus, the dromaeosaurid Richardoestesia (similar to R. isosceles), an unnamed saurornitholestine, an unnamed ornithomimosaur, and multiple avialans. As well as this, several mammals, including the metatherian Unnuakomys, the eutherian Gypsonictops, both an unnamed and named multituberculate, the latter being Cimolodon, and finally an indeterminate marsupial. Interestingly, due to the cooler conditions of this habitat, many otherwise common ectothermic clades lack representation entirely in the Prince Creek Formation, suggesting that all the animals that did thrive in these extreme latitudes were indeed endotherms to some degree.

== See also ==
- Timeline of pachycephalosaur research
