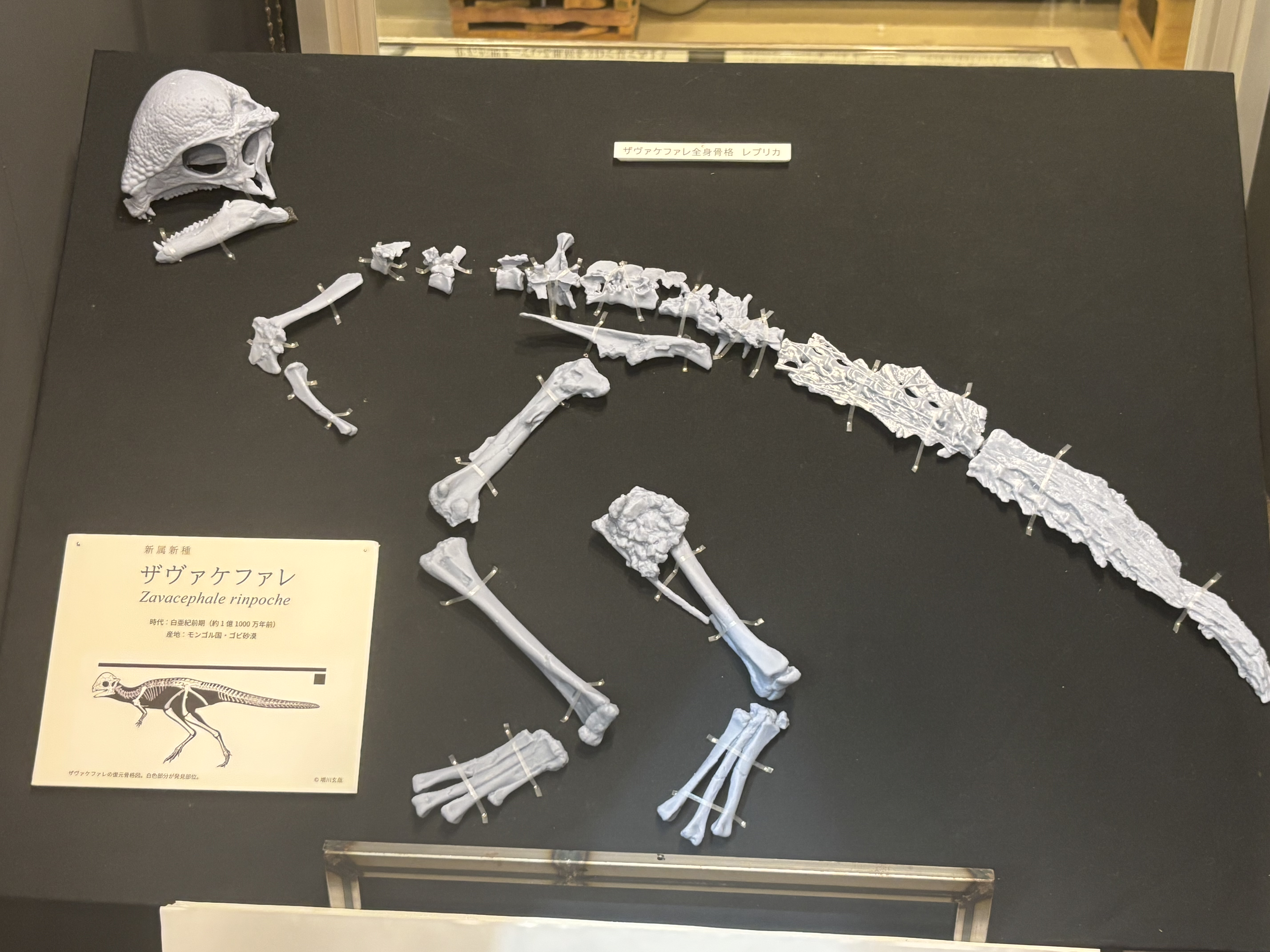
- Replica of the holotype skeleton

Scientific classification
- Kingdom: Animalia
- Phylum: Chordata
- Class: Reptilia
- Clade: Dinosauria
- Clade: †Ornithischia
- Clade: †Marginocephalia
- Clade: †Pachycephalosauria
- Genus: †Zavacephale; Chinzorig et al., 2025
- Species: †Z. rinpoche

Binomial name
- †Zavacephale rinpoche Chinzorig et al., 2025

= Zavacephale =

Zavacephale Temporal range: Early Cretaceous, Aptian–Albian

Genus of pachycephalosaurian dinosaurs

Zavacephale (meaning "origin head") is an extinct genus of pachycephalosaurian dinosaurs known from the Early Cretaceous Khuren Dukh Formation of Mongolia. The genus contains a single species, Zavacephale rinpoche, known from a partial articulated skeleton including a nearly complete skull. It is both the oldest definitive pachycephalosaur known, as well as the most complete. Its skull bears a well-developed dome structure, as seen in most members of the clade.

== Discovery and naming ==
The Zavacephale holotype specimen, MPC-D 100/1209, was discovered in 2019 outcrops of the Khuren Dukh Formation in the Eastern Gobi Basin in Dundgobi Province, Mongolia. It was subsequently accessioned at the Institute of Paleontology (Mongolian Academy of Sciences) where it was prepared over the following years. The skeleton, which was found in partial articulation, is 54% complete based on element count, making it the most complete pachycephalosaur described. The specimen includes regions of the body not scientifically described in any other pachycephalosaur, including bones of the hand, a gastrolith mass, and a complete tail covered in ossified tendons. The skeleton also includes a complete skull and mandible, a scapulocoracoid, dorsal vertebrae, the sacrum, and most of the pelvic girdle and hindlimbs. The fossil material was reported in conference abstracts in 2023 before its formal description.

In September 2025, Tsogtbaatar Chinzorig and colleagues described Zavacephale rinpoche as a new genus and species of pachycephalosaurs based on these fossil remains. The generic name, Zavacephale, combines the Tibetan word zava meaning "root" or "origin" with the Greek kephale, meaning "head", referencing the basal position of the taxon within Pachycephalosauria. The specific name, rinpoche, is a Tibetan word meaning "precious one", alluding to the fact that the domed skull was found exposed in the rock outcrop, reminiscent of a cabochon gemstone.

== Description ==
Size compared to a human

The Zavacephale holotype belongs to an immature individual that was actively growing when it died, meaning it had not yet reached its full body size. This was determined based on the lack of fusion at the neurocentral sutures and between the scapula and coracoid, in addition to the lack of an external fundamental system and presence of limited remodelling of the tibia cortex. The skeleton is about 1 metre (3.3 ft) long, and the animal likely weighed around 5.85 kilograms (12.9 lb) in life. Unlike more derived domed pachycephalosaurs, the frontoparietal dome was made up of primarily the frontal, with very little involvement of the parietal bone. The ossified tendons that covered the tail vertebrae did not yet form a "caudal basket" as seen in more derived pachycephalosaurs.

== Classification ==
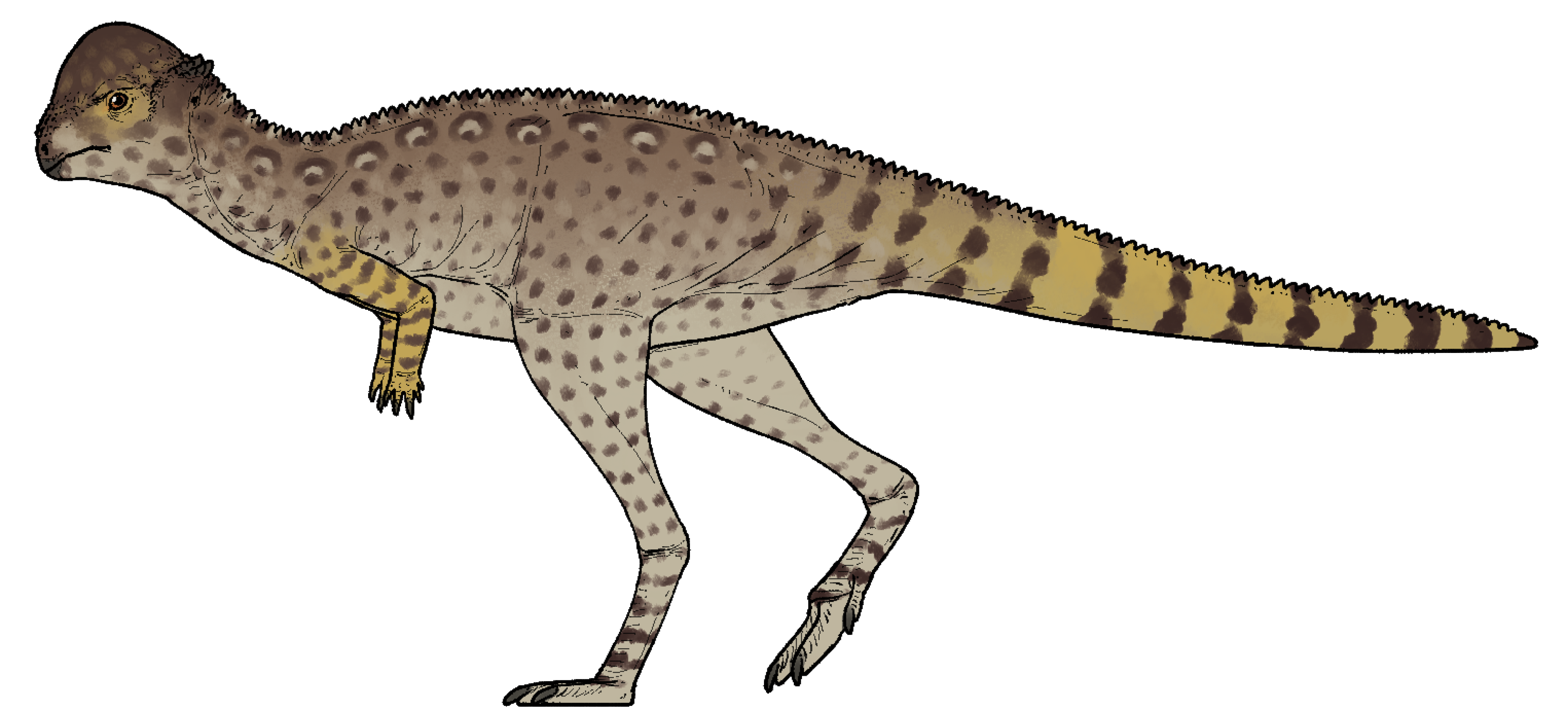
Speculative life restoration

To test the relationships and affinities of Zavacephale, Chinzorig et al. (2025) compiled a new phylogenetic matrix derived from several past analyses. They recovered Zavacephale as a very basal member of the Pachycephalosauria, diverging after Wannanosaurus. As such, it is the sister taxon to all other pachycephalosaurs. These results are displayed in the cladogram below, with node names following Madzia et al. (2021):

- Pachycephalosauria
  - Wannanosaurus yansiensis
  - - Zavacephale rinpoche
    - - Colepiocephale lambei
      - Pachycephalosauridae
        - - Amtocephale gobiensis
          - - Foraminacephale brevis
            - Stegoceras validum
        - Pachycephalosaurinae
          - Tylocephale gilmorei
          - - - Alaskacephale gangloffi
              - - Acrotholus audeti
                - Prenocephale prenes
            - - - Goyocephale lattimorei
                - Homalocephale calathocercos
              - - Sinocephale bexelli
                - - Sphaerotholus goodwini
                  - Pachycephalosaurini
                    - Platytholus clemensi
                    - - - Sphaerotholus lyonsi
                        - Sphaerotholus triregnum
                      - - Sphaerotholus buchholtzae
                        - Pachycephalosaurus wyomingensis

== Paleoenvironment ==
Zavacephale is known from the upper portion of the lower Khuren Dukh Formation, which dates to around the Aptian to Albian ages of the early Cretaceous period. As such, it predates all other known pachycephalosaurs, which are restricted to the Late Cretaceous. Other dinosaurs named from the formation include the hadrosauroid ornithopods Altirhinus and Choyrodon and the ornithomimosaur theropod Harpymimus. Choristoderes, turtles, and fish have also been described from the formation.
