= Platytholus =

Platytholus Temporal range: Late Cretaceous, Maastrichtian
- Skeletal diagram of Platytholus

Scientific classification
- Kingdom: Animalia
- Phylum: Chordata
- Class: Reptilia
- Clade: Dinosauria
- Clade: †Ornithischia
- Clade: †Pachycephalosauria
- Family: †Pachycephalosauridae
- Subfamily: †Pachycephalosaurinae
- Genus: †Platytholus; Horner, Goodwin & Evans, 2023
- Species: †P. clemensi

Binomial name
- †Platytholus clemensi Horner, Goodwin & Evans, 2023

Genus of dinosaurs

Platytholus is an extinct genus of pachycephalosaurid (dome-headed dinosaur) from the Late Cretaceous (Maastrichtian) Hell Creek Formation of the United States. The genus contains a single species, P. clemensi, known from a partial skull. It was a medium-sized pachycephalosaur, living alongside its smaller relative Sphaerotholus and larger relative Pachycephalosaurus. Compared to other pachycephalosaurs, its dome had a distinct low and broad rectangular shape and unique roof-tile like ornamentation along its sides. Though it has been found as a potential relative of Prenocephale, its phylogenetic position remains uncertain due to the fragmentary nature of the only known specimen.

== Discovery and naming ==
The Platytholus holotype specimen, MOR 2915, was discovered by paleontologist Jack Horner during the early 2000s in sediments of the Hell Creek Formation, dated to the latest Maastrichtian age of the late Cretaceous period, in Garfield County, Montana. The specimen consists of a partial skull, preserving the cranial dome characteristic of pachycephalosaurs as formed by the frontal and parietal bones as well as the surrounding supraorbital, postorbital, and squamosal bones. Based on the incorporation of the developed state of the dome and the extensive fusion within the skull, it is thought to be from an adult animal.

In 2023, Horner, Mark B. Goodwin and Evans described the specimen as Platytholus clemensi, a new genus and species of pachycephalosaurid. The generic name, "Platytholus", combines the Latinised Greek "platys", meaning "flattened", "wide", or "broad", and "tholos", meaning a "small domed hill". The specific name, "clemensi", honors American paleontologist William A. Clemens Jr.

== Description ==
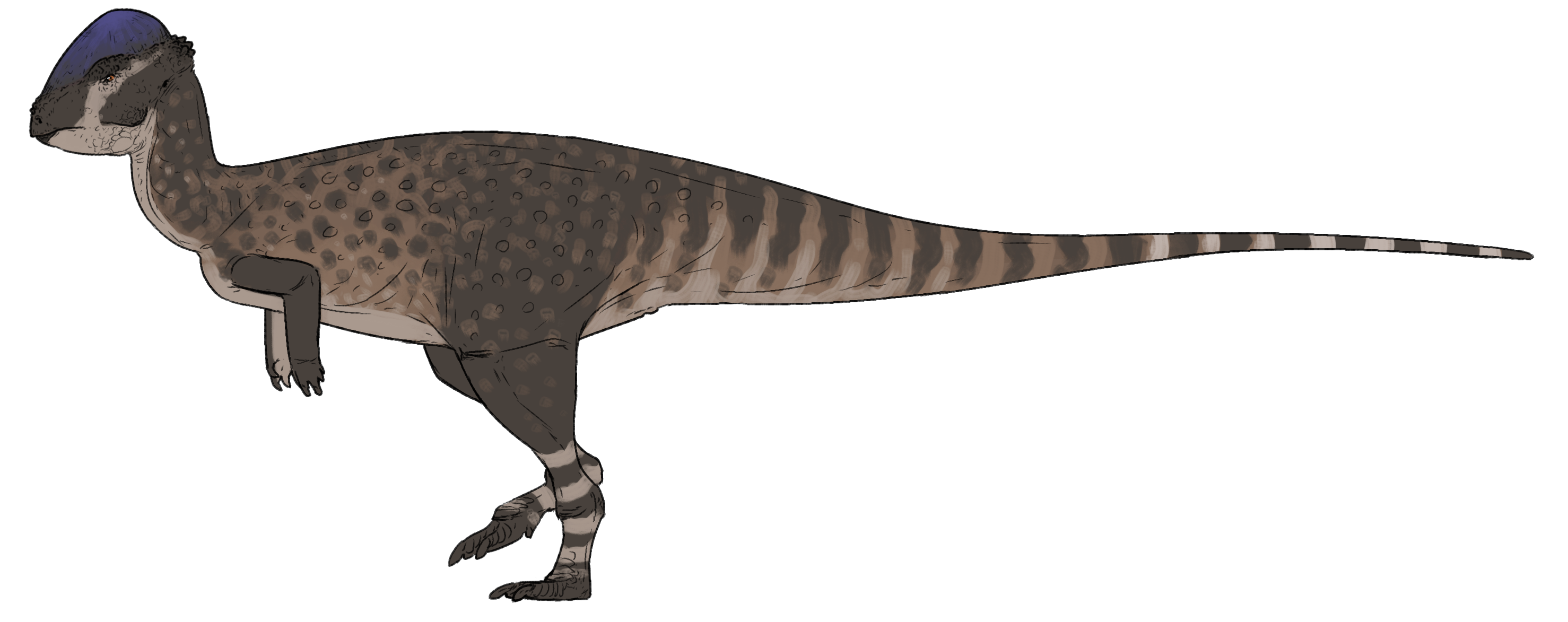
Life restoration

As a pachycephalosaur, Platytholus would have been a small bipedal animal with a rounded "dome" structure covering much of the skull and formed of solid bone. It was a medium sized pachycephalosaur, intermediate in size between the smaller Sphaerotholus and larger Pachycephalosaurus it lived alongside. The dome of the Platytholus holotype was approximately 21 centimetres (8.3 in) long and 7.8 centimetres (3.1 in) thick (measured from the roof of the braincase, with that of Sphaerotholus up to 11.2 centimetres (4.4 in) long and 5.5 centimetres (2.2 in) thick while those of Pachycephalosaurus could be more than 30 centimetres (12 in) long and 20 centimetres (0.66 ft) thick.

Compared to other pachycephalosaurs, Platytholus had a uniquely low and broad dome, lacking the strong arching shape seen in its relatives. As seen from above, this dome has a strongly rectangular rather than rounded or oval shape. In addition to the frontal and parietal bones that form of the core of the dome in pachycephalosaurs, the supraorbital (above the eyes) and postorbital (above and behind the eyes) bones to the side of the frontals and parietals were incorporated into the dome. In related taxa such as Prenocephale, these side elements possess distinct rounded lobes, but in Playthtolus they seamlessly contribute to the shape of the dome.

Pronounced ornamental nodes are absent along the rim of the orbit (eye socket). Instead, the sides of the supraorbitals and postorbitals are littered with small and overlapping roof tile-like ornamentation with a compressed shape and sharp tips, unique to Playthtolus. A large recessed area (a depression) exists on each side between the supraorbitals and the postorbitals, covered in an especially high density of the roof tile ornamentation. To the rear of the skull, the squamosal bones that form much of the back edge are bisected by a posterior V-shaped projection of the parietal. On the holotype the squamosals are poorly preserved, and the posterior rim that bears prominent ornamentation in pachycephalosaurs is unknown. The roof tile ornamentation from the sides of the dome continues onto the top surface of the squamosal, however.

== Classification ==
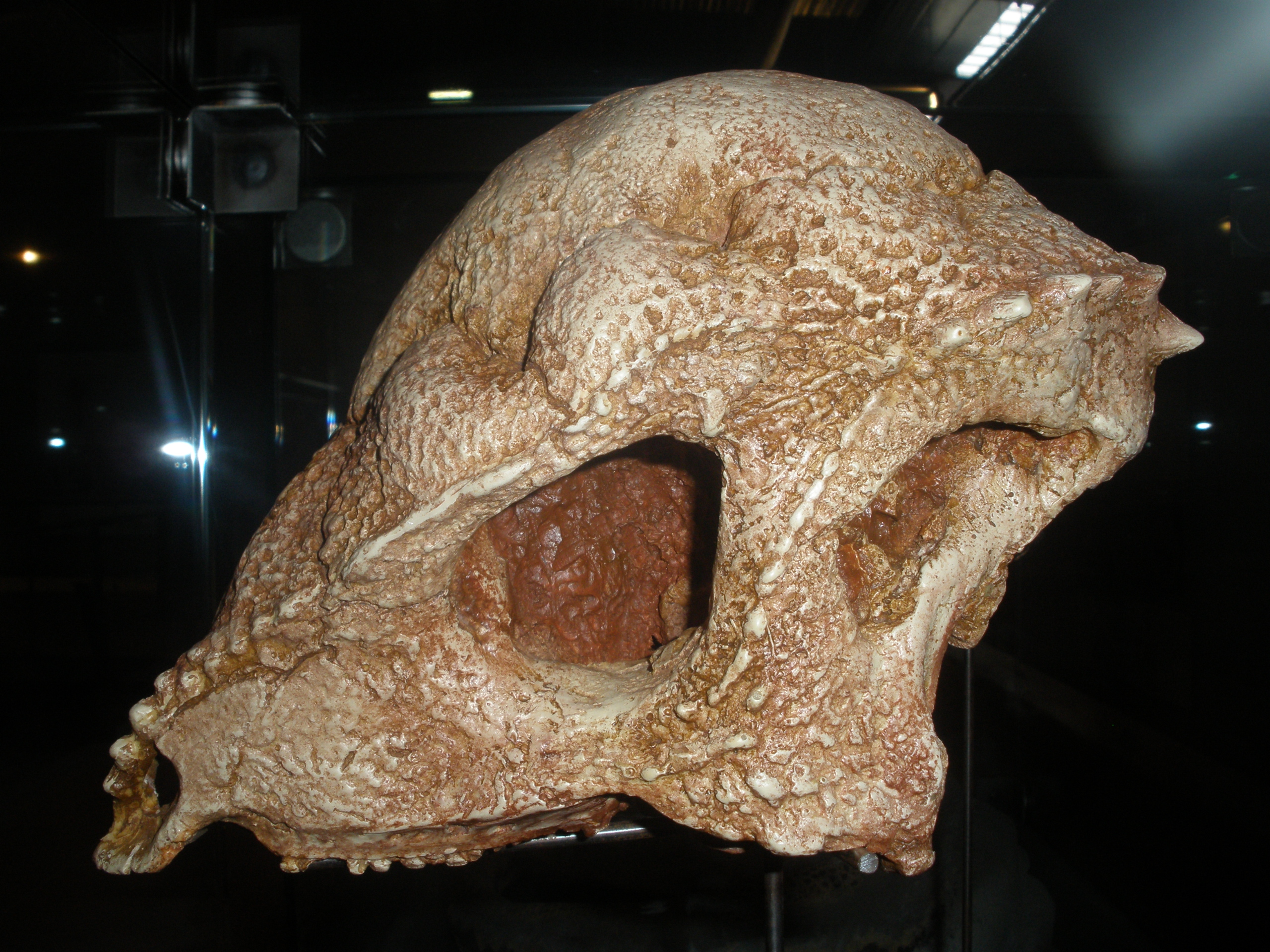
Skull of the related Prenocephale, which has a taller dome and possesses supraorbital lobes lacking in Platytholus

Horner and colleagues performed a phylogenetic analysis recovered Platytholus as a derived pachycephalosaur within the clade Pachycephalosaurinae. It was found nested in a clade including Prenocephale and Acrotholus. They noted, however, that its phylogenetic position was only weakly supported and limited by the squamosal ornamentation being unpreserved. The highly uncertain placement of Platytholus in Pachycephalosauridae was noted has been noted by later studies. A cladogram of the 2023 results is shown below:

- Pachycephalosauria
  - Wannanosaurus
  - Pachycephalosauridae
    - - Hanssuesia
      - Colepiocephale
      - Stegoceras
    - Pachycephalosaurinae
      - Goyocephale
      - - Homalocephale
        - - Tylocephale
          - - Foraminacephale
            - - Amtocephale
              - - - - Prenocephale
                    - Acrotholus
                    - Platytholus
                  - - Sphaerotholus edmontonensis
                    - Sphaerotholus goodwini
                    - Sphaerotholus buchholtzae
                    - Pachycephalosaurus
                    - Alaskacephale
