= Teresa Maryańska =

Polish paleontologist (1937–2019)

- Born: 27 May 1937; Warsaw
- Died: 3 October 2019 (aged 82); Warsaw
- Known for: Taxonomy and analysis of duck-billed dinosaurs
- Scientific career
- Fields: Paleontology
- Institutions: Museum of the Earth of the Polish Academy of Sciences

Teresa Maryańska (27 May 1937 – 3 October 2019) was a Polish paleontologist who specialized in Mongolian dinosaurs, particularly pachycephalosaurians and ankylosaurians. She was considered not only as one of Poland's but also one of the world's leading experts on dinosaurs.

== Career ==
Initially, Teresa's studies were regarding invertebrate paleontology. However, she became an active and important member of the 1964, 1965, 1970, and 1971 Polish–Mongolian expeditions to the Gobi Desert, where she led the former as vice-leader. These expeditions shifted her focus away from invertebrates towards the vertebrate dinosaurs found within the Gobi Desert. Along with Halszka Osmólska,Maryanska is credited with the descriptions of more than a dozen new species and for their work on the taxonomy and analysis of duck-billed dinosaurs. Together they also took part in many smaller expeditions into the Gobi and completed research projects at the Geological Institute of the Mongolian Academy of Sciences in Ulaanbaatar.

In 1974, Maryanska and Halszka Osmólska were among the first "women to describe new kinds of dinosaurs".

Since 1961, Maryańska was affiliated with the Muzeum Ziemi of the Polska Akademia Nauk and was vice-director there from 1976 to 2006, when she retired.

Some of the dinosaurs she described:

- Homalocephale (1974), with Halszka Osmólska
- Prenocephale (1974), with Halszka Osmólska
- Tylocephale (1974), with Halszka Osmólska
- Pachycephalosauria (1974), with Halszka Osmólska
- Bagaceratops (1975), with Halszka Osmólska
- Saichania (1977)
- Tarchia (1977)
- Barsboldia (1981), with Halszka Osmólska
- Goyocephale (1982), with Halszka Osmólska and Altangerel Perle

Alan Feduccia notes that Maryanska and her colleagues (Osmólska and Wolsan) produced in 2002 the "most impressive analysis of the oviraptorosaurs".

Amongst her many publications are contributions to three chapters of the 2nd edition of The Dinosauria: the chapters on the Therizinosauroidea, the Ankylosauria and on the Pachycephalosauria.

She was a member of the Scientific Council of the Institute of Paleobiology of the Polish Academy of Sciences in Warsaw from 1981 to 2006.

== Personal life and demise ==
Maryańska was known for her independent nature, wisdom, and her fondness for literature.

She died on 3 October 2019 at age 82 in Warsaw, Poland.

== Selected publications ==
=== Books ===
- T. Maryańska (1970). O gadach bez sensacji. Wydawnictwa Geologiczne.

=== Articles ===
- T. Maryańska (1970). Remains of armoured dinosaurs from the uppermost Cretaceous in Nemegt Basin, Gobi Desert. Palaeontologia Polonica 21:23-32.
- T. Maryańska (1971). New data on the skull of Pinacosaurus grangeri (Ankylosauria). Palaeontologia Polonica 25:45-53.
- T. Maryańska and H. Osmólska (1974). Pachycephalosauria, a new suborder of ornithischian dinosaurs. Palaeontologia Polonica 30:45-102.
- T. Maryańska and H. Osmólska (1975). Protoceratopsidae (Dinosauria) of Asia. Palaeontologica Polonica 33:133-181.
- T. Maryańska (1977). Ankylosauridae (Dinosauria) from Mongolia. Palaeontologia Polonica 37:85-151.
- T. Maryańska and H. Osmólska (1981). First lambeosaurine dinosaur from the Nemegt Formation, Upper Cretaceous, Mongolia. Acta Palaeontologica Polonica 26(3-1):243-255.
- T. Maryańska and H. Osmólska (1981). Cranial anatomy of Saurolophus angustirostris with comments on the Asian Hadrosauridae (Dinosauria). Palaeontologia Polonica 42:5-24.
- A. Perle, T. Maryańska, and H. Osmólska (1982). Goyocephale lattimorei gen. et sp. n., a new flat-headed pachycephalosaur (Ornithischia, Dinosauria) from the Upper Cretaceous of Mongolia. Acta Palaeontologica Polonica 27(1-4):115-127.
- T. Maryańska and H. Osmólska (1984). Postcranial anatomy of Saurolophus angustirostris with comments on other hadrosaurs. Palaeontologia Polonica 46:119-141.
- T. Maryańska and H. Osmólska (1985). On ornithischian phylogeny. Acta Palaeontologica Polonica 30(3-4):137-149.
- T. Maryańska (1990). Pachycephalosauria. In: D.B. Weishampel, H. Osmólska, and P. Dodson (eds.), The Dinosauria. University of California Press, Berkeley 564-577.
- T. Maryańska (2000). Sauropods from Mongolia and the former Soviet Union. In: M.J. Benton, M.A. Shishkin, D.M. Unwin, and E.N. Kurochkin (eds.), The Age of Dinosaurs in Russia and Mongolia. Cambridge University Press, Cambridge 456-461.
- T. Maryańska, H. Osmólska, and M. Wolsan (2002). Avialan status for Oviraptorosauria. Acta Palaeontologica Polonica 47(1):97-116.
- J.M. Clark, T. Maryańska, and R. Barsbold (2004). Therizinosauroidea. In: D.B. Weishampel, P. Dodson, and H. Osmólska (eds.), The Dinosauria (second edition). University of California Press, Berkeley 151-164.
- M.K. Vickaryous, T. Maryańska, and D.B. Weishampel (2004). Ankylosauria. In: D.B. Weishampel, P. Dodson, and H. Osmólska (eds.), The Dinosauria (second edition). University of California Press, Berkeley 363-392.

== See also ==
- List of biologists
- List of geologists
- Zofia Kielan-Jaworowska
