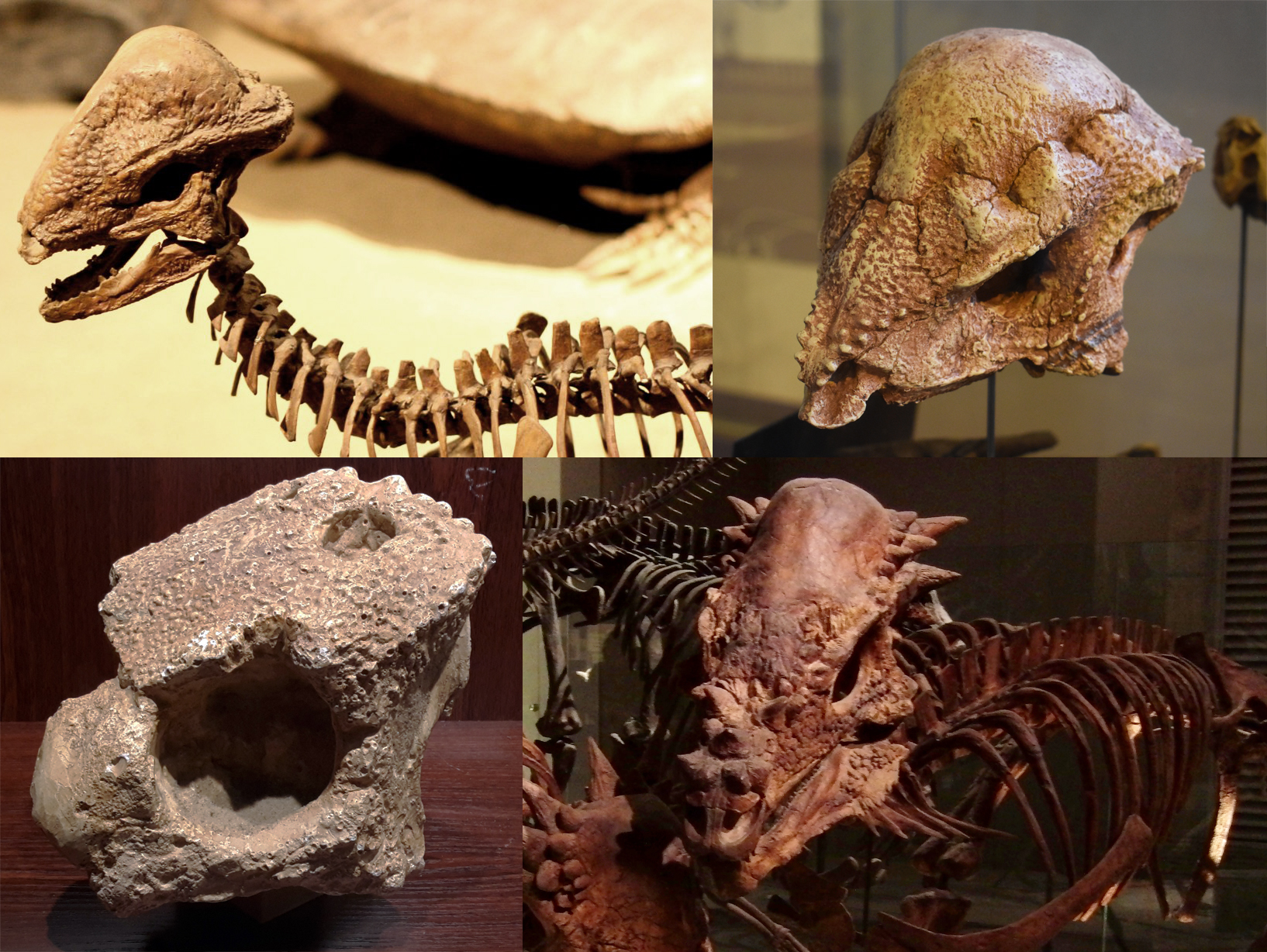
- Montage of four pachycephalosaurs. Clockwise from top left: Stegoceras, Prenocephale, Pachycephalosaurus and Homalocephale

Scientific classification
- Kingdom: Animalia
- Phylum: Chordata
- Class: Reptilia
- Clade: Dinosauria
- Clade: †Ornithischia
- Clade: †Marginocephalia
- Clade: †Pachycephalosauria; Maryańska & Osmólska, 1974

Type species
- †Pachycephalosaurus wyomingensis Gilmore, 1931 (conserved name)

Genera
- †Wannanosaurus; †Zavacephale; †Pachycephalosauridae Sternberg, 1945; †Colepiocephale; †Stegoceras; †Pachycephalosaurinae Sereno, 1997; †Acrotholus; †Alaskacephale; †Amtocephale; †Brontotholus; †Foraminacephale; †Goyocephale; †Homalocephale; †Platytholus; †Prenocephale; †Sinocephale?; †Sphaerotholus; †Tylocephale; †Pachycephalosaurini Sullivan, 2003; †Pachycephalosaurus; †Stygimoloch

= Pachycephalosauria =

Pachycephalosaurs Temporal range: Aptian–Maastrichtian

Extinct clade of dinosaurs

Pachycephalosauria (/ˌpækɪsɛfələˈsɔːriə, -ˌkɛf-/; (Note: "Pachycephalosauria". Oxford Dictionaries UK English Dictionary. Oxford University Press.) from Greek for 'thick headed lizards') is a clade of ornithischian dinosaurs. Along with Ceratopsia, it makes up the clade Marginocephalia. Pachycephalosaurs lived exclusively in the Northern Hemisphere during the Cretaceous period, with all members being found in North America and Asia. They were all bipedal, herbivorous/omnivorous animals with thick skulls. Skulls can be domed, flat, or wedge-shaped depending on the species, and are all heavily ossified. The domes were often surrounded by nodes and/or spikes. Partial skeletons have been found of several pachycephalosaur species, but to date no complete skeletons have been discovered. Often isolated skull fragments are the only bones that are found.

The oldest known definitive pachycephalosaur is Zavacephale from the Early Cretaceous (Aptian-Albian) of Mongolia. Candidates for the earlier pachycephalosaurs include Ferganocephale adenticulatum from Middle Jurassic Period strata of Kyrgyzstan and Stenopelix valdensis from Early Cretaceous strata of Germany, although R.M. Sullivan has doubted that either of these species are pachycephalosaurs. Albalophosaurus from the Early Cretaceous strata of Japan might also represent a basal pachycephalosaur, as well as the undiagnostic remains of Drinker from the Late Jurassic North America. In 2017, a phylogenetic analysis conducted by Han and colleagues identified Stenopelix as a member of the Ceratopsia.

== Description ==
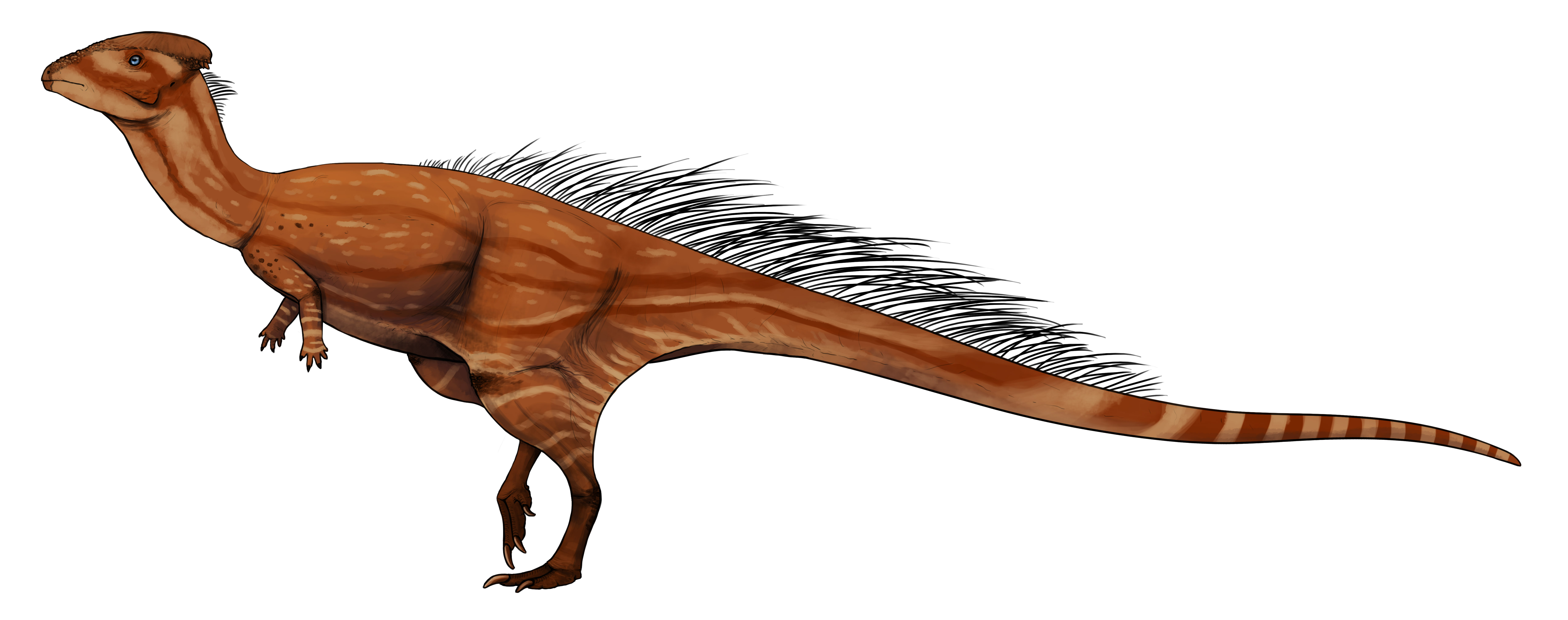
Life restoration of Wannanosaurus (basal member)

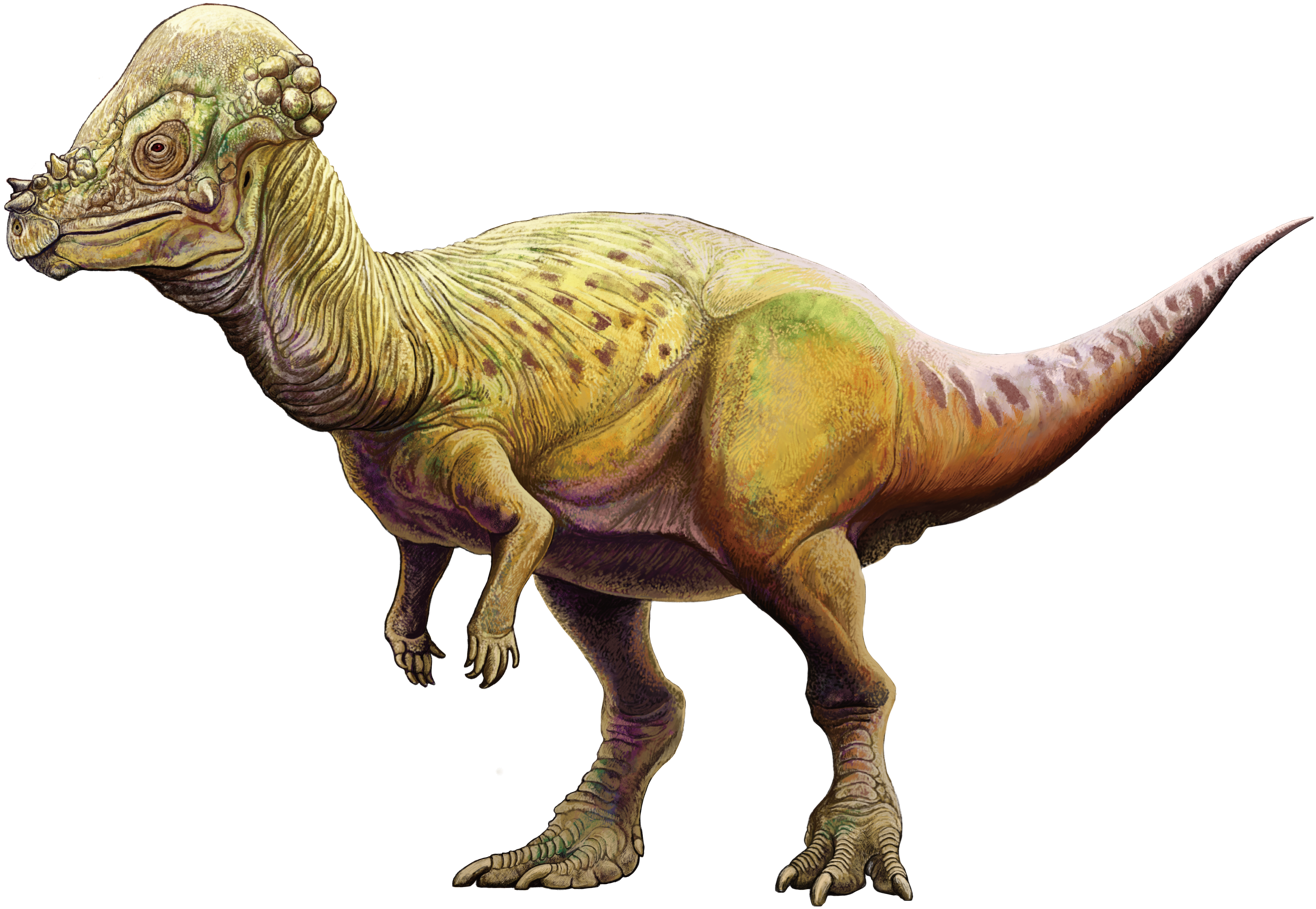
Life restoration of Pachycephalosaurus (derived member)

Pachycephalosaurs were bipedal ornithischians characterized by their thickened skulls. They had a bulky torso with an expanded gut cavity and broad hips, short forelimbs, long legs, a short, thick neck, and a heavy tail. Large orbits and a large optic nerve point to pachycephalosaurs having good vision, and uncharacteristically large olfactory lobes indicate that they had a good sense of smell relative to other dinosaurs. They were fairly small dinosaurs, with most falling in the range of 2–3 meters (6.6–9.8 feet) in length and the largest, Pachycephalosaurus wyomingensis, estimated to measure 4.5 meters (14.8 feet) long and weigh 450 kilograms (990 pounds). The characteristic skull of pachycephalosaurs is a result of the fusion and thickening of the frontals and parietals, accompanied by the closing of the supratemporal fenestra. In some species this takes the form of a raised dome; in others, the skull is flat or wedge-shaped. While the flat-headed pachycephalosaurs are traditionally regarded as distinct species or even families, they may represent juveniles of dome-headed adults. All display highly ornamented jugals, squamosals, and postorbitals in the form of blunt horns and nodes. Many species are only known from skull fragments, and a complete pachycephalosaur skeleton is yet to be found.

Members of Pachycephalosauria characteristically have an unusually domed head reminiscent of the earlier Protopyknosia in an example of convergent evolution.

== Classification ==
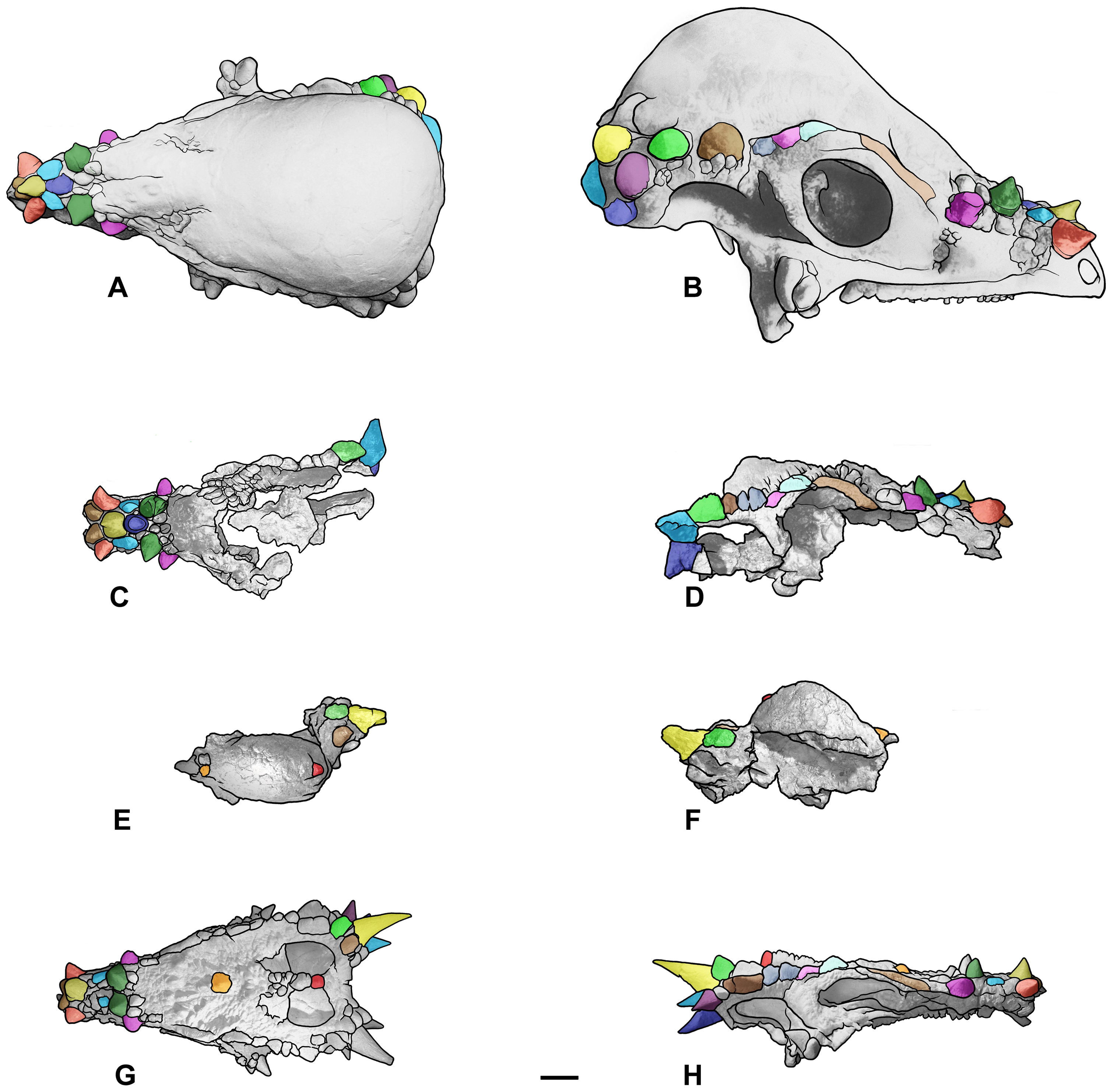
Diagram showing Dracorex and Stygimoloch as growth stages of Pachycephalosaurus

Most pachycephalosaurid remains are not complete, usually consisting of portions of the frontoparietal bone that forms the distinctive dome. This can make taxonomic identification a difficult task, as the classification of genera and species within Pachycephalosauria relies almost entirely on cranial characteristics. Consequently, improper species have historically been appointed to the clade. For instance, Majungatholus, once thought to be a pachycephalosaur, is now recognized as a specimen of the abelisaurid theropod Majungasaurus, and Yaverlandia, another archosaur initially described as a pachycephalosaurid, has also since been reclassified as an archosaur of uncertain affinities.

A 2009 paper proposed that Dracorex and Stygimoloch were just early growth stages of Pachycephalosaurus, rather than distinct genera.

A 2020 reworking of Cerapoda by Dieudonné et al. recovered the animals traditionally considered 'heterodontosaurids' as a basal grouping within Pachycephalosauria, paraphyletic with respect to the traditional, dome-headed pachycephalosaurs. The same conclusion had previously been reached by George Olshevsky in 1991, who classified heterodontosaurids as basal pachycephalosaurs on the basis of perceived cranial kinesis, the presence of fanglike premaxillary teeth, and the prominent diastema present in many genera.

=== Taxonomy ===
The Pachycephalosauria was first named as a suborder of the order Ornithischia by Maryańska & Osmólska (1974). They included within it only one family, the Pachycephalosauridae. Later researchers, such as Michael Benton, have ranked it as an infraorder of a suborder Cerapoda, which unites the ceratopsians and ornithopods. In 2006, Robert Sullivan published a re-evaluation of pachycephalosaur taxonomy. Sullivan considered attempts by Maryańska and Osmólska to restrict the definition of Pachycephalosauria redundant with their Pachycephalosauridae, since they were diagnosed by the same anatomical characters. Sullivan also rejected attempts by Sereno (1986), in his phylogenetic studies, to redefine Pachycephalosauridae to include only "dome-skulled" species (including Stegoceras and Pachycephalosaurus), while leaving more "basal" species outside that family in Pachycephalosauria. Therefore, Sullivan's use of Pachycephalosauridae is equivalent to Sereno and Benton's use of Pachycephalosauria.

Sullivan diagnosed the Pachycephalosauridae-based only on characters of the skull, with the defining character being a dome-shaped frontoparietal skull bone. According to Sullivan, the absence of this feature in some species assumed to be primitive led to the split in classification between domed and non-domed pachycephalosaurs; however, discovery of more advanced and possibly juvenile pachycephalosaurs with flat skulls (such as Dracorex hogwartsia) show this distinction to be incorrect. Sullivan also pointed out that the original diagnosis of Pachycephalosauridae centered around "flat to dome-like" skulls, so the flat-headed forms should be included in the family. In a paper published in 2003, Thomas E. Williamson and Thomas D. Carr discovered a clade of the Pachycephalosauridae that was a sister taxa to the genus Stegoceras, made up of "all other dome-headed pachycephalosaurians; this was referred to as Pachycephalosaurinae

=== Phylogeny ===
Phylogenetic analyses by many authors have found Pachycephalosauria to be a group with Stegoceras as one of the earliest fully-domed members, with flat-headed and potentially juvenile taxa like Homalocephale and Goyocephale either just outside or just within the clade of it and more derived pachycephalosaurs. These studies began with the phylogenetic work of Paul Sereno, which has been modified in many iterations to include newer taxa and additional characters. The version of the analysis published by Woodruff and colleagues in 2023 is below.

- Pachycephalosauria
  - Wannanosaurus
  - - Pachycephalosauridae
      - - Hanssuesia
        - Colepiocephale
        - Stegoceras validum
        - Stegoceras novomexicanum
      - - Pachycephalosaurinae
          - Goyocephale
          - - Homalocephale
            - - Tylocephale
              - - Foraminacephale
                - - Amtocephale
                  - - Acrotholus
                    - Prenocephale
                    - - Alaskacephale
                      - - Pachycephalosaurini
                          - Stygimoloch
                          - Pachycephalosaurus
                      - - Sphaerotholus
                          - S. goodwini
                          - S. lyonsi
                          - S. triregnum
                          - - S. buchholtzae
                            - S. edmontonensis

Below is a cladogram published by Dieudonné and colleagues (2020) which controversially found heterodontosaurids to be paraphyletic with respect to pachycephalosauria. This analysis was proposed as a hypothesis for the complete lack of Jurassic and Early Cretaceous pachycephalosaur fossils, even though they should have existed if the modern understanding of ornithischian phylogeny is correct. However, this hypothesis has not been widely accepted by other paleontologists.

- Pachycephalosauria
  - - Fruitadens
    - - Lycorhinus
      - - Heterodontosaurus
        - Abrictosaurus
  - - Tianyulong
    - - Echinodon
      - - Wannanosaurus
        - - Goyocephale
          - - Prenocephale
            - Homalocephale
            - Stegoceras
            - Pachycephalosaurus

== Paleobiology ==
=== Feeding ===
The small size of most pachycephalosaur species and lack of skeletal adaptation indicates that they were not climbers and primarily ate food close to the ground. Mallon et al. (2013) examined herbivore coexistence on the island continent of Laramidia, during the Late Cretaceous and concluded that pachycephalosaurids were generally restricted to feeding on vegetation at, or below, the height of 1 meter. They exhibit heterodonty, having different tooth morphology between the premaxillary teeth and maxillary teeth. Front teeth are small and peg-like with an ovular cross section and were most likely used for grabbing food. In some species, the last premaxillary tooth was enlarged and canine-like. Back teeth are small and triangular with denticles on the front and back of the crown, used for mouth processing. In species in which the dentary has been found, mandibular teeth are similar in size and shape to those in the upper jaw. Wear patterns on the teeth vary by species, indicating a range of food preferences which could include seeds, stems, leaves, fruits, and possibly insects. A very wide rib cage and large gut cavity extending all the way to the base of the tail suggests the use of fermentation to digest food.

=== Head-butting behavior ===
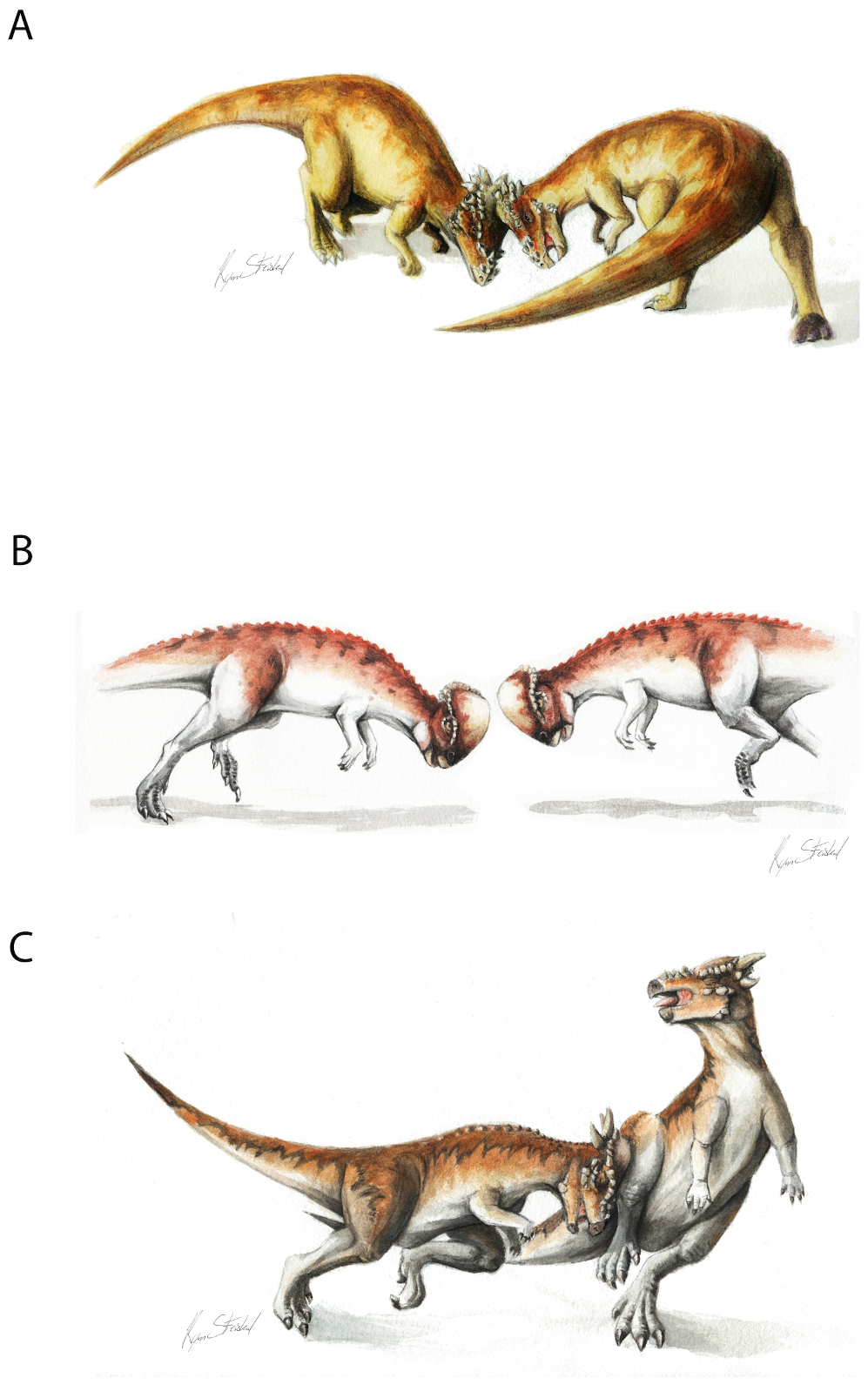
Hypothetical examples of pachycephalosaur combat behavior, varying per species: Pachycephalosaurus (A), Prenocephale (B), Stygimoloch (C)

The adaptive significance of the skull dome has been heavily debated. The popular hypothesis among the general public that the skull was used in head-butting, as sort of a dinosaurian battering ram, was first proposed by Colbert (1955), p.. This view was popularized in the 1956 science fiction story "A Gun for Dinosaur" by L. Sprague de Camp. Many paleontologists have since argued for the head-butting hypothesis, including Galton (1970) and Sues (1978). In this hypothesis, pachycephalosaurs rammed each other head-on, as do modern-day bighorn sheep and musk oxen.

Anatomical evidence for combative behavior includes vertebral articulations providing spinal rigidity, and the shape of the back indicating strong neck musculature. It has been suggested that a pachycephalosaur could make its head, neck, and body horizontally straight, in order to transmit stress during ramming. However, in no known dinosaur could the head, neck, and body be oriented in such a position. Instead, the cervical and anterior dorsal vertebrae of pachycephalosaurs show that the neck was carried in an "S"- or U-shaped curve.

Also, the rounded shape of the skull would lessen the contacted surface area during head-butting, resulting in glancing blows. Other possibilities include flank-butting, defense against predators, or both. The relatively wide build of pachycephalosaurs (which would protect vital internal organs from harm during flank-butting) and the squamosal horns of the Stygimoloch (which would have been used to great effect during flank-butting) add credence to the flank-butting hypothesis.

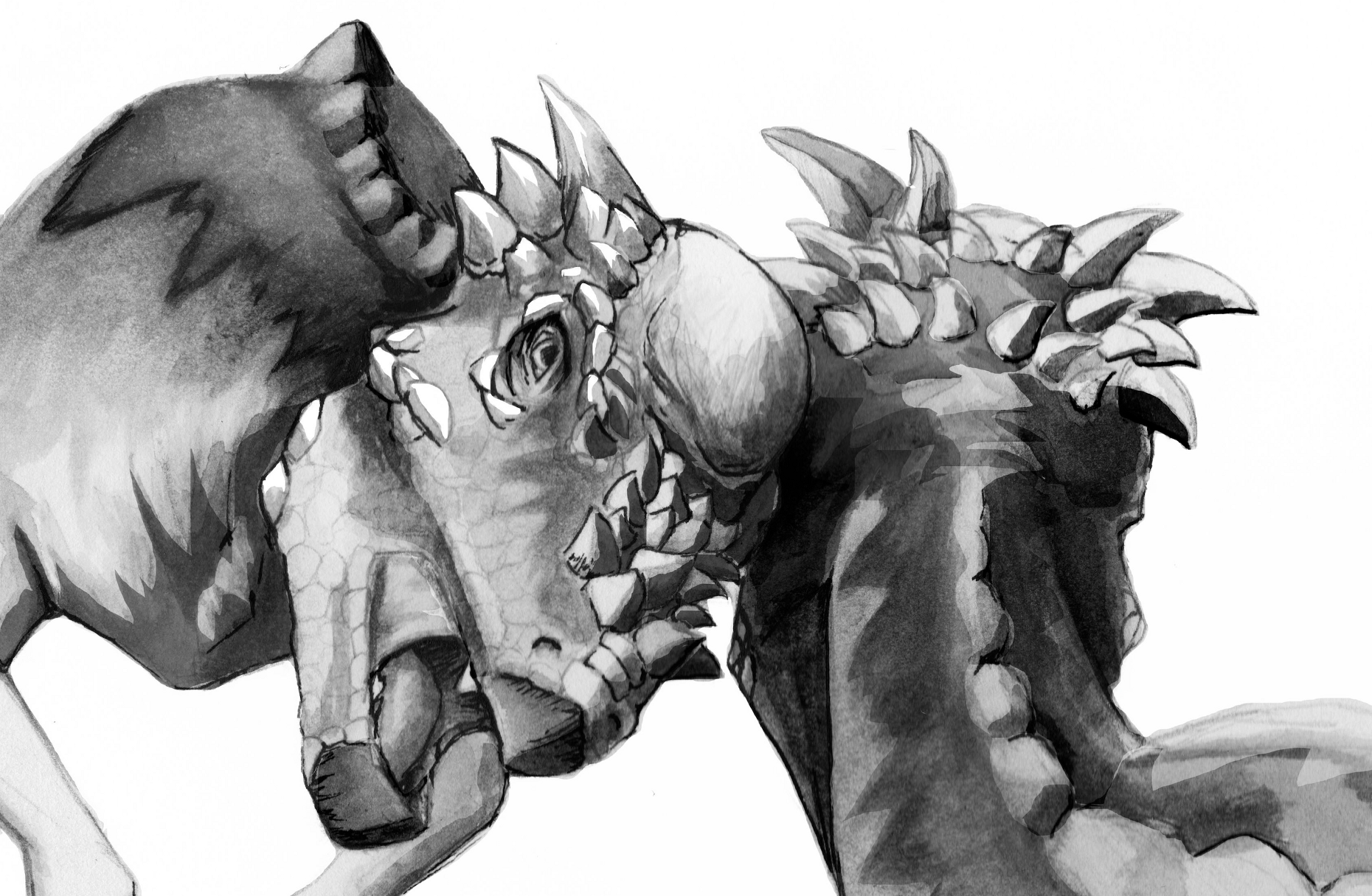
Restoration of head-butting Pachycephalosaurus

A histological study conducted by Goodwin & Horner (2004) argued against the battering ram hypothesis. They argued that the dome was "an ephemeral ontogenetic stage", the spongy bone structure could not sustain the blows of combat, and the radial pattern was simply an effect of rapid growth. Later biomechanical analyses by Snively & Cox (2008) and Snively & Theodor (2011) concluded, however, that the domes could withstand combat stresses.Lehman (2010) argued that the growth patterns discussed by Goodwin and Horner are not inconsistent with head-butting behavior.

Goodwin & Horner (2004) instead argued that the dome functioned for species recognition. There is evidence that the dome had some form of external covering, and it is reasonable to consider the dome may have been brightly covered, or subject to change color seasonally. Due to the nature of the fossil record, however, it cannot be observed whether or not color played a role in dome function.

Longrich, Sankey & Tanke (2010) argued that species recognition is an unlikely evolutionary cause for the dome, because dome forms are not notably different between species. Because of this general similarity, several genera of Pachycephalosauridae have sometimes been incorrectly lumped together. This is unlike the case in ceratopsians and hadrosaurids, which had much more distinct cranial ornamentation. Longrich et al. argued that instead the dome had a mechanical function, such as combat, one which was important enough to justify the resource investment.

==== Dome paleopathology ====
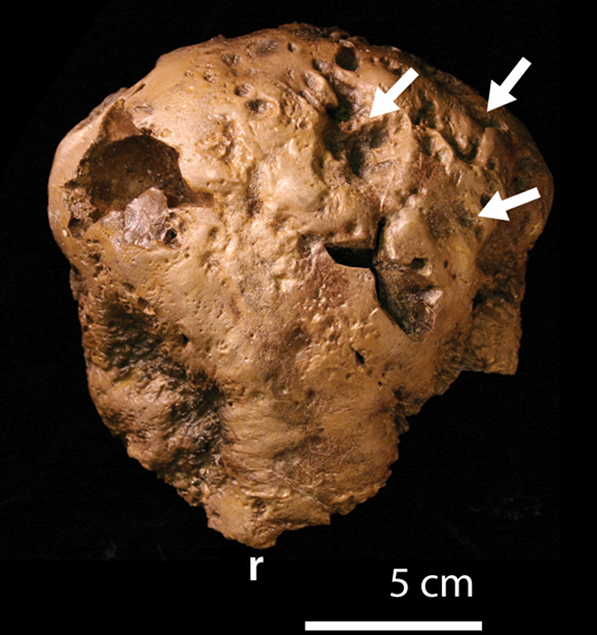
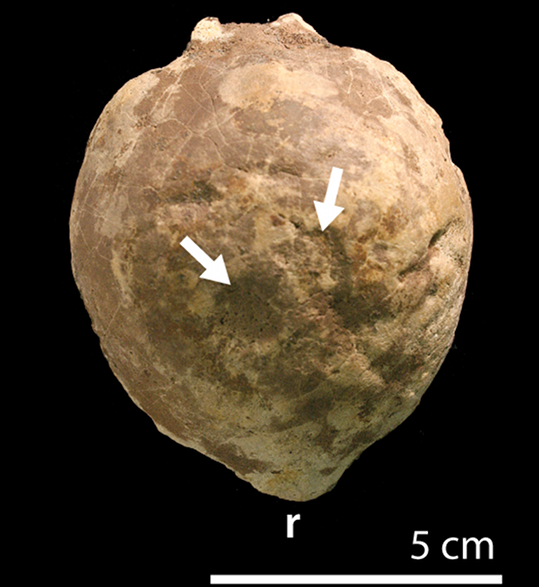
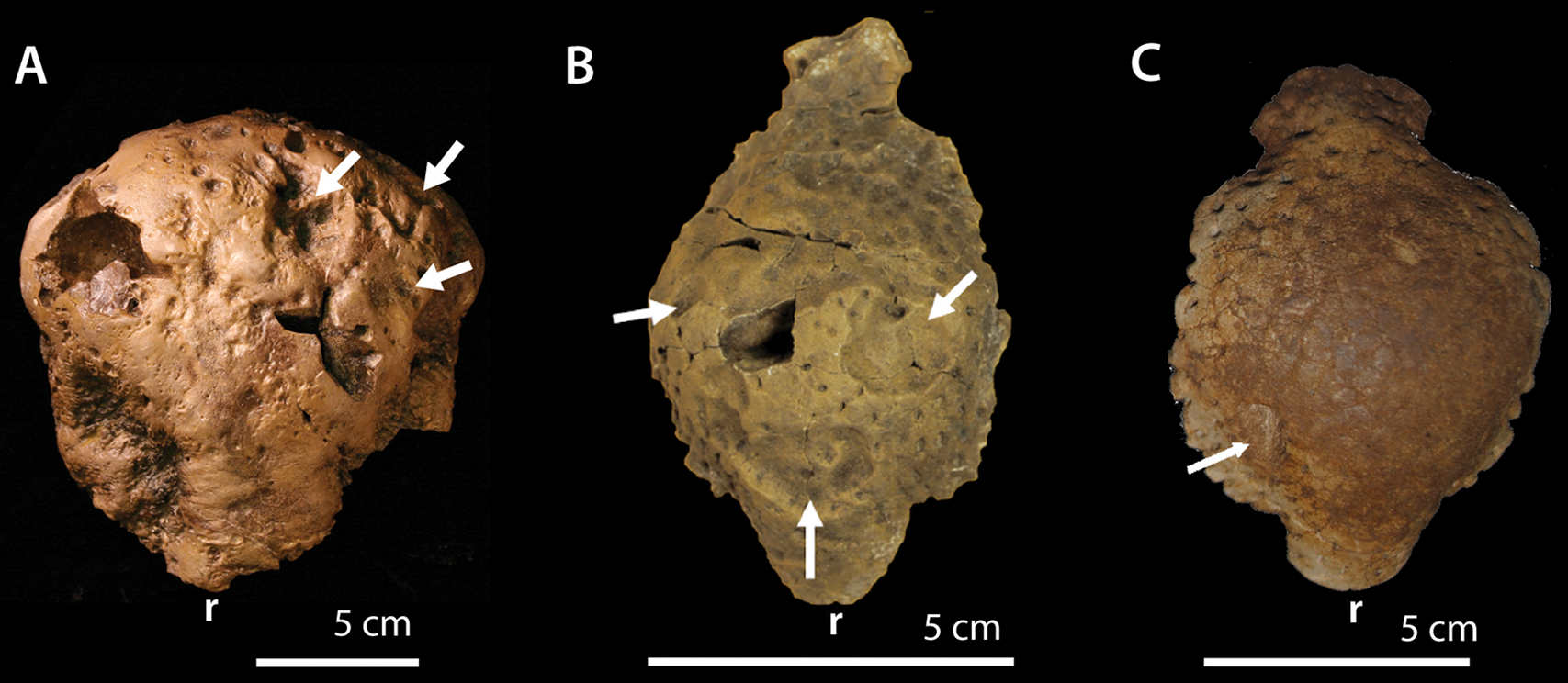
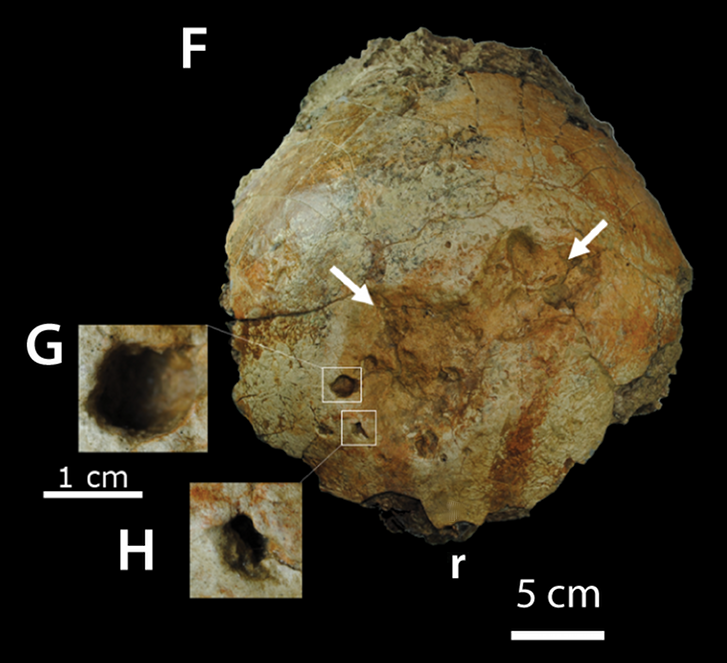
Skull domes of Gravitholus, Sphaerotholus, Stegoceras, and Pachycephalosaurus showing injuries

Peterson, Dischler & Longrich (2013) studied cranial pathologies among the Pachycephalosauridae and found that 22% of all domes examined had lesions that are consistent with osteomyelitis, an infection of the bone resulting from penetrating trauma, or trauma to the tissue overlying the skull leading to an infection of the bone tissue. This high rate of pathology lends more support to the hypothesis that pachycephalosaurid domes were employed in intra-specific combat. The frequency of trauma was comparable across the different genera in this family, despite the fact that these genera vary with respect to the size and architecture of their domes, and fact that they existed during varying geologic periods. These findings were in stark contrast with the results from analysis of the relatively flat-headed pachycephalosaurids, where there was an absence of pathology. This would support the hypothesis that these individuals represent either females or juveniles, where intra-specific combat behavior is not expected.

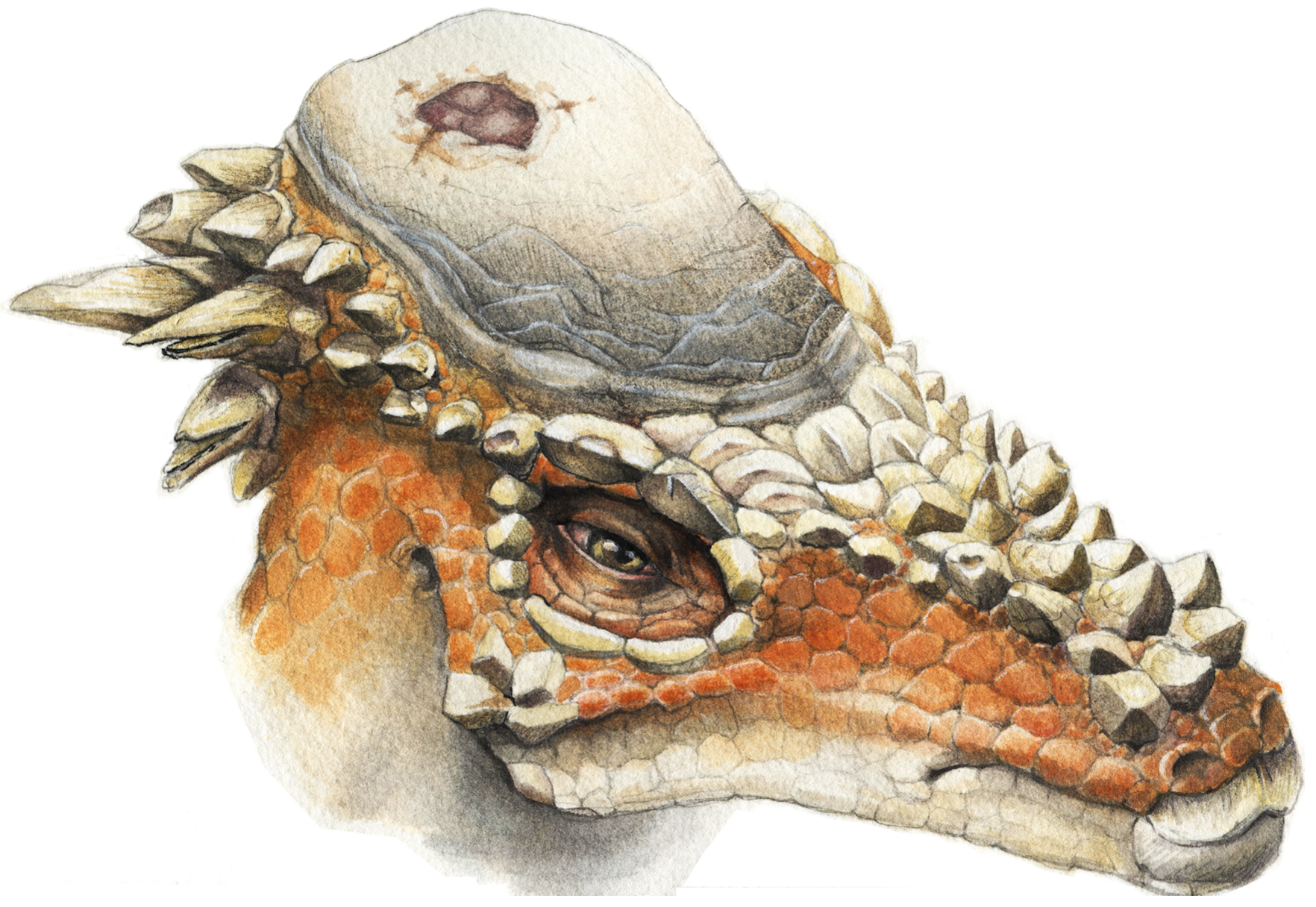
Pachycephalosaurus life restoration with cranial injury

Histological examination reveals that pachycephalosaurid domes are composed of a unique form of fibrolamellar bone which contains fibroblasts that play a critical role in wound healing, and are capable of rapidly depositing bone during remodeling. Peterson et al. (2013) concluded that, taken together, the frequency of lesion distribution and the bone structure of frontoparietal domes lend strong support to the hypothesis that pachycephalosaurids used their unique cranial structures for agonistic behavior.

== Paleoecology ==
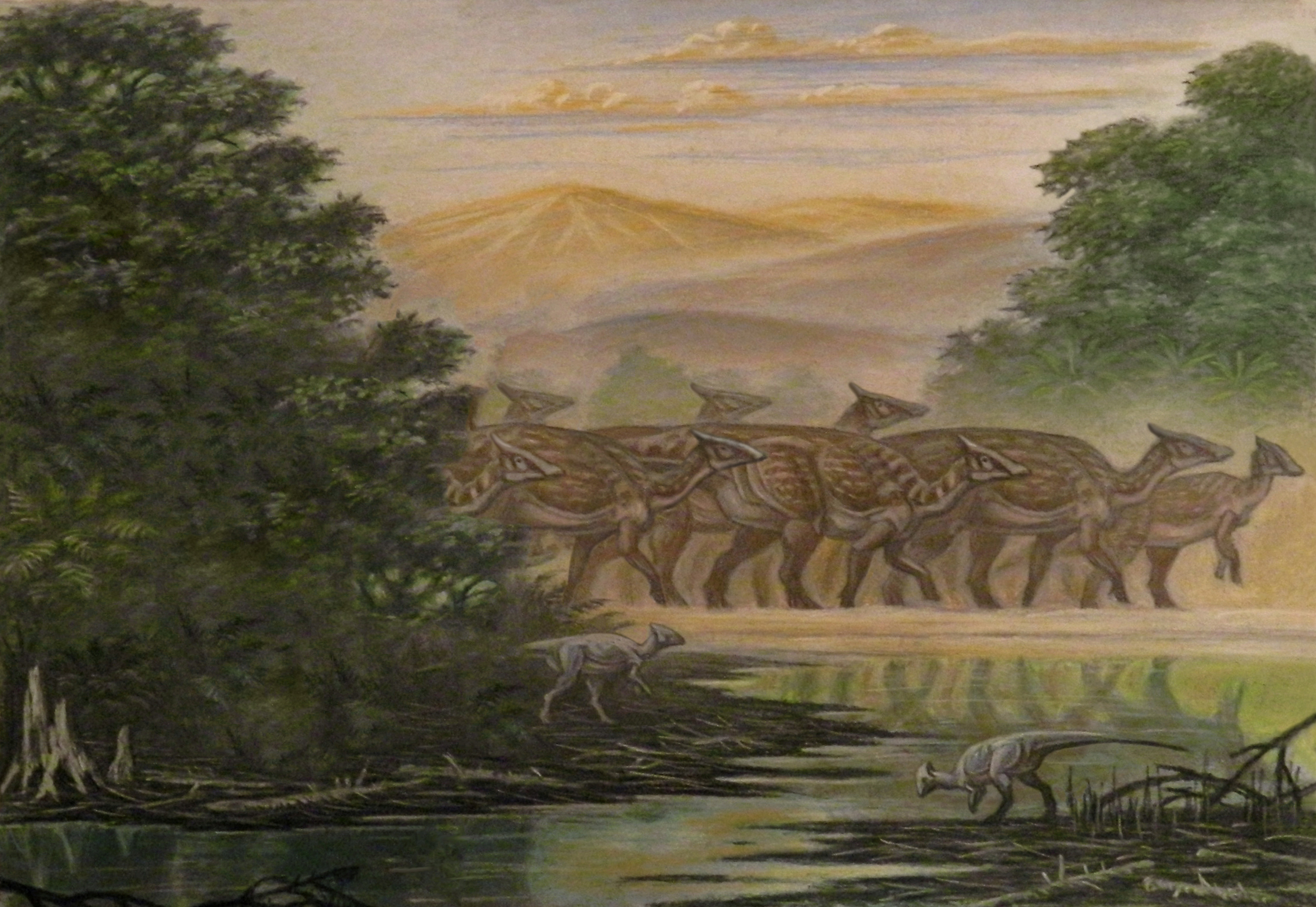
Restoration of Homalocephale in its paleoenvironment

The Asian and North American species of pachycephalosaurs lived in markedly different environments. Asian specimens are normally more intact, indicating they were not transported far from their place of death before fossilization. They likely lived in a large desert region in central Asia with a hot and arid climate. North American specimens are typically found in rocks that were formed by erosion from the Rocky Mountains. Specimens are far less intact; usually only skull caps are recovered, and those found regularly exhibit surface exfoliation and other signs that they were transported long distances by water before fossilization. It is assumed that they lived in the mountains in a temperate climate and were carried by erosion after death to their final resting place.

=== Distribution ===
Pachycephalosaurs lived exclusively in Laurasia, being found in western North America and central Asia. Pachycephalosaurs originated in Asia and had two major dispersal events, resulting in the two separate waves of pachycephalosaur evolution observed in Asia. The first, occurring before the late Santonian or early Campanian, involved a migration from Asia to North America, most likely by way of the Bering Land Bridge. This migration was by a common ancestor of Stygimoloch, Stegoceras, Tylocephale, Prenocephale, and Pachycephalosaurus. The second event occurred before the middle Campanian, and involved a migration back into Asia from North America by a common ancestor of Prenocephale and Tylocephale. Two species originally reported to be pachycephalosaurs discovered outside this range, Yaverlandia bitholus of England and Majungatholus atopus of Madagascar, have recently been shown to actually be theropods.

== See also ==
- Timeline of pachycephalosaur research
- Triopticus Convergent evolution
