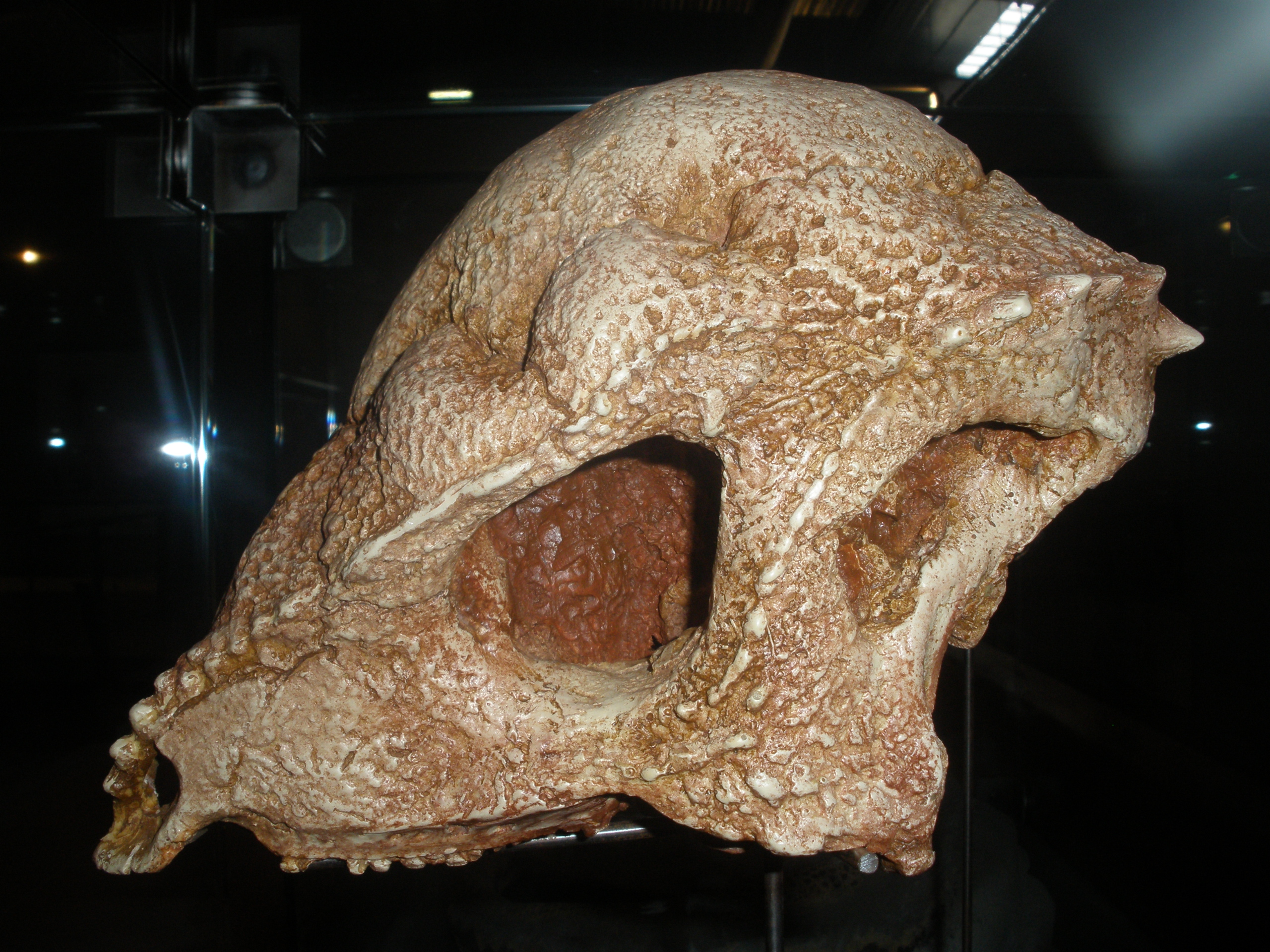
- Holotype skull ZPAL MgD-I/104

Scientific classification
- Kingdom: Animalia
- Phylum: Chordata
- Class: Reptilia
- Clade: Dinosauria
- Clade: †Ornithischia
- Clade: †Pachycephalosauria
- Family: †Pachycephalosauridae
- Subfamily: †Pachycephalosaurinae
- Genus: †Prenocephale; Maryańska & Osmólska, 1974

Species
- †P. prenes Maryńska & Osmólska, 1974 (type)

Synonyms
- Homalocephale? Maryanska & Osmólska, 1974

= Prenocephale =

Prenocephale Temporal range: Late Cretaceous, Maastrichtian

Extinct genus of dinosaurs

Prenocephale (meaning "sloping head") is a genus of small pachycephalosaurid dinosaur from the Late Cretaceous Nemegt Formation of Mongolia. It was similar in many ways to its close relative, Homalocephale.

== Discovery ==
The holotype specimen, Z. Pal. No. MgD-I/104, consists of an isolated yet well-preserved skull, dorsal vertebrae and ribs, sacrum, femora, and caudal vertebrae. It was discovered by the Polish-Mongolian Paleontological Expedition and was found at the Nemegt locality, in a sandstone layer of the Nemegt Formation. Additional specimens have been recovered from the Bügiin Tsav, Guriliin Tsav, and Tsaagan Khushuu localities of the formation.

== Description ==
Size compared to a human

Adult Prenocephale measured 2.2–2.4 m (7.2–7.9 ft) in length and 40 kg (88 lb) in body mass. Unlike the flattened wedge-shaped skull of Homalocephale (a possible juvenile trait also potentially seen in early growth stages of Pachycephalosaurus), the head of Prenocephale was rounded and sloping. The dome had a row of small bony spikes and bumps.

Like some other pachycephalosaurs, Prenocephale is known only from skulls and a few other small bones. For this reason, reconstructions usually depict Prenocephale as sharing the basic body plan common to all of the other Pachycephalosauria: a stout body with a short, thick neck, short forelimbs and tall hind legs.

The head of Prenocephale was comparable to that of Stegoceras, albeit with closed supratemporal fenestrae. Also, the paired grooves above the supraorbitals/prefrontals (along with a posterior parietal that restricts the frontal dome) are absent in Prenocephale. This differentiates the species from Stegoceras, as such features are common in the latter.

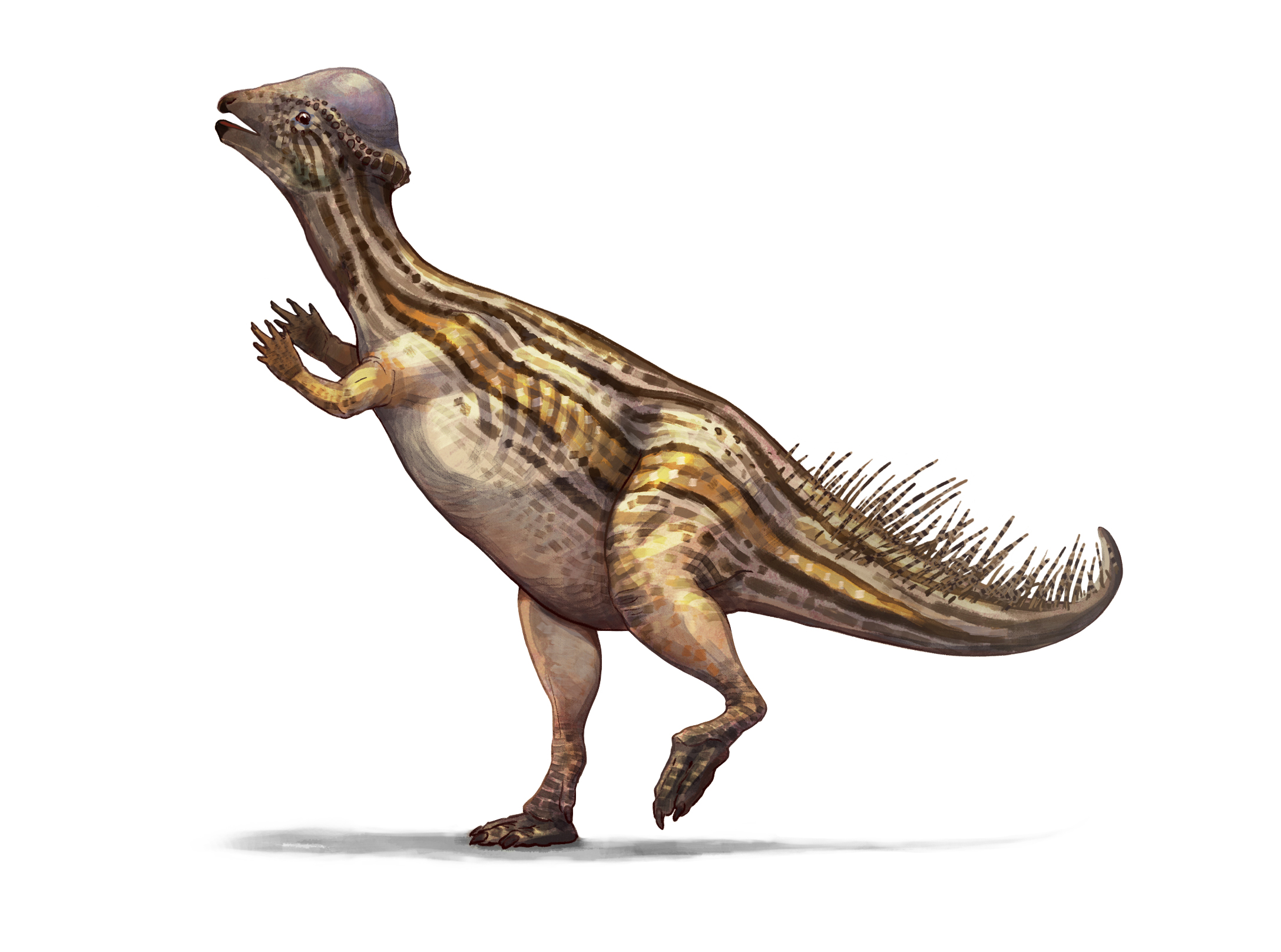
Life restoration

== Classification ==
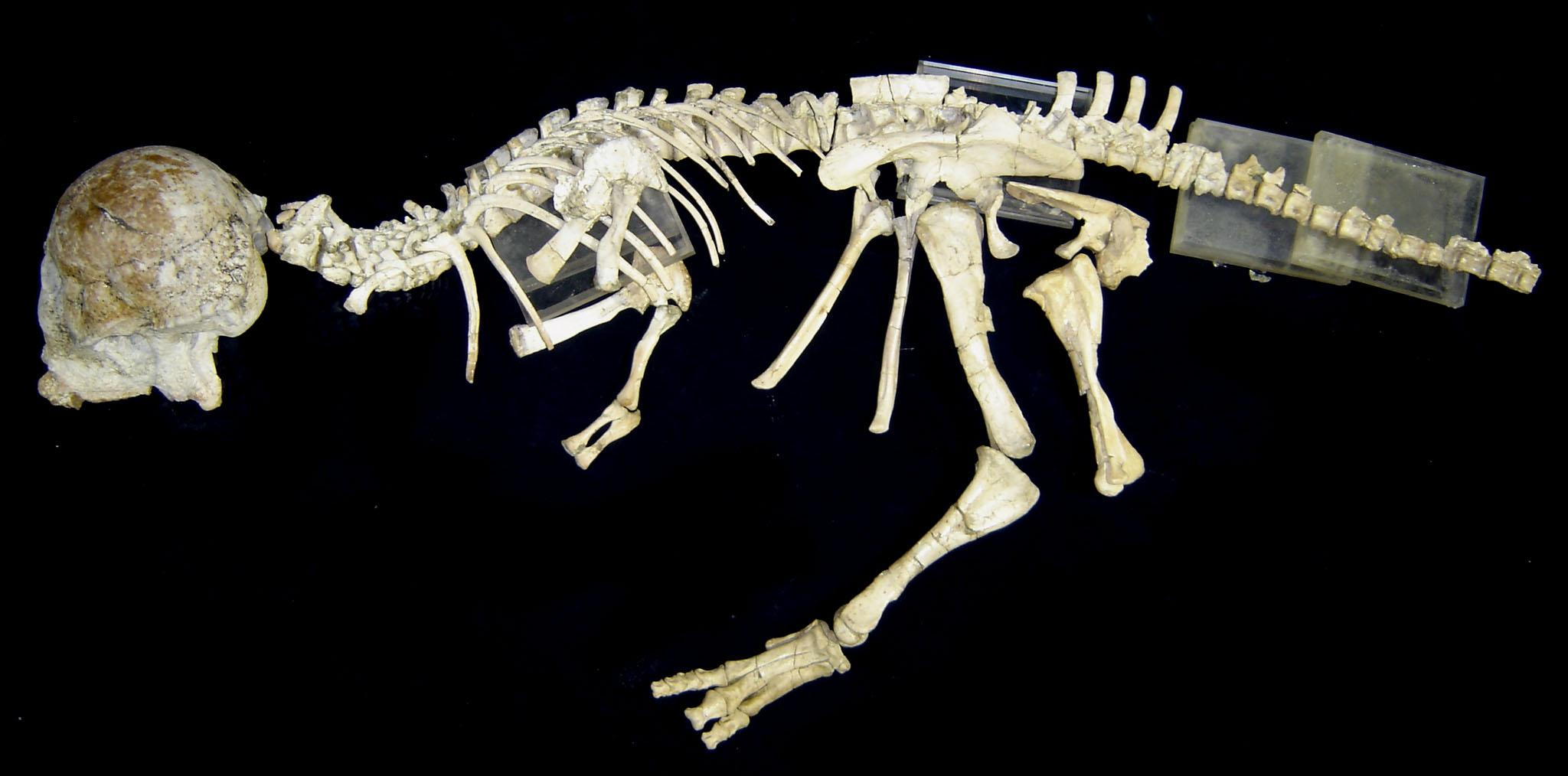
Undescribed putative Prenocephale specimen

Prenocephale is a member of the Pachycephalosauria, a large clade of herbivorous/omnivorous dinosaurs from the Late Cretaceous. Robert Sullivan considered Foraminacephale, "Prenocephale" edmontonensis, and Sphaerotholus goodwini to form a clade with the Asian taxon P. prenes. He considered Tylocephale the sister taxon to the Prenocephale clade, while sinking Sphaerotholus buchholtzae as a subjective junior synonym of "P." edmontonensis. They all possess a distinct row of nodes on the squamosal and parietal areas of the skull roof. However, Longrich et al. (2010) and Schott and Evans (2016) kept Sphaerotholus as a distinct genus based on cladistic analysis.

Homalocephale has been viewed as a possible juvenile of Prenocephale due to the lack of a dome and its discovery in the same location and chronological interval, but new specimens of Prenocephale, including a juvenile specimen, suggest that Homalocephale, even if its holotype is a juvenile, is distinct.

Below is a cladogram modified from Evans et al., 2013.

- Pachycephalosauria
  - Wannanosaurus yansiensis
  - Pachycephalosauridae
    - - Colepiocephale lambei
      - Hanssuesia sternbergi
      - Stegoceras novomexicanum
      - Stegoceras validum
    - - Goyocephale lattimorei
      - - Homalocephale calathocercos
        - - Tylocephale gilmorei
          - - Foraminacephale brevis
            - - Amtocephale gobiensis
              - - - Acrotholus audeti
                  - Prenocephale prenes
                - - - Alaskacephale gangloffi
                    - Pachycephalosaurus wyomingensis
                  - - Sphaerotholus buchholtzae
                    - Sphaerotholus goodwini

== Paleoenvironment ==
Prenocephale lived in what is now the Nemegt Formation, in high upland forests, not the dry deserts of Mongolia nowadays.

== See also ==
- Timeline of pachycephalosaur research
