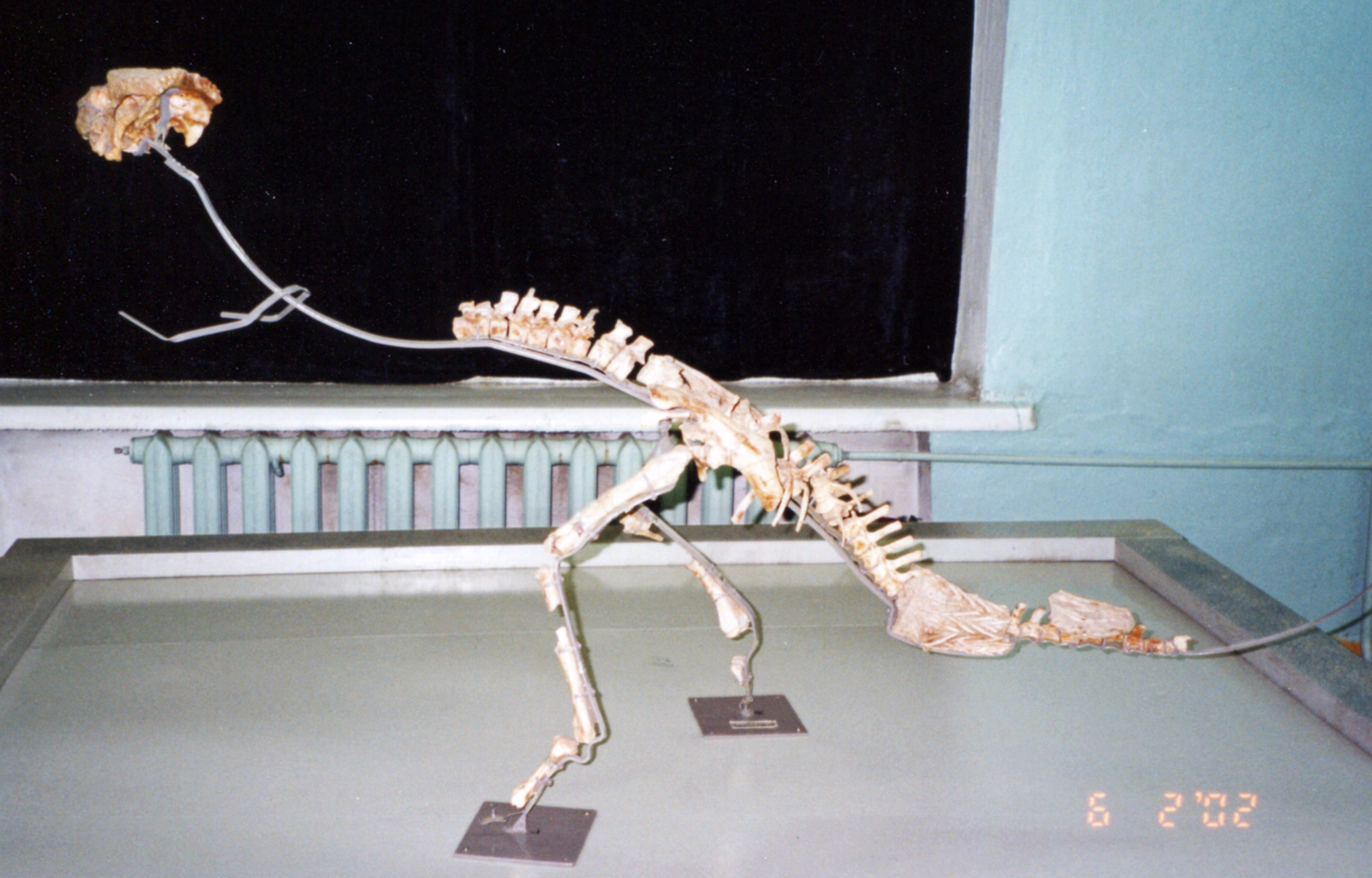
- Mounted holotype in the Mongolian Natural History Museum, 2002

Scientific classification
- Kingdom: Animalia
- Phylum: Chordata
- Class: Reptilia
- Clade: Dinosauria
- Clade: †Ornithischia
- Clade: †Pachycephalosauria
- Family: †Pachycephalosauridae
- Genus: †Homalocephale; Maryanska & Osmolska, 1974
- Species: †H. calathocercos

Binomial name
- †Homalocephale calathocercos Maryanska & Osmolska, 1974

= Homalocephale =

Homalocephale Temporal range: Late Cretaceous, Maastrichtian

Extinct genus of dinosaurs

Homalocephale (from Greek ὁμαλός, homalos, "even", and κεφαλή, kephalē, "head") is a genus of pachycephalosaurid dinosaur that lived during the Late Cretaceous period of what is now the Nemegt Formation, Mongolia. The genus was described in 1974 by Halszka Osmólska and Teresa Maryańska, and consists of a single species, H. calathocercos. Though Homalocephale has been regarded as a synonym (and juvenile form) of Prenocephale, juvenile specimens of the latter indicate that they were distinct. Homalocephale was 1.8 m (5.9 ft) long and possibly an omnivore.

== Discovery ==
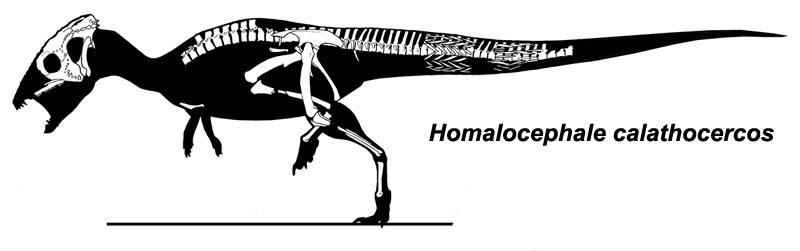
Skeletal diagram of the holotype

The type species, H. calathocercos, was described from an incomplete skull and postcranial material (holotype MPC-D 100/1201) from the Nemegt locality of the Nemegt Formation. The specimen has large openings on the top of the skull, a distinct frontoparietal suture, low and long infratemporal fenestrae, and a large, round eye socket. The forehead is notably rough, with multiple nodules on the lateral and posterior sides of the squamosal bone. Paleontologists concluded that the specimen was an adult, despite the fact that the sutures are discernible and that it had a flat skull (a juvenile trait in many pachycephalosaurid species).

In 2010, a study by Nick Longrich and colleagues suggested that flat-headed pachycephalosaurs were just juvenile forms of dome-headed adults, a view also supported by the earlier analysis of Horner and Goodwin in 2009. Longrich and colleagues suggested that Homalocephale is actually the juvenile or sub-adult stage of Prenocephale mainly based on the lack of a dome and being discovered in the same locality (Nemegt) as the latter.

David C. Evans and team in 2018 reported juvenile specimens of Prenocephale from the Nemegt Formation, noting a relatively linear growth in this pachycephalosaur characterized by a rounded dome. This differs from the flat skull of Homalocephale and given that even juvenile Prenocephale possessed a rather rounded dome, both taxa should be regarded as separate.

== Description ==
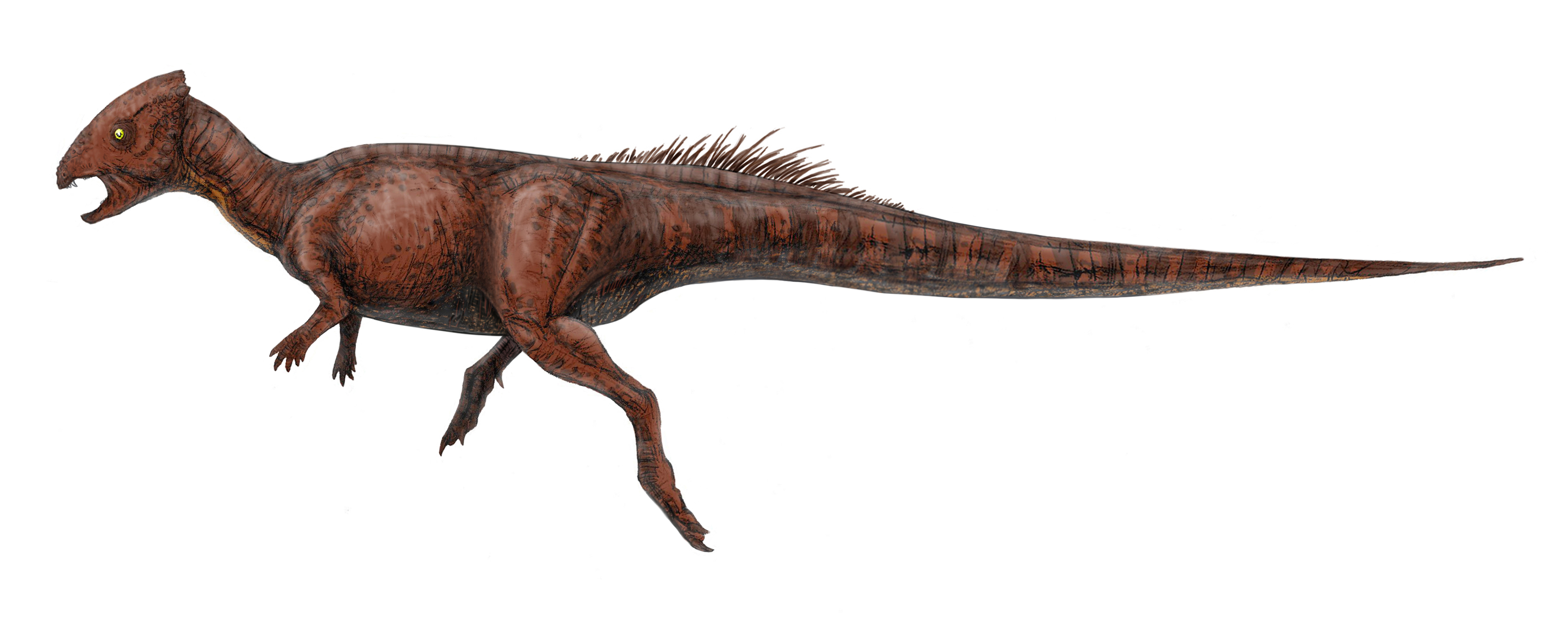
Life restoration

Homalocephale was about 1.8 m (5.9 ft) long. Unlike other definitely adult pachycephalosaurs (though similar to probable juvenile specimens referred to Dracorex and Goyocephale), Homalocephale sported a flat, wedge-shaped skull roof. Nonetheless, the surface of the skull was fairly thickened.

== Classification ==
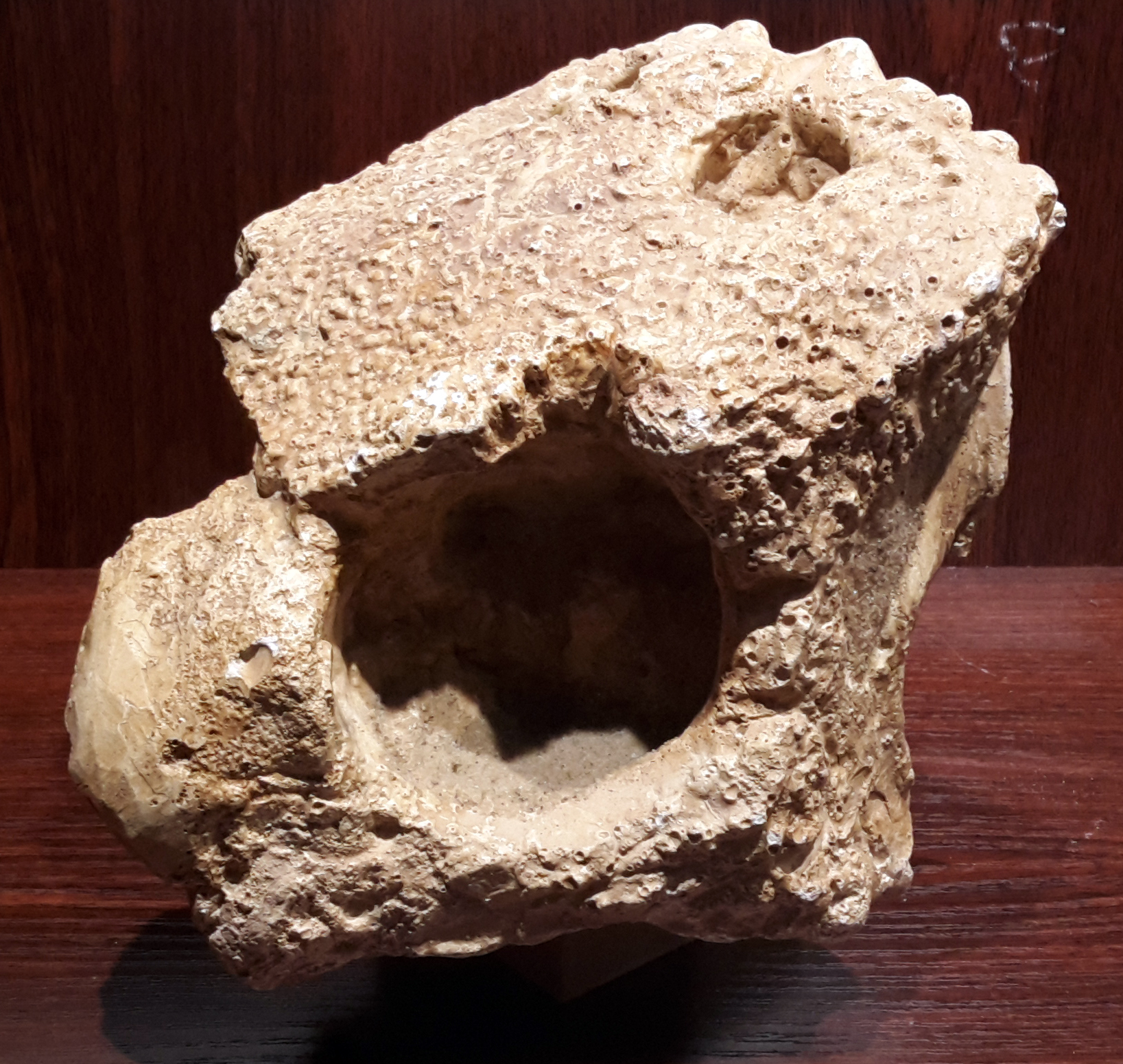
Cast of the holotype skull in the Museum of Evolution of Polish Academy of Sciences, Warsaw

Below is a cladogram from Evans et al. (2013).

- Pachycephalosauria
  - Wannanosaurus yansiensis
  - Pachycephalosauridae
    - - Colepiocephale lambei
      - Hanssuesia sternbergi
      - Stegoceras novomexicanum
      - Stegoceras validum
    - - Goyocephale lattimorei
      - - Homalocephale calathocercos
        - - Tylocephale gilmorei
          - - Foraminacephale brevis
            - - Amtocephale gobiensis
              - - - Acrotholus audeti
                  - Prenocephale prenes
                - - - Alaskacephale gangloffi
                    - Pachycephalosaurus wyomingensis
                  - - Sphaerotholus buchholtzae
                    - Sphaerotholus goodwini

== Paleobiology ==
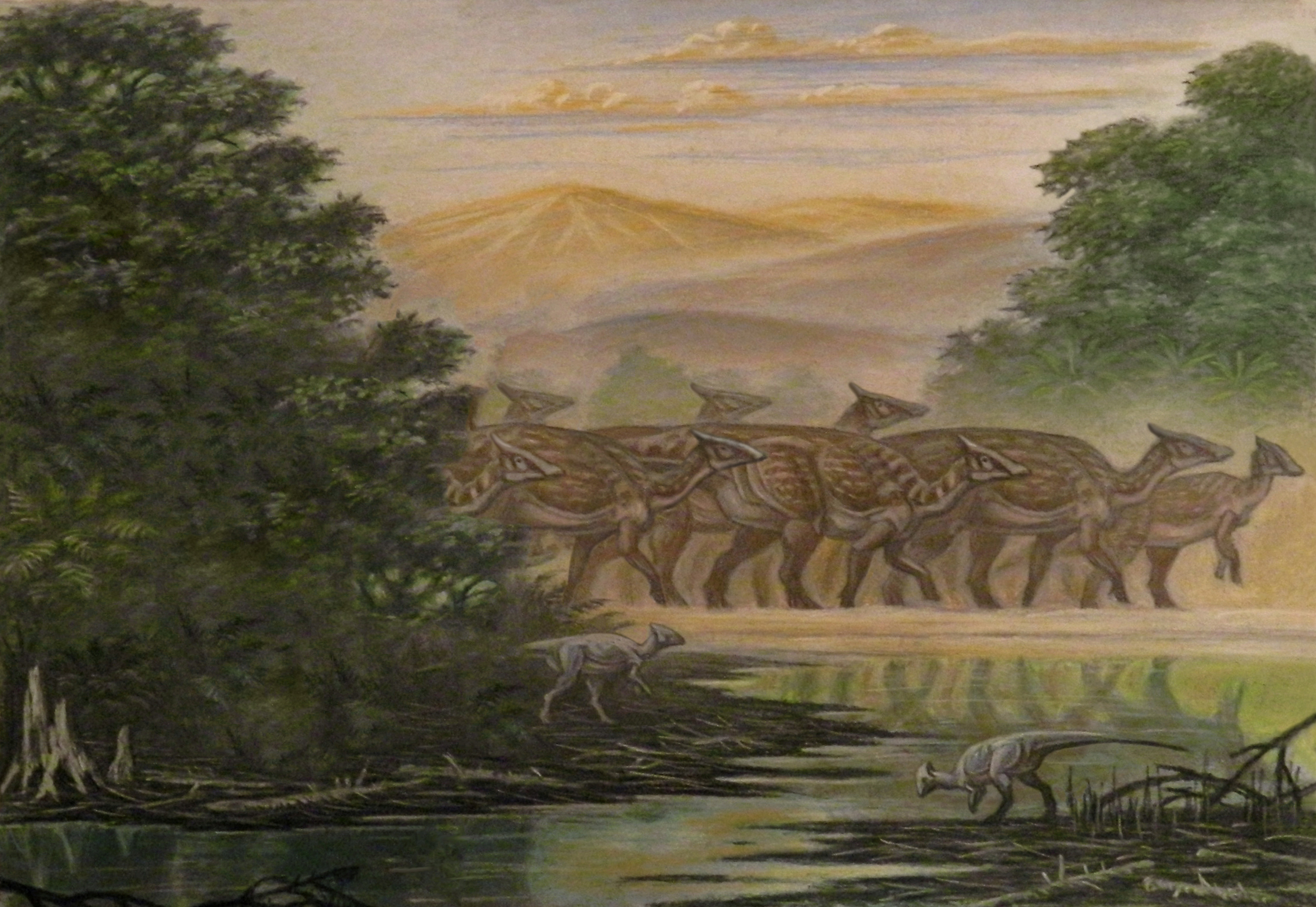
Two Homalocephale with Saurolophus herd behind

Homalocephale is also noted for having an unusually broad pelvis and some have suggested that the width served to protect vital organs from harm during flank-butting. Others think that they were for giving birth to live young, instead of laying eggs. Homalocephale also had rather long legs, indicating a fast-moving gait.

== See also ==
- Timeline of pachycephalosaur research

== Sources ==
- Fantastic Facts About Dinosaurs (ISBN 0-7525-3166-2)
