= Altangerel Perle =

Mongolian palaeontologist

- Born: 1945 (age 79–80); Mongolia
- Occupation: Palaeontologist

Altangerel Perle (born 1945) is a Mongolian palaeontologist. He is employed at the National University of Mongolia. He has described species such as Goyocephale lattimorei, Achillobator giganticus and Erlikosaurus andrewsi. He has been honored by Polish palaeontologist Halszka Osmólska, who named the species Hulsanpes perlei after him.
