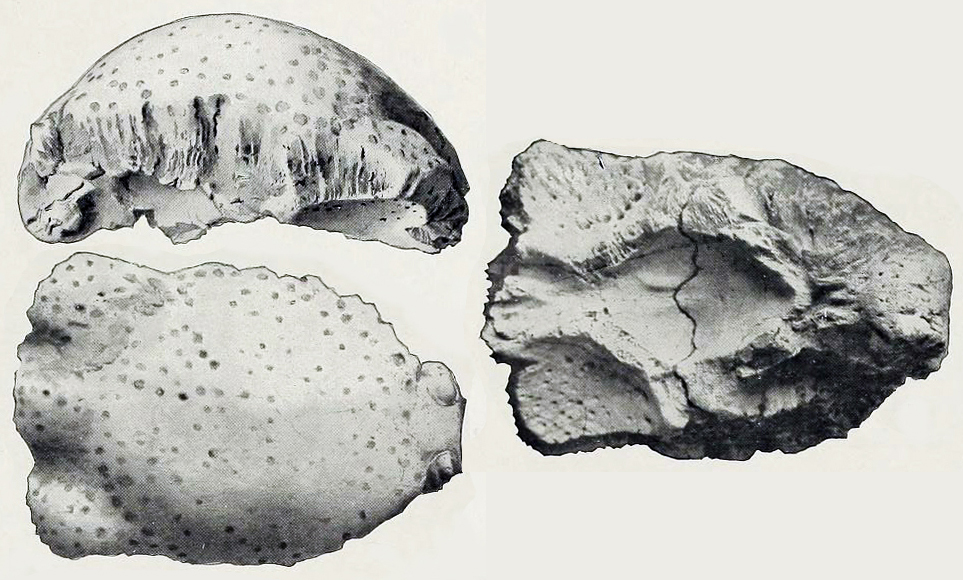
- Holotype specimen CMN 1423

Scientific classification
- Kingdom: Animalia
- Phylum: Chordata
- Class: Reptilia
- Clade: Dinosauria
- Clade: †Ornithischia
- Clade: †Pachycephalosauria
- Family: †Pachycephalosauridae
- Genus: †Foraminacephale; Schott & Evans, 2016
- Species: †F. brevis

Binomial name
- †Foraminacephale brevis (Lambe, 1918)

Synonyms
- Prenocephale brevis Sullivan, 2000; Sphaerotholus? brevis Longrich, Sankey & Tanke, 2010; Stegoceras brevis Lambe, 1918

= Foraminacephale =

Foraminacephale Temporal range: Late Cretaceous, 77–73 Ma

Extinct genus of dinosaurs

Foraminacephale (meaning "foramina head") is a genus of pachycephalosaurid dinosaur from Late Cretaceous (Campanian stage) deposits of Canada.

== Description ==
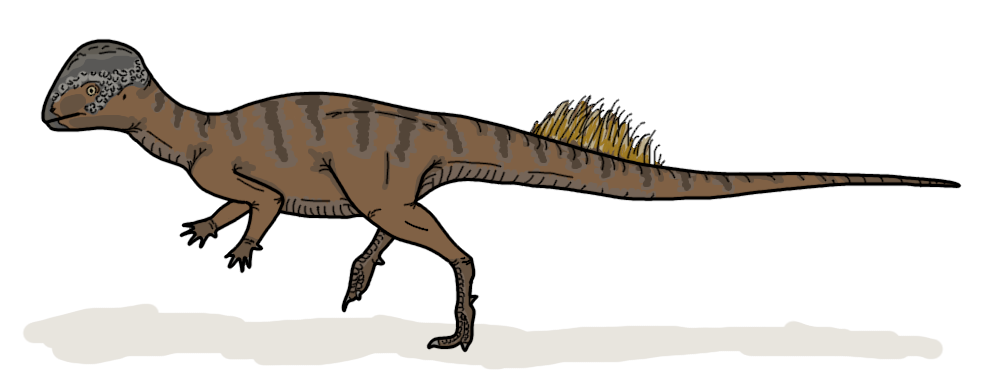
Life restoration of an adult

Foraminacephale, as a pachycephalosaurid, was a small, bipedal herbivore with a thickened dome on its skull. In 2016, Gregory S. Paul estimated its length at 1.5 metres (4.9 ft), its weight at 10 kilograms (22 lb). In Foraminacephale, the top surface of the dome is punctuated by many small pits, the eponymous foramina; the dome itself consists of a large, central lobe with a sloped frontal half, and two smaller lateral lobes at the front. The squamosal bone forms a tall bar of completely smooth bone underneath the dome, save for six bony nodes that line the bottom edge of the dome and an additional "corner" node just below. These features differentiate Foraminacephale from all other pachycephalosaurids.

Unlike Stegoceras, Hanssuesia, and Colepiocephale, the parietal bone of Foraminacephale (which constitutes the back part of the dome) projects backwards and downwards over the base of the skull. Two traits also differentiate Foraminacephale from Sphaerotholus and Prenocephale: there are prominent grooves between the central lobe and the lateral lobes, and the opening of the temporal bone is slit-like. Micro-CT scans of a potential specimen, identified as cf. Foraminacephale brevis, support that pachycephalosaurids likely engaged in head-butting.

=== Ontogeny ===
As with Stegoceras, the wide age range present in specimens of Foraminacephale allows for analysis of the ontogeny, or growth, of the dome. Measurements of 27 different points on 21 Foraminacephale skulls showed that the dome became proportionally taller with age, but did not become significantly wider. Histology of the specimens showed that the domes became less porous with age - the smallest specimen's skull was 1.67% empty space, while the largest specimen's skull was 0.25% empty space. Generally, the frontal part of the dome was more porous than the parietal part.

The growth series of the dome allows Foraminacephale to be differentiated further from Stegoceras. In young Stegoceras, the dome is flat; however, in even the smallest Foraminacephale specimens, the parietal is already slightly domed. The supratemporal fenestrae on the top of the skulls of Foraminacephale are slit-like, as opposed to Stegoceras where they are round, and they seal shut very early in ontogeny as opposed to remaining open more-or-less throughout the animal's lifespan. The amount of empty space in the skull roof was also smaller relative to Stegoceras, and more similar to Acrotholus. Furthermore, in Foraminacephale, the squamosal and postorbital bones became part of the dome much quicker, the dome thickened at a slower rate, and the sides of the dome were less angled than in Stegoceras.

== Discovery and naming ==
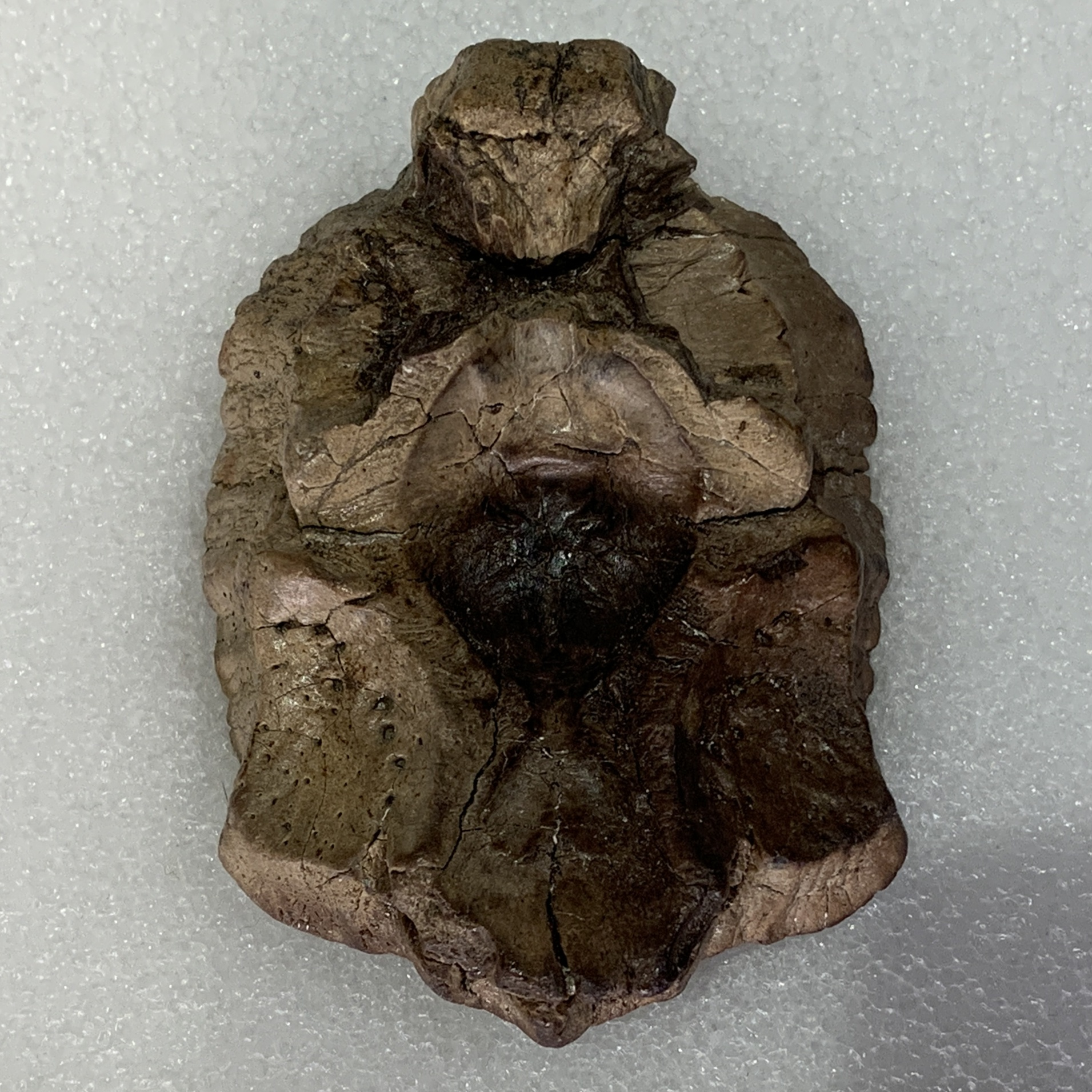
Dome at Royal Tyrrell Museum

The holotype of Foraminacephale is CMN 1423, a nearly complete frontoparietal dome collected in Dinosaur Provincial Park, Alberta in 1902 and reported on during the same year. The layers of rock where the specimen were found belong to the Dinosaur Park Formation of the Belly River Group. Various other fragments of the skull are also known from the Dinosaur Park Formation, representing juvenile, subadult, and adult individuals.

Although it has been reported that many specimens are known from the contemporary Oldman Formation, only one (catalogued as TMP 2015.044.0041) can definitely be assigned to Foraminacephale. Another specimen from the Horseshoe Canyon Formation formerly assigned to Foraminacephale, CMN 11316, was re-identified as a small, juvenile indeterminate pachycephalosaurine.

CMN 1423 was first assigned to a new species of Stegoceras by Lawrence Lambe in 1918; there was considerable debate over whether "S." brevis represented a truly distinct animal or simply a morph, perhaps the female, of S. validum. Later, it was assigned to Prenocephale by Robert M. Sullivan in 2000, and then it was assigned to Sphaerotholus by Longrich, Sankey & Tanke in 2010. In 2011, Ryan Schott suggested a new generic name, Foraminacephale, in his Master of Science thesis, resulting in a new combination Foraminacephale brevis. It remained an invalid nomen ex dissertatione until Schott and David Evans formally renamed "S." brevis to Foraminacephale brevis in 2016. The generic name combines Latin foramina ("foramina") with cephale, Latinised Greek for "head", referring to the many pits that covered the top of its dome.

== Classification ==
A phylogenetic analysis in 2016 found that Foraminacephale was a member of the Pachycephalosaurinae, in a more derived position than Stegoceras, but in a more basal position than Prenocephale. The consensus of the phylogenetic trees recovered is shown below.

- Pachycephalosauria
  - Wannanosaurus yanshiensis
  - Pachycephalosauridae
    - - Hanssuesia sternbergi
      - Colepiocephale lambei
      - Stegoceras validum
      - Stegoceras novomexicanum
    - Pachycephalosaurinae
      - Goyocephale lattimorei
      - - Homalocephale calathocercos
        - - Tylocephale gilmorei
          - - Foraminacephale brevis
            - - Amtocephale gobienses
              - - Prenocephale prenes
                - Acrotholus audeti
                - - - Pachycephalosaurus wyomingensis
                    - Alaskacephale gonglofi
                    - - Dracorex hogwartsia
                      - Stygimoloch spinifer
                  - - Sphaerotholus goodwini
                    - Sphaerotholus buchholtzae

The topology of this phylogenetic tree is not very stable, likely due to the incompleteness of most pachycephalosaur specimens.

== Paleoecology ==
The Belly River Group is particularly rich in pachycephalosaur remains; 70% of all known pachycephalosaur fossils come from this region. Because of a lack of understanding of pachycephalosaur ontogeny, various authors have assigned this material to anywhere from a single species, Stegoceras validum, to four different genera. This has significant implications for the Late Cretaceous biodiversity of herbivorous dinosaurs. The 2016 description of Foraminacephale recognized four distinct species of pachycephalosaur from the Belly River Group: Stegoceras, Foraminacephale, Hanssuesia, and Colepiocephale, although the specimens that have been referred to Hanssuesia likely represent more than one of the existing species.

== See also ==
- 2016 in paleontology
