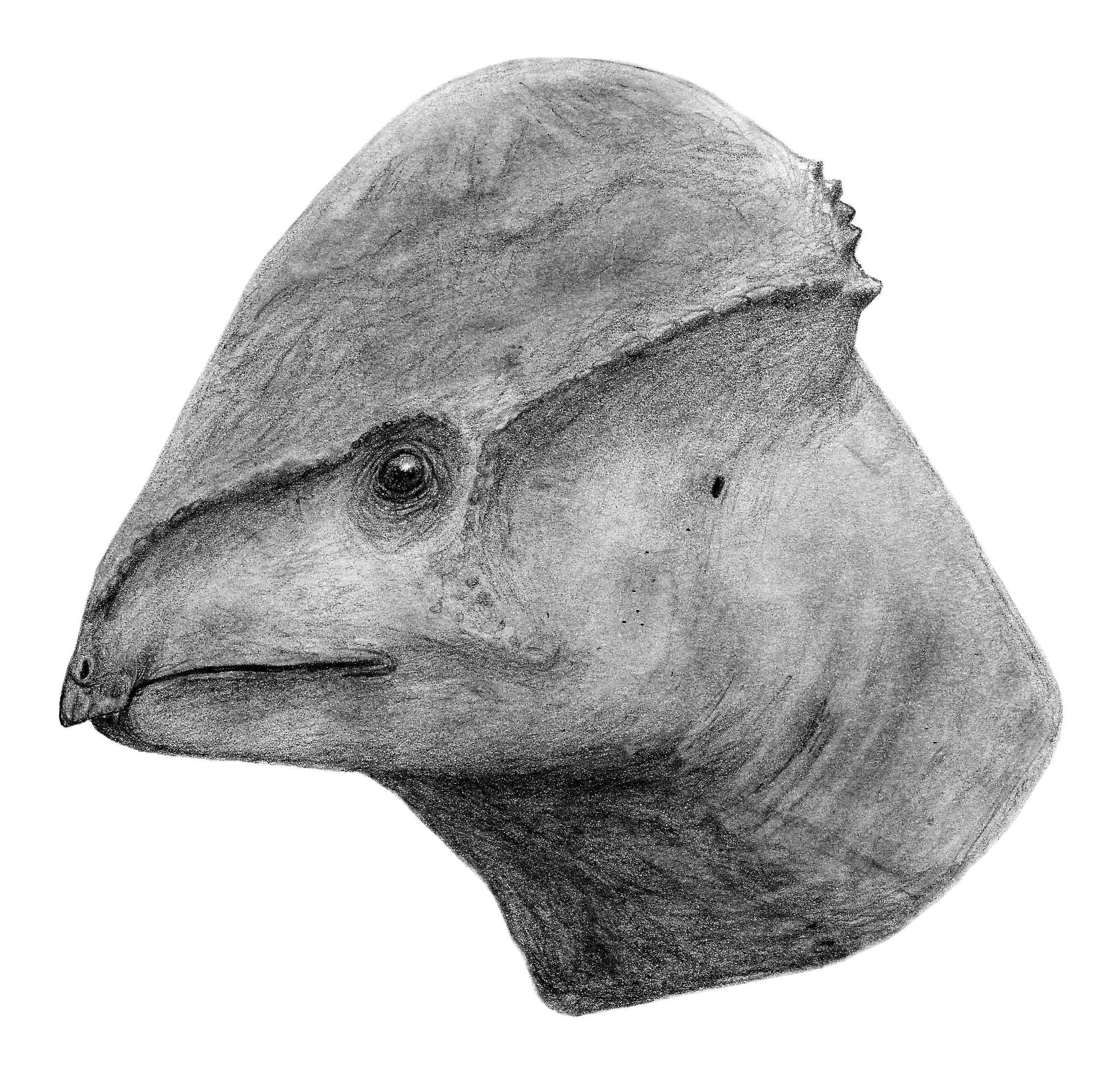
- Speculative restoration

Scientific classification
- Kingdom: Animalia
- Phylum: Chordata
- Class: Reptilia
- Clade: Dinosauria
- Clade: †Ornithischia
- Clade: †Pachycephalosauria
- Family: †Pachycephalosauridae
- Subfamily: †Pachycephalosaurinae
- Genus: †Amtocephale; Watabe, Tsogtbaatar & Sullivan, 2011

Species
- †A. gobiensis Watabe, Tsogtbaatar & Sullivan, 2011 (type)

= Amtocephale =

Amtocephale Temporal range: Late Cretaceous, ~96–89.6 Ma

Extinct genus of dinosaurs

Amtocephale is a genus of pachycephalosaurid dinosaur from early Late Cretaceous (Cenomanian-Coniacian stages) deposits of southern Gobi Desert, Mongolia.

Amtocephale is known from the holotype MPC-D 100/1203, a nearly complete frontoparietal dome of a subadult individual. It was collected from the Baynshire Formation at the Amtgai locality. Amtocephale was first named by Mahito Watabe, Khishigjaw Tsogtbaatar and Robert M. Sullivan in 2011 and the type species is Amtocephale gobiensis. The generic name combines a reference to the Amtgai site with a Greek κεφαλή, kephale, "head". The specific name refers to the provenance from the Gobi.

Amtocephale was assigned to the Pachycephalosauridae and is perhaps the oldest pachycephalosaurid known, depending on the exact age of the formation.

== History of naming ==
Paleontological expeditions of the Hayashibara Museum of Natural Sciences with the Mongolian Paleontological Center into the Gobi Desert began in 1993, surveying and prospecting in over 50 localities. The Amtgai locality, an outcrop of fossil beds within small cliffs, was excavated in 1993, 1994, 2001 and 2004. This small bed of less than 20 m (66 ft) of exposed sandstone and mudstone is part of the Baynshire Formation, where the HMNS and MPC collected vertebrae and limb bones of ornithopods, turtle skulls and shells, several specimens of the theropod Segnosaurus, and the skull of a pachycephalosaur. This single partial subadult skull of Amtocephale from the Baynshire Formation, MPC-D 100/1203, was described by Japanese paleontologist Mahito Watabe, Mongolian paleontogist Khishigjaw Tsogtbaatar, and American paleontologist Robert M. Sullivan in 2011 as the new taxon Amtocephale gobiensis. The genus name is a combination of the Amtgai locality and the Ancient Greek word κεφαλή (cephalo) for "head", while the species name is a reference to the Gobi Desert of Mongolia where it was found.

The age of the Baynshire Formation is poorly constrained, correlated to some stage of the early Late Cretaceous between the Cenomanian and the Santonian, though it has even been found to be as young as the Campanian (~80.6 mya). Review of the land-vertebrate faunas of Mongolia has been inconclusive as the fauna are not distinctive, but as it is from the Baynshire Formation Amtocephale would correlate with a "Baynshirenian" age. The vertebrates of the Baynshire Formation suggest the Amtgai locality is no younger than the Santonian (83.5 mya) but it may be slightly older. This makes Amtocephale approximately the same age as the fauna of the Milk River Formation of Alberta. Recent calcite U–Pb measurements performed by Kurumada and colleagues in 2020 have estimated the age of the Baynshire Formation between 95.9 ± 6.0 Ma and 89.6 ± 4.0 Ma, corresponding to the Cenomanian-Coniacian stages, which supports Amtocephale as the oldest known pachycephalosaurid.

== Description ==
The frontoparietal dome, formed by a fusion of the frontals in front and the parietals in the back, has a length of 53.2 millimetres (2.09 in) and a maximal thickness of 19 millimetres (0.75 in). The contribution to the dome length of the parietal part is exceptionally large, with a portion of 41%.
